= Ernest Jones (golfer) =

English professional golfer (1887–1965)

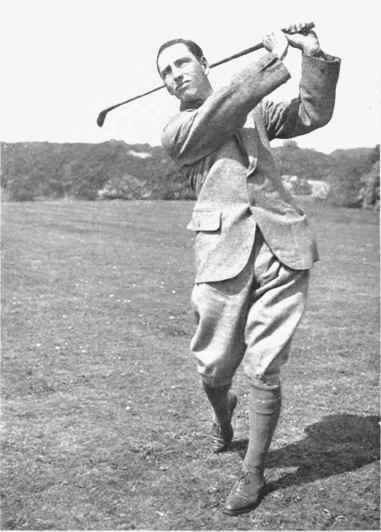
Ernest Jones, c. 1912

Jones after the war, c. 1916

Ernest Jones (October 25, 1887– July 1965) was an English professional golfer. He is renowned for his accomplishments in teaching many famous professional golfers as well as amateurs. He tutored Virginia Van Wie for many years, including during her stretch of three consecutive U.S. Women's Amateurs from 1932 to 1934. He also worked with Glenna Collett Vare, Lawson Little, Betty Hicks, Phil Farley, George Schniter, Horton Smith and other top players of the era.

== Early life ==
Jones was born near Manchester, England. He began playing golf as a young boy and won the caddie championship at age 12. By the age of 18 secured employment at Chislehurst Golf Club as an assistant professional. In 1913 at the age of 25 he was made head professional at that club. In 1914 he joined the army. As a soldier in the First World War, he was in France. There in March 1916 he was serving in the Sportsman's Battalion of the Royal Fusiliers, near Loos. As the result of an exploding grenade, he suffered the loss of his right leg just below the knee. While a severe injury on its own merit, Jones was afraid it would be a handicap and perhaps be the end to his career as a professional golfer. He was sent back to England where he recuperated for four months. Able to walk using crutches, he proceeded to attempt his first round of golf at Royal Norwich in 1916 where he carded an 83 (38/45) on that first outing. He followed shortly thereafter with a 72 on a long and challenging course. While a relief regarding his prospects for continuing the golf profession, these rounds would prove to bring a surprising and revolutionary change to his concept of golf and its instruction. Later, he was fitted with a prosthetic.

In 1923, at the invitation of Marion Hollins, Jones accepted the position of Head Golf Professional at the Women's National Golf and Tennis Club in Long Island, New York. Along with his wife Rosina and daughter Patricia, they located in Oyster Bay, New York. The residence was a short eight miles to the golf course. This was the beginning of a lifelong career of teaching in the U.S.

Subsequent to this position, Jones began teaching in New York City. He had an indoor teaching facility on the 7th floor of the A.G. Spaulding and Bros. store at 518 Fifth Avenue in Manhattan. During this time he would book almost 3,000 lessons per year at the exorbitant price of $5 teaching from 9:30 in the morning until he need to leave to catch the 6:08 train for Glen Head, Long Island.

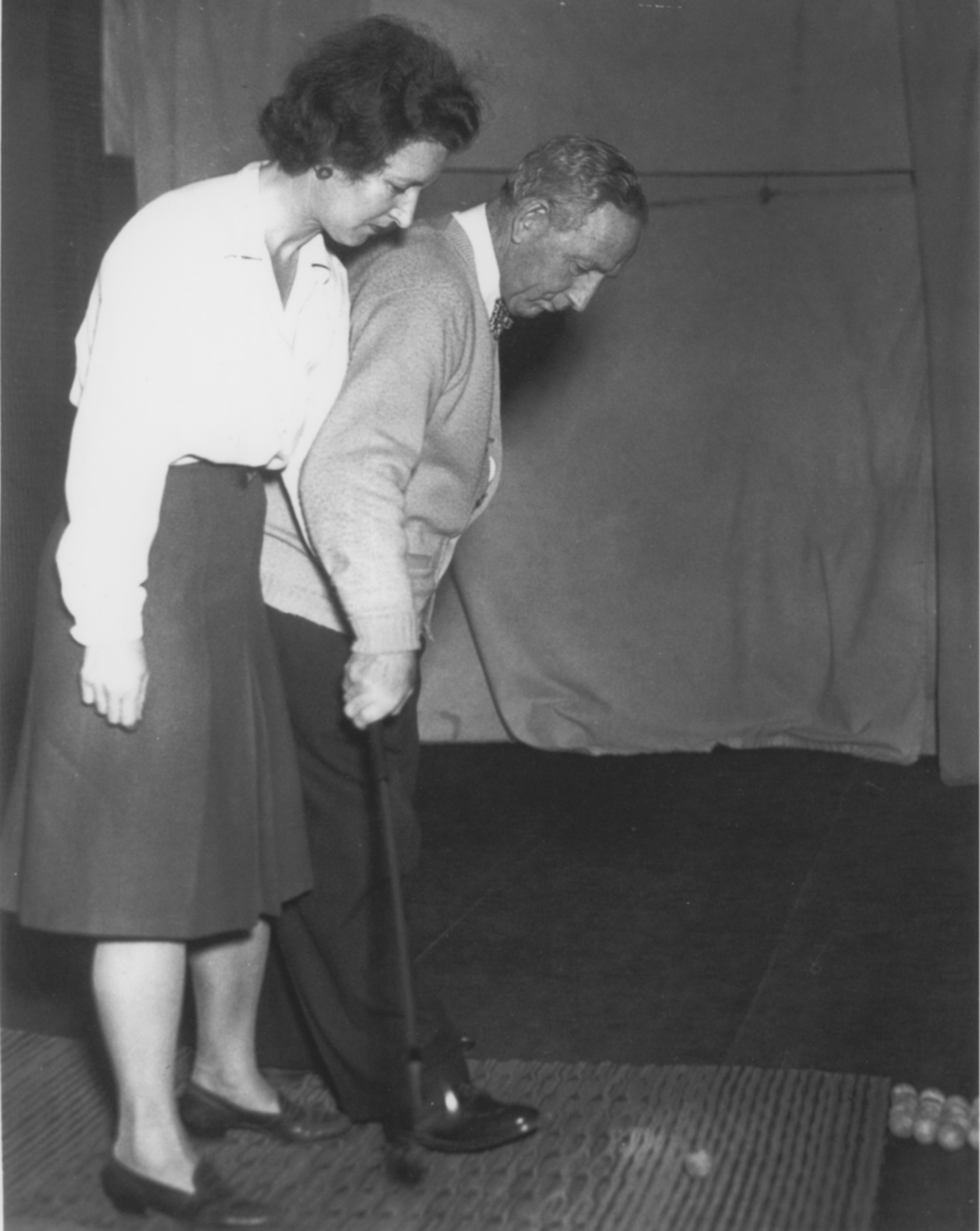
Jones with student at his indoor facility in the Spaulding Building in New York City

Other notable instructors of the era would not have half that number of lessons and would charge many times that amount. Jones found that he could achieve better success with his students indoors because they would not be distracted by ball flight and instead focused on performing the swing correctly by focusing on swinging the club with the intention of creating centrifugal force in the club that could in turn propel the ball. Perhaps his favorite training aid and that for which he became known was a swinging a penknife suspended from two handkerchiefs knotted end to end.

== Instructional development ==
Jones began to ask himself how it could be that he could yet score so effectively, with such a radical change needing to be made to how his body swung the club having only one leg. Jones himself as well as countless others proved to be able to play well with missing body parts or body parts that were limited in their function. Despite the prevalence of golf instruction that described these missing or malfunctioning parts as being essential, Jones and others demonstrated that a golfer's brain would devise compensating strategies to yet produce fine golf shots. This success, in conjunction with his reading of Sir Walter Simpson's book, "The Art of Golf", brought him to the fundamental fact that the key to a successful golf shot was not the correct movement of certain body parts, but the correct movement of the club. Instead of the movement of body parts, the real key was the successful movement of the golf club. Jones had happened upon the then-little-understood fact that the human brain need only experience a person's desire to perform a task. On its own the brain devises a means to create the muscular action to achieve the task. The individual is only aware of "what" they want to do. The brain's action in deciding "how" it will accomplish the task is completely unconscious. This explains how very proficient golfers often report that they have little understanding of "how" they swing and only understand that they can do so when they choose.

Thus it was the case that Jones began his quest to discover, document, and disseminate a description of "how" the club swung and how to most easily teach the club's movements to others. The result was the writing of many articles on this subject and the publishing of two books. Further, Jones took every opportunity to share his insights with fellow professionals. Jones' simple concept is summarized in the classic "Swing The Clubhead" instruction.

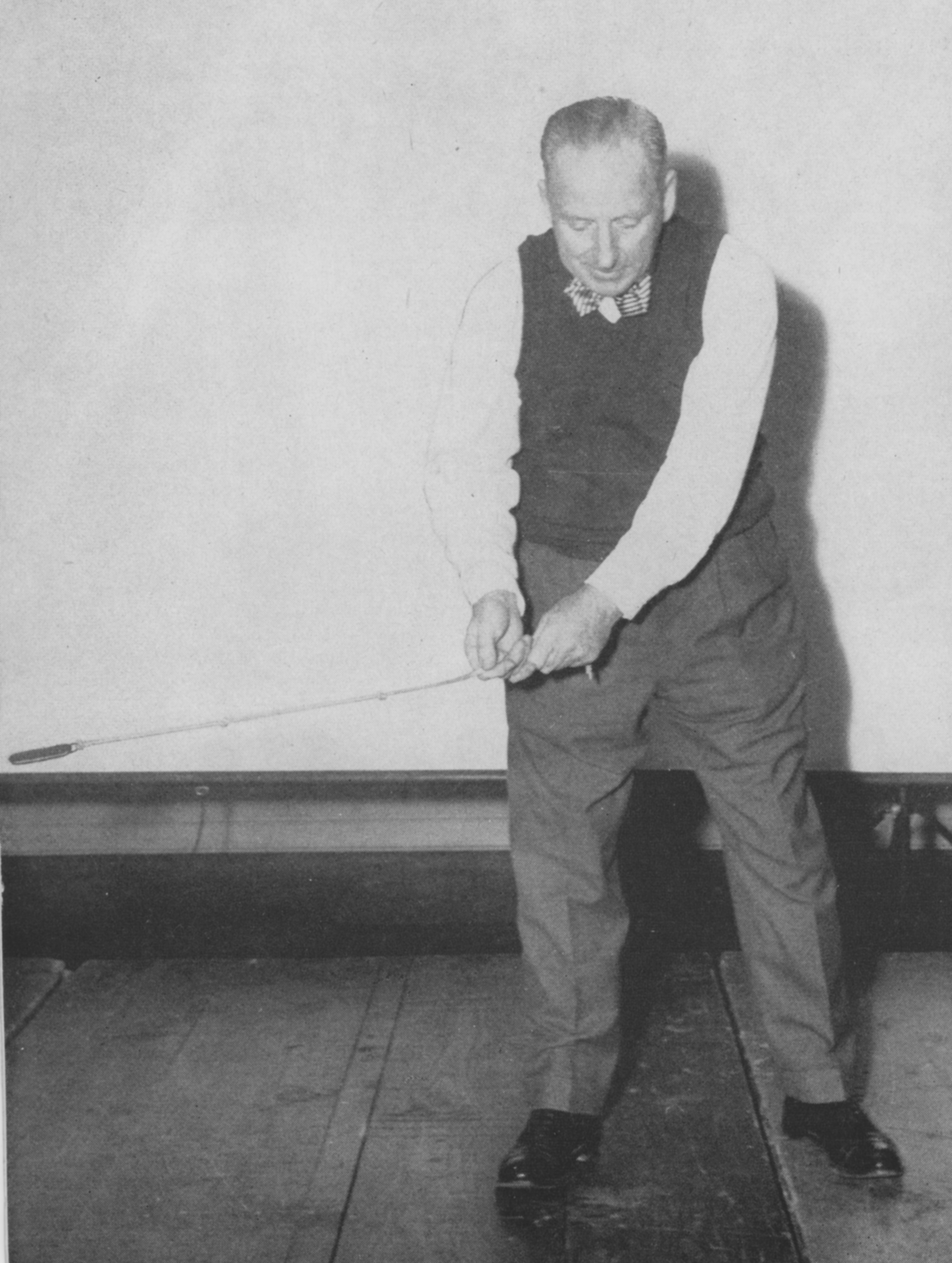
Ernest_Jones_@_PGA_mtg

The drastic simplicity of his approach to golf instruction met with rancor and objection when he was invited by the PGA (Professional Golfers' Association of America) to present his work. Horton Smith, then the incoming president of the association, told Jones his system was "..too simple. We wouldn't sell enough lessons." Jones responded, "That's the trouble, you want your students to keep on suffering. Once you get your people to swing the clubhead they will improve." Perhaps much to the PGA's chagrin, whereas an average pro would have given about 600 lessons a year, Jones would give many times that number. One of Jones' devotees was Angel de la Torre who in turn taught this approach to his son Manuel de la Torre. These two professionals alone would add thousands to the list golfers who benefited from a "club-focused" approach to golf. Jones often said, "The trouble with the teaching of golf, is that one is taught what a swing produces [body movement], instead of how to produce a swing [club movement]." Manuel de la Torre was the preeminent authority on the Ernest Jones approach and further developed it in his teaching.

== Death and legacy ==
Jones died in 1965. His career included playing competitively on the European tour, winning a number of tournaments, head golf professional at several of America's most esteemed golf clubs, and a career of teaching both tour professional and amateur golfers. In 1965 he was the recipient of the Ben Hogan award. Along with Harvey Penick, Tommy Armour, and Percy Boomer, he was inducted into the World Golf Teachers Hall of Fame in 1977 .

== Famous Jones-isms ==
"The trouble with the teaching of golf is that one is taught what a Swing produces, instead of how to produce a Swing."
“Suppose you draw a circle freehand. You actually make but a single line that forms the circumference. You might cut that circle in two, ten or a hundred parts, but you would hardly think of drawing a circle by first drawing a number of arcs and then piecing them together.”
"Just because golf is elusive is no reason to complicate it.”
"A swinging action is the only reliable and dependable source of control in a golf stroke.”
"You may vary the Swing length, but you may not vary from the Swinging motion."
"There is no such thing as a position of Swing.”
"Swing the clubhead with your hands and allow your shoulders to look on impassively. Let your body be a follower, not a leader."
"Only when we insist on considering that balance comes about by a transfer of weight, by a conscious effort—or worse yet, series of efforts—does it become a perplexing and annoying problem.”
"Don't be afraid of over-swinging; there is no such thing as over-swinging."
"I think it was Napoleon who said, ’Look after the principle and the detail will take care of itself.’"

== Books ==
- Jones, Ernest (September 2003). Swing the Clubhead. [Skylane Publishing. ISBN 0-9760174-0-7. originally published as Swinging into Golf 1937
- Hammond, Daryn (September 1920). The Golf Swing, The Ernest Jones Method. Chatto & Windus.
- Jones, Ernest (1952). Swing the Clubhead. Dodd, Mead.
