= Helen Hicks =

American professional golfer

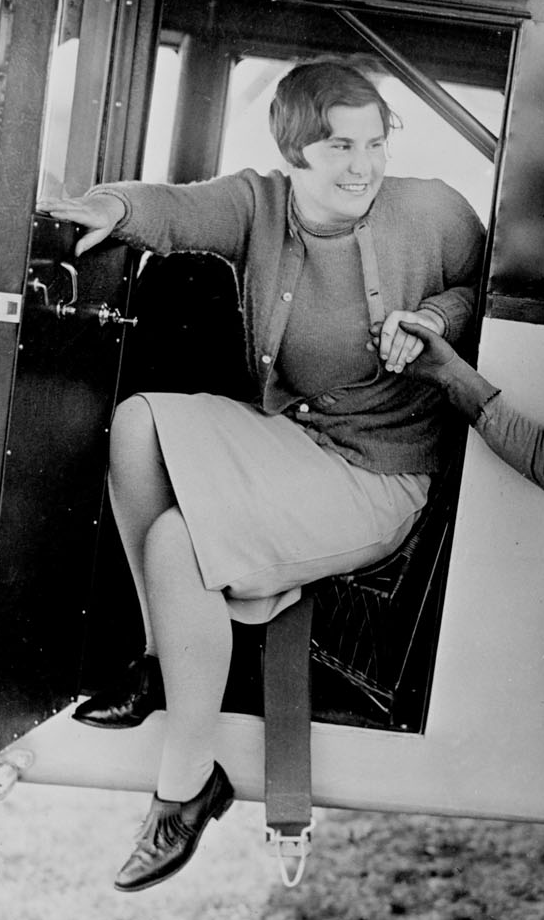
- Hicks in 1928

Personal information
- Full name: Helen L. Hicks Harb
- Nationality: United States
- Born: February 11, 1911 Cedarhurst, New York, U.S.
- Died: December 16, 1974 (aged 63)
- Spouse: Whitney Harb (m. 1938–1948)

Career
- Sport: Golf
- Turned professional: 1934
- Former tour: LPGA Tour (Founder)
- Professional wins: 2

Number of wins by tour
- LPGA Tour: 2

Best results in LPGA major championships (wins: 2)
- Western Open: Won: 1937
- Titleholders C'ship: Won: 1940

Achievements and awards
- World Golf Hall of Fame: 2024 (member page)

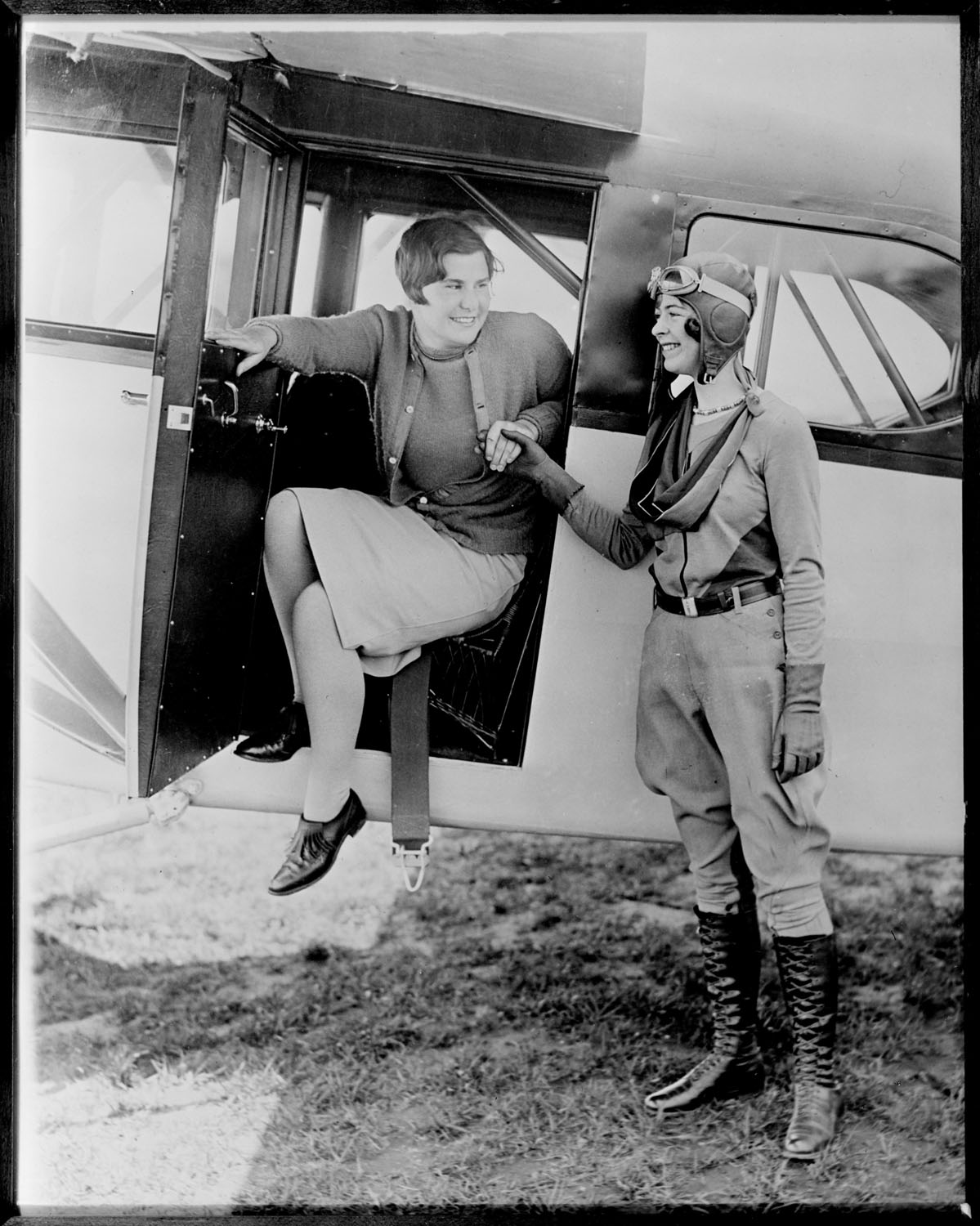
Hicks and Elinor Smith c.1928 in Farmingdale, New York

Helen L. Hicks Harb (February 11, 1911 – December 16, 1974) was an American professional golfer and one of 13 founders of the LPGA in 1950.

== Biography ==
Hicks was born in Cedarhurst, New York. She began playing golf at the age of 15, after being taught by her father. She attended Lawrence High School, where she played basketball for her school's team while simultaneously competing and winning such tournaments as the Junior Girls' Championship of the Metropolitan Women's Golf Association. She had a successful amateur career, reaching the finals of the U.S. Women's Amateur twice. She beat Glenna Collett Vare in 1931 and lost to Virginia Van Wie in 1933. She won several other amateur tournaments and played on the first U.S. Curtis Cup team in 1932.

In 1934, Hicks became one of the first women to turned professional; signing with the Wilson Sporting Goods Company to promote their golf equipment.

Hicks won two tournaments as a professional that are now considered LPGA major championships: the 1937 Women's Western Open and the 1940 Titleholders Championship. From 1938 to 1948, she competed as Helen Hicks Harb after marrying Whitney Harb.

In 1950, Hicks was one of 13 women that founded the LPGA.

Hicks died of throat cancer in 1974.

Hicks is sometimes confused with contemporary Betty Hicks who won the 1941 U.S. Women's Amateur.

== Tournament wins ==
this list is incomplete

- 1929 Canadian Women's Amateur, Berthellyn Cup
- 1930 New York State Women's Amateur
- 1931 U.S. Women's Amateur, Metropolitan Women's Amateur, Women's Eastern Championship, New York State Women's Amateur
- 1933 Metropolitan Women's Amateur, New York State Women's Amateur
- 1937 Women's Western Open
- 1940 Titleholders Championship

== Major championships ==
=== Wins (2) ===
Year	Championship	Winning score	Margin	Runner-up
1937	Women's Western Open	6 & 5		(United States) Bea Barrett (a)
1940	Titleholders Championship	+36 (87-83-85-81=336)	1 stroke	(United States) Helen Dettweiler

== Team appearances ==
Amateur

- Curtis Cup (representing the United States): 1932 (winners)
