= Caverly =

Caverly is an English toponymic surname associated with the village of Calverley in West Yorkshire, England. Notable people with the surname include:

- Kristen Caverly (born 1984), American swimmer
- Mildred Caverly (1893–1985), American golfer
- Robert Henry Caverly, American engineer
