= Maude A. K. Wetmore =

American political organizer and historical preservationist (1873–1951)

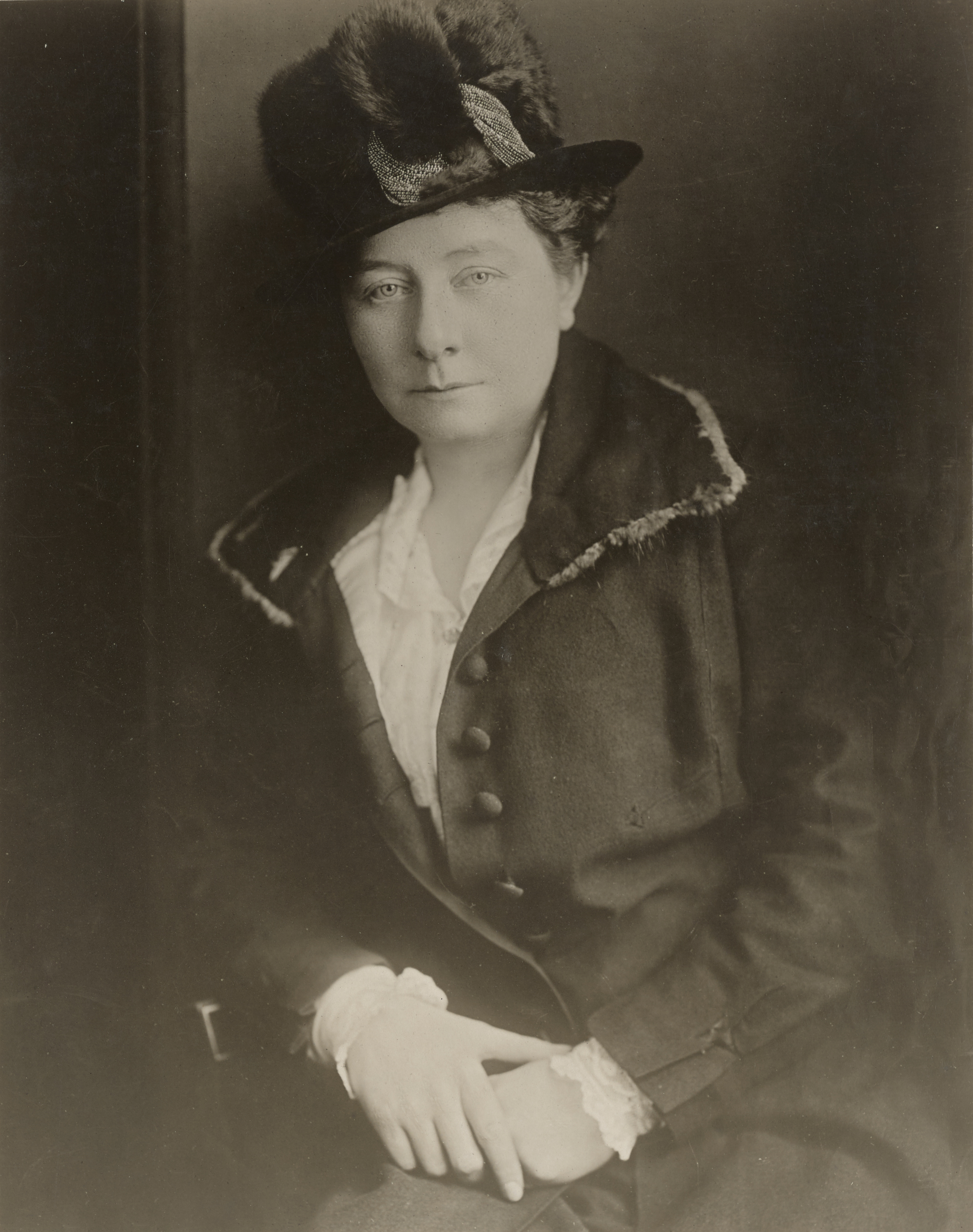
- Wetmore during World War I
- Born: Maude Alice Keteltas Wetmore; February 7, 1873; Paris, France
- Died: November 3, 1951 (aged 78); Newport, Rhode Island, U.S.
- Other names: Maude K. Wetmore
- Occupations: Political organizer, historic preservationist, golfer

Maude Alice Keteltas Wetmore (February 7, 1873 – November 3, 1951) was an American political organizer and historical preservationist, based in Newport, Rhode Island. She and her sister lived in the Wetmore family mansion, Chateau-sur-Mer, now a museum in Newport.

== Early life ==
Wetmore was born to American parents in Paris, George Peabody Wetmore and Edith Malvina Keteltas Wetmore. Her father was a politician; he served as Governor of Rhode Island and as a United States Senator representing the state.

== Career ==
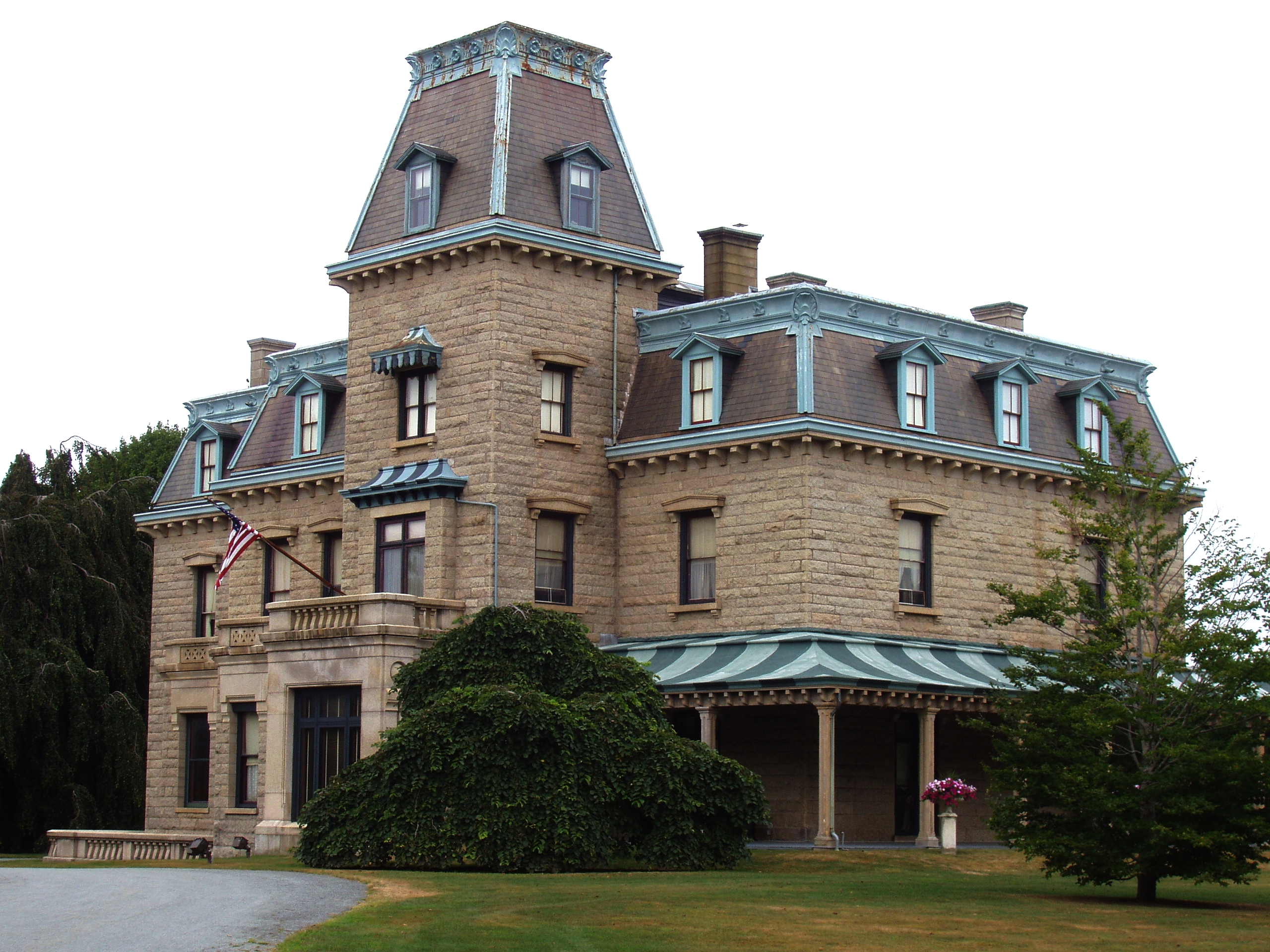
Chateau-sur-Mer, Newport, Rhode Island

=== Politics ===
Following her father into Republican Party activities, Wetmore was a member of the Republican National Committee, president of the Women's National Republican Club and president of the Newport County Women's Republican Club. She laid the cornerstone of the Women's National Republican Club's New York headquarters in 1933. She was a delegate to several Republican National Conventions. She chaired the Women's Organization for Prohibition Reform, the National League for Women's Service, and the Women's Department of the National Civic Federation. She hosted Republican fundraisers at her Newport mansion.

Wetmore was an enthusiastic automobile driver and drove herself to the Republican National Convention in Cleveland in 1936. She chaired the Republican Women's National Motor Corps, a group that organized rides to events and provided special vehicles for parades.

=== War work ===
During World War I, Wetmore served on the Committee on Women's Defense Work, and was a member of the National Patriotic Relief Committee, and worked with Herbert Hoover, then the National Food Administrator. She was also a member of the American section of Committee for Relief of Belgian Prisoners in Germany. Though she never supported the suffrage movement, she hoped that war work with empower women to peacetime reforms: "If some of the war enthusiasm can be rekindled and women made to understand and see and then in mass demand for their children what the Government, in honor bound, is obligated to give them, there would be no difficult in solving the school problem," she proclaimed in a 1920 speech. "The coming generation would be finer and women, consequently, finer citizens."

During World War II, she was vice president of the American Friends of France.

=== Historic preservation and society in Newport ===
Wetmore and her older sister Edith K. Wetmore were active in historical preservation in Newport, Rhode Island. They took particular interest in the Seamen's Church Institute and the Old State House. The Wetmore sisters donated many of the valuable objects they inherited to museums, including French earthenware to the Cooper Hewitt Museum, a "ladies' phaeton" to the carriage gallery of the New-York Historical Society, and a collection of silver toys and family portraits to the Yale University Art Gallery.

The Wetmores hosted cultural events at Chateau-sur-Mer, including a garden party honoring Navy admiral Joseph Mason Reeves in 1934, and a chamber music concert in 1938, with Leonard Bernstein, then a Harvard undergraduate, performing as piano soloist.

=== Schools and camps ===
Maude Wetmore was involved in the Reform School for Girls of the District of Columbia, serving on the board of trustees in 1907, and donating a piano, sheet music, and books in 1909. In 1915, she and philanthropist Anne Morgan welcomed 300 young women to their Camp Inkowa at Greenwood Lake, with an opening program given by Charles Eastman.

=== Sports ===
Wetmore was an active lawn tennis player and golfer, as a member of the Newport Country Club. She reached the finals of the U.S. Women's Amateur in 1898, where she lost to Beatrix Hoyt.

== Personal life ==
Maude A. K. Wetmore died in 1951, aged 78, from a heart attack, at her home in Newport, Chateau-sur-Mer. Her sister died in 1966. In her will, Maude bequeathed the Wetmore mansion to her sister's use and then to the New England Society for the Preservation of Antiquities. The Preservation Society of Newport County now operates Chateau-sur-Mer as a museum.
