= Elaine Rosenthal =

American golfer (1896–1993)

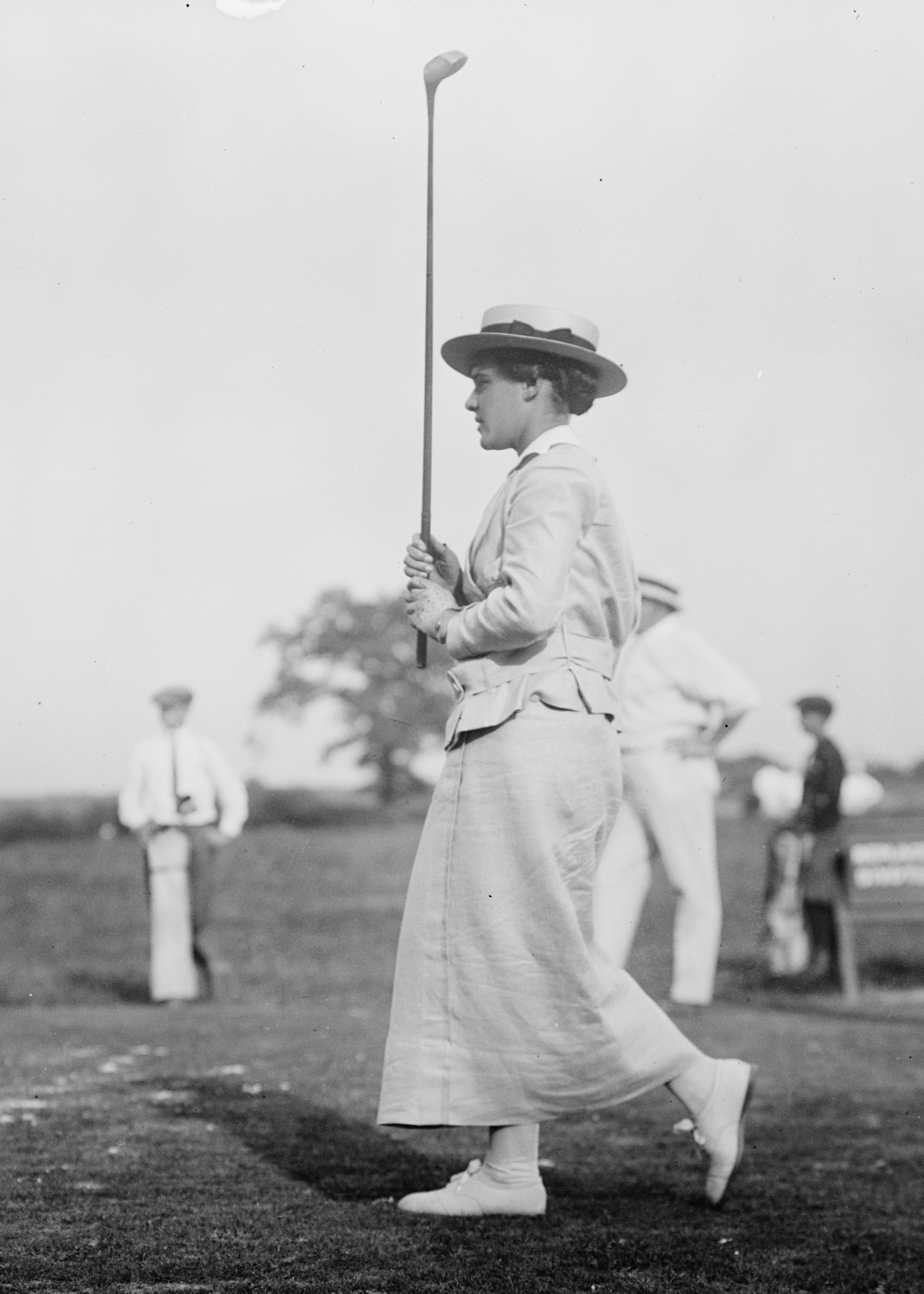
Elaine V. Rosenthal in 1915

Elaine Virginia Rosenthal Reinhart (July 3, 1896 — May 12, 1993) won the Women's Western Amateur golf championship in 1915, 1918, and 1925. Her home course was the Ravisloe Country Club in Homewood, Illinois.

== Biography ==
She was born as Elaine Virginia Rosenthal on July 3, 1896, in Chicago, Illinois to Benjamin Jefferson Rosenthal and Hannah W. Stumer. She won the Women's Western Amateur championship in 1915 and 1918.

During World War I, she joined the Dixie Kids, elite young golfers who gave golf exhibitions to raise funds for the Red Cross. The other Dixie Kids were Bobby Jones, Perry Adair, and Alexa Stirling.

She married Sylvain Louis Reinhardt of Dallas, Texas on December 10, 1921, in Chicago, Illinois. Her husband was on the Yale Bulldogs football team at Yale University. Rosenthal won the Women's Western Amateur championship a third time in 1925 at the Glen View Country Club. She shot 256, beating her closest rival, Virginia Wilson, who scored a 264. She also defeated the previous champion, Lucia Mida, who scored a 274.

Rosenthal also won the North and South Women's Amateur in 1917 and finished runner-up to Katherine Harley in the 1914 U.S. Women's Amateur.

She married George S. Moseley on March 15, 1939.

She died in Geneva, Illinois on May 12, 1993.

== Legacy ==
She was inducted into the Illinois Golf Hall of Fame in 1995.

Rosenthal, with other Jewish golfers of Chicago, was a leading advocate to change the antisemitic policy of Chicago's Women's Western Golf Association (WWGA). In 1923, their efforts succeeded, and the policy changed. Chicago sportswriter Robert Pruter wrote: "Elaine V. Rosenthal was Chicago's first superstar golf champion, whose achievements largely occurred before the 1920s. Until Amy Alcott came along in the 1970s, Rosenthal was the most famous Jewish golfer in the sport, who triumphed over anti-Semitic exclusion and discrimination that pervaded golf in her era."

== Tournament wins ==
- 1915 Women's Western Amateur
- 1917 North and South Women's Amateur
- 1918 Women's Western Amateur
- 1925 Women's Western Amateur
