= Harriot Curtis =

American golfer and skier (1881–1904)

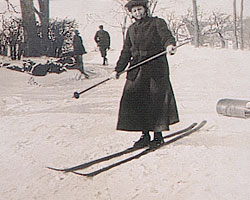
- Curtis skiing in 1904

Personal information
- Full name: Harriot Sumner Curtis
- Nationality: United States
- Born: June 30, 1881 Manchester-by-the-Sea, Massachusetts, U.S.
- Died: October 25, 1974 (aged 93) Manchester-by-the-Sea, Massachusetts, U.S.

Career
- Sport: Golf
- Status: Amateur

Harriot Sumner Curtis (June 30, 1881 – October 25, 1974) was an American amateur golfer. She was an early participant in the sport of skiing.

== Early life ==
In 1881, Curtis was born in the Manchester-by-the-Sea, Massachusetts area. She was one of ten children. Her father was a colonel in the Union Army cavalry during the American Civil War. Her brother, James Freeman Curtis, became a lawyer in New York City and was the Assistant United States Secretary of the Treasury under President William Howard Taft.

Her cousin, Laurence Curtis, who served as the second President of the United States Golf Association (USGA) in 1897-98, encouraged the family to take up the game of golf. As a result, Harriot and her younger sister, Margaret Curtis, began playing golf at an early age. As young ladies they played out of the Essex County Club in Manchester and were members of the Women's Golf Association of Massachusetts. Founded in 1900, it the first state women's golf association in the United States.

== Career ==
=== Golf ===
In 1904, Curtis was a co-winner of the Medal given to the golfer who shoots the lowest score in qualifying rounds at the United States Women's Amateur Golf Championship. At the 1906 U.S. Championship, held at the Brae Burn Country Club in Newton, Massachusetts, she defeated Mary B. Adams in the finals to win the title. In 1907, she met her sister Margaret in the final at the Midlothian Country Club, near Chicago. Her sister won the title and went on to win the Championship two more times. In 1908, Curtis set a record with the lowest score at the U.S. Championship but lost in the second round.

In 1905, the Curtis sisters and a number of other American women golfers made a visit to Britain to compete in the British Ladies Amateur Championship. They also played in an informal match between Britain and America a few days before the Championship. This visit led to four British women coming to the United States to compete in the U.S. Championship a few years later in 1909. One of the British women was that year's British Amateur champion Dorothy Campbell who won the U.S. title, becoming the first woman to hold both golf titles.

In 1932, Margaret Curtis and her sister donated the Curtis Cup for the biennial golfing competition between the United States and Great Britain. Active in golfing matters for most of her life, in December 1955 the Women's Golf Association of Massachusetts established a tournament in her and her sister's honor. The trophy, known as "The Curtis Bowl," is a replica of the Curtis Cup.

=== Philanthropy ===
Harriot and Margaret Curtis were heavily involved in charity and philanthropy throughout the entirety of their lives. They did a lot of work to improve people's lives in the areas of health and medicine. In the early 20th century, the pair founded a health clinic called Maverick Dispensary that gradually grew in patients each year. The sisters paid for the expenses for the clinic out of pocket. Their work was extremely important considering that many people were impoverished, especially the Italian American population they served, and lacked access to healthcare. The sisters have also been associated with other organizations in the Boston area.

In addition to golf and providing medical access, Harriot was also interested in education. She served as the dean of women in Hampton Institute in Virginia from 1927 to 1931.

== Personal life ==
In 1974, Curtis died in Manchester, Massachusetts at the age of 93.

== Amateur wins ==
- 1906 U.S. Women's Amateur
- 1920 Massachusetts Women's Amateur
