= Midlothian Country Club =

Private country club and golf course, host of the 1914 U.S. Open

Coordinates: 41°37′52″N 87°44′46″W

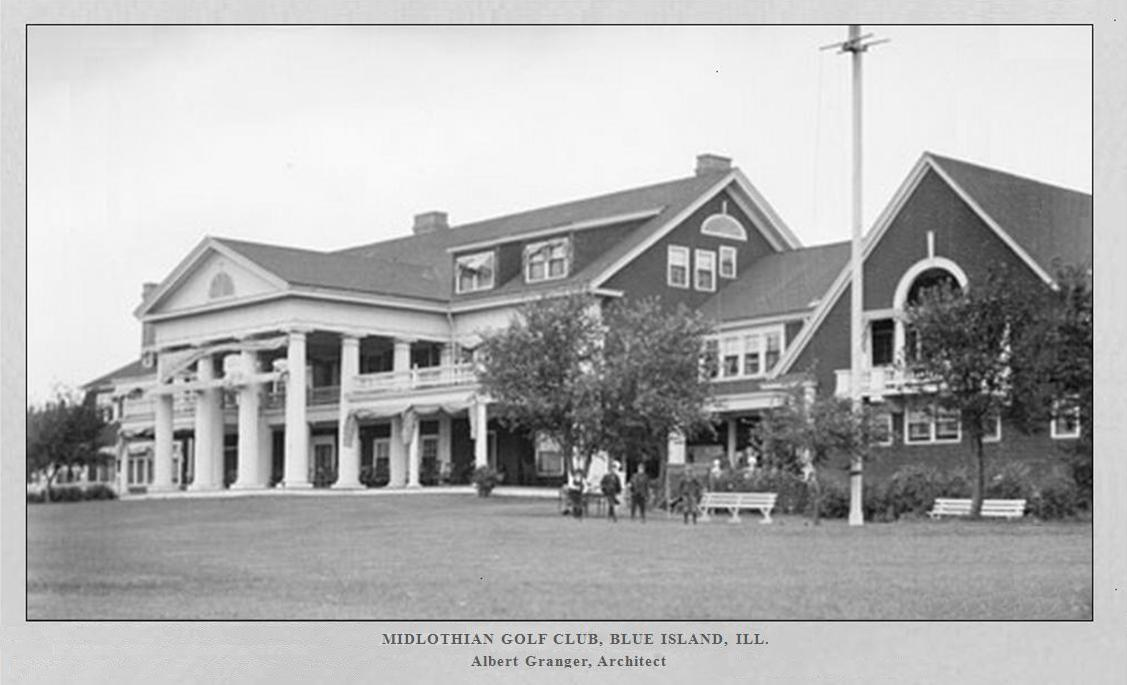
- The first clubhouse (1898, demolished) - Albert Granger, architect
- Interactive map of Midlothian Country Club

Club information
- Location: Midlothian, Illinois, USA
- Established: 1898
- Type: Private
- Total holes: 18
- Website: https://midlothiancc.org/
- Designed by: Herbert J. Tweedie
- Par: 71
- Length: 6928
- Course rating: 74.1 / 136
- Course record: (64) Tournament Course Record (1973 - Leonard Thompson)

Midlothian Country Club is a historic golf course in Midlothian, Illinois. It is located 18 miles (29 km) southwest of Chicago and built on 208 acres (84 ha) of land. It was designed by Herbert J. Tweedie and opened in 1898. In 2003 the course was updated by Ken Killian, Richard P. Nugent and architect Bob Lohmann of Lohmann Golf Designs. In 2021-2022 the course was renovated by architect, Raymond Hearn to enhance 82 bunkers, lengthen tee boxes and many other enhancements which returned Midlothian Country Club to its championship caliber.

== History ==
=== The Golf Phase In the United States ===
The first golf club to open in the Chicago area was actually open for business a year before the World's Fair. On July 18, 1893, a charter was granted to the Chicago Golf Club, now located in Wheaton, Illinois. The Chicago Golf Club would remain under the leadership of Charles B. Macdonald until the Chicago Golf Club moved from its Belmont location to its current Wheaton location.

Although golf courses have sprouted up in the United States on rare occasion since the nation's birth, it wasn't until the game of golf was put on display for the world to see at the 1893 World's Columbian Exposition in Chicago that the sport began gathering a strong following of athletes and fans alike.

=== Plans For A Private Golf Course close to Chicago ===
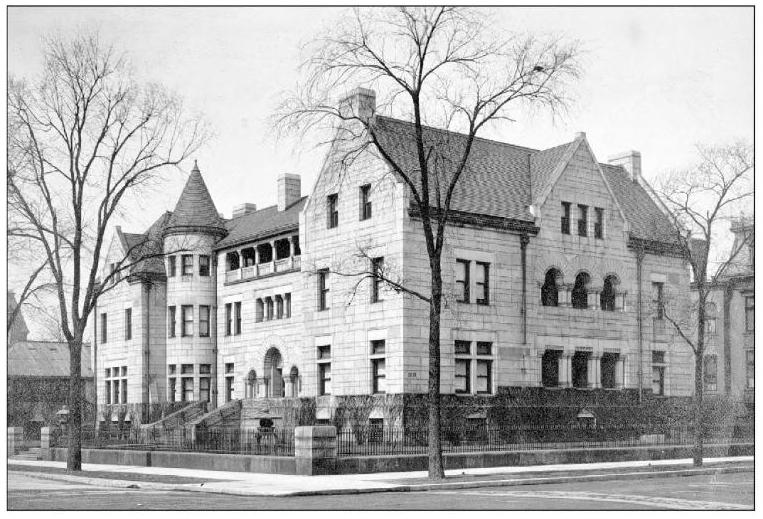
Site of the founding of the Midlothian Country Club Initial meetings which led to the formation of the Midlothian Country club were held in the living room of the residence of Harlow Niles Higinbotham at 2934 S. Michigan Avenue in Chicago. Higinbotham was the president of the World's Columbian Exposition and a director of The Northern Trust Bank and a director and partner of Marshall Field & Co. The house was demolished in 1920 and replaced by a service station.

In 1898, a group of wealthy industrialists, bankers and merchants decided to construct the Midlothian Country Club in the southwest outskirts of the City of Chicago. The designer for the course was Herbert James Tweedie, who would go on to form the Belmont Golf Club in 1899 and take over the previous location of the Chicago Golf Club.

The property purchased for such a course was farmland and fairly close to the Rexford Crossing whistle stop of the Rock Island Railroad. Although it was not typically a walkable venture to the country club, the club in the early years chose to shuttle its guests from the station via wagon and horse.

A unique feature of the 18-hole golf course is that every hole has a name.

=== Quickly Outgrowing Its Initial Plans ===
According to the introduction published in the 100 Year Anniversary book published by the Midlothian Country Club, it suggests the initial members did not want their location to become known, or in essence hiding the existence of the country club from individuals who patronize country clubs and other member's only groupings.

Within a matter of a few years after the Midlothian - Blue Island Railroad was built, the Midlothian Country Club gained some measure of positive attention in golf circles around the world.

=== The Midlothian - Blue Island Railroad ===
The route of the Midlothian and Blue Island Railroad

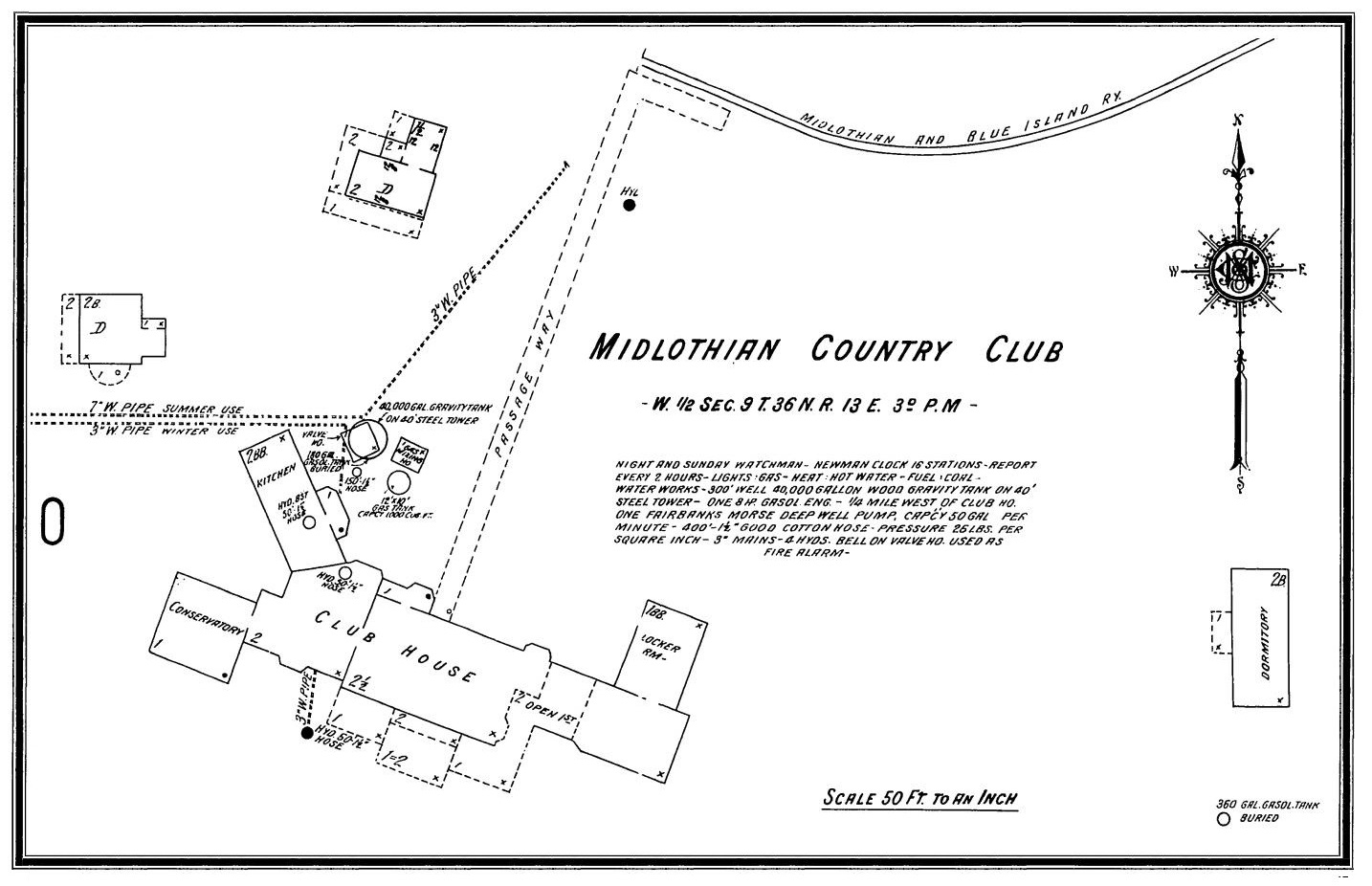
Map showing the layout of the tracks on the country club grounds.

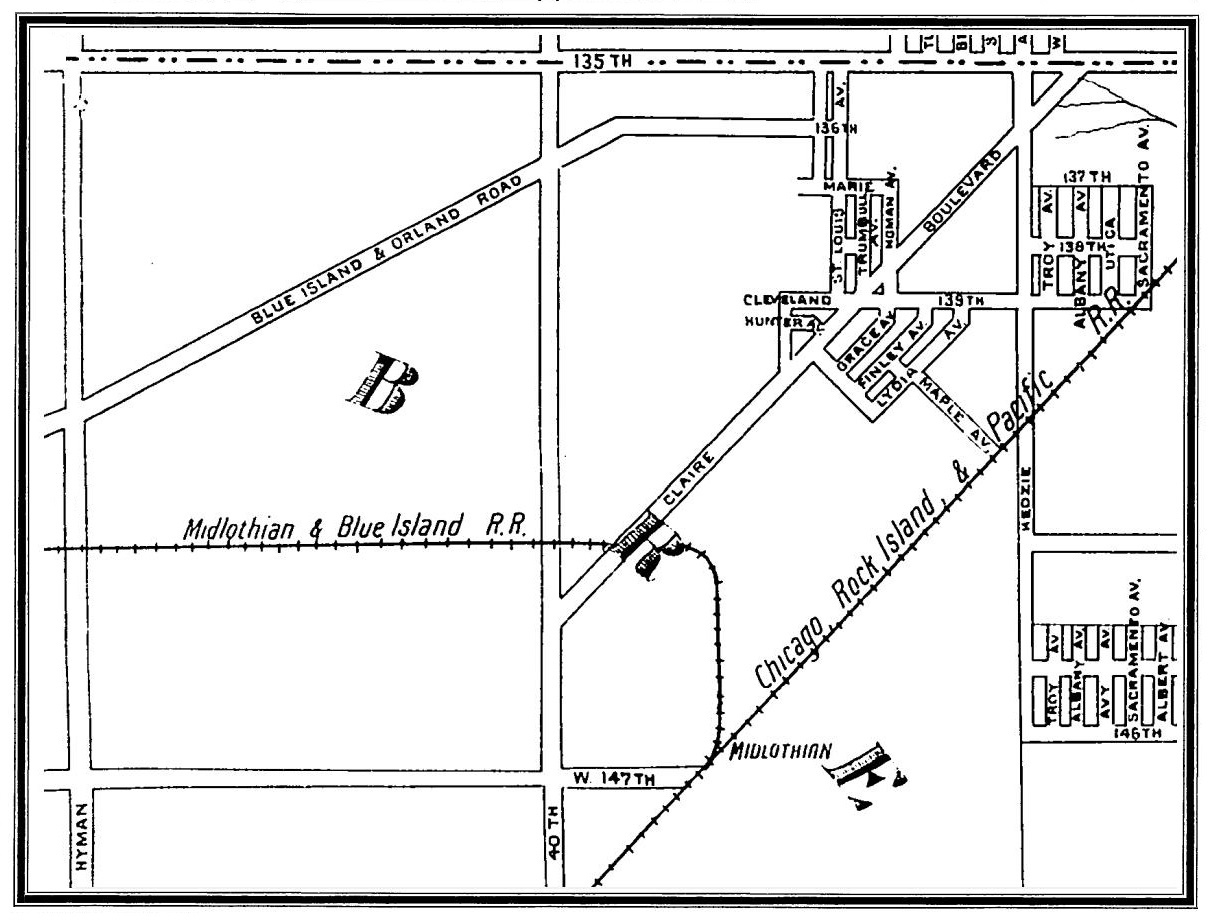
The route from the Midlothian Rock Island depot at 147th St. traveled north from the station over what is today Hamlin Ave.down to what is now 143rd St. then west to the Country Club

Sanborn maps (1911) showing the route of the Midlothian and Blue Island Railroad

When the club opened in 1898, its members were compelled to make the two mile journey from the Rock Island's Rexfords Corners railroad station over dirt roads that would become impassable during and after a rainstorm. To overcome this problem, in 1900 members of the club (who included John G. Shedd, Edward C. Potter, and E.P. Turner) chose to construct a railroad for a passenger train that would eventually travel 2.3 miles (3.7 km) up to fourteen times a day, providing transportation for its members and sometimes the caddies, except during the winter season. These tracks also had sidings which were sometimes used to "park" the private rail cars of members who would then stay the weekend for a golf event at the country club.

Part of the arrangement between the Midlothian - Blue Island Railroad and the Rock Island included the construction of a new train station about a quarter of a mile north of the old Rexford Crossing station, which was named "Midlothian", and the Rexfords Corners station was demolished.
After the village of Midlothian was incorporated in 1927, 147th Street was paved and the spur was no longer needed. Except for the first 670 feet near the Midlothian station which was retained by the Rock Island for use as a team track, the remainder of the line was removed in the fall of 1928, and today no trace of the line remains. The country club itself never owned any shares of the Midlothian - Blue Island Railroad; rather the stock holders were a group of individuals who were also members of the Midlothian Country Club.

=== Fox Hunting ===
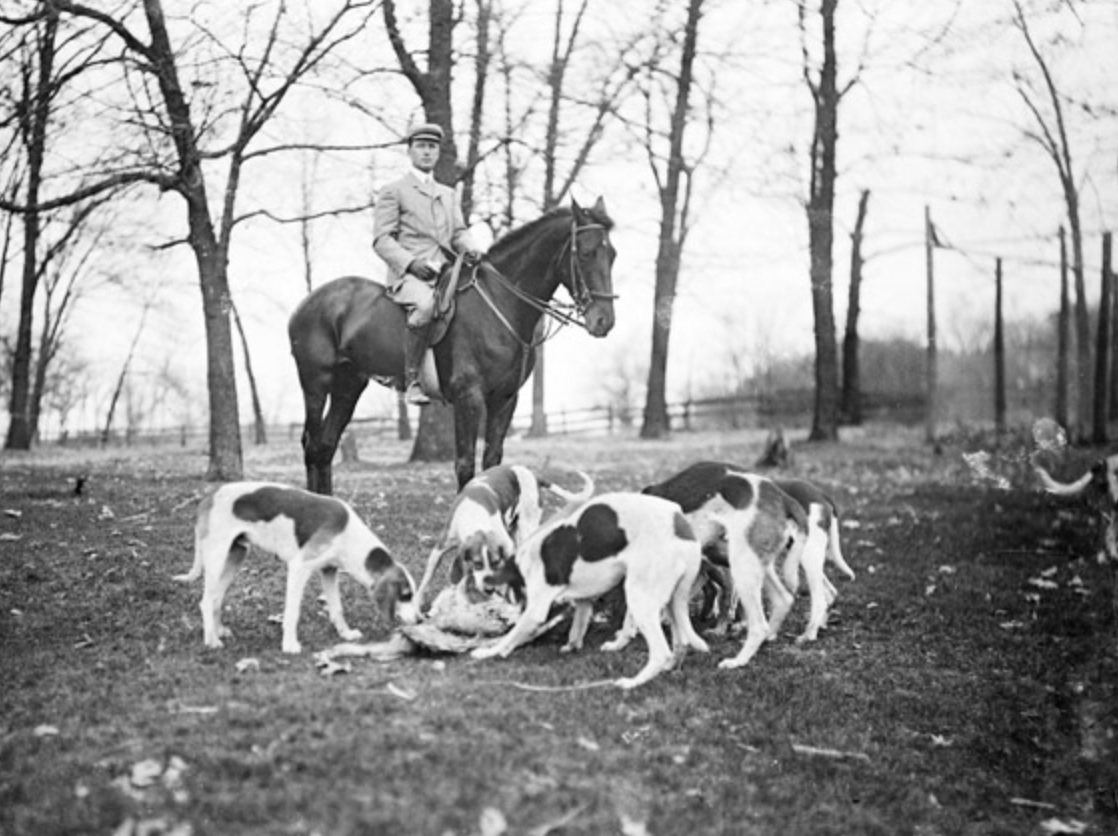
A Midlothian club rider with foxhounds, 1904

In the earlier days of the 20th Century, members of the club and their guests used to gather for fox hunting activities. The hunts were not held on club property, but rather on 1,500 acres of surrounding farmland that the members arranged to use with the blessing of the neighboring farmers. With this event, the club was seen as "rapidly becoming the Onwentsia of the South Side".

=== The Village of Midlothian Annexes the Midlothian Country Club ===
This property would remain under the governance of Bremen Township and subsequently Cook County until the annexation process of Bremen Heights into the Village of Midlothian was initiated in the mid to late 1950s and completed in the early 1960s.

== Notable Information ==
=== 1898 Members ===
John G. Shedd, George R. Thorne, R.H. Donnelly, Albert Spalding, Marshall Field,

=== Club Events ===
U.S. Open in 1914

Western Open 1901 - 1969 - 1973

Western Amateur 1901 - 1917

Western Junior Championship 2023

Pater-Filius Tournament (Father-Son Golf Tournament) 1903 - Present. The longest running father-son tournament in the nation.

Benedict Cup Tournament (Husband-Wife Golf Tournament). The longest running Husband-Wife Golf tournament in the nation.

=== Club Members/Pros ===
Tony Holquin - tour player and teaching professional

Brandon Adair - PGA Head Golf Professional 2013–Present

=== Midlothian Melodies: Mnemonic Maunderings of the Merry Muse ===
Just as the country club wanted to stay a controlled secret at first as a business strategy, one of the founding members, E. C. Potter composed a book in which select ownership of the book was determined to be that of a narrow list of individuals and no one else as it included the statement "For Private Circulation Only 1900" on one of the first few pages. It does not use the term "confidential" which kept elasticity in relation to copyright laws. The phrase simply prohibited duplication by any other publisher and warned that the book should not be loaned out in a library setting, as example.

Entitled Midlothian melodies: Mnemonic Maunderings of the Merry Muse, it was composed with intent on passages having been read at various events and then compiled into a book form. One "musing" was for the farewell party on September 30, 1899, for the soon to be former President George R. Thorne, one of the key players in the entire development process while others are passages contemplating the intricacies of the game of golf.

== Major tournaments ==
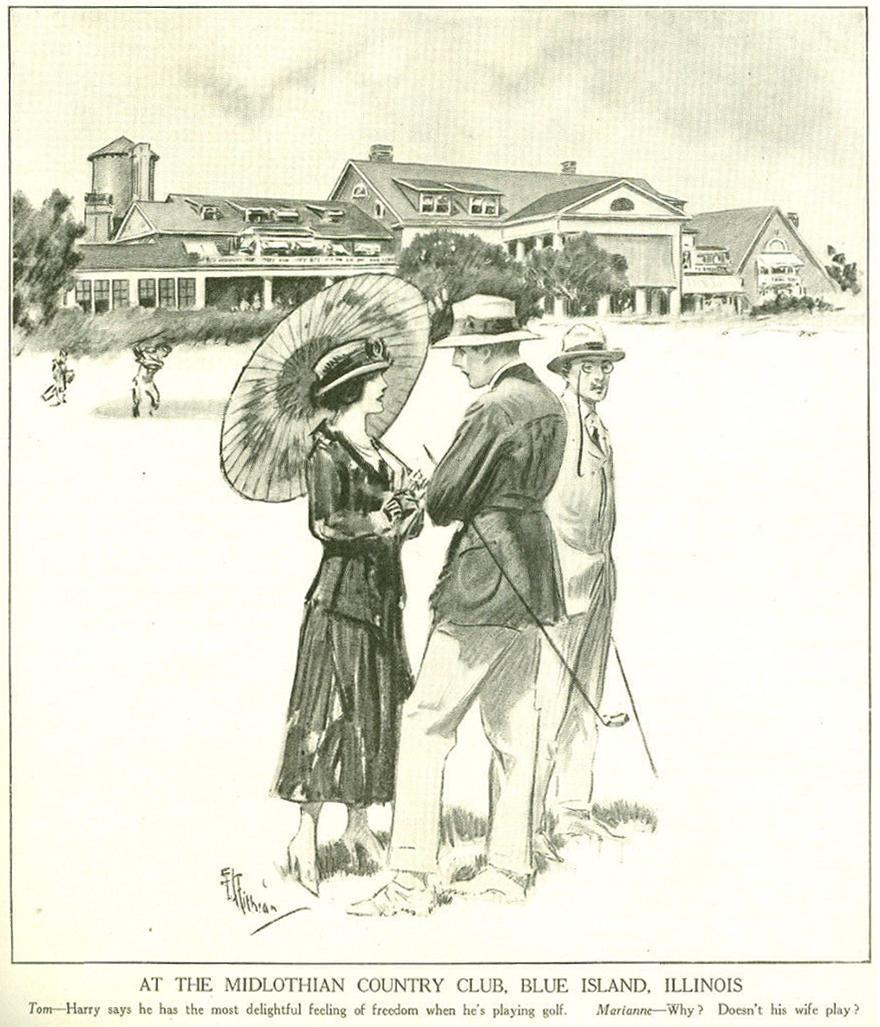
The Midlothian Country Club was in the national spotlight in 1916 when this cartoon appeared in the October 7th issue of Judge magazine. In January of that year the club had won the rights to sponsor the Western Amateur Golf Championship tournament, an honor which it had wrested away from the Omaha Country Club and the Del Monte Club of southern California. It was for this event that the Western Golf Association took the controversial step of abolishing the stymie, thus "eliminating one of the most discussed penalties of golf...for three-fourths of the United States and all of Canada."

- Western Open
  - 1901 Laurie Auchterlonie
  - 1969 Billy Casper
  - 1973 Billy Casper
- U.S. Open
  - 1914 Walter Hagen
- Hagen Invitational
  - 1939 Ralph Guldahl
- Chicago Victory National Open
  - 1948 Bobby Locke
- Western Amateur
  - 1901 Phelps Hoyt
  - 1917 Francis Ouimet
- Western Junior Championship
  - 2023 Hans Risvaer
- Women's Western Open
  - 1931 June Beebe
- U.S. Women's Amateur
  - 1907 Margaret Curtis
- Women's Western Amateur
  - 1907 Lillian French
  - 1911 Caroline Painter
  - 1915 Elaine Rosenthal
- Women's Western Junior
  - 1938 Jane Goodsill
