= Pauline Mackay =

American golfer (1878–1958)

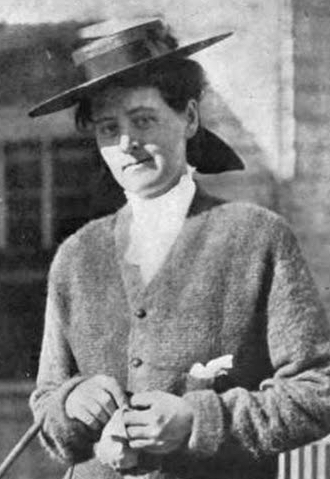
- Pauline Mackay Smith, from a 1909 publication.
- Born: Pauline Flora Mackay; 1878
- Died: 1958 (aged 79–80)
- Other names: Pauline Mackay Smith (after first marriage), Pauline Mackay Johnson (after second marriage)
- Occupation: Golfer
- Known for: American women's golf champion, 1905

Pauline Flora Mackay Smith Johnson (September 4, 1878 – November 12, 1958) was an American golfer and winner of the U.S. Women's Amateur in 1905.

== Early life ==
Mackay was born in Nantucket, Massachusetts, the daughter of George H. Mackay and Maria Mitchell Starbuck Mackay. She was descended from Nantucket whale oil merchant Joseph Starbuck. Her father was an avid amateur ornithologist, and her mother was a graduate of Vassar College. Pauline Mackay golfed on Nantucket as a young woman.

== Golf career ==
Mackay began golfing at Oakley Country Club in Watertown, Massachusetts when it opened in 1898. "She played with the steadiness and good judgment of a professional," commented one observer in 1901. In 1904, she was a semi-finalist in the U.S. Women's Amateur. She won the national women's title in 1905, defeating fellow Bostonian Margaret Curtis. "I think golf must be a sixth sense with me," she told an interviewer after that victory, "I love it so, and it came to me so naturally; but I do thoroughly believe no woman can become a proficient player without taking excellent care of her health... and I think the spirit of competition a woman feels in playing with men is a great aid in strengthening her game."

In the 1906 tournament, she was beaten in the second round but won the low-score medal.

== Personal life ==
Pauline Mackay married golfer and businessman Bruce Donald Smith, in Boston, in 1909. They lived in Chicago and had three children together before they divorced in 1920. By 1922, both Smiths had remarried, and Bruce Smith objected to continued alimony payments of $15,000 per year. A judge ruled that their alimony agreement was a perpetual obligation, not eliminated by subsequent events. In 1920, she inherited the "Middle Brick", a historic house on Nantucket's main street, built by her great-grandfather, Joseph Starbuck.

Mackay's second husband was Herbert Linsley Johnson of New York. They married in 1921. She was widowed when Johnson died in 1927. She died in 1958, aged 80 years, on Nantucket.
