= Mildred Caverly =

American amateur golfer (1893–1985)

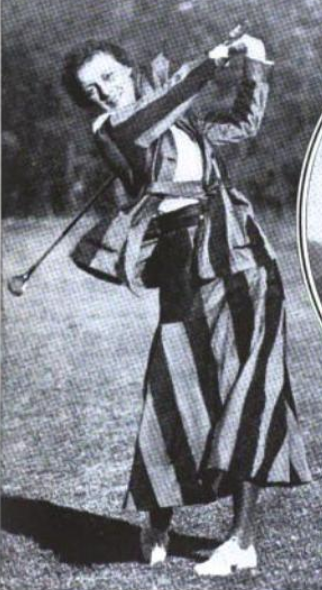
- Caverly from a 1917 issue of Vanity Fair
- Born: Mildred Irving Caverly; November 25, 1893; Washington, D.C., U.S.
- Died: June 12, 1985 (aged 91); Jenkintown, Pennsylvania, U.S.
- Other name: Mildred Caverly Marshall
- Occupation: Golfer

Mildred Irving Caverly Marshall (November 25, 1893 – June 12, 1985) was an American amateur golfer. She won the Philadelphia city championship in 1916 and 1918, and was runner-up at the U.S. Women's Amateur in 1916, losing to Alexa Stirling.

== Early life and education ==
Caverly was born in Washington, D.C., and raised in Philadelphia, the daughter of Robert B. Caverly and Mary Vesta Cutler Caverly.

== Career ==
Caverly was a member of the Philadelphia Cricket Club, the Philadelphia Country Club, and after she married, the Huntingdon Valley Country Club. She won women's tournaments at Shawnee in Pennsylvania and at Ekwanok Country Club in Vermont in 1913. She won the Philadelphia city championship in 1916 and 1918, and was runner-up at the U.S. Women's Amateur in 1916, losing to Alexa Stirling. She traveled to Ireland in 1920, and was the medalist in the British Ladies Amateur. Her letters home from this trip were compiled and published as A Young American Golfer in the British Championship. She competed for the Berthellyn Cup at Huntingdon Valley Country Club in 1921 and in total eight times, advancing to the match play stage, the low sixteen medalists, each year she competed

== Personal life ==
Caverly married mining engineer Edward Everett Marshall of the Huntingdon Valley Country Club in 1922, as his second wife. Her husband died in 1946, and she died in 1985, at the age of 91, in Jenkintown, Pennsylvania. Her son Ed Marshall was president of the Golf Association of Philadelphia in the 1960s, and served on the executive committee of the United States Golf Association.
