= 1932 Curtis Cup =

Golf competition in Virginia Water, Surrey, England

Coordinates: 51.399°N 0.592°W

1st Curtis Cup Match
- Dates: 21 May 1932
- Venue: Wentworth Golf Club (East Course)
- Location: Virginia Water, Surrey, England
- Captains: Joyce Wethered (Great Britain); Marion Hollins (USA)
(United Kingdom)	3 1/2	5 1/2	(United States)
- United States wins the Curtis Cup

The 1st Curtis Cup Match was played on 21 May 1932 at Wentworth Golf Club in Virginia Water, Surrey, England. The United States won 5 1/2 to 3 1/2.

The match was played on the East course, measuring about 6,000 yards. The foursomes began at 10:30 am and the singles at 2 pm. All the match pairings were announced the previous day. Britain used all 8 of their players while the Americans used the same six in both sessions. The United States won all three foursomes matches and, although Britain did better in the afternoon, America won two singles matches and won the contest.

== Format ==
The contest was played in a single day, with three foursomes in the morning and six singles matches in the afternoon, a total of 9 points.

Each of the 9 matches was worth one point in the larger team competition. If a match was all square after the 18th hole extra holes were not played. Rather, each side earned 1/2 a point toward their team total. The team that accumulated at least 5 points won the competition.

== Teams ==
Eight players for Great Britain & Ireland and USA participated in the event. Both teams had a playing captain, although the American captain, Marion Hollins, was one of the two reserves.

Great Britain
Name	Notes
(England) Joyce Wethered	playing captain
(England) Elsie Corlett
(England) Diana Fishwick
(England) Molly Gourlay
(England) Wanda Morgan
(Scotland) Doris Park
(Scotland) Charlotte Watson
(England) Enid Wilson

Team USA
Name	Notes
Marion Hollins	captain, reserve
Leona Cheney
Helen Hicks
Dorothy Higbie	reserve
Opal Hill
Maureen Orcutt
Virginia Van Wie
Glenna Vare

The American reserves, Marion Hollins and Dorothy Higbie, did not play in any matches.

== Morning foursomes ==
	Results
Wethered/Morgan	(United States) 1 up	Vare/Hill
Wilson/Watson	(United States) 2 & 1	Van Wie/Hicks
Gourlay/Park	(United States) 1 up	Orcutt/Cheney
0	Session	3
0	Overall	3

== Afternoon singles ==
	Results
Joyce Wethered	(United Kingdom) 6 & 4	Glenna Vare
Enid Wilson	(United Kingdom) 2 & 1	Helen Hicks
Wanda Morgan	(United States) 2 & 1	Virginia Van Wie
Diana Fishwick	(United Kingdom) 4 & 3	Maureen Orcutt
Molly Gourlay	halved	Opal Hill
Elsie Corlett	(United States) 5 & 3	Leona Cheney
3 1/2	Session	2 1/2
3 1/2	Overall	5 1/2
