= 1937 Women's Western Open =

Golf tournament

Coordinates: 41°44′05″N 87°41′05″W

The 1937 Women's Western Open was a golf competition held at Beverly Country Club in Chicago, Illinois. It was the 8th edition of the Women's Western Open. Helen Hicks won the championship in match play competition by defeating Bea Barrett in the final match, 6 and 5.
