= Beatrix Hoyt =

American amateur golfer (1880–1963)

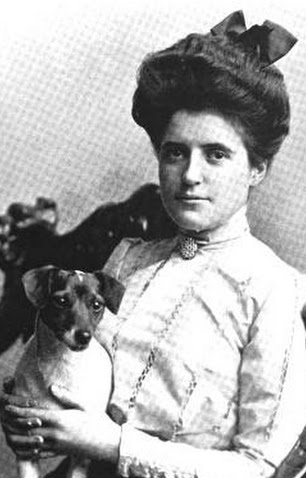
- Hoyt in 1901

Personal information
- Nationality: United States
- Born: July 5, 1880 Westchester County, New York, U.S.
- Died: August 14, 1963 (aged 83) Ponte Vedra Beach, Florida, U.S.

Career
- Sport: Golf
- Status: Amateur

Beatrix Hoyt (July 5, 1880 – August 14, 1963) was an American amateur golfer. Hoyt is the third youngest golfer to ever win the U.S. Women's Amateur, and is one of only five competitors to win the championship three consecutive times.

Hoyt was born in Westchester County, New York, the youngest of William Sprague Hoyt and Janet Ralston Chase's four children. The Hoyts were a distinguished family. Beatrix's paternal great-grandfather, William Sprague, served as Governor of Rhode Island. Her maternal grandfather was Salmon P. Chase (1808–1873), the U.S. Secretary of the Treasury under President Lincoln and later, Chief Justice of the United States.

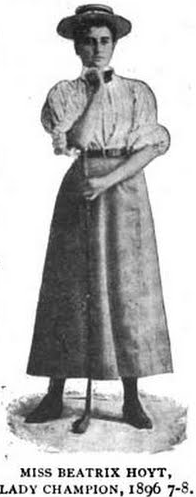
Beatrix Hoyt, from an 1898 publication.

A member of the Shinnecock Hills Golf Club in Southampton, New York, which encouraged juniors and females to play the game, in 1896, at the age of 16, and after only two years of playing golf, Hoyt won the U.S. Women's Amateur, making her the youngest woman to win until Laura Baugh's victory in 1971. She went on to win the championship the following two years as well. She was also the medalist for shooting the lowest score in the tournament's qualifying round, something she would accomplish for five straight years. 1896 was the second edition of the championship and the first year that the Robert Cox Cup was awarded to the winner. With partner William Sands, in November 1897, she won the mixed foursome championship at Westchester Country Club. At age 19, she retired from competitive golf after losing to Margaret Curtis in the semi-final round at the 1900 tournament, ultimately pursuing a career in sculpture and landscape painting.
