= Alexa Stirling =

American-Canadian amateur golfer (1897–1977)

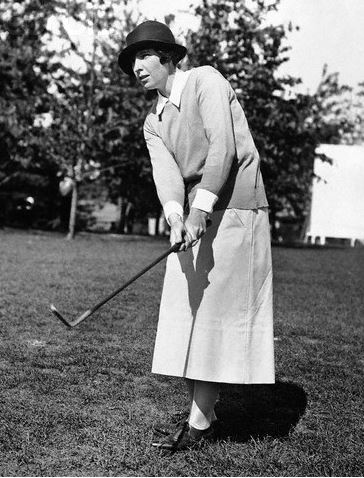
- Alexa Stirling, c. 1919

Personal information
- Nationality: United States; Canada
- Born: September 5, 1897 Atlanta, Georgia, U.S.
- Died: April 15, 1977 (aged 79) Ottawa, Ontario, Canada
- Spouse: Dr. Wilbert G. Fraser
- Children: 3

Career
- Sport: Golf
- Status: Amateur

Achievements and awards
- Georgia Sports Hall of Fame: 1978
- Canadian Golf Hall of Fame: 1986
- Georgia Golf Hall of Fame: 1989

Alexa Stirling Fraser (September 5, 1897 – April 15, 1977) was an American-Canadian amateur golfer. She won the U.S. Women's Amateur golf championship in 1916, 1919, and 1920. She also won the Canadian Women's Amateur title in 1920 and 1934.

== Early life ==
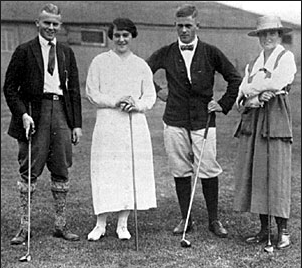
(left to right) Perry Adair, Elaine Rosenthal, Bobby Jones and Alexa Stirling at the Red Cross exhibition match at the Montclair Golf Club in 1918

Born in Atlanta, Georgia, Stirling was the daughter of Dr. Alexander W. Stirling and Nora Bromley Stirling.

She was coached in golf from a young age at the Atlanta Athletic Club's East Lake Golf Club course by Stewart Maiden, the club's professional, who had learned his golf at Carnoustie, Scotland. At age 13 her golf skills were already evident when on May 15, 1911, she was the low qualifier in the Women's Southern Golf Association championship.

Stirling solidified her reputation as a youthful prodigy when she won three consecutive U.S. Women's Amateurs. She won her first in 1916. When no tournaments were held during 1917 and 1918 while the United States participated in World War I, Stirling became one of the famous "Dixie Kids", a group of young Southern golfers which included her long-time friend Bobby Jones, Elaine Rosenthal, and Perry Adair, who toured around the United States, giving golf exhibitions to raise money for the Red Cross. Stirling was a friend of James Douglas Edgar and took golf lessons from him when he was the professional at Druid Hills Golf Club. Stirling was also a skilled and enthusiastic violinist. She performed a public violin solo at age seven.

== Golf career ==
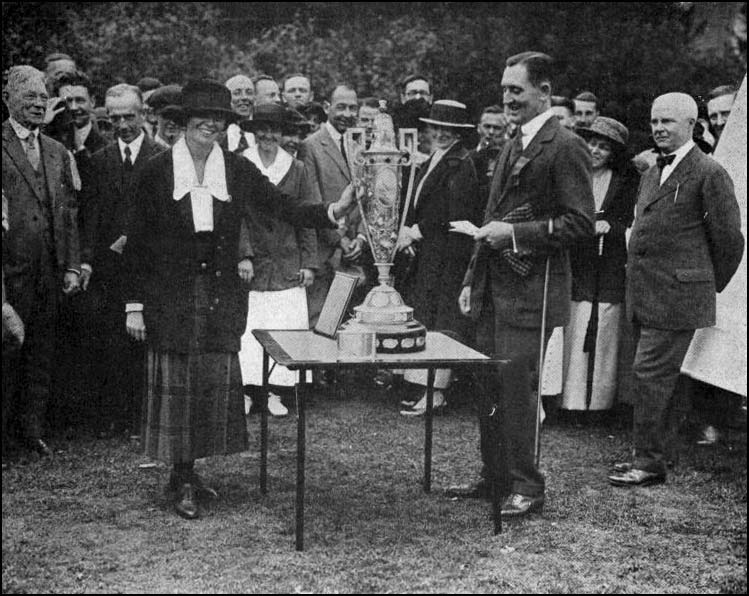
The 1919 Women's Amateur trophy presentation

After the war, she came back to win the 1919 and 1920 U.S. Women's Amateur titles. In 1920, she would also win her second Berthellyn Cup, held annually at the Huntingdon Valley Country Club, just north of Philadelphia. Her first victory there had come in 1916, the year of her first U.S. Amateur title. She was also the U.S. Amateur runner-up in 1921 to Marion Hollins, in 1923 to Edith Cummings, and again in 1925 to Glenna Collett, a year when she broke Dorothy Campbell's single-round scoring record in qualifying. Although she did not make it to the finals in the 1927 championship, in the third round she defeated Simone de la Chaume, the British Ladies Amateur champion.

=== U.S. Women's Amateur ===
Stirling won the U.S. Women's Amateur golf title three times: in 1916, 1919, and 1920. She was the runner-up in 1921, 1923, and 1925.

=== Canadian Women's Amateur ===
In 1920 she won the Canadian Women's Amateur, and after finishing second in 1921 and 1925 in that event, she won the Canadian title again in 1934. She married Canadian doctor Wilbert G. Fraser in 1925, and made her home in Ottawa, Ontario, where she became an honorary member of the Royal Ottawa Golf Club, and was its ladies' champion nine times.

== Later life ==
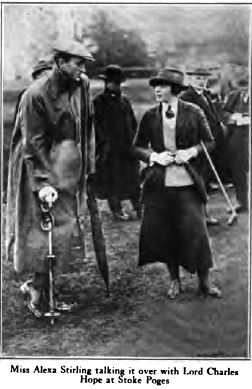
Alexa Stirling, Who's who among the women of California

Throughout her life Alexa Stirling Fraser maintained her interest in golf, and during the 1976 United States Bicentennial celebrations she returned to Atlanta for the U.S. Open. She once wrote, "The player who is going to win most often is not the one who is superior in strength of distance, but the one who can make the fewest mistakes and keep out of as much trouble as possible, but when once in trouble can cope with any situation."

In 1921, she started working in banking for S. W. Straus & Co. in New York.

== Death and legacy ==
Stirling died on April 15, 1977, at home in Ottawa, Ontario, Canada. She was posthumously inducted into the Georgia Sports Hall of Fame in 1978, the Canadian Golf Hall of Fame in 1986, and the Georgia Golf Hall of Fame in 1989.

She was also portrayed by Stephanie Sparks in the 2004 film, Bobby Jones: A Stroke of Genius.
