= Marion Hollins =

American golfer and golf course architect

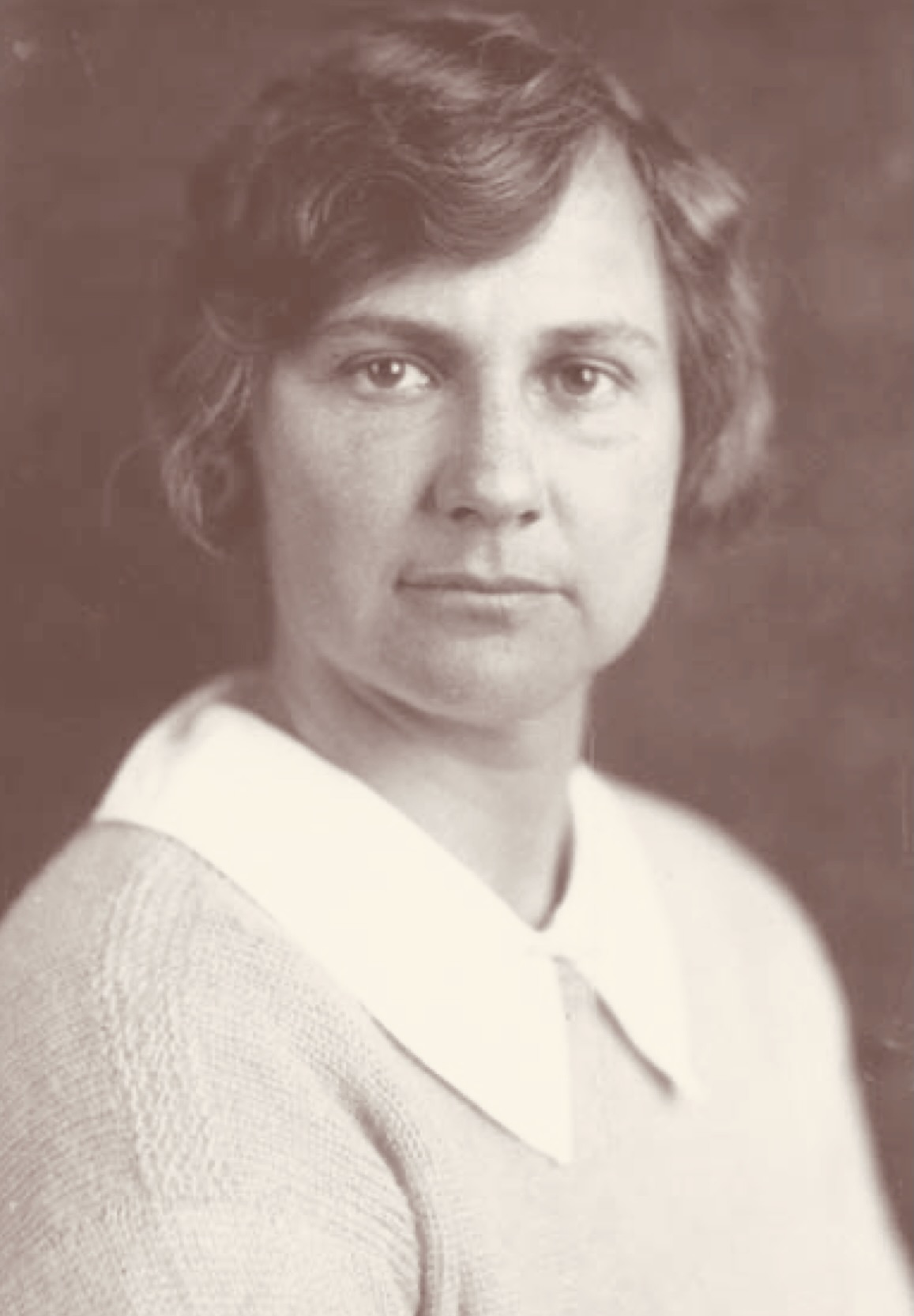
- Hollins in 1922
- Born: Marion B. Hollins; December 3, 1892; Manhattan, New York City, US
- Died: August 27, 1944 (aged 51); Pacific Grove, California, US
- Occupation: golfer

Marion B. Hollins (December 3, 1892 – August 27, 1944) was an American amateur golfer. She is known as an athlete and as a golf course developer (a rarity among women). She won the 1921 U.S. Women's Amateur and was runner-up in 1913. She also had many other amateur wins. She was the captain of the first U.S. Curtis Cup team in 1932.

== Early life ==
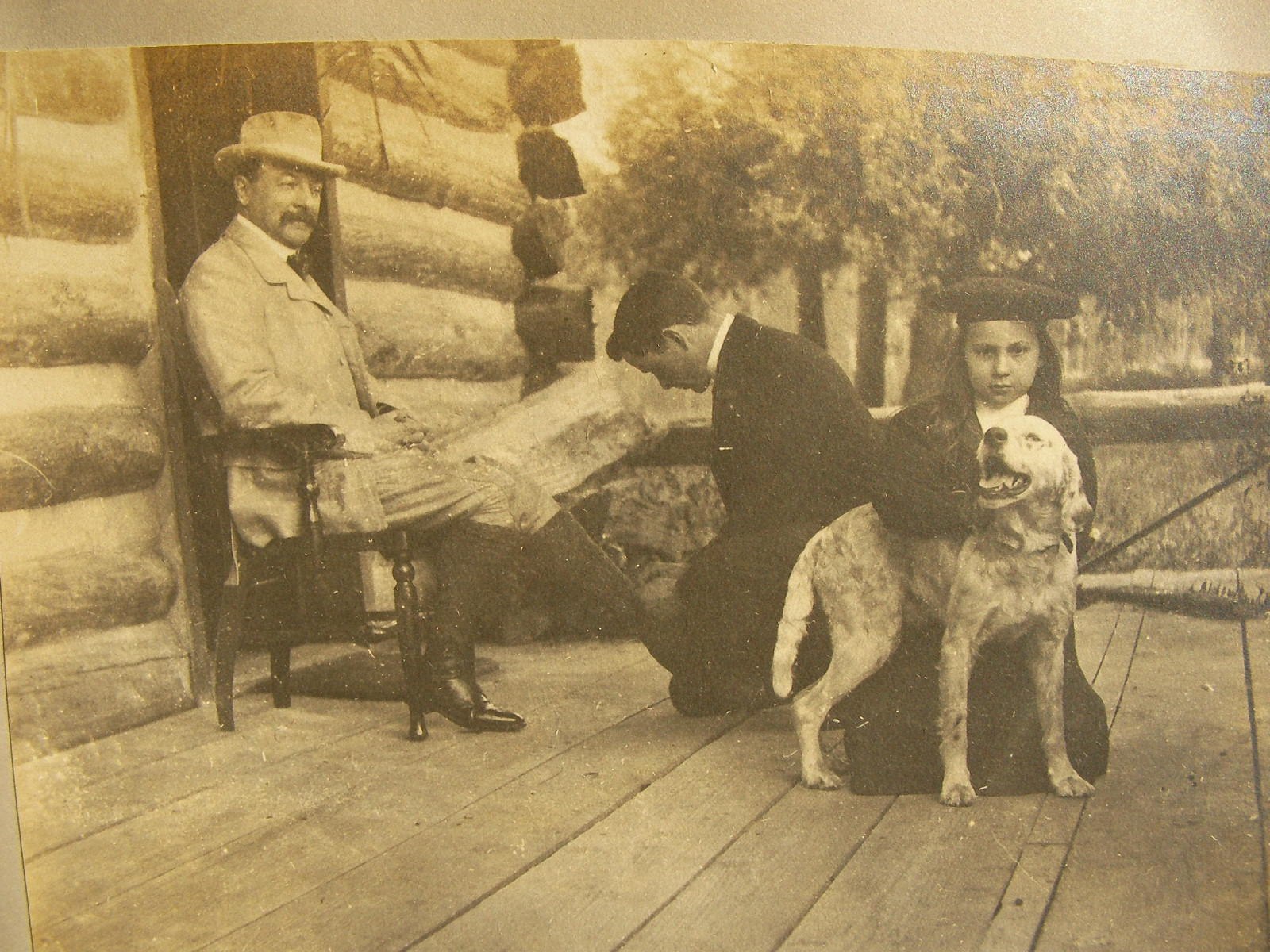
Hollins at age eleven (far right) with her father, H. B. Hollins (far left).

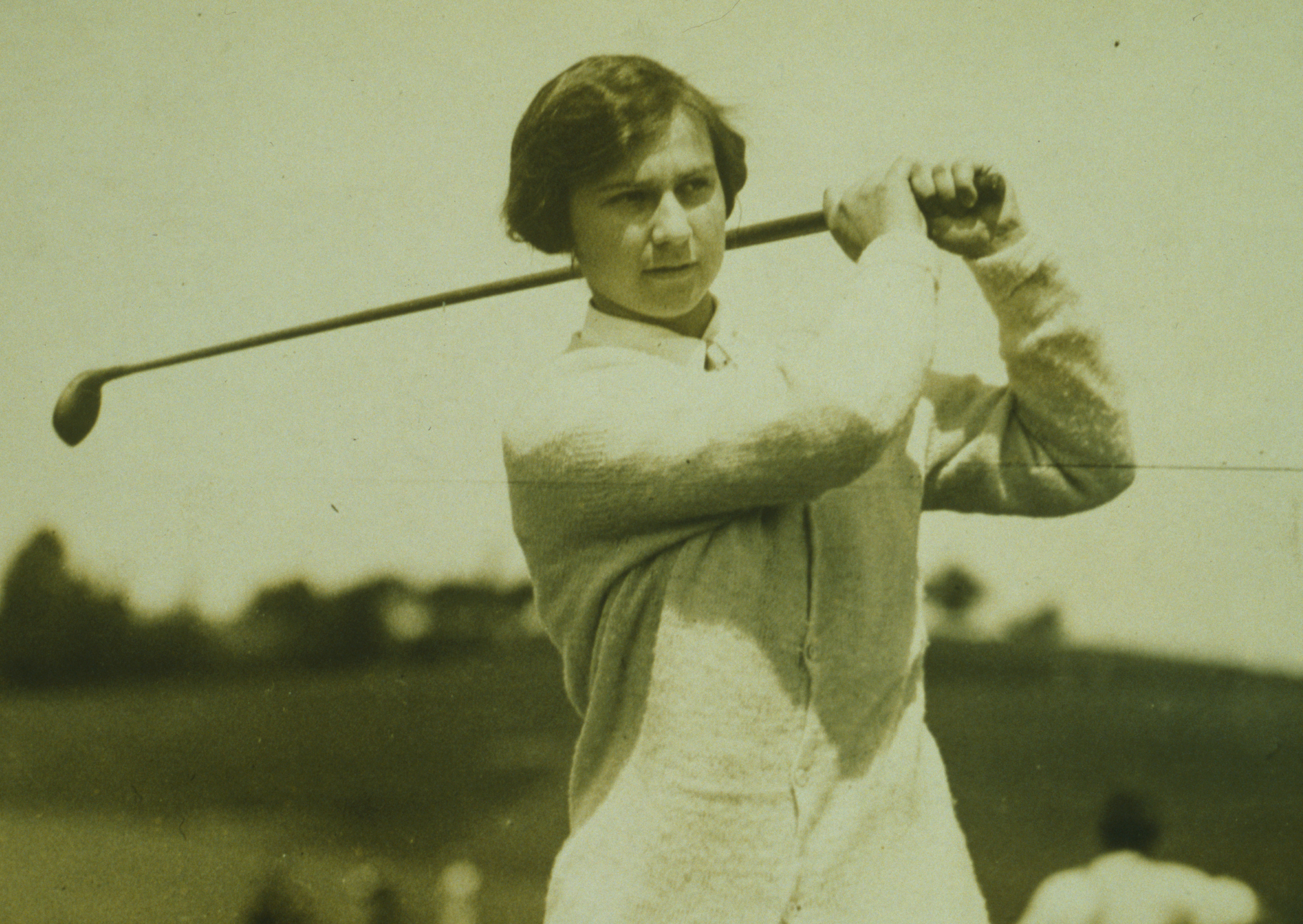
Hollins golfing in 1916

Hollins was born on December 3, 1892, in East Islip, New York. Her father, Henry (Harry) Bowly Hollins Sr. (1854–1938), owned a Wall Street brokerage firm, H.B. Hollins & Co. Her mother was Evelina Meserole Knapp (1854–1938). The family lived on the 600 acres (240 ha) Meadow Farm at East Islip on Long Island. By 18, Hollins learned how to ride and drive horses, row, swim, play tennis, and golf. She won a four-in-hand carriage competition against male drivers. In 1913, she was runner-up in the U.S. Women's Metropolitan Amateur, and at 20 she won the Metropolitan Amateur and went into the finals of the U.S. Women's Amateur.

In 1916, Hollins came to California to play polo with the Sam Mateo team.

== Career ==
In 1919, Hollins accepted an invitation to play in the Berthellyn Cup at the Huntingdon Valley Country Club in Philadelphia. Her qualifying score of 98, fourth lowest, allowed her to advance to match play but she was eliminated in the quarterfinals. Hollins returned in 1920, her last Berthellyn Cup, and lost again in the quarterfinals this time to Alexa Stirling, the eventual tournament champion. Hollins would get her revenge in 1921 when she beat Stirling in the finals of the U.S. Women's Amateur at the Hollywood Golf Club.

Hollins returned to California as early as 1920 to play polo on the Pebble Beach men's polo team, and play golf at the Pebble Beach Golf Links. She set a women's record with a score of 90. Hollins then bought a piece of property overlooking the Pebble Beach course and Carmel Bay.

Hollins moved to the Monterey Peninsula in 1922 where she met S.F.B. Morse and began working as athletic director for Del Monte Properties.

The first Pebble Beach Championship for Women was played February 9–12, 1923, with Hollins as champion over defeated Doreen Kavanaugh in the final match. Hollins won the Pebble Beach Championship title six times (1924-1926, 1928, 1933, and 1942).

In her time, she helped develop three world-class golf courses: The Women's National Golf and Tennis Club in Glen Head, Long Island, New York; Cypress Point Club, and Pasatiempo Golf Club. Hollins was responsible for hiring Alister MacKenzie to design Cypress Point and Pasatiempo. Seth Raynor routed Cypress Point but died before it was built; she was ultimately the reason Bobby Jones hired MacKenzie to design Augusta National Golf Club.

In 1927, Hollins bought 2,000 acres (810 ha) in Carmel Valley from Morse's Del Monte Properties, where she entertained guests such as Sir Montagu Allan, his wife, and daughter from Montreal, Canada. In 1936, she sold 1,000 acres (400 ha) of her ranch to real estate developer Frank B. Porter Hollins for $32,000 (equivalent to $742,446 in 2025).

"Of all the wealthy and privileged friends around the world she'd treated with such generosity and warmth throughout her life, only her former employer at Pebble Beach, Samuel Morse, stepped forward to help. He saw to it that Marion was moved back to Pebble Beach and gave her a house rent-free, and a face-saving title, with no actual responsibilities, at his Del Monte Corporation."

— Mark Frost, The Match

In December 1937, Hollins was in an automobile accident near Watsonville, that caused lasting physical and mental injuries.

After the Wall Street Crash of 1929, Hollins was forced to sell property she had in Big Sur and her Pasatiempo home. Morse stepped in and helped Hollins get back on her feet with work at the Del Monte Properties Company. Hollins played golf with friends or hotel guests. In 1942, she won the Pebble Beach Women's Championship for the eighth and final time.

== Death ==
Hollins died from complications of a stroke on August 27, 1944, in Pacific Grove, California, at the age of 51, and was buried in Monterey, California.

== Legacy ==
Hollins was inducted posthumously into the Suffolk Sports Hall of Fame on Long Island in the Golf and Historic Recognition Categories with the Class of 2002. She was inducted into the World Golf Hall of Fame in 2021.

== Team appearances ==
- Curtis Cup (representing the United States): 1932 (winners, playing captain)
