= Virginia Van Wie =

American golfer (1909-1997)

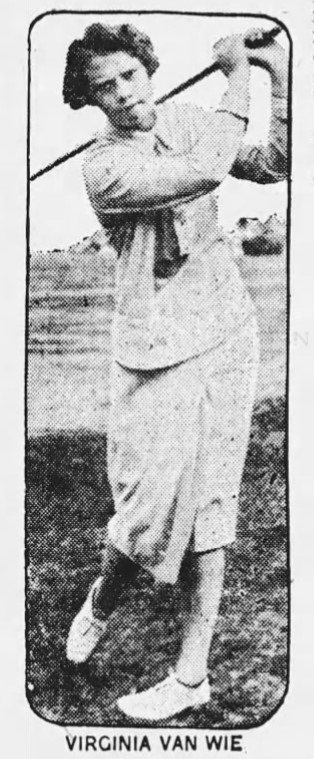

Personal information
- Full name: Virginia Van Wie
- Nationality: United States
- Born: February 9, 1909 Chicago, Illinois, U.S.
- Died: February 18, 1997 (aged 88) Big Rapids, Michigan, U.S.

Career
- Sport: Golf

Achievements and awards
- U.S. Women's Amateur winner: 1932, 1933, 1934
- AP Female Athlete of the Year: 1934
- Women's Golf Hall of Fame inductee: 1950

Virginia Van Wie (February 9, 1909 – February 18, 1997) was an American amateur golfer, best known for winning three U.S. Women's Amateurs, 1932–34. The Illinois-born golfer was the daughter of wealthy parents and learned the game at the Beverly Country Club, and during the summers she would go with her parents to summer homes in Michigan and Florida and compete with the best. Van Wie was a student of golf instructor Ernest Jones.

== Early life ==
While at the age of 16 and still attending Lindblom High School in Chicago—in 1925 when the school did not have a golf team—Van Wie first emerged as an extraordinary golfer. In the summer that year, the newspapers first noticed Van Wie when she won the Western Michigan championship and then won the Western Junior championship, and upset several top golfers in other tournaments.

== Golf career ==
In 1926, Van Wie beat the national champion, Glenna Collett, for the East Coast Florida championship and began a string of three Chicago District golf titles. At the 1928 and 1930 U.S. Women's Amateurs, Van Wie lost in the finals to Glenna Collett. In the 1929 event, she tied for the medal for lowest score in the qualifying rounds.

=== U.S. Women's Amateur ===
Van Wie broke through to national fame in 1932, when she beat Collett for the first of her three consecutive national amateur titles. After winning her final championship in 1934, and based on her performance for the entire year, she earned the 1934 Associated Press Female Athlete of the Year and was proclaimed the "world's greatest female golfer."

=== Curtis Cup ===
Van Wie was a member of the American team that won the first Curtis Cup played at the Wentworth Golf Club in England in 1932 and was part of the team that won it again in 1934.

Van Wie retired in 1935 without defending her national title, and then taught golf in the Chicago area for more than thirty years.

== Death and legacy ==
Van Wie died on February 18, 1997, aged 88, at her home in Big Rapids, Michigan. In 1950, she was inducted into the Women's Golf Hall of Fame.

== Awards and honors ==
- In 1934, she was christened by the Associated Press' as their Female Athlete of the Year.
- In 1950, she was inducted into the Women's Golf Hall of Fame.

== Team appearances ==
Amateur

- Curtis Cup (representing the United States): 1932 (winners), 1934 (winners)
