= Robert Henry Caverly =

American electrical engineer

Robert Henry Caverly from Villanova University, Villanova, PA was named Fellow of the Institute of Electrical and Electronics Engineers (IEEE) in 2013 for contributions to modeling and design of radio frequency switching devices, and became a Life Fellow of the IEEE in 2020.

== Early life ==
Born in Cincinnati, Ohio in 1954, he received his Ph.D. degree in electrical engineering from The Johns Hopkins University in 1983. and a M.S.E.E and B.S.E.E degrees from the North Carolina State University in 1978 and 1976, respectively. He is the older son of Janet and Robert H Caverly and grew up in Greensboro and Fayetteville, NC. He has one sibling, a sister, Janet (Anne). He was first introduced to electronics by fixing the family televisions and by also received a small commercial shortwave receiver for a Christmas present. He was intrigued by the idea of hearing stations from all over the world, and eventually built a vacuum-tube shortwave receiver and obtained his amateur radio license in 1970, and eventually obtained his Extra Class license (WB4PWZ), which he still holds and is still active. He graduated from Reid Ross High School in Fayetteville, NC in 1972. He married Margery (née Miller) Caverly (Maggie) in 1979, and they have two sons, Robert William Caverly (married to Sarah Hartmann) and Matthew Tucker Caverly (married to Dr. Jennifer Preston).

== Career Biography ==
He is a faculty member at Villanova University in the Department of Electrical and Computer Engineering since 1997, and became an Emeritus Professor in 2024. Previously, he was a Professor for more than 14 years at the University of Massachusetts Dartmouth. Dr. Caverly's research interests are focused on the characterization of semiconductor devices such as PIN diodes and FETs in the microwave and RF control environment, including communication systems, reconfigurable systems and magnetic resonance imaging scanners. He has published more than 100 journal and conference papers in both technology and pedagogy, and is the author of the books Microwave and RF Semiconductor Control Device Modeling (2016) and CMOS RFIC Design Principles (2007), both from Artech House. An IEEE Life Fellow, Dr. Caverly is the Editor-in-Chief of the IEEE Microwave Magazine (2018–2026), a Track Editor for the IEEE Journal of Microwaves, an ex-officio member of the Microwave Theory and Technology Society (MTT-S) Administrative Committee, and a member of the Biomedical Applications (MTT-28) and HF-VHF-UHF Technology (MTT-20) Technical Committees of the MTT-S. He was appointed a Distinguished Microwave Lecturer during the period 2014-2016 with the talk 'RF Aspects of Magnetic Resonance Imaging' and is also a member of the MTT-S Speakers Bureau for talks on MRI as well as high speed reconfigurable switching. He was awarded the Outstanding Faculty Research Award at Villanova University in 2020, the Villanova University College of Engineering Alumni Association Outstanding Teacher of the Year, also in 2020, two Father Farrell Awards for Outstanding Service in the College of Engineering at Villanova University in 2007 and 2013, and the Dow Outstanding Young Faculty Award, awarded by the Dow Chemical Co. through ASEE in 1987

His IEEE Xplore profile can be found at https://ieeexplore.ieee.org/author/37275058800 .
