= U.S. Women's Amateur =

Golf tournament

Tournament information
- Location: Ooltewah, Tennessee (2026)
- Course: Honors Course (2026)
- Par: 72 (2026)
- Length: 6,539 yd (5,979 m) (2026)
- Organized by: USGA
- Format: Stroke play and match play
- Month played: August
- Website: Official website

Current champion
- (United States) Asterisk Talley

The U.S. Women's Amateur, also known as the United States Women's Amateur Golf Championship, is the leading golf tournament in the United States for female amateur golfers. It is played annually and is one of the 13 United States national golf championships organized by the United States Golf Association (USGA). Female amateurs from all nations are eligible to compete and there are no age restrictions. It was established in 1895, one month after the men's U.S. Amateur and U.S. Open. It is the third oldest USGA championship, over a half century older than the U.S. Women's Open, which was first played in 1946. Along with the British Ladies Amateur, the U.S. Women's Amateur is considered the highest honor in women's amateur golf.

== Robert Cox Cup ==
Since 1896 the Robert Cox Cup has been awarded annually by the USGA to the winner. The trophy was donated by Robert Cox of Edinburgh, Scotland, a member of the British Parliament and a golf course designer. It remains the oldest surviving trophy awarded for a USGA championship. Along with a gold medal, a replica of the 2-foot-high (0.61 m) silver case of Etruscan design is given to the tournament winner. The original trophy is on permanent display at the USGA Museum and Library. The Robert Cox Cup is the only USGA trophy donated by someone from another country.

The first tournament attracted a field of 13 and was played over 18 holes. As in the case of the men's U.S. Amateur, entry was originally restricted to members of USGA-affiliated private clubs (and, presumably, international players who were members of clubs affiliated with their nations' golf governing bodies); this policy remained in place until the 1979 tournament. Several thousand women now enter the event, and the USGA conducts sectional qualifying to reduce the number of contestants to a more manageable number. The main tournament opens with two rounds of stroke play. The leading 64 players then compete in a match play competition. The matches are played over 18 holes except for the final, which is played over 36 holes.

In 1956, Ann Gregory became the first African American to compete in the Championship, held that year at the Meridian Hills Country Club in Indianapolis.

There are no age restrictions on entry. Players must have a handicap index of 5.4 or less. Morgan Pressel qualified as a 13-year-old in 2001 and won in 2005 at the age of 17. The 2006 winner Kimberly Kim was only 14 years old, breaking the record previously held by Laura Baugh. In 2007, Pearl Jin and Alexis Thompson became the first 12-year-olds to qualify and the first to advance to match play. Jin and Thompson faced one another in the third round match play. Thompson beat Jin, but then lost in the quarterfinals.

Because the tournament is dominated by teenagers and college-age players who are working toward careers as tournament professionals, the USGA introduced a separate tournament in 1987 for players age 25 and over, called the U.S. Women's Mid-Amateur. It gives older amateur players an opportunity to compete among themselves for a national title; entrants must have a handicap index of 9.4 or less.

The USGA rates Glenna Collett Vare as the most noteworthy champion who won the Robert Cox Cup a record six times. Several U.S. Women's Amateur champions who have gone on to become leading professionals including Patty Berg, Babe Zaharias, Louise Suggs and Beth Daniel.

The two finalists earn exemptions to the ensuing U.S. Women's Open, and the winner also earns exemptions to The Women's Open Championship and upon turning 50, the U.S. Senior Women's Open (one year exemption for players who eventually turned professional, and five years for players who did not turn professional).

== Winners ==
| Year | Venue | Winner | Score | Runner-up |
|---|---|---|---|---|
| 2026 | Honors Course | (United States) Asterisk Talley | 8 & 6 | (Japan) Anna Iwanaga |
| 2025 | Bandon Dunes Golf Resort | (United States) Megha Ganne | 4 & 3 | (United States) Brooke Biermann |
| 2024 | Southern Hills Country Club | (Philippines) Rianne Malixi | 3 & 2 | (United States) Asterisk Talley |
| 2023 | Bel-Air Country Club | (United States) Megan Schofill | 4 & 3 | (United States) Latanna Stone |
| 2022 | Chambers Bay | (Japan) Saki Baba | 11 & 9 | (Canada) Monet Chun |
| 2021 | Westchester Country Club | (United States) Jensen Castle | 2 & 1 | (Chinese Taipei) Hou Yu-chiang |
| 2020 | Woodmont Country Club | (United States) Rose Zhang | 38 holes | (Australia) Gabriela Ruffels |
| 2019 | Old Waverly Golf Club | (Australia) Gabriela Ruffels | 1 up | (Switzerland) Albane Valenzuela |
| 2018 | Golf Club of Tennessee | (United States) Kristen Gillman (2) | 7 & 6 | (South Korea) Jeon Ji-won |
| 2017 | San Diego Country Club | (United States) Sophia Schubert | 6 & 5 | (Switzerland) Albane Valenzuela |
| 2016 | Rolling Green Golf Club | (South Korea) Seong Eun-jeong | 1 up | (Italy) Virginia Elena Carta |
| 2015 | Portland Golf Club | (United States) Hannah O'Sullivan | 3 & 2 | (United States) Sierra Brooks |
| 2014 | Nassau Country Club | (United States) Kristen Gillman | 2 up | (Canada) Brooke Henderson |
| 2013 | Country Club of Charleston | (United States) Emma Talley | 2 & 1 | (China) Yueer Cindy Feng |
| 2012 | The Country Club (Cleveland) | (New Zealand) Lydia Ko | 3 & 1 | (United States) Jaye Marie Green |
| 2011 | Rhode Island Country Club | (United States) Danielle Kang (2) | 6 & 5 | (Thailand) Moriya Jutanugarn |
| 2010 | Charlotte Country Club | (United States) Danielle Kang | 2 & 1 | (United States) Jessica Korda |
| 2009 | Old Warson Country Club | (United States) (South Korea) Jennifer Song | 3 & 1 | (United States) Jennifer Johnson |
| 2008 | Eugene Country Club | (United States) Amanda Blumenherst | 2 & 1 | (Spain) Azahara Muñoz |
| 2007 | Crooked Stick Golf Club | (Colombia) Mariajo Uribe | 1 up | (United States) Amanda Blumenherst |
| 2006 | Pumpkin Ridge Golf Club | (United States) Kimberly Kim | 1 up | (Germany) Katharina Schallenberg |
| 2005 | Ansley Golf Club | (United States) Morgan Pressel | 9 & 8 | (Venezuela) Maru Martinez |
| 2004 | The Kahkwa Club | (United States) Jane Park | 2 up | (United States) Amanda McCurdy |
| 2003 | Philadelphia Country Club | (Thailand) Virada Nirapathpongporn | 2 & 1 | (United States) Jane Park |
| 2002 | Sleepy Hollow Country Club | (United States) Becky Lucidi | 3 & 2 | (United States) Brandi Jackson |
| 2001 | Flint Hills National Golf Club | (United States) Meredith Duncan | 37 holes | (Chile) Nicole Perrot |
| 2000 | Waverley Country Club | (United States) Marcy Newton | 8 & 7 | (United States) Laura Myerscough |
| 1999 | Biltmore Forest Country Club | (United States) Dorothy Delasin | 4 & 3 | (United States) Jimin Kang |
| 1998 | Barton Hills Country Club | (South Korea) Grace Park | 7 & 6 | (United States) Jenny Chuasiriporn |
| 1997 | Brae Burn Country Club | (Italy) Silvia Cavalleri | 5 & 4 | (United States) Robin Burke |
| 1996 | Firethorn Golf Club | (United States) Kelli Kuehne (2) | 2 & 1 | (Colombia) Marisa Baena |
| 1995 | The Country Club | (United States) Kelli Kuehne | 4 & 3 | (Australia) Anne-Marie Knight |
| 1994 | The Homestead | (United States) Wendy Ward | 2 up | (United States) Jill McGill |
| 1993 | San Diego Country Club | (United States) Jill McGill | 1 up | (United States) Sarah LeBrun Ingram |
| 1992 | Kemper Lakes Golf Club | (United States) Vicki Goetze (2) | 1 up | (Sweden) Annika Sörenstam |
| 1991 | Prairie Dunes Country Club | (United States) Amy Fruhwirth | 5 & 4 | (United States) Heidi Voorhees |
| 1990 | Canoe Brook Country Club | (United States) Pat Hurst | 37 holes | (United States) Stephanie Davis |
| 1989 | Pinehurst Resort | (United States) Vicki Goetze | 4 & 3 | (United States) Brandie Burton |
| 1988 | Minikahda Club | (United States) Pearl Sinn | 6 & 5 | (United States) Karen Noble |
| 1987 | Rhode Island Country Club | (United States) Kay Cockerill (2) | 3 & 2 | (United States) Tracy Kerdyk |
| 1986 | Pasatiempo Golf Club | (United States) Kay Cockerill | 9 & 7 | (United States) Kathleen McCarthy |
| 1985 | Fox Chapel Country Club | (Japan) Michiko Hattori | 5 & 4 | (United States) Cheryl Stacy |
| 1984 | Broadmoor Golf Club, Seattle | (United States) Deb Richard | 37 holes | (United States) Kimberly Williams |
| 1983 | Canoe Brook Country Club | (United States) Joanne Pacillo | 2 & 1 | (United States) Sally Quinlan |
| 1982 | Broadmoor Golf Club | (United States) Juli Inkster (3) | 4 & 3 | (United States) Cathy Hanlon |
| 1981 | Waverley Country Club | (United States) Juli Inkster (2) | 1 up | (Australia) Lindy Goggin |
| 1980 | Prairie Dunes Country Club | (United States) Juli Inkster | 2 up | (United States) Patti Rizzo |
| 1979 | Memphis Country Club | (United States) Carolyn Hill | 7 & 6 | (United States) Patty Sheehan |
| 1978 | Sunnybrook Golf Club | (Canada) Cathy Sherk | 4 & 3 | (United States) Judith Oliver |
| 1977 | Cincinnati Country Club | (United States) Beth Daniel (2) | 3 & 1 | (Canada) Cathy Sherk |
| 1976 | Del Paso Country Club | (United States) Donna Horton | 2 & 1 | (United States) Marianne Bretton |
| 1975 | Brae Burn Country Club | (United States) Beth Daniel | 3 & 2 | (United States) Donna Horton |
| 1974 | Broadmoor Golf Club, Seattle | (United States) Cynthia Hill | 5 & 4 | (United States) Carol Semple |
| 1973 | Montclair Golf Club | (United States) Carol Semple | 1 up | (United States) Anne Quast Sander |
| 1972 | St. Louis Country Club | (United States) Mary Budke | 5 & 4 | (United States) Cynthia Hill |
| 1971 | Atlanta Country Club | (United States) Laura Baugh | 1 up | (United States) Beth Barry |
| 1970 | Wee Burn Country Club | (United States) Martha Wilkinson | 3 & 2 | (United States) Cynthia Hill |
| 1969 | Las Colinas Country Club | (France) Catherine Lacoste | 3 & 2 | (United States) Shelley Hamlin |
| 1968 | Birmingham Country Club | (United States) JoAnne Gunderson (5) | 5 & 4 | (United States) Anne Quast Welts |
| 1967 | Annandale Golf Club | (United States) Mary Lou Dill | 5 & 4 | (United States) Jean Ashley |
| 1966 | Sewickley Heights Golf Club | (United States) JoAnne Gunderson (4) | 41 holes | (Canada) Marlene Stewart Streit |
| 1965 | Lakewood Country Club (Colorado) | (United States) Jean Ashley | 5 & 4 | (United States) Anne Quast Welts |
| 1964 | Prairie Dunes Country Club | (United States) Barbara McIntire (2) | 3 & 2 | (United States) JoAnne Gunderson |
| 1963 | Taconic Golf Club | (United States) Anne Quast Welts (3) | 2 & 1 | (United States) Peggy Conley |
| 1962 | Country Club of Rochester | (United States) JoAnne Gunderson (3) | 9 & 8 | (United States) Ann Baker |
| 1961 | Tacoma Country and Golf Club | (United States) Anne Quast Decker (2) | 14 & 13 | (United States) Phyllis Preuss |
| 1960 | Tulsa Country Club | (United States) JoAnne Gunderson (2) | 6 & 5 | (United States) Jean Ashley |
| 1959 | Congressional Country Club | (United States) Barbara McIntire | 4 & 3 | (United States) Joanne Goodwin |
| 1958 | Wee Burn Country Club | (United States) Anne Quast | 3 & 2 | (United States) Barbara Romack |
| 1957 | Del Paso Country Club | (United States) JoAnne Gunderson | 8 & 6 | (United States) Ann Casey Johnstone |
| 1956 | Meridian Hills Country Club | (Canada) Marlene Stewart | 2 & 1 | (United States) JoAnne Gunderson |
| 1955 | Myers Park Country Club | (United States) Patricia Lesser | 7 & 6 | (United States) Jane Nelson |
| 1954 | Allegheny Country Club | (United States) Barbara Romack | 4 & 2 | (United States) Mickey Wright |
| 1953 | Rhode Island Country Club | (United States) Mary Lena Faulk | 3 & 2 | (United States) Polly Riley |
| 1952 | Waverley Country Club | (United States) Jackie Pung | 2 & 1 | (United States) Shirley McFedters |
| 1951 | Town & Country Club | (United States) Dorothy Kirby | 2 & 1 | (United States) Claire Doran |
| 1950 | East Lake Golf Club | (United States) Beverly Hanson | 6 & 4 | (United States) Mae Murray |
| 1949 | Merion Golf Club | (United States) Dorothy Germain Porter | 3 & 2 | (United States) Dot Kielty |
| 1948 | Pebble Beach Golf Links | (United States) Grace Lenczyk | 4 & 3 | (United States) Helen Sigel |
| 1947 | Franklin Hills Country Club | (United States) Louise Suggs | 2 up | (United States) Dorothy Kirby |
| 1946 | Southern Hills Country Club | (United States) Babe Zaharias | 11 & 9 | (United States) Clara Sherman |
1942–45: No championships due to World War II
| 1941 | The Country Club | (United States) Betty Hicks Newell | 5 & 3 | (United States) Helen Sigel |
| 1940 | Pebble Beach Golf Links | (United States) Betty Jameson (2) | 6 & 5 | (United States) Jane S. Cothran |
| 1939 | Wee Burn Club | (United States) Betty Jameson | 3 & 2 | (United States) Dorothy Kirby |
| 1938 | Westmoreland Country Club | (United States) Patty Berg | 6 & 5 | (United States) Estelle Lawson Page |
| 1937 | Memphis Country Club | (United States) Estelle Lawson Page | 7 & 6 | (United States) Patty Berg |
| 1936 | Canoe Brook Country Club | (England) Pam Barton | 4 & 3 | (United States) Maureen Orcutt |
| 1935 | Interlachen Country Club | (United States) Glenna Collett-Vare (6) | 3 & 2 | (United States) Patty Berg |
| 1934 | Whitemarsh Valley Country Club | (United States) Virginia Van Wie (3) | 2 & 1 | (United States) Dorothy Traung |
| 1933 | Exmoor Country Club | (United States) Virginia Van Wie (2) | 4 & 3 | (United States) Helen Hicks |
| 1932 | Salem Country Club | (United States) Virginia Van Wie | 10 & 8 | (United States) Glenna Collett Vare |
| 1931 | Country Club of Buffalo | (United States) Helen Hicks | 2 & 1 | (United States) Glenna Collett-Vare |
| 1930 | Los Angeles Country Club | (United States) Glenna Collett (5) | 6 & 5 | (United States) Virginia Van Wie |
| 1929 | Oakland Hills Country Club | (United States) Glenna Collett (4) | 4 & 3 | (United States) Leona Pressler |
| 1928 | The Homestead | (United States) Glenna Collett (3) | 13 & 12 | (United States) Virginia Van Wie |
| 1927 | Cherry Valley Club | (United States) Miriam Burns Horn | 5 & 4 | (United States) Maureen Orcutt |
| 1926 | Merion Golf Club | (United States) Helen Stetson | 3 & 1 | (United States) Elizabeth Goss |
| 1925 | St. Louis Country Club | (United States) Glenna Collett (2) | 9 & 8 | (United States) Alexa Stirling |
| 1924 | Rhode Island Country Club | (Scotland) Dorothy Campbell (3) | 7 & 6 | (United States) Mary Browne |
| 1923 | Westchester Country Club | (United States) Edith Cummings | 3 & 2 | (United States) Alexa Stirling |
| 1922 | The Greenbrier | (United States) Glenna Collett | 5 & 4 | (England) Margaret Gavin |
| 1921 | Hollywood Golf Club | (United States) Marion Hollins | 5 & 4 | (United States) Alexa Stirling |
| 1920 | Mayfield Country Club | (United States) Alexa Stirling (3) | 5 & 4 | (Scotland) Dorothy Campbell |
| 1919 | Shawnee Country Club | (United States) Alexa Stirling (2) | 6 & 5 | (England) Margaret Gavin |
1917–18: No championships due to World War I
| 1916 | Belmont Springs Country Club | (United States) Alexa Stirling | 2 & 1 | (United States) Mildred Caverly |
| 1915 | Onwentsia Club | (United States) Florence Vanderbeck | 3 & 2 | (England) Margaret Gavin |
| 1914 | Nassau Country Club | (United States) Katherine Harley (2) | 1 up | (United States) Elaine Rosenthal |
| 1913 | Wilmington Country Club | (England) Gladys Ravenscroft | 2 up | (United States) Marion Hollins |
| 1912 | Essex County Country Club | (United States) Margaret Curtis (3) | 3 & 2 | (United States) Nonna Barlow |
| 1911 | Baltusrol Golf Club | (United States) Margaret Curtis (2) | 5 & 3 | (United States) Lillian B. Hyde |
| 1910 | Homewood Country Club | (Scotland) Dorothy Campbell (2) | 2 & 1 | (England) Mrs. F. M. Martin |
| 1909 | Merion Golf Club | (Scotland) Dorothy Campbell | 3 & 2 | (United States) Nonna Barlow |
| 1908 | Chevy Chase Club | (United States) Katherine Harley | 6 & 5 | (United States) Mrs. T. H. Polhemus |
| 1907 | Midlothian Country Club | (United States) Margaret Curtis | 7 & 6 | (United States) Harriot Curtis |
| 1906 | Brae Burn Country Club | (United States) Harriot Curtis | 2 & 1 | (United States) Mary B. Adams |
| 1905 | Morris County Golf Club | (United States) Pauline Mackay | 1 up | (United States) Margaret Curtis |
| 1904 | Merion Golf Club | (United States) Georgianna Bishop | 5 & 3 | (United States) Mrs. E. F. Sanford |
| 1903 | Chicago Golf Club | (United States) Bessie Anthony | 7 & 6 | (United States) J. Anna Carpenter |
| 1902 | The Country Club | (United States) Genevieve Hecker (2) | 4 & 3 | (United States) Louisa A. Wells |
| 1901 | Baltusrol Golf Club | (United States) Genevieve Hecker | 5 & 3 | (United States) Lucy Herron |
| 1900 | Shinnecock Hills Golf Club | (United States) Frances C. Griscom | 6 & 5 | (United States) Margaret Curtis |
| 1899 | Philadelphia Country Club | (United States) Ruth Underhill | 2 & 1 | (United States) Margaret Fox |
| 1898 | Ardsley Club | (United States) Beatrix Hoyt (3) | 5 & 3 | (United States) Maude Wetmore |
| 1897 | Essex County Club | (United States) Beatrix Hoyt (2) | 5 & 4 | (United States) Nellie Sargent |
| 1896 | Morris County Golf Club | (United States) Beatrix Hoyt | 2 & 1 | (United States) Mrs. Arthur Turnure |
| 1895 | Meadow Brook Club | (United States) Lucy Barnes Brown | 132 | (United States) Nellie Sargent |

=== Multiple winners ===
Nineteen players have won more than one U.S. Women's Amateur, through 2026:

- 6 wins: Glenna Collett-Vare
- 5 wins: JoAnne Gunderson Carner
- 3 wins: Beatrix Hoyt, Margaret Curtis, Dorothy Campbell, Alexa Stirling, Virginia Van Wie, Anne Quast, Juli Inkster
- 2 wins: Genevieve Hecker, Katherine Harley, Betty Jameson, Barbara McIntire, Beth Daniel, Kay Cockerill, Vicki Goetze, Kelli Kuehne, Danielle Kang, Kristen Gillman

Seven players have won both the U.S. Women's Amateur and Open Championships, through 2026:

- Patty Berg: 1938 Amateur; 1946 Open
- Betty Jameson: 1939, 1940 Amateurs; 1947 Open
- Babe Zaharias: 1946 Amateur; 1948, 1950, 1954 Opens
- Louise Suggs: 1947 Amateur; 1949, 1952 Opens
- Catherine Lacoste: 1969 Amateur; 1967 Open
- JoAnne Gunderson Carner: 1957, 1960, 1962, 1966, 1968 Amateurs; 1971, 1976 Opens
- Juli Inkster: 1980, 1981, 1982 Amateurs; 1999, 2002 Opens

Eleven players have won both the U.S. Women's and British Ladies Amateur Championships, through 2026:

- Dorothy Campbell:^ 1909, 1910, 1924 U.S.; 1909, 1911 British
- Gladys Ravenscroft: 1913 U.S.; 1912 British
- Pam Barton:^ 1936 U.S.; 1936, 1939 British
- Babe Zaharias: 1946 U.S.; 1947 British
- Louise Suggs: 1947 U.S.; 1948 British
- Marlene Stewart Streit: 1956 U.S.; 1953 British
- Barbara McIntire: 1959, 1964 U.S.; 1960 British
- Catherine Lacoste:^ 1969 U.S.; 1969 British
- Carol Semple Thompson: 1973 U.S.; 1974 British
- Anne Quast: 1958, 1961, 1963 U.S.; 1980 British
- Kelli Kuehne:^ 1996 U.S.; 1996 British

^ Won both in same year.

== Future sites ==
| Year | Edition | Course | Location | Dates | Previous championships hosted |
|---|---|---|---|---|---|
| 2027 | 127th | Pinehurst Resort, Course No. 2 | Pinehurst, North Carolina | August 2–8 | 1989 |
| 2028 | 128th | Brae Burn Country Club | West Newton, Massachusetts | August 7–13 | 1906, 1975, 1997 |
| 2029 | 129th | Oakland Hills Country Club | Bloomfield Hills, Michigan | August 6–12 | 1929 |
| 2030 | 130th | Olympic Club | San Francisco, California | August 5–11 | |
| 2031 | 131st | Baltimore Country Club, East Course at Five Farms | Baltimore, Maryland | August 4–10 | |
| 2032 | 132nd | Bandon Dunes Golf Resort | Bandon, Oregon | August 2–8 | 2025 |
| 2033 | 133rd | Erin Hills | Erin, Wisconsin | August 8–14 | |
| 2034 | 134th | The Country Club | Salt Lake City, Utah | August 7–13 | |
| 2035 | 135th | Atlanta Athletic Club | Johns Creek, Georgia | August 6–12 | |
| 2036 | 136th | Inverness Club | Toledo, Ohio | TBD | |
| 2037 | 137th | Country Club of North Carolina | Pinehurst, North Carolina | TBD | |
| 2038 | 138th | Saucon Valley Country Club | Bethlehem, Pennsylvania | TBD | |
| 2039 | 139th | Canterbury Golf Club | Beachwood, Ohio | TBD | |
| 2040 | 140th | Lancaster Country Club | Lancaster, Pennsylvania | TBD | |
| 2041 | 141st | Bandon Dunes Golf Resort | Bandon, Oregon | TBD | 2025, 2032 |
| 2044 | 144th | Pinehurst Resort, Course No. 2 | Pinehurst, North Carolina | TBD | 1989, 2027 |
| 2045 | 145th | Waverley Country Club | Portland, Oregon | TBD | |
| 2046 | 146th | Oakmont Country Club | Oakmont, Pennsylvania | TBD | |
