= Perry Adair =

American amateur golfer (1899–1953)

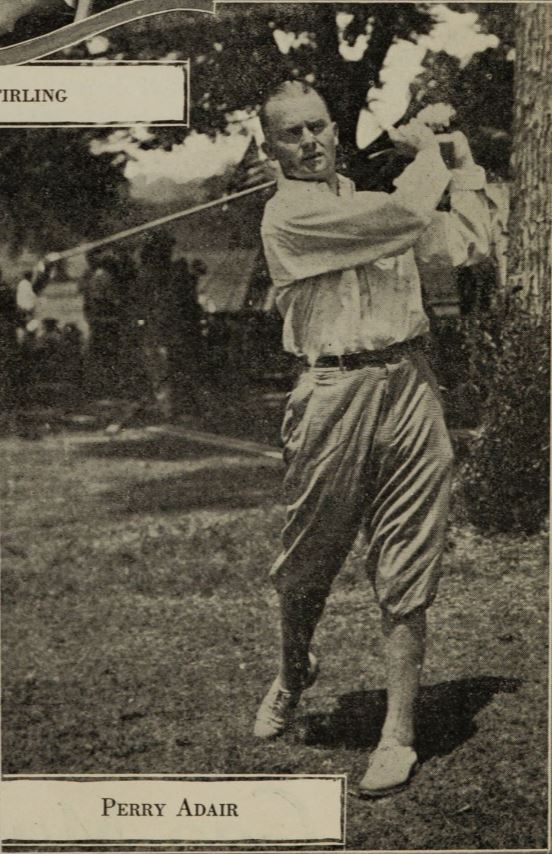
- Adair, c. 1921

Personal information
- Full name: Oliver Perry Adair
- Nationality: United States
- Born: 1899 Atlanta, Georgia, U.S. (presumably)
- Died: May 30, 1953 (aged 53–54) Atlanta, Georgia, U.S.

Career
- Sport: Golf
- Status: Amateur

Achievements and awards
- Georgia Tech Hall of Fame: 1973
- Georgia Golf Hall of Fame: 1989

Oliver Perry Adair (1899 – May 30, 1953) was an American amateur golfer from Atlanta, Georgia, who grew up playing golf at East Lake Golf Club with his friend Bobby Jones. He was a very accomplished player, having won the 1921 and 1923 Southern Amateur and 1922 Georgia Amateur championships.

Along with Jones and Alexa Stirling, he toured the country during World War I to raise funds for the Red Cross to assist in the war effort. Adair also played often with James Edgar and Willie Ogg in matches held at Druid Hills Golf Club and elsewhere in the Atlanta area.

== Golf career ==
During World War I, Adair and fellow golfers Bobby Jones and Alexa Stirling toured the country as "The Dixie Kids", playing golf in fundraisers to benefit the Red Cross. Adair won the 1914 East Lake Country Club Championship, the 1921 and 1923 Southern Amateur and 1922 Georgia Amateur.

His father, George W. Adair, Jr., was known as the father of golf in Atlanta and was instrumental in the building of East Lake Golf Club.

Adair was a member of the 1920 United States Olympic golf team. The event was cancelled from the Olympic program that year due to lack of funding.

== Death and legacy ==
Adair died on May 30, 1953. He is best known for his association with Bobby Jones and for winning the 1921 and 1923 Southern Amateur and 1922 Georgia Amateur championships.

He was inducted into the Georgia Tech Hall of Fame in 1973 and the Georgia Golf Hall of Fame in 1989.

== Amateur wins ==
Note: This list may be incomplete.

- 1921 Southern Amateur
- 1922 Georgia Amateur
- 1923 Southern Amateur
