= Glenna Collett-Vare =

American golfer (1903–1989)

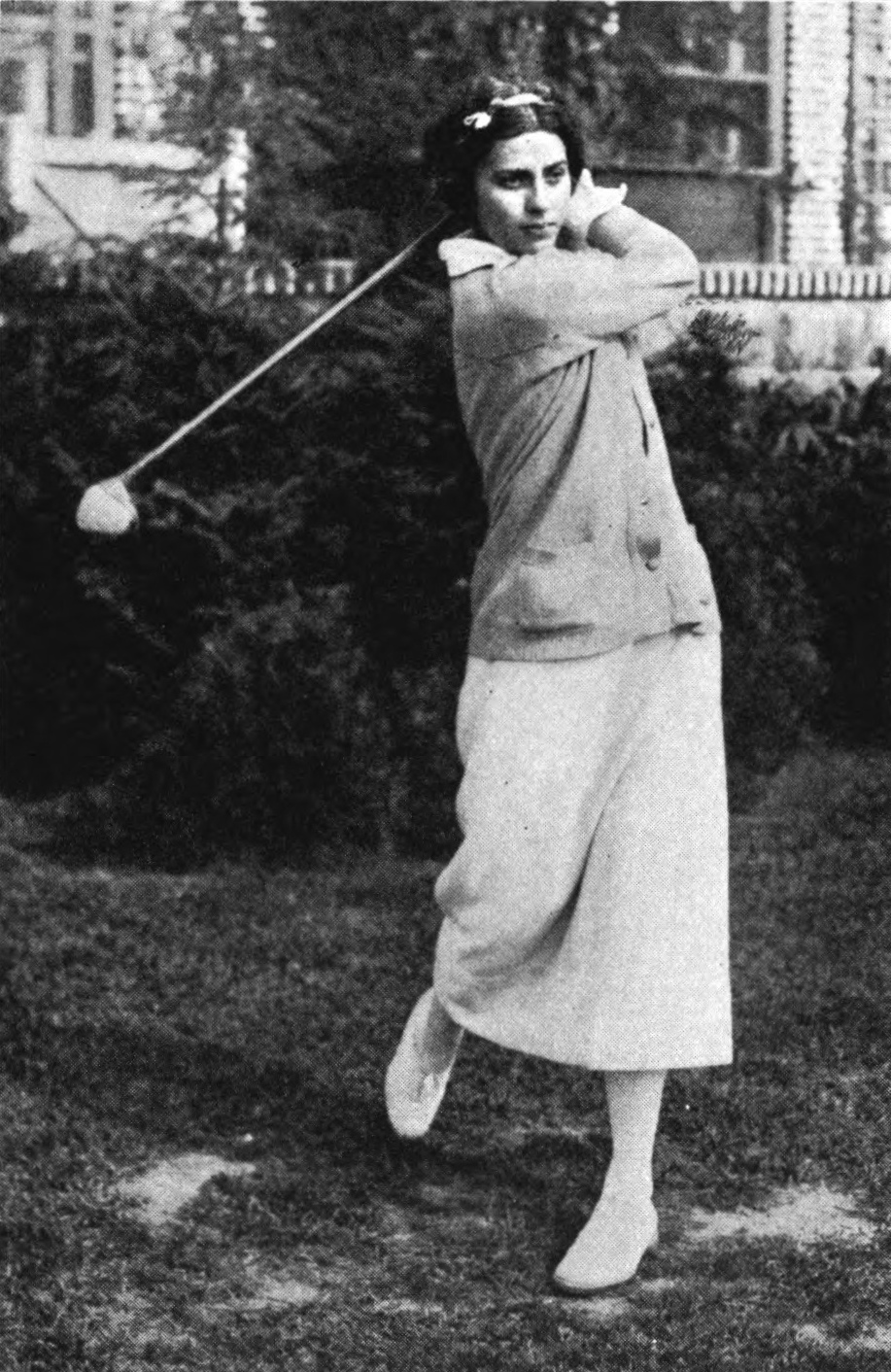

Personal information
- Nationality: United States
- Born: June 20, 1903 New Haven, Connecticut, U.S.
- Died: February 3, 1989 (aged 85) Gulf Stream, Florida, U.S.
- Spouse: Edwin H. Vare Jr. (m. 1931; died 1975)
- Children: 2

Career
- Sport: Golf
- Status: Amateur

Achievements and awards
- World Golf Hall of Fame: 1975 (member page)

Glenna Collett Vare (June 20, 1903 – February 3, 1989) was an American amateur golfer. She earned induction into the World Golf Hall of Fame. The Hall of Fame calls her the greatest female golfer of her day. Collett-Vare dominated American women's golf in the 1920s.

== Early life ==
Collett was born in New Haven, Connecticut in 1903. She was raised in Providence, Rhode Island by athletic-minded parents and at a young age was involved in sports such as swimming and diving.

At age 14, Collett took up the game of golf. Within two years she had developed her skills to the point where she competed in the 1919 U.S. Women's Amateur and won her first-round match. Two years later at age 18, she was the Championship medallist for shooting the lowest qualifying score.

== Golf career ==
In the pre-professional era, the U.S. Women's Amateur was the most prestigious event in the country. Her strength was off the tee. Collett was a student of golf instructor Ernest Jones.

While setting a new single-round scoring record in 1922, Glenna Collett claimed her first of six U.S. championships. The following year, she was upset in the third round but went north to win the Canadian Women's Amateur. In 1924, Glenna Collett achieved the most remarkable record in golfing history, both female and male.

Despite setting a new single-round qualifying scoring record, Collett lost by a fluke in the semifinal of the 1924 U.S. Women's Amateur when on the 19th hole, Mary Browne's ball caromed off hers and into the cup. However, that would be her only loss in a year where she won an astonishing 59 out of 60 matches, including her second consecutive Canadian championship.

Glenna Collett won the U.S. Women's Amateur again in 1925 and then reeled off three straight titles between 1928 and 1930. Between 1928 and 1931, she recorded 16 consecutive tournament victories. She won six North and South Women's Amateurs, six Women's Eastern Amateurs, and in between all this she was the runner-up in the 1929 and 1930 British Ladies Amateurs.

She also went to France, where she won the 1925 French Women's Amateur. In 1934, shortly after getting married and having children, she returned to golf, losing in the semi-finals to Virginia Van Wie. However, the following year, she won her sixth U.S. championship by defeating future star Patty Berg in the finals.

Collett-Vare would have a remarkable history at the Berthellyn Cup held annually since 1911 at the Huntingdon Valley Country Club, just north of Philadelphia. Considered as "second only to the National Amateur" in terms of prestige and strength of field, Collett-Vare would win the event a record six times: 1921, 1926, 1932, 1934, 1935, 1937.

Glenna Collett-Vare was a member of the American team that won the first Curtis Cup played at the Wentworth Golf Club in England in 1932. She served as player-captain in 1934, 1936, 1938, and 1948. After winning 49 championships, she ended her competitive golf career at the age of 56, with a victory at the 1959 Rhode Island Women's Golf Association tournament.

In her 1977 book, One Hundred Greatest Women in Sports, author Phyllis Hollander listed Glenna Collett Vare ahead of Babe Zaharias and Patty Berg, stating that "her career was unequaled in the annals of golf". Gene Sarazen called her "the greatest woman golfer of all time."

At the age of 81, she still had a 15 handicap and played in her 61st consecutive Invitational event in 1984 at the Point Judith Country Club in Rhode Island.

== Personal life ==
In the early 1930s, Collett-Vare married Edwin H. Vare Jr. and had two children.

Collett Vare died in 1989 in Gulf Stream, Florida. She is interred at West Laurel Hill Cemetery in Bala Cynwyd, Pennsylvania in the Edwin H. Vare family plot. She has no headstone.

== Awards and honors ==
- In 1949, Collett-Vare donated a lidded, twin-handled, sterling silver trophy to the United States Golf Association. The Glenna Collett Vare Trophy has been awarded to the winner of the U.S. Girls' Junior since that year.
- Since 1953, the Ladies Professional Golf Association has awarded the Vare Trophy to the golfer who has the lowest average strokes per round in professional tour events.
- In 1965, Collett was the recipient of the Bob Jones Award, the United States Golf Association's highest honor given in recognition of distinguished sportsmanship in golf.
- In 1975, she was inducted into the World Golf Hall of Fame.

== Amateur wins ==
- 1921 Berthellyn Cup
- 1922 U.S. Women's Amateur, North and South Women's Amateur, Eastern Women's Amateur
- 1923 Canadian Women's Amateur, North and South Women's Amateur, Eastern Women's Amateur
- 1924 Canadian Women's Amateur, North and South Women's Amateur, Eastern Women's Amateur
- 1925 U.S. Women's Amateur, French Women's Amateur
- 1926 Berthellyn Cup
- 1927 North and South Women's Amateur, Eastern Women's Amateur
- 1928 U.S. Women's Amateur
- 1929 U.S. Women's Amateur, North and South Women's Amateur
- 1930 U.S. Women's Amateur, North and South Women's Amateur
- 1932 Eastern Women's Amateur, Berthellyn Cup
- 1934 Berthellyn Cup
- 1935 U.S. Women's Amateur, Eastern Women's Amateur, Berthellyn Cup, Philadelphia Amateur
- 1937 Berthellyn Cup, Philadelphia Amateur
- 1938 Philadelphia Amateur
- 1959 Rhode Island Women's Golf Association tournament

== U.S. national team appearances ==
Amateur

- Curtis Cup: 1932 (winners), 1934 (non-playing captain), 1936 (tie, Cup retained, playing captain), 1938 (winners), 1948 (winners, playing captain), 1950 (non-playing captain)

== Bibliography ==
- Golf For Young Players by Glenna Collett (1926) – Little, Brown and Company
- Ladies in the Rough by Glenna Collett with a foreword by Bobby Jones (1928) – Alfred A. Knopf
