= Margaret Curtis =

American tennis player and golfer (1883–1965)

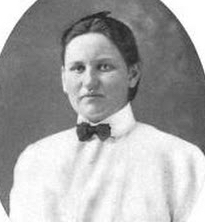
- Curtis in 1903

Personal information
- Full name: Margaret Curtis
- Nationality: United States
- Born: October 8, 1883 Manchester-by-the-Sea, Massachusetts, U.S.
- Died: December 24, 1965 (aged 82) Manchester-by-the-Sea, Massachusetts, U.S.
- Spouse: None

Career
- Sport: Golf
- College: Simmons College
- Status: Amateur

Achievements and awards
- Bob Jones Award: 1958
- Tennis career
- Country (sports): United States

Doubles
- Career titles: 1

Grand Slam doubles results
- US Open: W (1908)

Margaret Curtis (October 8, 1883 – December 24, 1965) was an American golf and tennis champion and lifelong social worker.

== Early life ==
From the Manchester-by-the-Sea, Massachusetts area, she was the youngest of ten children. Her father was a colonel in the Union Army cavalry during the American Civil War. Her brother James Freeman Curtis became a lawyer in New York City, and was the Assistant United States Secretary of the Treasury under President William Howard Taft.

Her cousin Laurence Curtis, who served as the second President of the United States Golf Association (USGA) in 1897–98, encouraged the family to take up the game of golf. As a result, Margaret and her sister Harriot Curtis began playing golf at a young age and as young ladies became members of the Women's Golf Association of Massachusetts. Founded in 1900, it was the first state women's golf association in the United States.

== Career ==
=== Sports ===
In 1897, 13-year-old Curtis qualified fourth in her first appearance at the U.S. Women's Amateur. In 1906, her sister Harriot won the Championship. Although health problems had prevented Margaret from competing for several years, she captured her first of three U.S. championships in 1907 by beating her sister in the finals. That year she played in England and in a stroke-play tournament at Walton Heath, near London, she was leading playing partner May Hezlet by five strokes going into the final hole. Curtis hit her drive into gorse bush, a very spiny and dense evergreen shrub common throughout western Europe but unfamiliar to an American. Curtis ended up taking a disastrous 13 on the hole to lose the tournament.

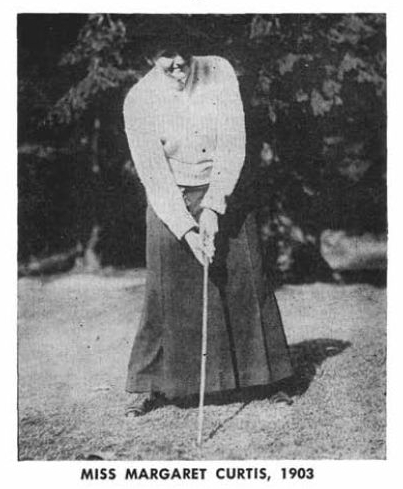

In 1908, she lost in the quarter-finals of the U.S. Championship to eventual winner Katherine Harley. In the 1911 U.S. Championship semi-finals she beat Dorothy Campbell, that year's Canadian Women's Amateur and British Ladies Amateur champion, then defeated Lillian B. Hyde in the championship match. Curtis made it back-to-back U.S. titles in 1912 when she also was the medalist for the sixth time.

Besides her skill at golf, Curtis was an excellent tennis player. In 1908 she won the U.S. Open doubles tennis championship with Evelyn Sears, becoming the only woman to simultaneously hold the U.S. golf and tennis titles.

In 1932, Curtis and her sister donated the Curtis Cup for a biennial golf competition between amateur teams representing the United States and Great Britain. She remained active in golf matters for most of her life. In December 1955, the Women's Golf Association of Massachusetts established a tournament in her and her sister's honor. The trophy, known as "The Curtis Bowl," is a replica of the Curtis Cup.

=== Social work ===
In 1904, Curtis was a student at Simmons College School of Social Work in Boston, training that would lead to her being a board member of the Family Service Society for 51 years.

With her career over in competitive golf, during World War I, she went to Paris, France where she joined the Red Cross, serving as the head of its Bureau for Refugees for three years. Her time in Paris marked the beginning of several more years spent in various places across Europe with the Red Cross.

== Personal life ==
Curtis died in 1965 at the age of 82.

== Awards and honors ==
In 1958, Curtis was the recipient of the Bob Jones Award, the highest honor given by the United States Golf Association (USGA) in recognition of distinguished sportsmanship in golf.

== Golf tournament wins ==
- 1901 Massachusetts Women's Amateur
- 1907 U.S. Women's Amateur, Massachusetts Women's Amateur
- 1908 Massachusetts Women's Amateur
- 1911 U.S. Women's Amateur
- 1912 U.S. Women's Amateur

== Tennis grand slam finals ==
=== Doubles (1 title) ===
Result	Year	Championship	Surface	Partner	Opponents	Score
Win	1908	U.S. National Championships	Grass	(United States) Evelyn Sears	(United States) Carrie Neely (United States) Miriam Steever	6–3, 5–7, 9–7
