= Katherine Harley =

American golfer

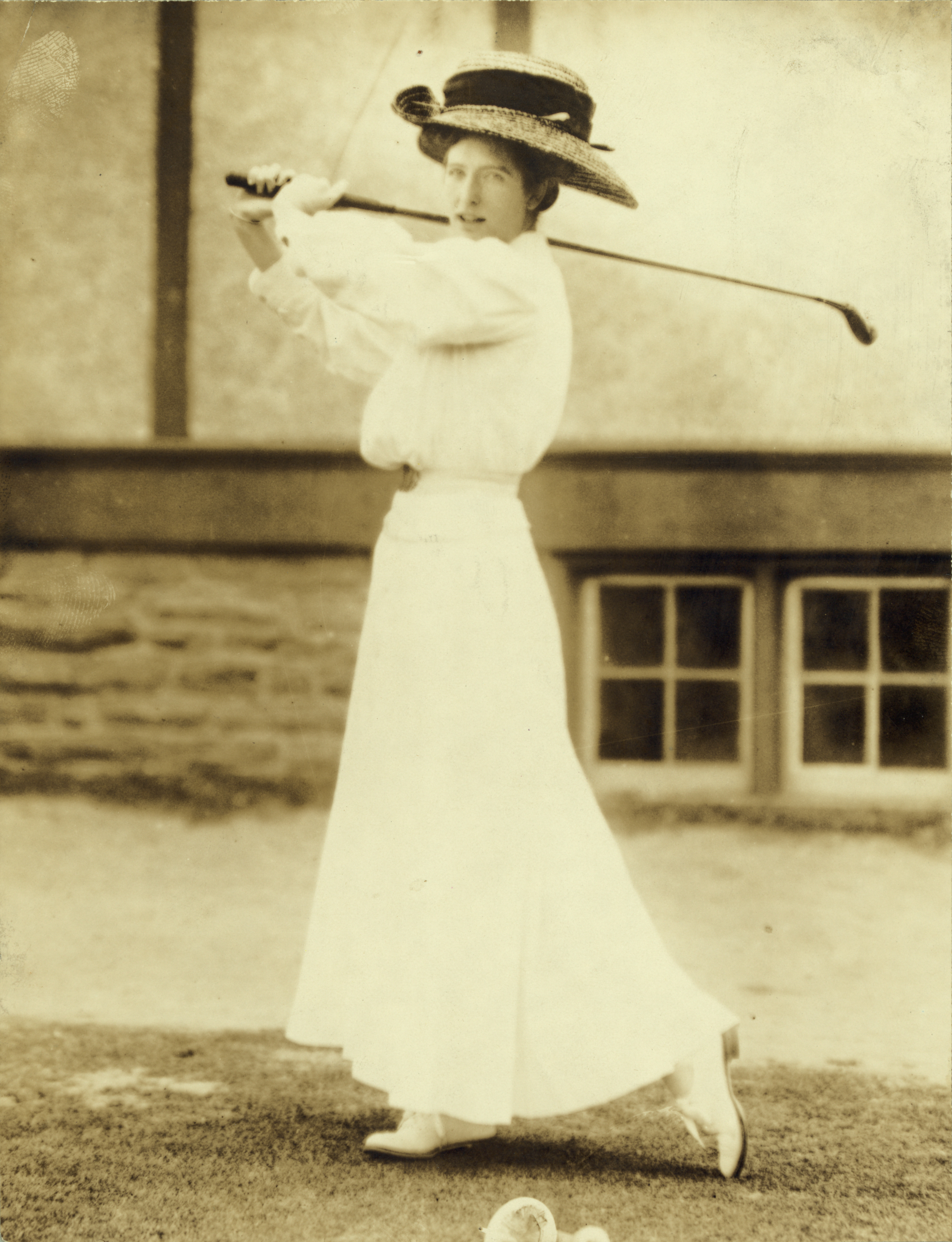
Katherine Harley in 1908

Katherine Harley, also known as Katharine Harley and Kate C. Harley, (November 13, 1881 – May 2, 1961) was an American amateur golfer.

Harley won the U.S. Women's Amateur of the United States Golf Association (USGA) in 1908. In 1914 she won the U.S. Women's Amateur again, as well as the Women's Eastern Championship. She also received the semi-final bronze medals of the USGA in 1903, 1904, and 1922.

In 1917 Harley was champion of the Women's Golf Association of Boston, and in 1921 she won the gold medal of the Women's Metropolitan Golf Association.

She married Herbert Arnold Jackson in 1913. She and her husband donated emergency service wings to two hospitals, as memorials to two sons.
