= East Lake, Atlanta =

Neighborhood of Atlanta, Georgia

Coordinates: 33.751205°N 84.301423°W

East Lake is a neighborhood on the east side of Atlanta, Georgia, situated in DeKalb County. It is the easternmost of the 238 neighborhoods in the City of Atlanta. It is home to East Lake Golf Club, the site of PGA's annual Tour Championship. East Lake lies mostly within the 30317 zip code.

== History ==
One of Atlanta's more historic neighborhoods, East Lake is located 4.5 miles (7.2 km) from downtown Atlanta. With its 1910 to 1940s bungalows and cottages and its convenience to local eateries, shops, and transit (MARTA), East Lake has enjoyed a rebirth in recent years.

East Lake is on part of a 19th-century plantation owned by Lt. Col. Robert Augustus Alston, whose home, known as Meadow Nook, still stands across from the East Lake Golf Course. This antebellum home was built in 1856 for his South Carolina bride, and was occupied during the American Civil War. It is the second-oldest home in the city of Atlanta and was not burned by Union General William T. Sherman and his troops.

In 1892, the East Lake Land Company was chartered and land was acquired and divided up into lots. A.C. Bruce was president of the East Lake Land Company and was instrumental in getting a street car line built down a right of way (now East Lake Drive), which started running cars every 20 minutes in 1893. This helped to increase the demand for the small cottage lots, many of which were bought by Atlantans, around the lake to escape the city during the summer months. By the recession of 1896 it became a failed development. The large covered pavilion and beach served as an amusement park, during the years up to 1900.

In 1899 Asa Candler, who was then building Coca-Cola into a national icon, started using agents to secretly buy up the land around the lake and surrounding area. The Atlanta Athletic Club (AAC) began looking for land to build a country location in 1902, and was stirred by one of Candler's agents to buy 280 acres (1.1 km^{2}). In 1904 the Atlanta Athletic Club opened East Lake Golf Club. A street line from Atlanta through Kirkwood, served the location. The Pavilion was removed in 1907 to make way for the first clubhouse. The first clubhouse and golf course were not completed til 1908. Golf was not the primary recreation at that time. Lawn bowling, tennis, boating and wading were all the craze. East Lake was incorporated as a town in 1908.

In 1912, an auto road was constructed from Ponce de Leon Avenue to the gates of East Lake Country Club, making East Lake even more accessible. By 1916, a $10,000 school building had been erected on Fourth Avenue, making East Lake the perfect suburban neighborhood. According to an Atlanta Journal-Constitution article in May, 1916, demand for East Lake homes was "almost to boom proportions." In 1928, East Lake was annexed into the City of Atlanta.

In 1926 Francis Marion Swanson moved to East Lake, and bought the home at 246 Daniel Avenue, across from what is now East Lake Park. Mr. Swanson was the treasurer of the East Lake Land Company, which helped spur development of the East Lake area by providing mortgages and construction loans to home buyers and builders. Mr. Swanson and friends encouraged sports enthusiasts to move to the area, many of whom had ties to Georgia Tech. The property site of the Swanson home also has the last of the remaining "Lake Cottages" that date back to the amusement park. This cottage was a guest house for the Swanson family, whose guests included notable Atlantans and Georgia Tech personalities such as football coaches Bill Alexander and Bobby Dodd, and renowned golfer Bobby Jones. Jones would come in for weekends, and drive onto the 9th fairway from Daniel Street to avoid the crowds.

During the early to mid twentieth century, the East Lake community thrived with life centered around the Athletic Club. The community had a swim team, tennis team, and football team as well as many accomplished golfers. Across Alston Drive from the Golf Course sat the Bachmann Farm, which kept the horses used for pulling the mowers at the Golf Course. In the early 1950s the land was donated to the City of Atlanta to be converted into what is now East Lake Park. The original Bachmann farm house was converted into a recreation center.

The AAC moved from Atlanta in 1966, selling both its East Lake and downtown Atlanta properties and purchasing its current site in northern Fulton County (now Johns Creek). A new club soon bought the property, establishing what is now known as East Lake Golf Club.

During the 1970s, a notorious public housing project, East Lake Meadows, was built at the former site of the second course at East Lake, west of Second Avenue. A violent crime wave took over the development, and the community saw crime rise, as quality of life and housing values declined. In 1995 a private group led by developer and former resident Tom Cousins entered into a partnership with the City of Atlanta to raze the Meadows and rebuild a new mixed income development, the Villages of East Lake. With the Meadows demolition, crime began to rapidly decline, and the community began a renaissance as the 20th century ended.

Sparked by an already active community association established in 1975, residents protected and preserved the neighborhood during the tumultuous 1960s, 70s, and 80s. As a result, in the late 1990s the neighborhood began to attract young urbanites who eagerly bought the charming homes and changed the residential character of the area, subjecting East Lake to a dramatic property value inflation of 230%.

In the 2005, the East Lake Neighbors Community Association adopted the East Lake Park in Partnership with Park Pride, completing the first community vision plan for a park with that organization. The goal of the parks group was to bring neighbors together in support of renovating the neglected park. That year, the Friends of East Lake Park received a $100,000 donation from Home Depot Foundation to build a new playground, shade structures, walking trails and benches, as well as extensive plantings throughout the park, and off site improvements at East Lake Elementary School and the Villages at East Lake. Over 800 volunteers from the community and corporate partners from Home Depot, Coca-Cola and UPS built all the improvements over a 6-hour period. Since then the Friends of East Lake Park has helped secure grant funding to renovate and restore the recreation center. The park is the pride of the community, with newly renovated tennis courts, and little league ball field, and is very active use most weekends.

In 2009, community members started the East Lake Farmers Market (ELFMarket) at the empty commercial intersection of 2nd Avenue and Hosea L. Williams Drive. The market started as a way to combat crime activity at the empty commercial intersection. The ELFMarket has evolved into 501(c)-3 not for profit charity that seeks to build community through food, hosting charity cook offs, offering reduced cost fresh produce, partnering in the community to try to improve health outcomes, and bringing together area neighbors Saturday mornings April through October each year. In 2012, the Market partnered with the Southeastern Horticultural Society to build a raised bed urban farm at the former site of a gas station.

Several months per year, a "Yard of the Month" award is placed on a home's lawn. Yards are nominated and voted for by, previous award winners.

== Geography ==
East Lake is bordered by:

- Knox St./Pharr Rd. and the Decatur neighborhood of Oakhurst to the north;
- 1st St. and the Atlanta neighborhood of Kirkwood to the west; also, the Villages at East Lake on the west side of East Lake are a separate neighborhood;
- Candler Road and the Belvedere Park CDP in unincorporated DeKalb County to the east and
- Glenwood Ave. and the Candler McAfee CDP in unincorporated DeKalb County to the south.

== Notable people ==
Many notable people have played roles in East Lake's history, including Asa Candler, golfers Bobby Jones and Alexa Stirling, and Johnny Weissmuller, winner of 5 Olympic gold medals and the first movie Tarzan, who swam at East Lake. Accomplished amateur golfers Watts Gunn, Charlie Yates, and Tommy Barnes have been residents, along with Georgia Tech coaches William Alexander and Bobby Dodd. Civil rights activist Hosea Williams was a resident of East Lake, serving the community as an Atlanta City Council member, state representative and state senator.

East Lake boasts some impactful musical residents. Vocal group, The Tams, met & practiced in East Lake in the 10960s. They are best known for their 1968 hit recording of Be Young, Be Foolish, Be Happy. Destiny's Child member Kelly Rowland spent her early childhood in East Lake before relocating to Houston.

Community activist Eva Davis was among the earliest residents of the notorious East Lake Meadows housing project when she moved in with her children shortly after it opened in 1971. She was elected president of its tenants association and she led rent strikes against the Atlanta Housing Authority (AHA) to win improvements such as better outdoor lighting, more sidewalks and a day care center. Davis persevered in her mission of community upgrade even as dope dealers turned the housing project into a war zone with the infamous nickname of "Little Vietnam."

== Golf ==
East Lake is home to two golf courses. The East Lake Golf Club, the home course of golf legend Bobby Jones, is the site of PGA's annual Tour Championship. It was reconstructed in 1995 by noted golf course architect Rees Jones.

The Charlie Yates Golf Course is adjacent to the East Lake Golf Club and is open to the public. It was designed by Rees Jones in 1998.

== Education ==
East Lake residents are zoned to Atlanta Public Schools (APS).

All area residents are zoned to Toomer Elementary School, in neighboring Kirkwood, Martin Luther King Jr Middle School, and Maynard H. Jackson High School.

Charles R. Drew Charter School is a local APS-affiliated charter school. Children of East Lake residents are given first opportunity to enroll at Drew.
