= Bobby Jones: Stroke of Genius =

- Theatrical release poster
- Directed by: Rowdy Herrington
- Screenplay by: Rowdy Herrington; Bill Pryor; Tony De Paul
- Story by: Rowdy Herrington; Kim Dawson
- Produced by: Kim Dawson
- Starring: Jim Caviezel; Claire Forlani; Jeremy Northam; Malcolm McDowell; Aidan Quinn
- Cinematography: Tom Stern
- Edited by: Pasquale Buba
- Music by: James Horner
- Production company: McDongall Films
- Distributed by: Film Foundry Releasing
- Release date: April 30, 2004
- Running time: 123 minutes
- Country: United States
- Language: English
- Budget: $20 million
- Box office: $2,707,913

Bobby Jones: Stroke of Genius is a 2004 biographical sports drama film directed and co-written by Rowdy Herrington. The film is based on the life of golfer Bobby Jones, the only player in the sport to win all four of the men's major golf championships in a single season (1930, an era when the majors were The Amateur Championship in Britain, the U.S. Amateur, The Open Championship, and the U.S. Open). The film was the first motion picture concerning The Royal and Ancient Golf Club of St Andrews that was given permission to film on location..

== Plot ==
In 1936, golfer Bobby Jones, while traveling to the Olympics in Berlin, makes a stop in Scotland to visit the Old Course at St. Andrews. Anxious about his reception, he is warmly welcomed by many spectators, some of whom have closed their local shops for the day to watch him play.

The scene changes to Atlanta, Georgia, where Jones, a young boy, observes his father "Colonel" Jones playing golf, poorly. The more young Bobby watches, the more he emulates the better players he sees, such as Stewart Maiden, a club professional originally from Scotland. By the time he is 14, Jones wins the 1916 Georgia State Amateur Championship and makes the quarterfinals of the U.S. Amateur that same year. Notable sportswriters of the era such as O.B. Keeler and Grantland Rice take a keen interest in him.

With World War I coming to an end, Jones participates in war-relief matches with several famous golfers such as the colorful Walter Hagen, who eventually becomes Bobby's chief rival on the course. He also attends Georgia Tech, where he receives a diploma and meets Mary Malone, whom he ultimately marries. Despite his great skill as a golfer, he also has a hot temper that affects his game and reputation. His first time at St. Andrews, in 1921, Jones walks off the course after 11 holes of the third round, expressing his dislike for the course. His idol Harry Vardon, who would win The Open Championship a record six times during his career, cautions Bobby never to quit, particularly at St. Andrews, which he considers the greatest golf course of all.

In 1923, Jones finally overcomes his temper troubles and wins his first major championship at the U.S. Open, defeating Bobby Cruickshank in a playoff. In the following years, great success follows as Bobby wins 2 more U.S. Opens, 4 U.S. Amateurs, and 2 Open Championships through 1929. During that timeframe, Jones attends Harvard College and later Emory University School of Law, becoming a lawyer by profession (which was his grandfather's wish), never turning professional as a golfer. By 1930, Jones begins to lose interest in tournament golf. He tells Mary his final goal is to win all 4 majors in the same year and will then retire. That year, Jones accomplishes that goal, becoming the first and still only golfer to win the calendar Grand Slam. Soon after, Bobby keeps his word and he shocks the sports world by retiring from tournament golf at only 28 years old.

A title card reveals that after retirement, Jones would continue to make contributions to the game of golf such as founding the Augusta National Golf Club and The Masters. He served in the United States Air Force during World War II. In 1948, Jones was diagnosed with syringomyelia which crippled him for the rest of his life until his death in 1971.

== Cast ==
- Jim Caviezel – Robert Tyre "Bobby" Jones, Jr.
  - Devon Gearhart – young Bobby
  - Bubba Lewis – teenage Bobby
- Claire Forlani – Mary Malone Jones
- Jeremy Northam – Walter Hagen
- Malcolm McDowell – O.B. Keeler
- Aidan Quinn – Harry Vardon
- Brett Rice – Big Bob Jones
- Connie Ray – Clara Jones
- Dan Albright – Grandfather Jones
- Paul Freeman – Angus
- Alistair Begg – Stewart Maiden
- Hilton McRae – Jimmy Maiden
- Elizabeth Omilami – Camilla
- Brian F. Durkin – Perry Adair
- John Shepherd – Bob Woodruff
- Happy Lashelle – Nell Woodruff
- Allen O'Reilly – Grantland Rice
- Robert Pralgo – Reporter
- Wilbur Fitzgerald – Megaphone Golf Official
- Matt Lanter – Bobby Jones's Caddy
- Ian Birse – The Monobrow

== Production ==
The film was shot in multiple locations, including Southern California, Georgia: Agnes Scott College, Decatur, GA, East Lake Golf Club, Castleberry Hill, Covington, Griffin; and Scotland and St. Andrews, Fife. This film marks the film debut of Matt Lanter.

== Release ==
=== Box office ===
The film was a commercial failure, with an opening weekend gross of $1.2 million and $2,707,913 overall, against a production cost of $20 million.

=== Critical response ===
The film received negative reviews. It has a 27% approval rating on the review aggregator website Rotten Tomatoes, based on 74 reviews. The website's consensus reads, "This earnest, monotonous biopic lacks dramatic tension and simplifies Jones' life." On Metacritic, which uses an average of critics' reviews, the film has a 45 out of 100 rating, based on 28 reviews, indicating "mixed or average" reviews.
