= Tom Cousins =

American sports businessman (1931–2025)

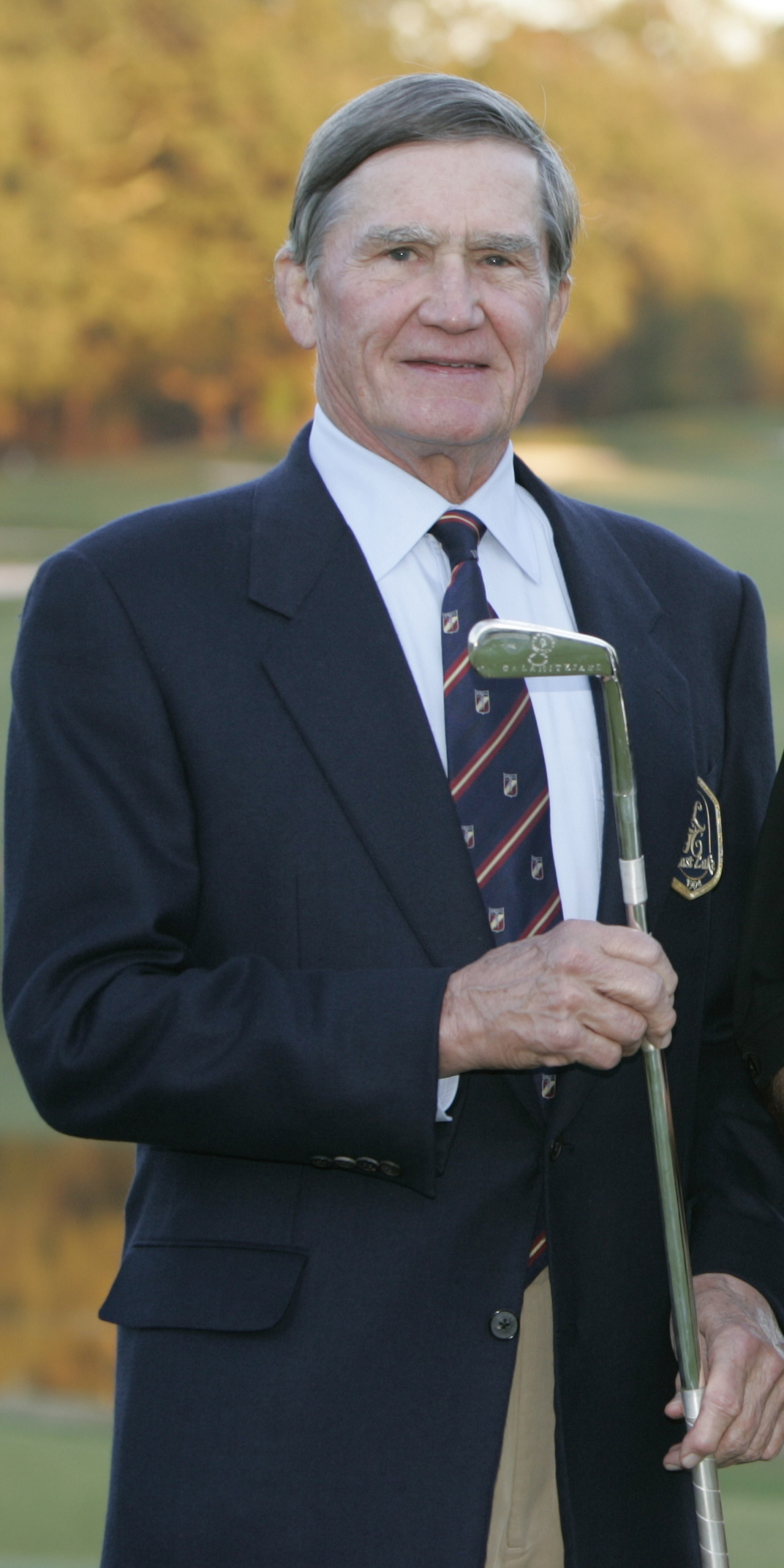
- Cousins in 2004
- Born: December 7, 1931; Atlanta, Georgia, U.S.
- Died: July 29, 2025 (aged 93); Atlanta, Georgia, U.S.
- Education: University of Georgia
- Occupations: Real estate developer, philanthropist, sports supporter
- Known for: Owning the Atlanta Hawks and Atlanta Flames
- Spouse: Ann Cousins
- Children: 2

Thomas Grady Cousins (December 7, 1931 – July 29, 2025) was an American real estate developer, sports supporter and philanthropist, primarily based in Atlanta, Georgia. Cousins was a leader in shaping the skyline in Atlanta, and he purchased and brought the Atlanta Hawks to the city.

Cousins was also known for his community redevelopment and his desire to help local neighborhoods. In 1995, he purchased the historic East Lake Golf Club with the intent that its profits would go back to help the local East Lake community. Cousins' model of community redevelopment is now being implemented in cities all over the country through a program he founded to replicate the East Lake model called Purpose Built Communities.

== Commercial career ==
Cousins graduated with a Bachelor of Business Administration (BBA) in 1952 from the Terry College of Business at The University of Georgia in Athens. He and his father started their real-estate company in 1958. During the 1960s, Tom Cousins moved from real-estate to property development and sports franchising.

He developed buildings such as the CNN Center, the Omni Coliseum, 191 Peachtree Tower, the Pinnacle Building in Buckhead and the first phase of the Georgia World Congress Center. He and competitor John Portman completely remade downtown Atlanta in the 1970s and 1980s.

He also helped revive and redesign the home course of golfing great Bobby Jones, East Lake Golf Club, which had fallen into disrepair. He hired Rees Jones (the son of legendary golf course designer Robert Trent Jones) to redesign the golf course, which has since hosted the PGA Tour's season ending Tour Championship several times, and become one of the leading golf courses in Atlanta. Cousins and his family financed the project to the tune of about $25 million. This was part of a greater revitalization of the East Lake Meadows housing project in the East Lake neighborhood around the golf course.

He retained air rights over the CNN Center parking deck in Atlanta's massive railroad gulch.

He stepped down as head of Cousins Properties in January 2002.

== Philanthropic works ==
In 1995 Cousins founded the East Lake Foundation in Atlanta. The Foundation partnered with the Atlanta Housing Authority to build a mixed-income apartment block in a local low-income area with a high crime rate and put additional resources into education options and job provision for the tenants. Columnist Leonard Pitts Jnr. noted that these changes saw "violent crime down 96 percent" and "78 percent of kids passing the state math test when only 5 percent could do it before".

Based on the results of the East Lake Foundation project, Cousins, with partner Warren Buffett, created Purpose Built Communities, an organization focused on supporting other communities working to replicate the successful community development seen in Atlanta. Purpose Built Communities partners with many communities across the United States.

== Sports franchises ==
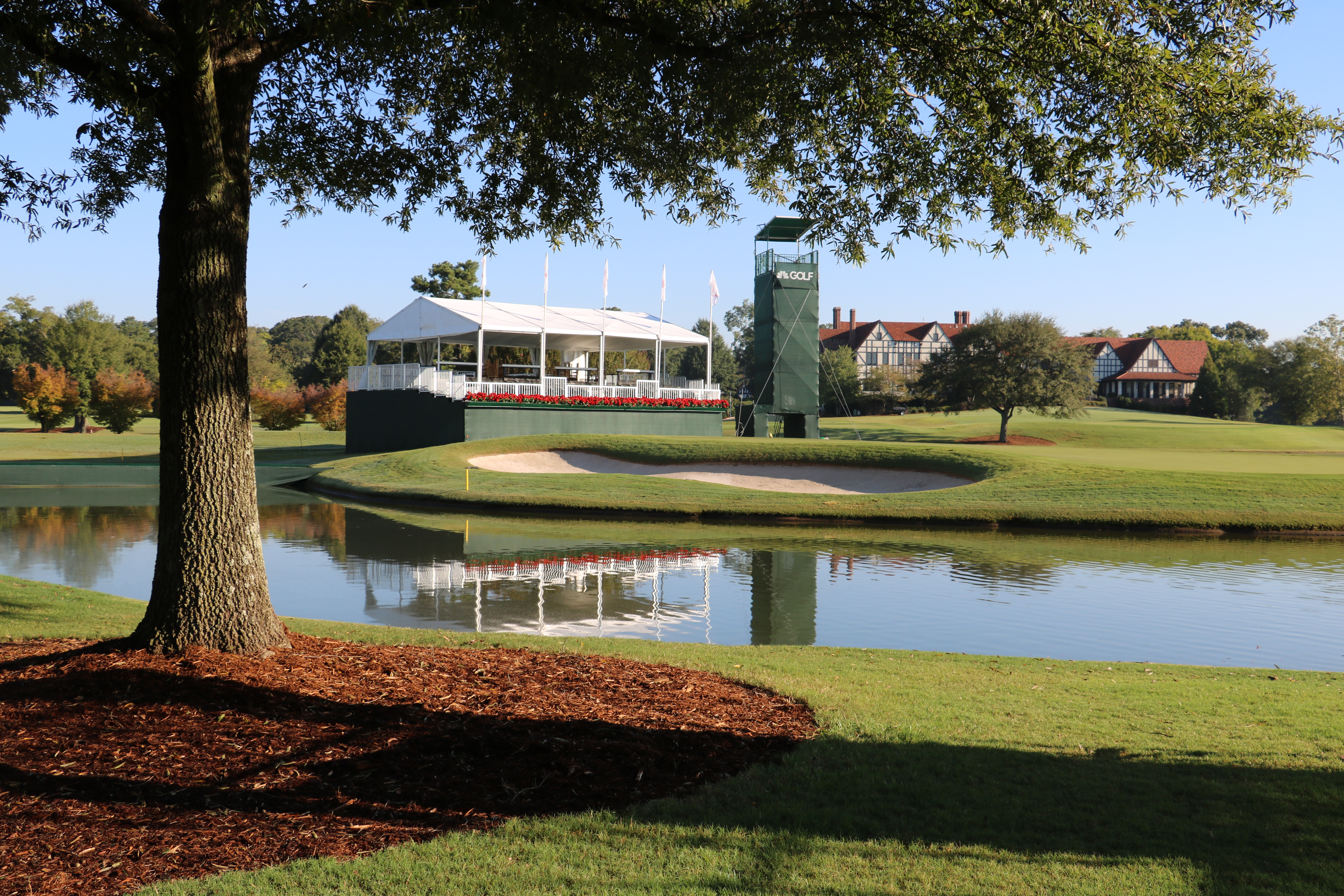
Cousins helped to restore East Lake Golf Club which is now the permanent home of the Tour Championship

In April 1968, Cousins purchased the NBA's St. Louis Hawks basketball team and moved them to Atlanta. At the time Atlanta did not have a major-league caliber arena, but Cousins was building a local arena complex. Cousins also owned the Atlanta Flames until he sold them in 1980 for approximately $16 million to a consortium from Calgary. He purchased the original Atlanta Chiefs soccer club of the North American Soccer League from the Braves in 1973, during this time they were renamed the Atlanta Apollos.

In 1993 Tom Cousins was the recipient of the Bill Hartman Award which recognises former varsity athletes from the University of Georgia who have demonstrated excellence in their profession. On March 8, 2010, Cousins was awarded the Lifetime Achievement Award at the 2010 Atlanta Sports Awards for his role in promoting sports in Atlanta.

In 1995 Cousins purchased East Lake Golf Club and restored it to its former glory. He also helped to establish East Lake as the permanent home of the TOUR Championship which is the season-ending tournament for the PGA TOUR. Profits from East Lake Golf Club go to the East Lake Foundation which in turn goes to help the East Lake Community.

== Death ==
Cousins died in Atlanta on July 29, 2025, at the age of 93.

== Awards and honors ==
- 2015 Philanthropist of the Year by the Association of Fundraising Professionals Greater Atlanta Chapter.
- 2012 Georgia Trustee. Given by the Georgia Historical Society, in conjunction with the Governor of Georgia, to individuals whose accomplishments and community service reflect the ideals of the founding body of Trustees, which governed the Georgia colony from 1732 to 1752.
- 2008 Four Pillar Tribute Honoree by the Council for Quality Growth
- 2007 honorary degree in Doctor of Humane Letters from Oglethorpe University

Sporting positions
Preceded by Ben Kerner as St. Louis Hawks	Atlanta Hawks owner 1968–1977	Succeeded by Ted Turner
New creation	Atlanta Flames owner 1971–1980	Succeeded by Nelson Skalbania as Calgary Flames
