= Purpose Built Communities =

Non profit organization

- Formation: 2009
- Founder: Tom Cousins, Warren Buffett, and Julian Robertson
- Legal status: Non Profit
- Headquarters: Atlanta, Georgia, United States
- Region served: United States of America
- Website: http://purposebuiltcommunities.org

Purpose Built Communities is a non profit organization founded by Tom Cousins, Warren Buffett, and Julian Robertson to replicate Cousin's East Lake model of community redevelopment within other cities and areas throughout the United States. As of 2021, Purpose Built Communities is present in 15 states throughout the United States.

== History ==
Purpose Built Communities is based on the East Lake Model. In 1995, Tom Cousins purchased historic East Lake Golf Club in Atlanta, Georgia with the intent to restore it and give its profits to the East Lake Foundation, a foundation he established to help fight poverty within the East Lake Community. At the time, East Lake was known as "little Vietnam' by local police because of its high drug and crime rates. Through the East Lake initiative, Cousins helped turn one of the nation's most violent public housing projects into a national model for community redevelopment.

In 2009, Cousins sought to expand the East Lake Model and established Purpose Built Communities to help fight other areas of concentrated poverty throughout the United States.

== Communities ==
The following are some communities that Purpose Built Communities has a presence in:

- Atlanta, Georgia - East Lake
- Birmingham, Alabama - Woodlawn United
- Charlotte, North Carolina - Renaissance West
- Columbus, Ohio - PACT
- Fort Worth, Texas - Renaissance Heights
- Houston, Texas - CONNECT
- Indianapolis, Indiana - Avondale Meadows
- New Orleans, Louisiana - Bayou District
- Oakland, California - Castlemont
- Orlando, Florida - LIFT Orlando
- Omaha, Nebraska - Seventy Five North
- Raleigh, North Carolina - Beacon
- Rome, Georgia - South Rome Redevelopment
- Spartanburg, South Carolina - Northside Initiative
- Wilmington, Delaware - Riverside–11th Street Bridge

== Purpose Built Schools ==
Based on the model of Drew Charter Schools established by the East Lake Foundation, Purpose Built Schools is a segment of Purpose Built Communities which works to break the cycle of poverty in communities by establishing high performing schools.
