= Atlanta Athletic Club =

Country club in Georgia, United States

Coordinates: 34°00′14.40″N 84°11′34.96″W

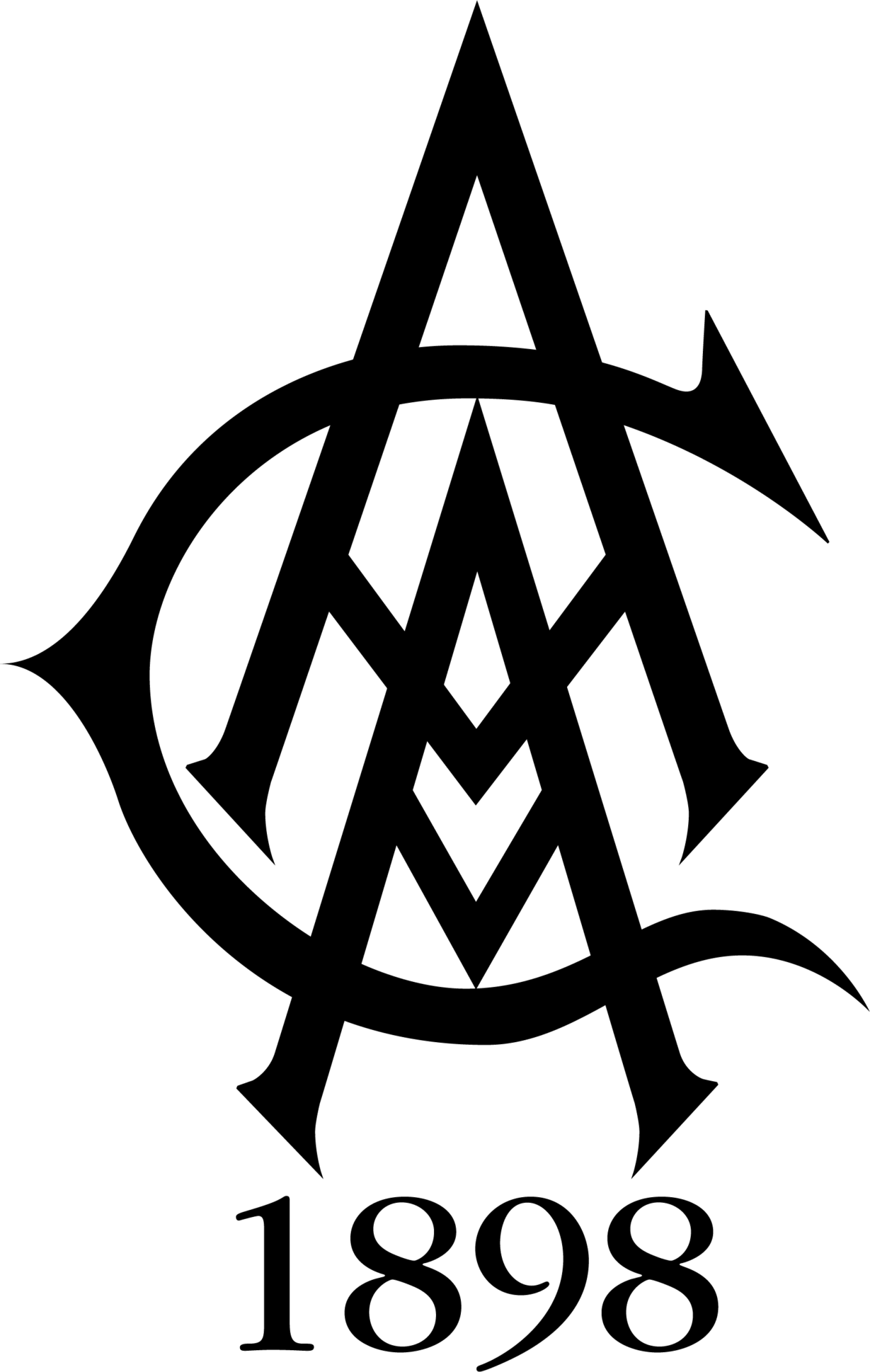
- Interactive map of Atlanta Athletic Club

Club information
- Location: Johns Creek, Georgia, U.S.
- Established: 1898 (1904 for golf course)
- Type: Private
- Total holes: 45
- Tournaments: U.S. Open (1976); PGA Championship (1981, 2001, 2011); U.S. Women's Open (1990); U.S. Amateur (2014); Women's PGA Championship (2021)
- Website: atlantaathleticclub.org

Highlands Course
- Designed by: Robert Trent Jones, back 9 Joe Lee, front 9 Rees Jones (2006 & 2016 redesigned)
- Par: 72
- Length: 7,613 yards (6,961 m)
- Course rating: 77.0

Riverside Course
- Designed by: Robert Trent Jones; Rees Jones (2003 redesign); Tripp Davis (2022 redesigned)
- Par: 71
- Length: 7,152 yards (6,540 m)
- Course rating: 76.2

Par 3 Course
- Par: 27
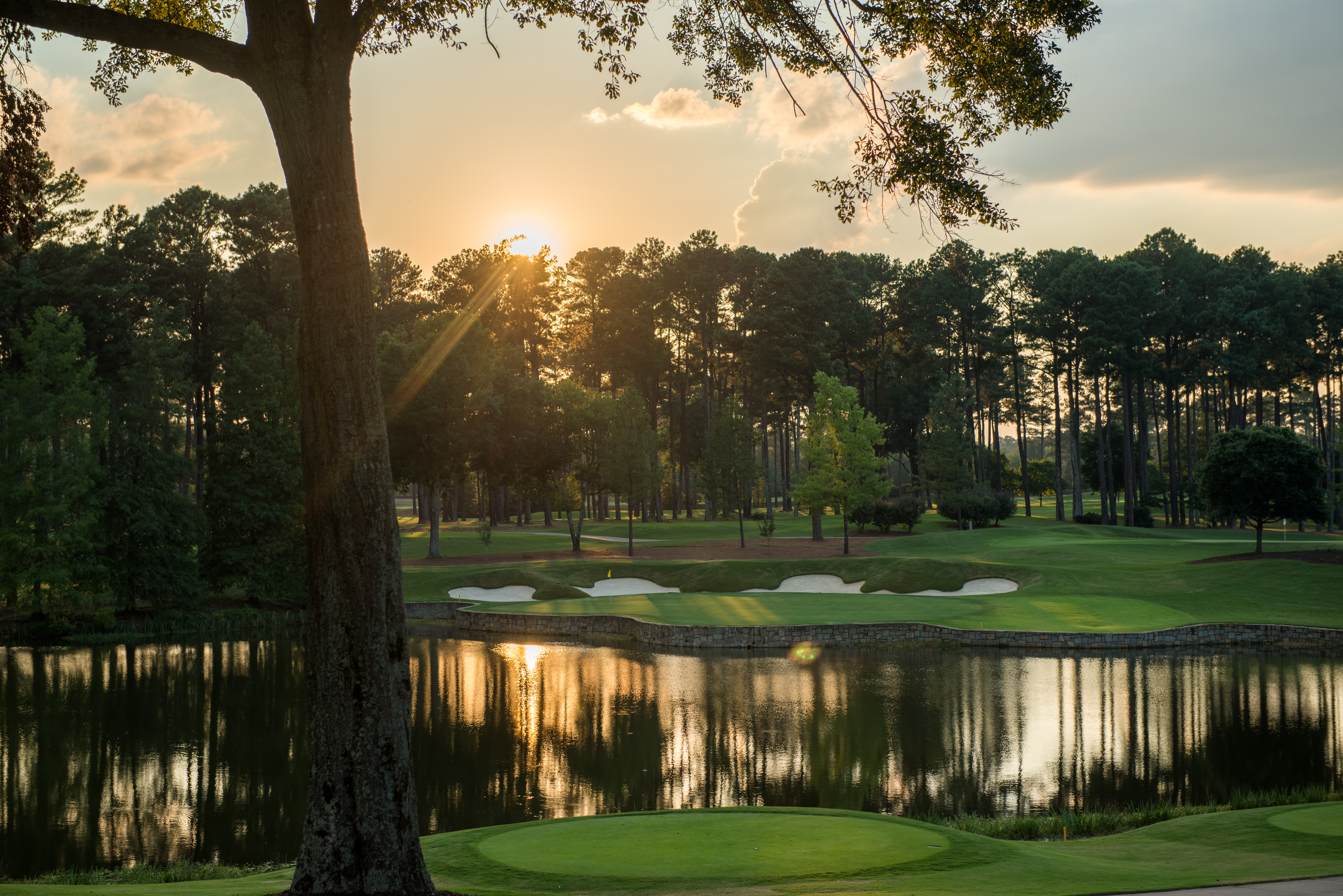
- The Atlanta Athletic Club in 2017.

Atlanta Athletic Club (AAC), founded in 1898, is a private country club in Johns Creek, Georgia, a suburb 23 miles north of Atlanta. The original home of the club was a 10-story building located on Carnegie Way, and in 1904 a golf course was built on its East Lake property. In 1908, John Heisman (the Georgia Tech football coach for whom the Heisman Trophy was named) was hired as the AAC athletic director.

While it was downtown, its team placed third in the 1921 Amateur Athletic Union National Basketball Championship defeating Lowe and Campbell Athletic Goods 36–31 in the third place game. At the time colleges, athletic clubs, and factory-sponsored clubs all competed in the same league.

It built 3 9-hole golf courses in 1967, in a then-unincorporated area of Fulton County that had a Duluth mailing address and would eventually become Johns Creek in 2006. In 1968, the AAC sold the East Lake property. The vacated East Lake site became East Lake Golf Club and was refurbished during the 1990s. It is now the home of The Tour Championship, the annual final event of the PGA Tour.

AAC hosted the 1950 U.S. Women's Amateur and 1963 Ryder Cup at East Lake, the 1976 U.S. Open, the 1981, 2001 and 2011 PGA Championships, and the 2021 KPMG PGA Women's Championship on its Highlands Course, and the 1990 U.S. Women's Open on its Riverside Course. The AAC used both of its current regulation courses to host the 2014 U.S. Amateur, with stroke-play qualifying on the Riverside and Highlands Courses and match play on the Highlands Course. The Riverside course, renovated by Rees Jones in 2002, was recognized among the top 10 new private courses in 2004 by Golf Digest. It was renovated again in 2022 by Tripp Davis.

AAC has hosted many non-golf events including the first two Southeastern Conference men's basketball tournaments in 1933 and 1934. In 1984 and 1985, AAC hosted the U.S. Open Badminton Championship. During the 1990s, AAC hosted the AT&T Challenge, Atlanta's ATP professional tennis stop.

AAC has two 18-hole golf courses, a fitness center, indoor and outdoor tennis, a par-3 course, Olympic-sized pool, as well as dining.

Famous members of AAC include golfers Bobby Jones, Charlie Yates, Alexa Stirling, Watts Gunn, Dot Kirby, and Tommy Barnes; tennis players Nat Thornton and Bitsy Grant; and basketball player Bob Kurland.

In the 2004 film Bobby Jones: Stroke of Genius, many of the golf scenes were filmed at AAC.

== Pictures ==
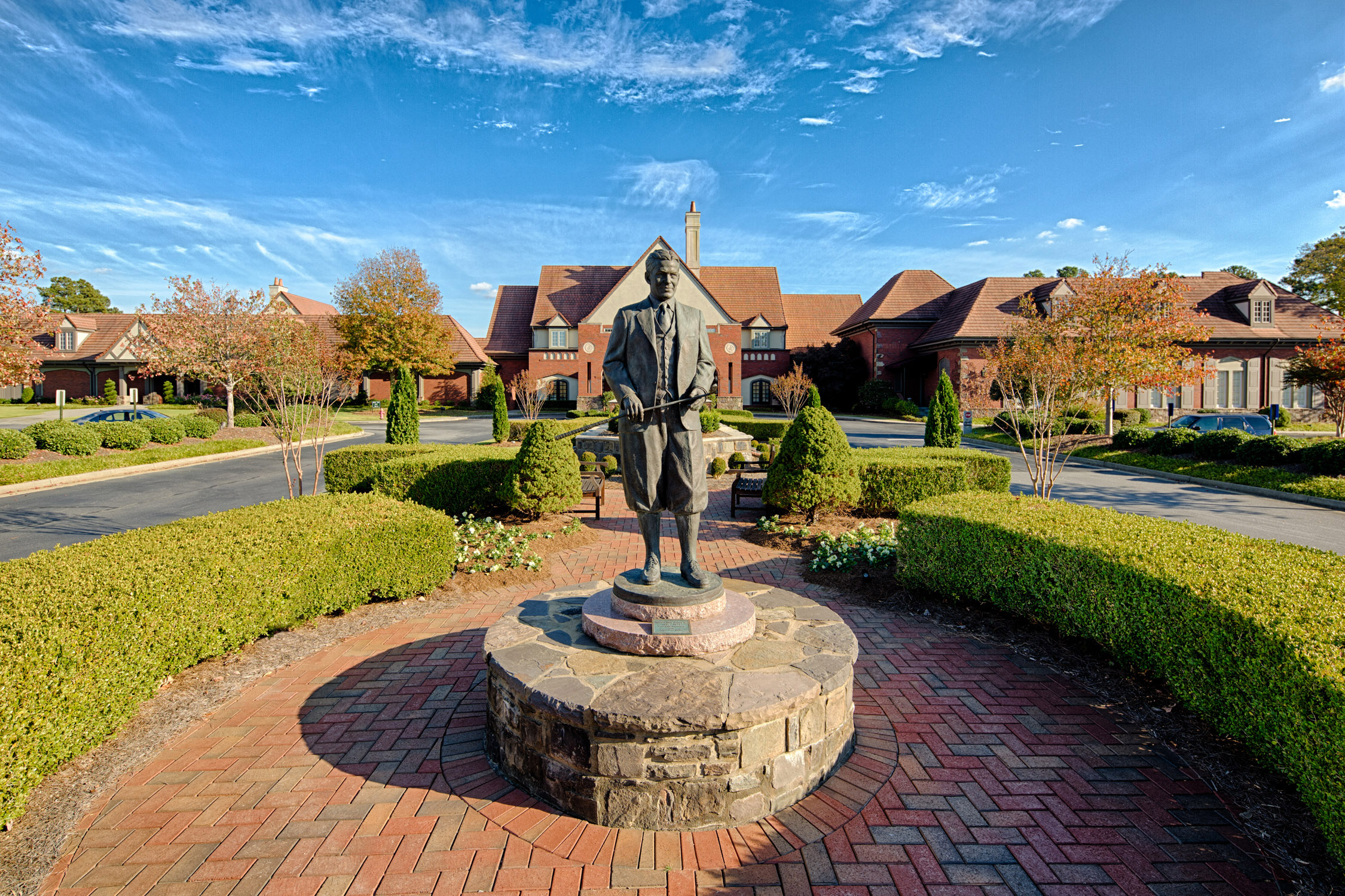
Statue of Bobby Jones at the entrance to Atlanta Athletic Club.

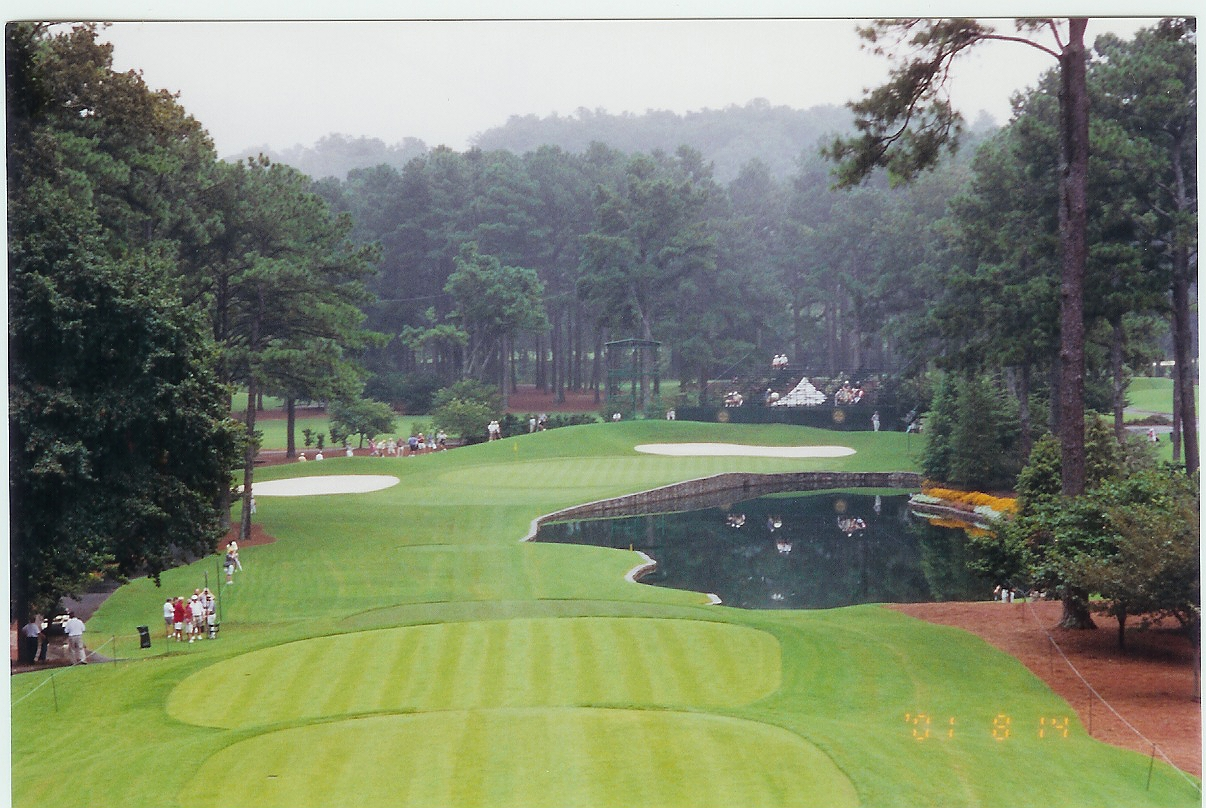
The 15th green on the Highlands course.

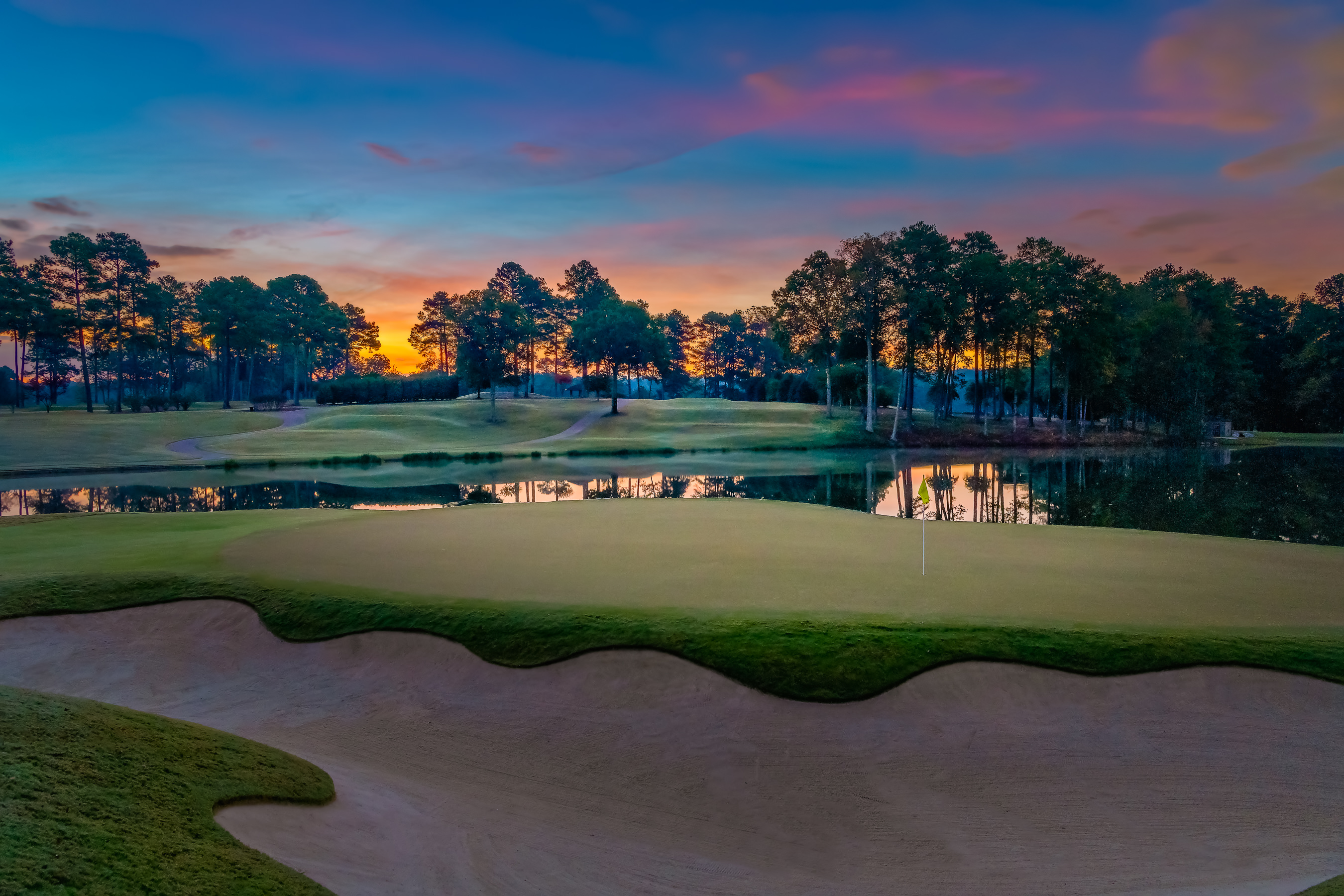
Behind the 17th green on the Highlands course.

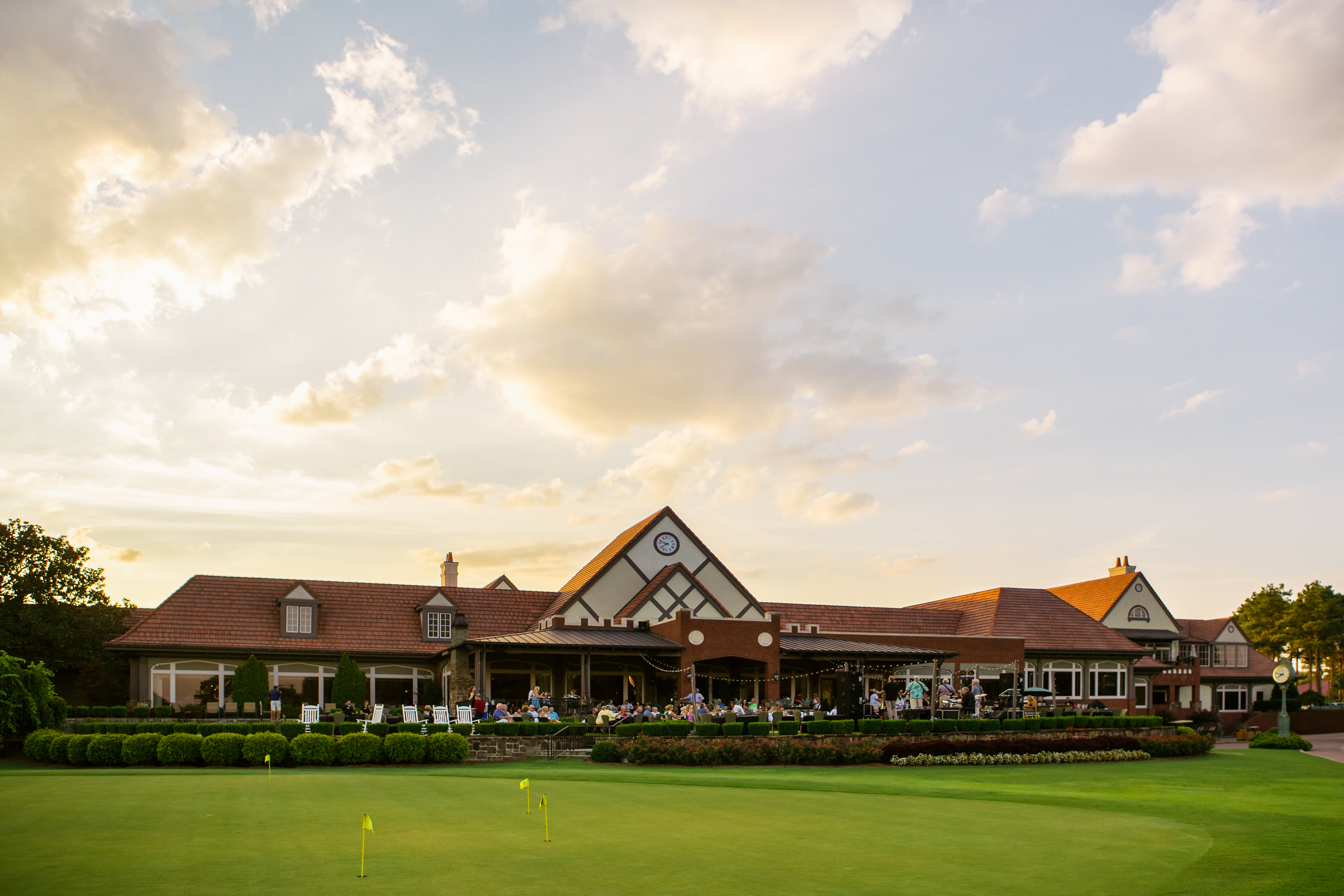
Back of the clubhouse from the practice putting green.

== Key dates ==
- 1898 – First organizational meeting and granting of club charter
- 1899 – Official opening of 56 Edgewood Avenue facility
- 1902 – Move to new clubhouse at 37 Auburn Avenue
- 1924 – Purchase of Carnegie Way property (10 story downtown club)
- 1926 – Opening of Carnegie Way property
- 1930 – Winning of Grand Slam by Bobby Jones Jr.
- 1963 – Purchase of River Bend property in Duluth
- 1967 – Opening of the new 27-hole golf course at River Bend
- 1968 – Vote by stockholders to sell East Lake Country Club
- 1969 – Selection of Atlanta Athletic Club Country Club as name for River Bend
- 1971 – Decision to sell Carnegie Way town club
- 1973 – Destruction of Carnegie Way town club
- 2003 - Second redesign of Riverside, by Rees Jones
- 2016 – Second redesign of Highlands, by Rees Jones
- 2022 - Third redesign of Riverside, by Tripp Davis

== Scorecards ==
Atlanta Athletic Club – Highlands Course
Tee	Rating/Slope	1	2	3	4	5	6	7	8	9	Out	10	11	12	13	14	15	16	17	18	In	Total
1976 U.S. Open	-- / --	455	450	460	205	540	440	175	420	415	3,560	370	480	510	390	415	215	410	205	460	3,455	7,015
1981 PGA	-- / --	456	458	469	210	546	445	185	422	419	3,610	374	470	510	390	415	215	410	213	463	3,460	7,070
2001 PGA	-- / --	430	471	469	204	541	425	183	463	416	3,602	439	454	547	364	442	227	441	207	490	3,511	7,213
2011 PGA	-- / --	454	512	475	219	565	425	184	467	426	3,727	442	457	551	372	468	260	476	207	507	3,740	7,467
Par	U.S.Open & PGA	4	4	4	3	5	4	3	4	4	35	4	4	5	4	4	3	4	3	4	35	70
Champ	77.0 / 152	446	543	478	219	567	426	197	470	429	3,775	436	457	555	391	468	260	485	210	576	3,838	7,613
Gold	75.9 / 149	442	540	475	194	548	425	183	446	426	3,679	421	443	523	387	451	227	409	207	557	3,625	7,304
Blue	73.9 / 141	398	512	445	165	541	403	179	421	407	3,471	405	421	495	364	413	204	373	186	528	3,389	6,860
Tournament	72.6 / 142	398	471	407	142	541	403	179	376	407	3,324	379	393	474	364	365	204	373	154	528	3,234	6,558
White	71.3 / 134	368	471	407	142	501	370	162	376	372	3,169	379	393	474	339	365	175	336	154	500	3,115	6,284
Green	68.8 / 127	324	448	363	128	469	330	135	349	351	2,897	362	339	448	307	335	145	296	124	462	2,818	5,715
SI	Men's	13	3	5	15	1	9	17	7	11		12	6	2	14	8	16	10	18	4
Par		4	5	4	3	5	4	3	4	4	36	4	4	5	4	4	3	4	3	5	36	72
SI	Women's	9	3	7	15	1	13	17	5	11		6	8	2	12	10	18	14	16	4
Green	74.5 / 142	324	448	363	128	469	330	135	349	351	2,897	362	339	448	307	335	145	296	124	462	2,818	5,715
Tournament	73.3 / 136	310	441	324	128	436	330	135	295	351	2,750	353	339	389	292	323	145	296	124	397	2,658	5,408
Black	71.6 / 131	310	441	324	92	436	296	90	295	307	2,591	353	318	389	292	323	103	266	103	397	2,544	5,135
Silver	70.1 / 129	310	399	289	92	405	296	90	253	273	2,407	353	318	389	266	283	103	266	95	358	2,431	4,838

Atlanta Athletic Club – Riverside Course
Tee	Rating/Slope	1	2	3	4	5	6	7	8	9	Out	10	11	12	13	14	15	16	17	18	In	Total
Gold	74.9 / 141	602	444	168	398	584	197	481	215	488	3,577	407	179	554	417	311	440	456	243	567	3,574	7,152
Blue	73.2 / 137	571	421	155	370	555	179	446	192	462	3,351	384	165	529	403	389	430	440	217	544	3,401	6,752
Tournament
White	70.6 / 133	547	398	125	348	540	148	397	160	423	3,086	362	141	499	370	276	409	390	181	508	3,136	6,222
Green	67.5 / 125	490	358	104	316	472	121	348	135	381	2,722	330	115	454	319	249	369	340	153	445	2,774	5,496
SI	Men's	5	4	3	4	5	3	4	3	4		35	4	3	5	4	4	4	3	5
Par		5	4	5	4	4	3	4	3	4	36	4	3	4	5	4	4	4	3	5	36	71
Green	73.6 / 130	480	367	461	320	336	122	332	133	372	2,923	322	113	370	418	301	346	317	154	449	2,790	5,713
Black	64.9 / 122	450	295	80	260	424	102	325	122	338	2,396	298	95	416	273	225	312	305	131	405	2,460	4,857

== Major tournaments hosted ==
Year	Tournament	Course(s)	Winner
1950	U.S. Women's Amateur	East Lake Country Club	Beverly Hanson
1963	Ryder Cup	East Lake Country Club	USA - Arnold Palmer
1976	U.S. Open	Highlands	Jerry Pate
1981	PGA Championship	Highlands	Larry Nelson
1990	U.S. Women's Open	Riverside	Betsy King
2001	PGA Championship	Highlands	David Toms
2011	PGA Championship	Highlands	Keegan Bradley
2014	U.S. Amateur	Riverside (stroke play); Highlands (stroke and match play)	Gunn Yang
2017	Arnold Palmer Cup	Highlands	U.S. 19.5–11.5
2021	Women's PGA Championship	Highlands	Nelly Korda
