= East Lake Foundation =

American non-profit organization

- Formation: 1995
- Legal status: Non Profit Foundation
- Purpose: Community Revitalization
- Headquarters: Atlanta, Georgia, U.S.
- Region served: East Lake, Atlanta
- Revenue: $13,369,734 (2014)
- Expenses: $16,972,626 (2014)
- Website: http://www.eastlakefoundation.org

The East Lake Foundation is a non-profit organization located within the city of Atlanta, Georgia. The purpose of the Foundation is the revitalization of the East Lake Community.

== History ==
In the 1960s the East Lake community fell victim to white flight and urban decay. As the years progressed, the community become known as "Little Vietnam" by local police and as one of the top crime and drug communities in the country, located in Atlanta Police precinct Zone 6.

In 1995, Tom Cousins, real estate developer and philanthropist, established the East Lake Foundation and partnered with Atlanta Housing Authority President and CEO Renée Glover, East Lake Meadows resident leader Eva Davis, and local business and community leaders to undertake the monumental task of revitalizing the East Lake neighborhood and changing the conditions and the destinies of the people living there.

Ms. Glover and Integral Properties CEO Egbert Perry developed a holistic approach for revitalizing communities in Atlanta that was utilized by Mr. Cousins, Ms. Davis, Ms. Glover and other key partners in the East Lake neighborhood that included mixed-income housing, cradle-to-college education and community wellness. The East Lake Foundation serves as the community quarterback organization in the effort to foster and sustain the successful implementation of the approach.

As part of the initiative, Cousins and his partners replaced East Lake Meadows with The Villages of East Lake, a new mixed-income housing complex, opened the Charles R. Drew Charter School with rigorous academic standards and high expectations, constructed the East Lake Family YMCA, and brought in an array of services and resources for families, including a college and career readiness program, early childhood education programs, a before and after school program, an economic, financial and career development program, and The First Tee® of Metro Atlanta golf and life skills program.

The Foundation also helped to open the Charlie Yates Golf Course, a 9-hole public golf course located within the East Lake community which is also home to The First Tee of Metro Atlanta.

== Mission ==
The East Lake Foundation's mission is to provide the tools for families in The Villages of East Lake and students in the Charles R. Drew Charter School education pipeline to build a better life for themselves and future generations through cradle-to-college education, mixed-income housing, and community wellness programs.

The East Lake Foundation serves as the community quarterback organization in the effort to sustain the successful revitalization of the East Lake neighborhood. The Foundation operates programs, and through integral partnerships it supports other programs and services that transform place and build promise.

== Charles R. Drew Charter School ==
Established in 2000, as the first charter school in Atlanta Public Schools, Charles R. Drew Charter School is an integral part of the East Lake Foundation's holistic model for community revitalization. Serving more than 1,900 students from K-12th grade, Drew's innovative Project-Based Learning approach with an integration of the STEAM (Science, Technology, Engineering, Arts and Mathematics) curriculum and a strong foundation in literacy helps all students reach their highest potential.

In 2017, Drew Charter School graduated its inaugural senior class. 100 percent of students graduated and were accepted to college. Today, Drew Charter School's Elementary, Junior and Senior Academies are top ranked in Atlanta Public Schools.

== East Lake Golf Club ==
East Lake Golf Club has played a central role in the remarkable transformation of the East Lake community. Its motto, “Golf with a Purpose,” was coined early in the process, after it was realized that golf would be a galvanizing element of the new East Lake community.

Today, several high-profile golf events at the Club provide financial support to the East Lake Foundation, including the PGA TOUR Championship. East Lake Golf Club has been the permanent home of the TOUR Championship since 2005. The tournament was first played at East Lake in 1998 and has been held at East Lake 21 times since then. The TOUR Championship is the culminating event of the PGA TOUR Playoffs for the FedEx Cup, with only the top 30 players on the points list qualifying each year.

== Purpose Built Communities ==
In 2009 Tom Cousins founded Purpose Built Communities along with Warren Buffett and Julian Robertson to replicate Cousin's East Lake model of community revitalization within other areas of concentrated poverty throughout the United States. Purpose Built Communities is currently present in 29 communities throughout the United States.
