= Kingswood Methodist Episcopal Church =

Historic church in Delaware, United States

- U.S. National Register of Historic Places
- Location within Delaware Location within the United States
- Location: Fourteenth and Claymont Sts., Wilmington, Delaware
- Coordinates: 39°44′36″N 75°31′58″W
- Area: less than one acre
- Architectural style: Vernacular Romanesque
- NRHP reference No.: 89000008
- Added to NRHP: February 9, 1989

Kingswood Methodist Episcopal Church, also known as Kingswood Mission of St. Paul's M.E. Church, Kingswood Community Center, and Jimmy Jenkins Community Center, was a historic Methodist Episcopal church located in Wilmington, New Castle County, Delaware in Riverside–11th Street Bridge. It was built in 1891, and was a two bay by three bay, detached brick structure in a Vernacular Romanesque style.

It was added to the National Register of Historic Places in 1989. It has since been demolished.

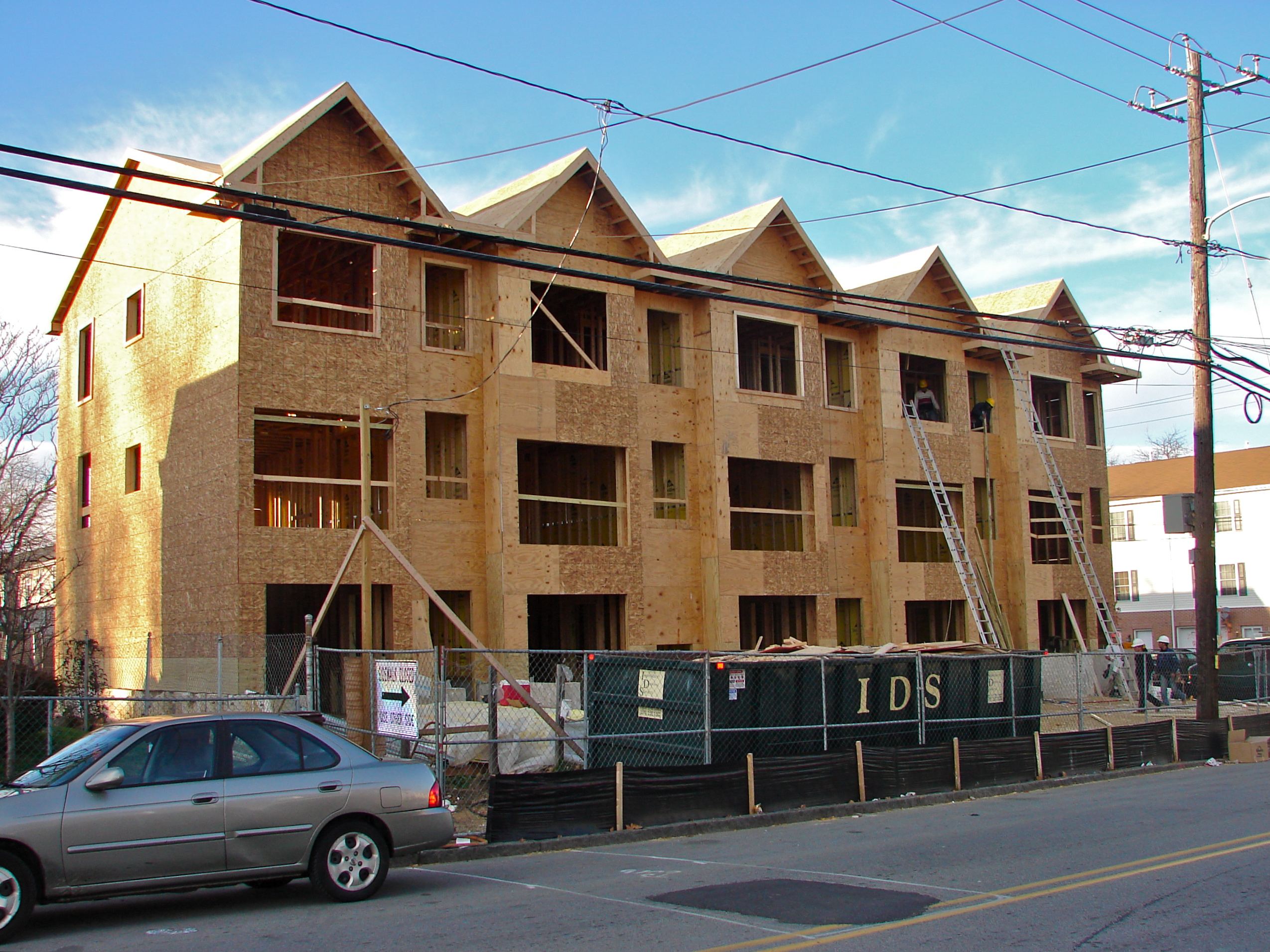
Former location of Kingswood Methodist Episcopal Church, November 2010
