= Riverside–11th Street Bridge =

- Unincorporated community
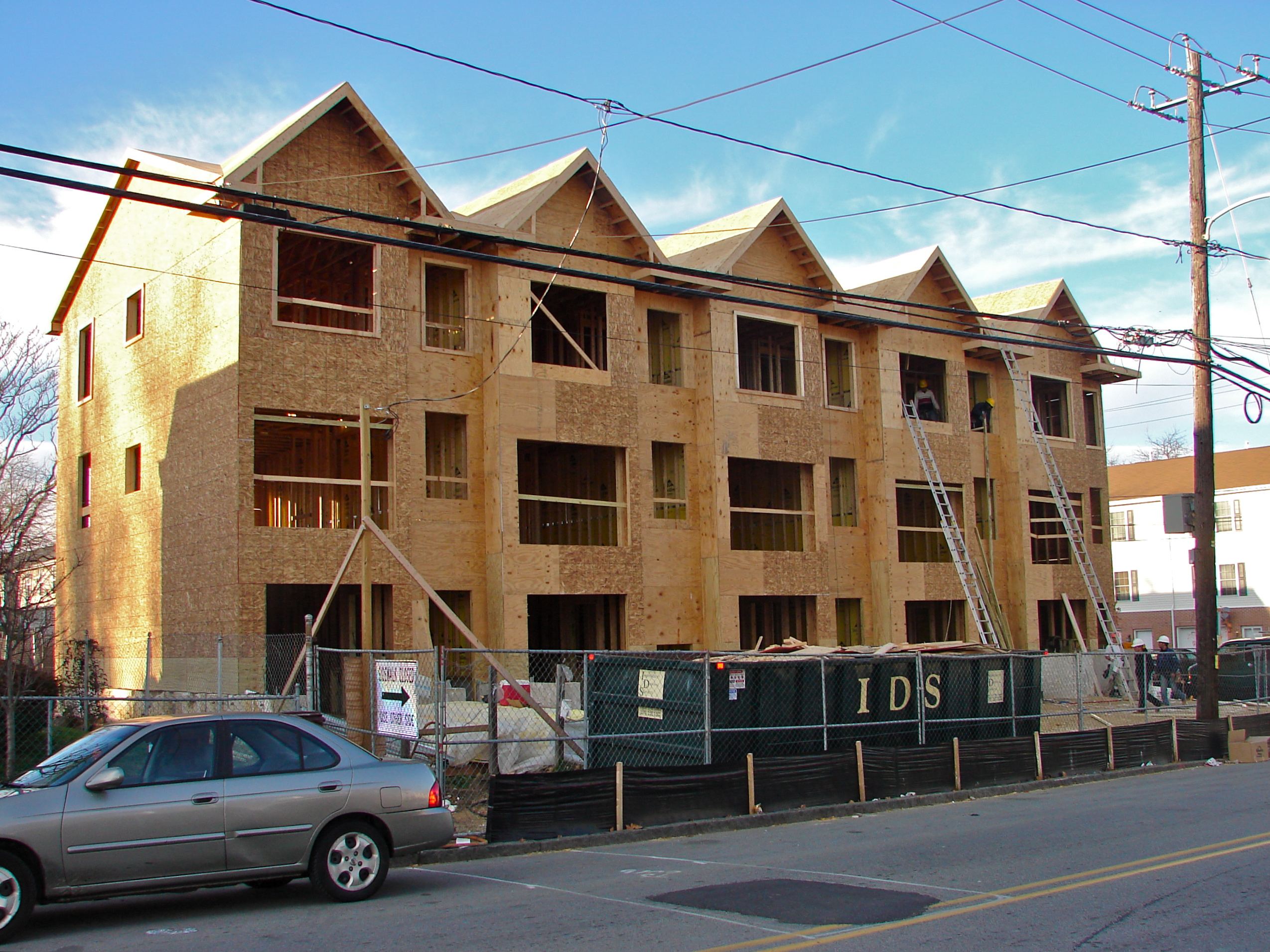
- Former site of Kingswood M.E. Church at 14th and Claymont

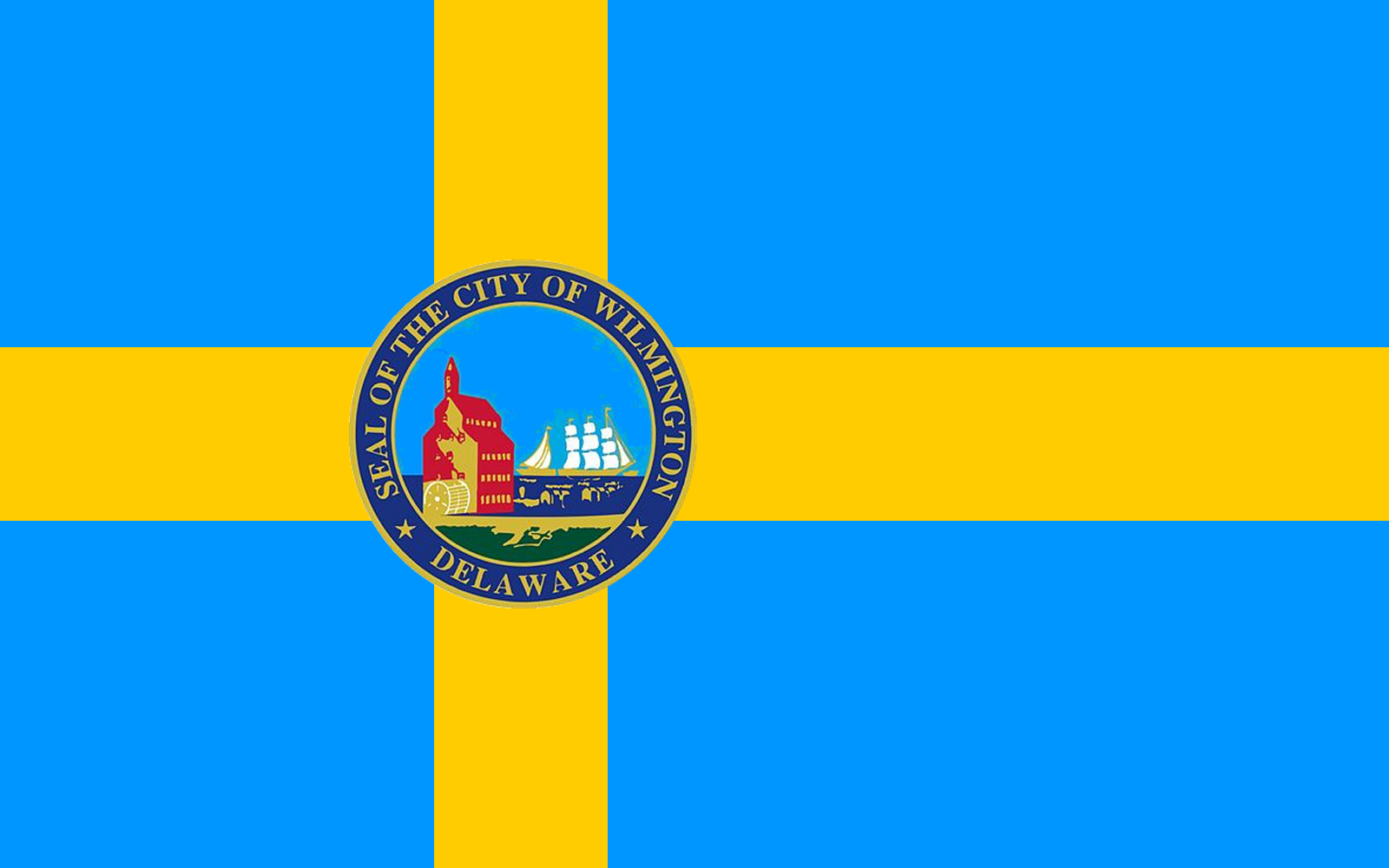
- Flag

- Location within Delaware Location within the United States
- Coordinates: 39°44′38″N 75°31′46″W
- Country: United States
- State: Delaware
- County: New Castle
- Elevation: 10 ft (3.0 m)
- Time zone: UTC-5 (Eastern (EST))
  - Summer (DST): UTC-4 (EDT)
- Area code: 302

Riverside–11th Street Bridge is a district in the northeastern section of Wilmington, Delaware.

== Geography ==
Riverside–11th Street Bridge lies north of Brandywine Creek and south off the city line with Edgemoore. The western border is formed by Northeast Boulevard (U.S. Route 13), the other side of which is Price's Run and East Lake neighborhoods, which include the Brandywine Village Historic District. The Northeast Corridor (carrying Amtrak and SEPTA Wilmington/Newark Line) runs alongs the district's eastern side, separating it from the Howard R. Young Correctional Institution in Gander Hill, Amtrak's Wilmington Maintenance Facility, and Norfolk Southern's Shellpot Branch. It roughly corresponds to census tract 30.2

== History ==
A wooden bridge built in the 1860s over Brandywine Creek was replaced by a steel drawbridge known as the Eleventh Street Bridge in 1882. The current Northern Boulevard Bridge was built in 1932.

The neighborhood was the site of the junction of the Pennsylvania Railroad (PRR) Brandywine Branch and its main line at a point called Landlith and ran parallel with the creek on city streets and what has become Brandywine Park. The junction lends its name to the Landlith Interlocking.

In conjunction with the construction of the Wilmington Rail Viaduct and the Wilmington Shop complex in the early 20th century, developers started building modest workers’ housing in the vicinity of Vandever Avenue at the southern end of the property.

St. James A. U. M. P. Church church site was purchased on Jan. 13, 1872 and the corner-stone laid on October 12, 1884.

The cornerstone of Kingswood Methodist Episcopal Church was laid in 1891. The Kingswood Community Center started in 1946, when a group of residents came together to create a space for youth afterschool activities, which they found at the Kingswood United Methodist Church. By 1956, the church space became too small for the program, and with financial help of foundations and local philanthropists the current 12-acre (4.9 ha) site on Bowers Street was purchased.

The E.D. Robinson Urban Farm, also known as the Brandywine Urban Farm, is at Brandywine Street and East 12th Street. Once a debris-covered lot, it was transformed at the initiation of a local bartender, Adrienne Spencer. Named after Eric Robinson, a former City Councilman and neighborhood activist, the farm, has 600 square feet of community gardening and 1,400 square feet of commercial garden space. It has been recognized by the Delaware Center for Horticulture as a model of success in urban agriculture.

In 2018, Riverside was designated the 19th location to participate in Purpose Built Communities, a public-private initiate to re-invigorate neighborhoods. In 2020, the stakeholders announced a townhouse development which includes affordable housing.

DART First State operates buses through the district.
