= Sandpines Golf Links =

Public golf course in Oregon, United States

Coordinates: 44°00′10″N 124°06′34″W

Sandpines Golf Links is a public golf course in Florence, Oregon, United States, on the central Oregon Coast.

== Course ==
The course was designed by Rees Jones and is bordered on the ocean side by the Oregon Dunes National Recreation Area.

Bent Grass is predominantly used.

It is a regulation 18-hole, par-72 course, measuring around 7200 yards. The slope rating is around 130 (making it reasonably difficult for bogey golfers).

The first nine holes have a coastal forest character. The second nine holes have a more traditional links character.

== Ranking ==
1993: "Best New Public Course in America" in by Golf Digest

1998: The course was rated 72nd in Golf Magazine's category of "Top 100 Courses You Can Play in the U.S.".
