= Atlanta Sports Awards =

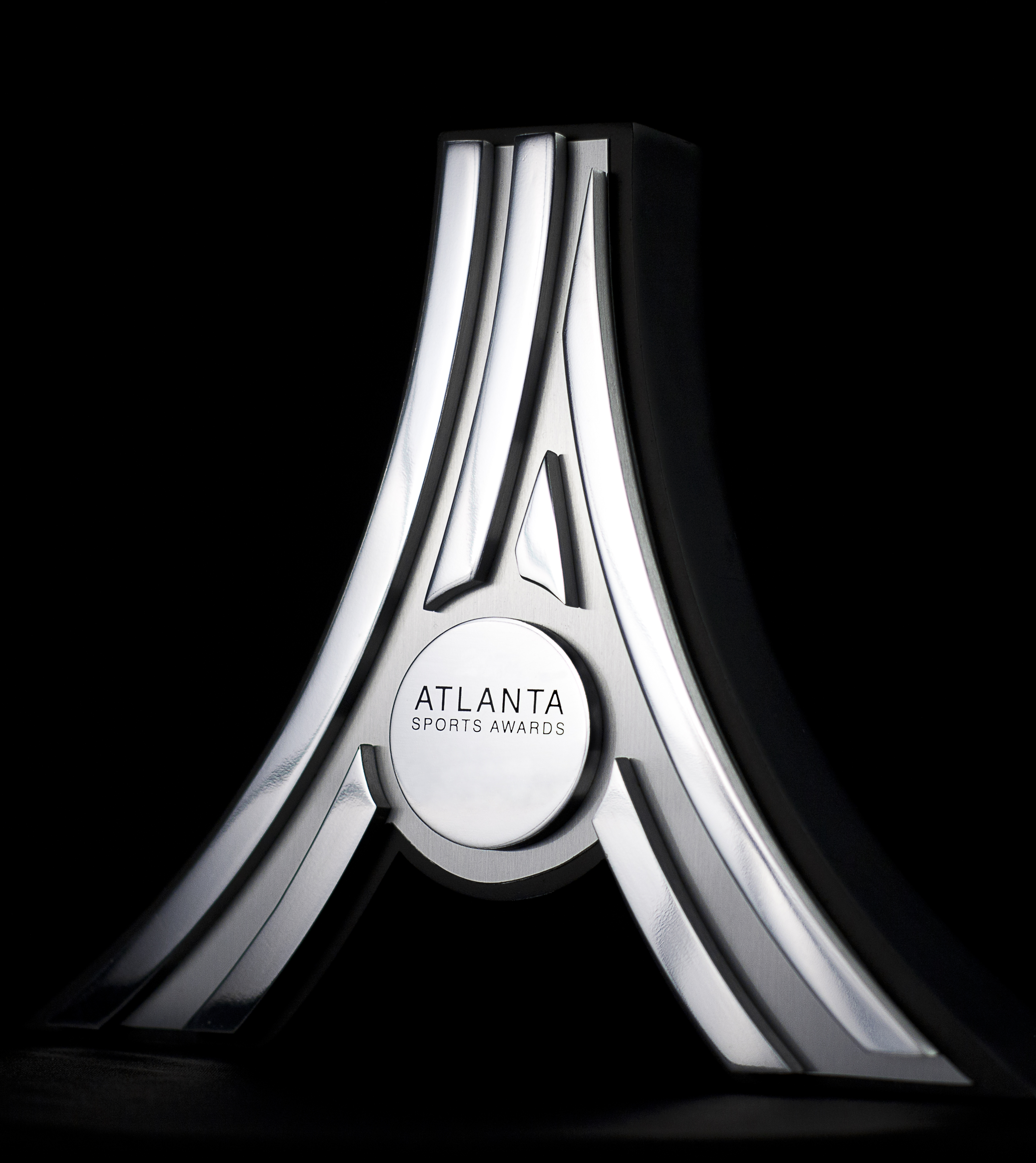
- The Atlanta Sports Award Trophy presented at the award show.
- Country: United States
- Website: www.atlantasportsawards.com

The Atlanta Sports Awards is an award program created by the Atlanta Sports Council in 2006 to honor and celebrate the most accomplished athletes, coaches, teams and outstanding contributors in the Atlanta region. Formed as a way to rally the Atlanta sports community and recognize athletic excellence on an annual basis, the awards aim to honor those individuals who distinguish themselves from the five-plus million people who live in the Atlanta area.

The Atlanta Sports Council, a division of the Metro Atlanta Chamber, facilitates the growth and development of sports in metro Atlanta by serving as an event recruiter. The organization plays an important role in improving the quality of life for residents in the region, works to drive economic growth and visibility, and acts as an advocate for the area teams and annual sporting events.

== Awards ==
=== Categories ===
The "A" awards are given on behalf of the Atlanta sports community to individuals and teams who have achieved athletic excellence during the calendar year. Category finalists are reflective of a 29-county Atlanta region which includes six professional sports teams, 14 universities, 12 junior colleges and more than 250 public and private high schools.

Coach of the Year: the Atlanta coach whose dedication and commitment to coaching excellence is fostered in the lives of his/her athletes both on and off the field.

Collegiate Athlete of the Year: the Atlanta collegiate athlete who demonstrates superior physical ability in his/her sport.

Community Spirit Award: the Atlanta athlete or coach who is actively involved in the community and epitomizes the highest standards for leadership, sportsmanship and integrity. From 2006 to 2012, recipients of this award were named as the Sports Person of the Year.

High School Athlete of the Year: the Atlanta high school athlete who demonstrates superior physical ability in his/her sport.

Professional Athlete of the Year: the Atlanta professional athlete who demonstrates superior physical ability in his/her sport.

High School Scholar Athletes of the Year: the Atlanta male and female high school student-athlete whose desire to achieve success in sport is equally matched by a desire to achieve success in the classroom. All finalists are nominated by their school principal and athletic director. Each recipient receives a $1,000 scholarship to be used at an institution of higher education. (This award was given between 2006 – 2013)

Team of the Year: the Atlanta team whose dedication and work ethic resulted in a consistently high level of achievement or a championship.

== Winners ==
Name	2016	2015	2014	2013	2012	2011	2010	2009	2008	2007	2006
Coach of the Year	Mike Budenholzer	Paul Johnson	Keith Maloof	Mike Smith	Mickey Conn	Mike Smith	Paul Johnson	Mike Smith	Manuel Diaz	Suzanne Yoculan	Bobby Cox
Team of the Year	Atlanta Hawks	Kennesaw State Baseball	Atlanta Dream	Atlanta Falcons	Atlanta Dream	Atlanta Falcons	Georgia Tech Football	UGA Gymnastics	UGA Gymnastics	UGA Gymnastics	Atlanta Braves
Professional Athlete of the Year	Paul Millsap	Julio Jones	Craig Kimbrel	Matt Ryan	Craig Kimbrel	Roddy White	Stewart Cink	Matt Ryan	Ilya Kovalchuk	Marian Hossa	Andruw Jones
Collegiate Athlete of the Year	Lee McCoy	Max Pentecost	Aaron Murray	Jarvis Jones	Jarvis Jones	Jen Yee	Courtney Kupets	Knowshon Moreno	Kara Lynn Joyce	Calvin Johnson	DJ Schockley
Community Spirit Award/Sports Person of the Year	Malcolm Mitchell	Chris Conley	Matt Braynt	Ron Hunter	Al Horford	Bill Curry	Tim Hudson	Keith Brooking	John Smoltz	John Smoltz	Warrick Dunn
High School Athlete of the Year	Jaylen Brown	Michael Chavis	Diamond DeShields	Alvin Kamara	Robert Nkemdiche	Brian Randolph	Derrick Favors	Tim Beckham	Maya Moore	Javaris Crittenton	Louis Williams
Female HS Scholar Athlete of the Year	NA	NA	NA	Tori Weprinsky	Jennifer Shults	Andrea Howard	Megan Louise	Chelsea Hassett	Kelsey Spinks	Christina Carlson	Sonica Li
Male HS Scholar Athlete of the Year	NA	NA	NA	Jacob Wieczorek	Cyrus Wilson	Matthew Cribb	Rawson Haverty	Luke Davis	Ryan Smith	Vibin Kundukulam	Micah Weiss
Award Show Emcees	Wes Durham	Wes Durham	Wes Durham	Wes Durham	Bob Rathbun	Bob Rathbun	Ernie Johnson Jr.	Ernie Johnson Jr.	Erin Andrews	Wes Durham	Brad Nessler

=== The Lifetime Achievement Award ===
This award recognizes individuals who have made a positive impact on the sports world and Atlanta community throughout their career. (Winner is announced prior to the event)

Year	Lifetime Achievement Award
2020	Steve Koonin
2019	Dikembe Mutombo
2018	John Schuerholz
2017	Arthur Blank
2016	John Smoltz – former Atlanta Brave and Major League Baseball Hall of Famer, 8-Time All Star, World Series Champion, Cy Young Award Winner.
2015	Tom Glavine – former Atlanta Brave and Major League Baseball Hall of Famer, 10-Time All Star, World Series MVP, 2-Time National League Cy Young Award Winner.
2014	Tommy Nobis – Known as Mr. Falcon, Nobis was the first ever player drafted by the Atlanta Falcons organization in the inaugural 1966 season, went on to become NFL Rookie of the Year, 5 Pro Bowls, his uniform #60 was the first one the Falcons ever retired and it's been worn by only him.
2013	Chipper Jones- former Atlanta Brave, No.1 overall pick in the 1990 MLB draft, 1999 National League MVP, eight-time Major League Baseball All-Star, holds record for most RBIs all-time for third basemen (1,623).
2012	Dominique Wilkins- former Atlanta Hawk player, Naismith Memorial Basketball Hall of Famer, three-time All-SEC performer at the University of Georgia, nine-time NBA All-Star and eight-time All-NBA team member.
2011	Bobby Cox – led the Atlanta Braves to 15 division titles and won more than 2,000 games as Manager of the team.
2010	Tom Cousins – major driving force in Atlanta's early sports landscape, Cousins Properties brought the Hawks to Atlanta and built Atlanta's first sports arena- the Omni Coliseum.
2009	Ted Turner – purchased the Atlanta Braves in 1976 and the Atlanta Hawks in 1977 in the effort to provide sports programming on his first broadcasting network, TBS Superstation.
2008	Billy Payne – served as President of the Committee for the Olympic bid and was responsible for Atlanta hosting the 1996 Centennial Olympic Games.
2007	Vince Dooley – most successful coach in University of Georgia Football history with 201 wins before serving as the university's Athletics Director the Bulldogs.
2006	Hank Aaron – former Atlanta Brave, National League MVP, recipient of three Gold Gloves and Major League Baseball record holder for total bases, extra-base hits and RBI.

=== Furman Bisher Award for Sports Media Excellence ===
The Atlanta Sports Council honored Furman Bisher in 2000 for his career contributions as an Atlanta Journal-Constitution sports columnist. From that point forward, the Furman Bisher Award for Sports Media Excellence was created to recognize members of Atlanta media for their outstanding coverage of local and regional sports and was awarded to individuals from 2001 to 2010.

Furman Bisher Award winners include:

2010	2009	2008	2007	2006	2005	2004	2003	2002	2001
Brad Nessler	Skip Caray & Pete Van Wieren	Larry Munson	Ernie Johnson Jr.	Wes Durham	Tim Tucker	Chris Dimino	Chuck Dowdle	Fred Kalil	Tony Barnhart

=== Amateur Athlete of the Year ===
The Atlanta Amateur Athlete of the Year awards was awarded from 2006–2010 to area amateur athletes who demonstrated superior physical ability in his/her sport.

Amateur Athlete	2010	2009	2008	2007	2006
Winner	Amanda Weir	Angelo Taylor	Philippa Raschker	Regina Jaquess	Amanda Weir
Finalist	Chalonda Goodman	Kara Lynn Joyce	Melanie Oudin	Leslie Gaston	Sada Jacobson
Finalist	Mariah Stackhouse	Sarah Steinmann	Melanie Wilson	Zakiya Randall	John Tuttle

== Finalists ==
Coach of the Year: Ron Hunter and Phyllis Arthur (2016), Mike Sansing and Phyllis Arthur (2015), Jack Bauerle and Fredi Gonzalez (2014), Keith Maloof and Mark Richt (2013), Mark Richt and Marynell Meadors(2012).

Team of the Year: GA State Men's Basketball and Roswell HS Football (2016), Buford HS Football and UGA Women's Swimming and Diving (2015), Norcross High School Football and University of Georgia Swimming & Diving (2014), University of Georgia Football and Norcross High School Football (2013), Grayson High School Football and Walton High School Girls' Tennis (2012), Atlanta Dream and Walton High School Girls' Tennis (2011), Atlanta Hawks and UGA Girls' Gymnastics (2010), Buford High School Football and Norcross High School Boys' Basketball (2009), Buford High School Football and Wesleyan High School Volleyball (2008), Peachtree Ridge High School Football and Roswell High School Football (2007), UGA Girls' Gymnastics and UGA Football (2006).

Professional Athlete of the Year: Devonta Freeman and Angel McCoughtry (2016), Paul Millsap and Craig Kimbrel (2015), Angel McCoughtry and Al Horford (2014), Tony Gonzalez and Craig Kimbrel (2013), Al Horford and Brian McCann (2012), Brian McCann and Angel McCoughtry (2011), Melanie Oudin and Brian McCann (2010), Chipper Jones and Michael Turner(2009), Joe Johnson and Chipper Jones (2008), Brian McCann and Joe Johnson (2007), Warrick Dunn and John Smoltz (2006).

Collegiate Athlete of the Year: Andrew Kosic and Ivie Drake (2016), R.J. Hunter and Ollie Schniederjans (2015), Allison Schmitt and Kentavious Caldwell-Pope (2014), Kat Ding and Sasha Goodlett (2013), Mark Pope and Allison Schmitt (2012), Derek Dietrich and Allison Schmitt (2011), Derrick Morgan and Drew Butler (2010), Jonathan Dwyer and Michael Johnson (2009), Tashard Choice and John Isner(2008), Tasha Humphrey and Courtney Kupets (2007), Tasha Humphrey and Jarrett Jack (2006).

Community Spirit Award (Sports Person of the Year from 2006–2012): Brian McCann and Stewart Cink (2011), Darryl Richard and Joe Johnson (2010), Keith Brookings and John Smoltz (2009), Al Horford and Brian Finneran (2008), Tim Hudson and Ilya Kovalchuk (2007), Joe Johnson and Arthur Blank (2006).

High School Athlete of the Year: Lindsey Billings and Candace Hill (2016), Asia Durr and Caitlin Cooper (2015), Lorenzo Carter and Jimmy Yoder (2014), Carl Lawson and Robert Nkemdiche (2013), Shannon Scott and Emily Zabor (2012), Rick Lewis and Timmy Byerly (2011), Hutson Mason and Anne Marie Armstrong (2010), Kathleen Hersey and Derrick Favors (2009), JJ Hickson and Ashley Razey (2008), Eric Berry and Maya Moore (2007), Marcus Ball and Cameron Smith (2006).

== Event emcees ==
2016	2015	2014	2013	2012	2011	2010	2009	2008	2007	2006
Wes Durham	Wes Durham	Wes Durham	Wes Durham	Bob Rathbun	Bob Rathbun	Ernie Johnson Jr.	Ernie Johnson Jr.	Erin Andrews	Wes Durham	Brad Nessler
