= Charlie Yates Golf Course =

Golf course in Atlanta, Georgia, U.S.

- Interactive map of Charlie Yates Golf Course
- 33°44′35″N 84°18′56″W

Club information
- Location: Atlanta, Georgia, U.S.
- Established: 1930, 1998
- Type: Public
- Tota holes: 9
- Website: www.charlieyatesgolfcourse.com

Charlie Yates Golf Course
- Designed by: Rees Jones

In 1998 East Lake Golf Club's No. 2 golf course was transformed into the Charlie Yates Golf Course, a 9-hole "executive" public course that also provides golf education to children living in the city of Atlanta. The course was rated one of the top 10 short range courses in America by Golf Range Magazine and all profits from the course go to benefit the East Lake Foundation.

Charlie Yates was an East Lake golfer who won the British Amateur in 1938. Charlie grew up on Second Avenue, the street which separated East Lake's main course from its No. 2 course. His boyhood hero was Bobby Jones whom he knew and played with on the course at East Lake.
