= Steve Koonin =

American businessperson (born 1957)

Atlanta Hawks
- Position: Chief executive officer
- League: NBA

Personal information
- Born: June 6, 1957 (age 69) Atlanta, Georgia, U.S.

Career information
- College: University of Georgia

Steve Koonin (born June 6, 1957) is the chief executive officer of the Atlanta Hawks and State Farm Arena. He is the former president of Turner Broadcasting System. Koonin chairs the Georgia Aquarium and is on the boards of TKO Group Holdings, Rubicon Technologies, Fox Theatre, Metro Atlanta Chamber of Commerce, Emory Healthcare, and the Woodruff Arts Center.

== Early life and education ==
Koonin was born in 1957 in Atlanta, Georgia. He studied marketing at the University of Georgia. Koonin is Jewish.

== Career ==
=== Coca-Cola Company ===
Koonin spent more than a decade at the Coca-Cola Company. While serving as Coca Cola's VP of sports and entertainment marketing, Koonin was honored as the SportsBusiness Journal Sports Executive of the Year.

=== Turner Broadcasting System ===
He worked at Turner Broadcasting System for over 14 years, and served as the organization's president.

=== Atlanta Hawks ===
In April 2014, the Atlanta Hawks hired Koonin as CEO of the Atlanta Hawks & State Farm Arena.

By the end of 2015, the Hawks organization built 25 community basketball courts over five years in disadvantaged communities across the city of Atlanta. During the COVID-19 pandemic, the Atlanta Hawks leveraged partnerships with Emory Healthcare to provide thousands of meals weekly for workers on the front lines. In June 2020, Atlanta Hawks were the first NBA team to commit their arena for use as a polling site – the largest voting center in the state of Georgia – during the 2020 election.

=== Boards and accolades ===
Koonin serves as the chairman for the Georgia Aquarium. He is on the boards of TKO Group Holdings, Rubicon Technologies, Fox Theatre, Metro Atlanta Chamber of Commerce, Emory Healthcare, and the Woodruff Arts Center. Koonin was a former member of the board of GameStop, resigning in 2020.

Koonin has been listed on Atlanta Magazine’s 55 Most Powerful People shaping Atlanta, Atlanta Business Chronicle's 100 Most Influential Atlantans, and Georgia Trend's 100 Most Influential Georgians. Atlanta Sports Council awarded Koonin a Lifetime Achievement Award in 2020.

== Personal life ==
Koonin is married to Eydie Koonin, an Atlanta-based real estate agent. They have two children: David Koonin, a sports media agent with Creative Artists Agency, and Amy Beth Koonin Taylor. In 2013, Steve and his wife Eydie created the Koonin Scholars Fund at the Grady College of Journalism and Mass Communication which provides scholarships for students.

== See also ==
- List of National Basketball Association team presidents
