= Royal Oaks Golf Club =

Golf club in Moncton, New Brunswick, Canada

Coordinates: 46°09′34″N 64°47′20″W

- Interactive map of Royal Oaks Golf Club

Club information
- Location: Moncton (Canada)
- Established: 2000
- Type: Public
- Tota holes: 18
- Website: www.royaloaks.nb.ca
- Designed by: Rees Jones
- Par: 72
- Length: 7103 yards
- Course rating: 76.2

Royal Oaks Golf Club is an 18-hole par 72 links style golf club. Opened in July 2000, the course is in Moncton, New Brunswick, Canada. It is the first course in Canada to be designed by U.S. Open Architect Rees Jones. It was built to US Open standards. A new residential development was developed around the course which includes a 4-story condominium complex that opened in 2007.

== See also ==
- Moncton Sport Facilities
- List of golf courses in New Brunswick
