= Stewart Maiden =

Scottish golf professional (1886–1948)

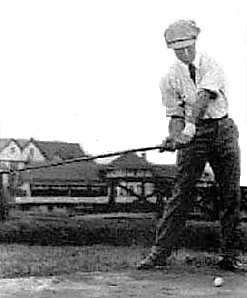
- Maiden in the downswing, c. 1912

Personal information
- Nickname: Kiltie
- Nationality: Scotland; United States
- Born: February 13, 1886 Carnoustie, Angus, Scotland
- Died: November 4, 1948 (aged 62) Atlanta, Georgia, U.S.

Career
- Sport: Golf
- Status: Professional

Best results in major championships
- Masters Tournament: DNP
- PGA Championship: DNP
- U.S. Open: T42: 1908
- The Open Championship: DNP

Stewart Maiden (February 13, 1886 – November 4, 1948) was the head golf professional at East Lake Golf Club in Atlanta, Georgia. He was best known for teaching grand slam winning golfer Bobby Jones.

== Early life ==
Maiden was a native of Carnoustie, Scotland, and followed his brother James Maiden to the United States, succeeding him as the head professional at East Lake Golf Club in 1908. Maiden was the son of James Maiden and Elspeth Maiden née McLean. His father James worked as a payroll clerk at a metal foundry in Carnoustie.

== Golf career ==
Along with Jones, Maiden is known for teaching other golfers such as Watts Gunn and Alexa Stirling. Maiden made Jones his first set of matched clubs. As a young boy, Jones followed Maiden around the course at East Lake and fashioned his swing after the professional. In 1919 Maiden left East Lake, having been replaced by Willie Ogg, to accept a post as professional at the St. Louis Country Club in Ladue, Missouri.

Jones said about Maiden later in his life, "The best luck that I ever had in golf was when Stewart Maiden came from Carnoustie to be pro at the East Lake Club. Stewart had the finest and soundest style I have ever seen. Naturally I did not know this at the time, but I grew up swinging like him. I imitated his style, like a monkey I suppose".

Maiden opened an indoor golf school in New York in 1930 and then returned to Atlanta to become the first professional at the then newly opened Peachtree Golf Club in 1948.

== Death and legacy ==
Maiden died on November 4, 1948, in Atlanta, Georgia. Harvey Penick said of Maiden: "I've always said the best golf teacher of all has to be Stewart Maiden."
