= East Lake Golf Club =

Private golf club in Atlanta, Georgia, US

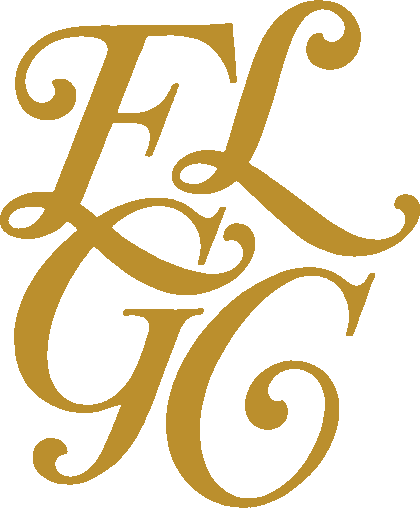

- Location within the United States Location within Georgia
- Interactive map of East Lake Golf Club
- 33.743°N 84.303°W

Club information
- Location: 2575 Alston Drive SE; Atlanta, Georgia, U.S.
- Elevation: 1,000 feet (305 m) AMSL
- Established: 1904; 122 years ago
- Type: Private
- Total holes: 18
- Tournaments: The Tour Championship; Ryder Cup (1963); U.S. Amateur
- Website: eastlakegolfclub.com

East Lake Golf Course
- Designed by: Tom Bendelow (1908); Donald Ross (1913); George Cobb (1959 renovation); Rees Jones (1995 & 2008 renovation); Andrew Green (2023 renovation)
- Par: 72/70
- Length: 7,346 yards (6,717 m)
- Course rating: 76.2
- Slope rating: 144
- Course record: 60 – Zach Johnson (2007)
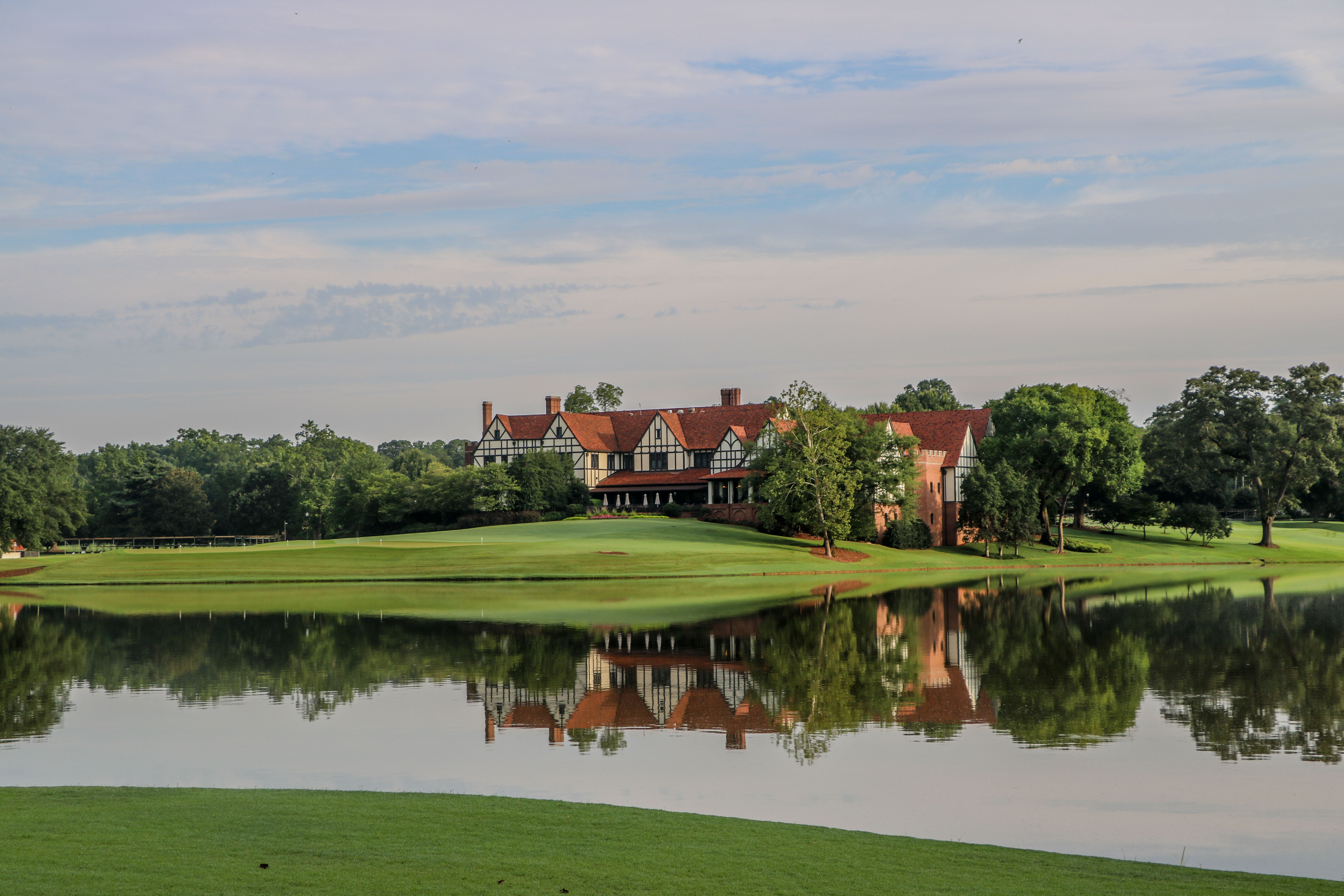
- East Lake Golf Club in 2017

East Lake Golf Club is a private golf club in the southeastern United States in Atlanta, Georgia, located five miles (8 km) east of downtown. Established 122 years ago in 1904, it is the oldest course in the city. East Lake was the home course of golf legend Bobby Jones and much of its clubhouse serves as a tribute to his accomplishments.

Since 2004, East Lake has been the permanent home of the Tour Championship, the culminating event of the PGA Tour Playoffs for the FedEx Cup. The Tour Championship was first played at the course in 1998. The reigning Tour Championship and FedEx Cup champion is Tommy Fleetwood.

All proceeds from operations at East Lake Golf Club—more than $20 million to date—go to support the East Lake Foundation, which works to improve public housing projects in the Atlanta area.

== History ==
=== Early years ===
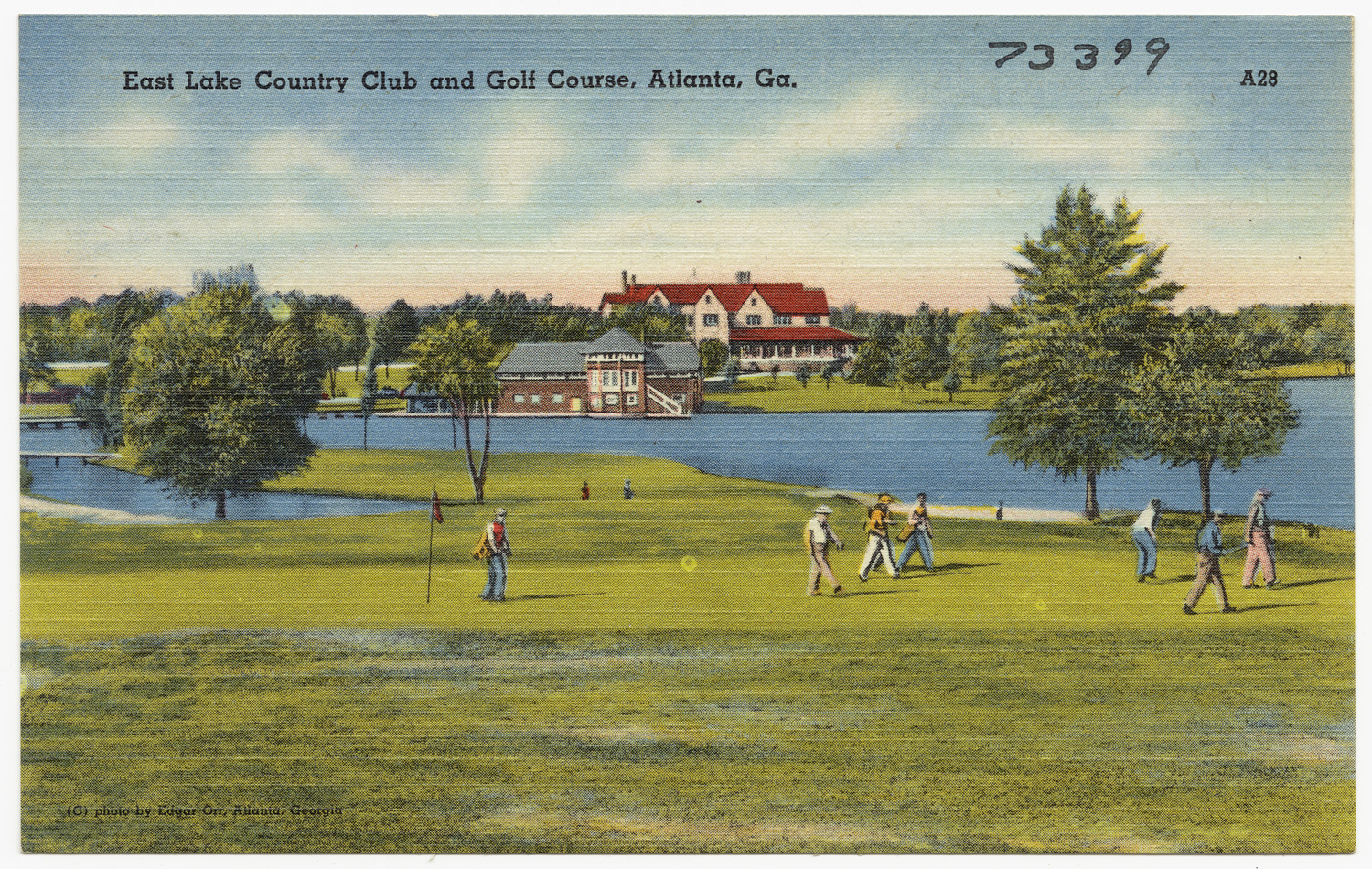
Old postcard of the course at East Lake.

The Atlanta Athletic Club (AAC) was formed in 1898 and due to its popularity it gained 700 members in only four years. The director of the club's athletic program was John Heisman, the famous football coach for whom the Heisman Trophy is named. In 1904 the AAC bought property at East Lake to build a country club which included a golf course. Course architect Tom Bendelow was asked to lay out the course.

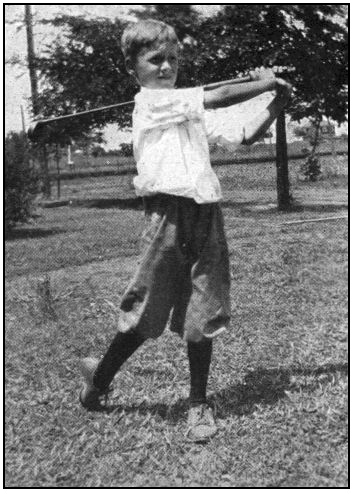
Bobby Jones age 9 shown playing golf at his home course at East Lake.

The course's first holes were built in 1906 and were initially only seven holes, then nine. In the summer of 1907, the course was expanded to 17 holes, and later that year the 18th hole was built to complete it. Also in 1907, the first significant tournament was hosted at East Lake, the Southern Amateur, won by Nelson Whitney. In 1908, Tom Bendelow opened his "No. 2" course at East Lake.

In 1913, famed golf course architect Donald Ross redesigned the course at East Lake. The new plan provided for each of the nine holes to conclude at the clubhouse. Ross also redesigned the No. 2 course in 1928.

A tragic fire destroyed the original clubhouse at East Lake in 1925. Following the fire, famed architect Philip Shutze, who is known for constructing the famous Swan House in Buckhead, was hired by the club to build East Lake's present day two-story Tudor style clubhouse.

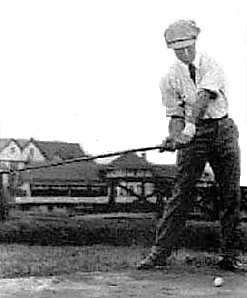
Stewart Maiden golfing at East Lake

Golfer Bobby Jones is said to have played his first and last games of golf at East Lake. Jones won golf's Grand Slam in 1930, claiming the U.S. Amateur, U.S. Open, British Amateur and British Open titles in the same year. Jones's father, "Colonel" Robert P. Jones, served as the president of East Lake from 1937–42 and as a director for 38 years. Bobby Jones himself also served as president of East Lake from 1946–47.

Other notable East Lake players around the same time were amateurs Watts Gunn, Perry Adair, Charlie Yates and Alexa Stirling Fraser many of whom were assisted by East Lake's golf professional Stewart Maiden.

In 1963, East Lake hosted the 15th biennial Ryder Cup where Arnold Palmer served as the playing captain of the winning US Team.

=== Redevelopment ===
East Lake began a downward slope when the surrounding neighborhood deteriorated in the 1960s and became victim to suburban flight. The Atlanta Athletic Club became a part of this when it sold the No. 2 course to developers and moved to its current home in Johns Creek. The original course and clubhouse were saved by a group of 25 members, led by Atlanta businessman Paul Grigsby, who purchased them and created East Lake Country Club in 1968.

In 1970, the East Lake Meadows public housing project was built on the site of the No. 2 golf course and became a center for poverty, drugs and violence. Middle-income homeowners fled the surrounding neighborhood, replaced by low-income renters. By the 1980s, East Lake became a mostly forgotten golf course in a seemingly hopeless neighborhood.

This all changed in 1993 when a local charitable foundation headed by Tom Cousins purchased East Lake with the intent to restore it as a tribute to Bobby Jones and the club's other great amateur golfers. The East Lake Foundation was also created and has used the renovation as a catalyst for revitalizing the surrounding community.

In 1994, Rees Jones, son of golf course architect Robert Trent Jones, restored Donald Ross' original golf course design at East Lake to its current layout.

In 1998 the Tour Championship was hosted at East Lake for the first time. In 2005 East Lake was named the permanent home of the Tour Championship. East Lake has hosted the tournament 23 times since 1998.

The clubhouse was significantly expanded in 2008 with a 20,000 square foot addition designed to match the existing 1926 structure. The manufacturer of the original B. Mifflin Hood roof tiles had gone out of business in the 1940s, but they were recreated by Ludowici. Construction began in February of that year and was completed by the Tour championship that September.

== Today ==
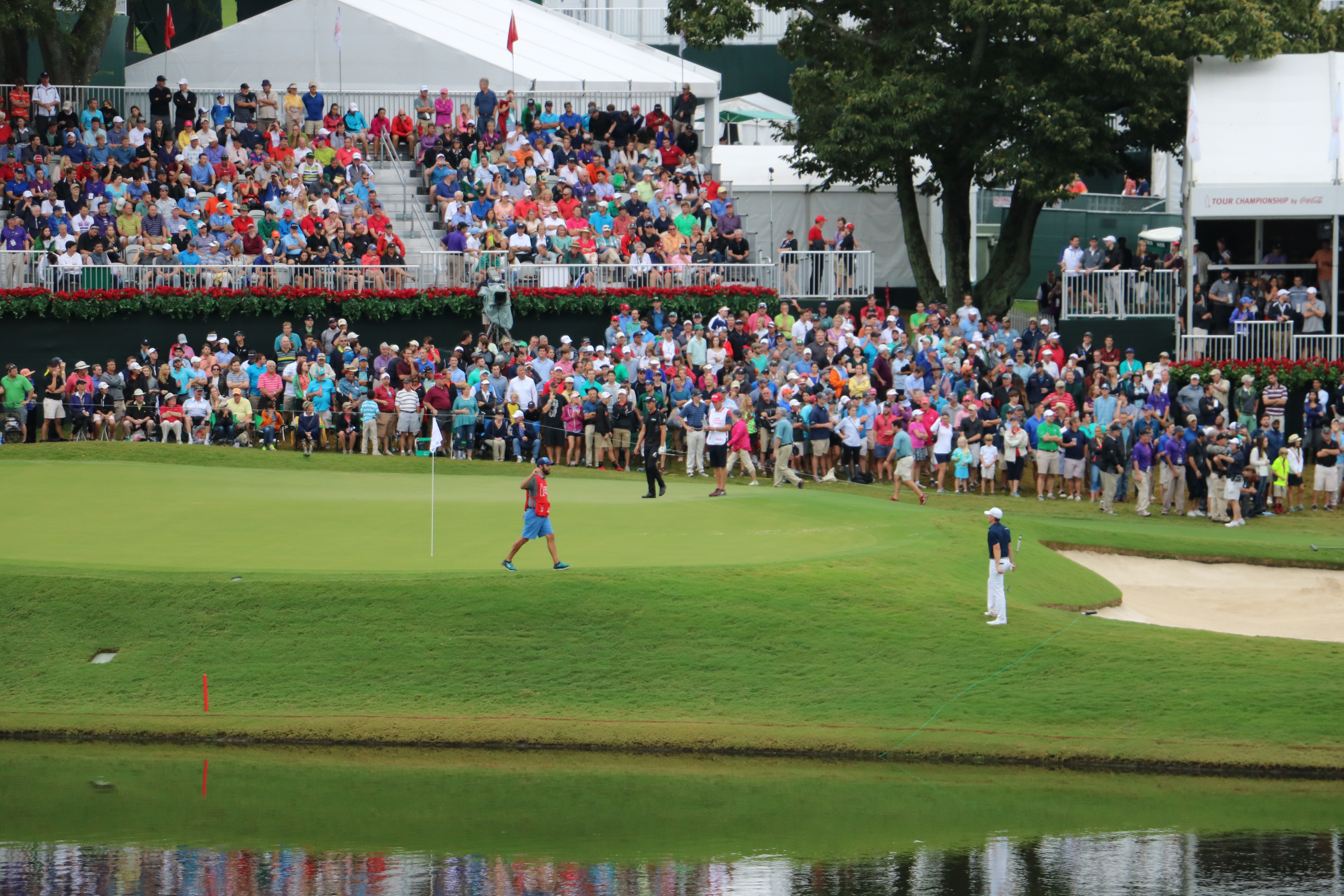
Jordan Spieth and Henrik Stenson on the 17th Green during the 2015 Tour Championship

=== Golf with a Purpose ===
All of the profits from East Lake Golf Club go to support the East Lake Foundation which in turn helps to support the health, education, safety and productivity of the East Lake neighborhood. Because of this, East Lake Golf Club's motto is "Golf with a Purpose".

Based on the success of the East Lake model, a new organization, Purpose Built Communities, was established in 2009 to help fight concentrated segments of poverty in communities throughout the United States. Today, Purpose Built Communities is present in 14 cities in the US.

=== Charlie Yates Golf Course ===
In 1998 East Lake's No. 2 golf course was transformed into the Charlie Yates Golf Course, a 9-hole "executive" public course that provides golf education to children living in the city of Atlanta. The course was rated one of the top 10 short range courses in America by Golf Range Magazine and all profits from the course go to benefit the East Lake Foundation.

Charlie Yates was an East Lake golfer who won the British Amateur at Royal Troon Golf Club in 1938. Charlie grew up on Second Avenue, the street which separated East Lake's main course from its No. 2 course. His boyhood hero was Bobby Jones, whom he knew and played with on the course at East Lake.

=== The Tour Championship ===
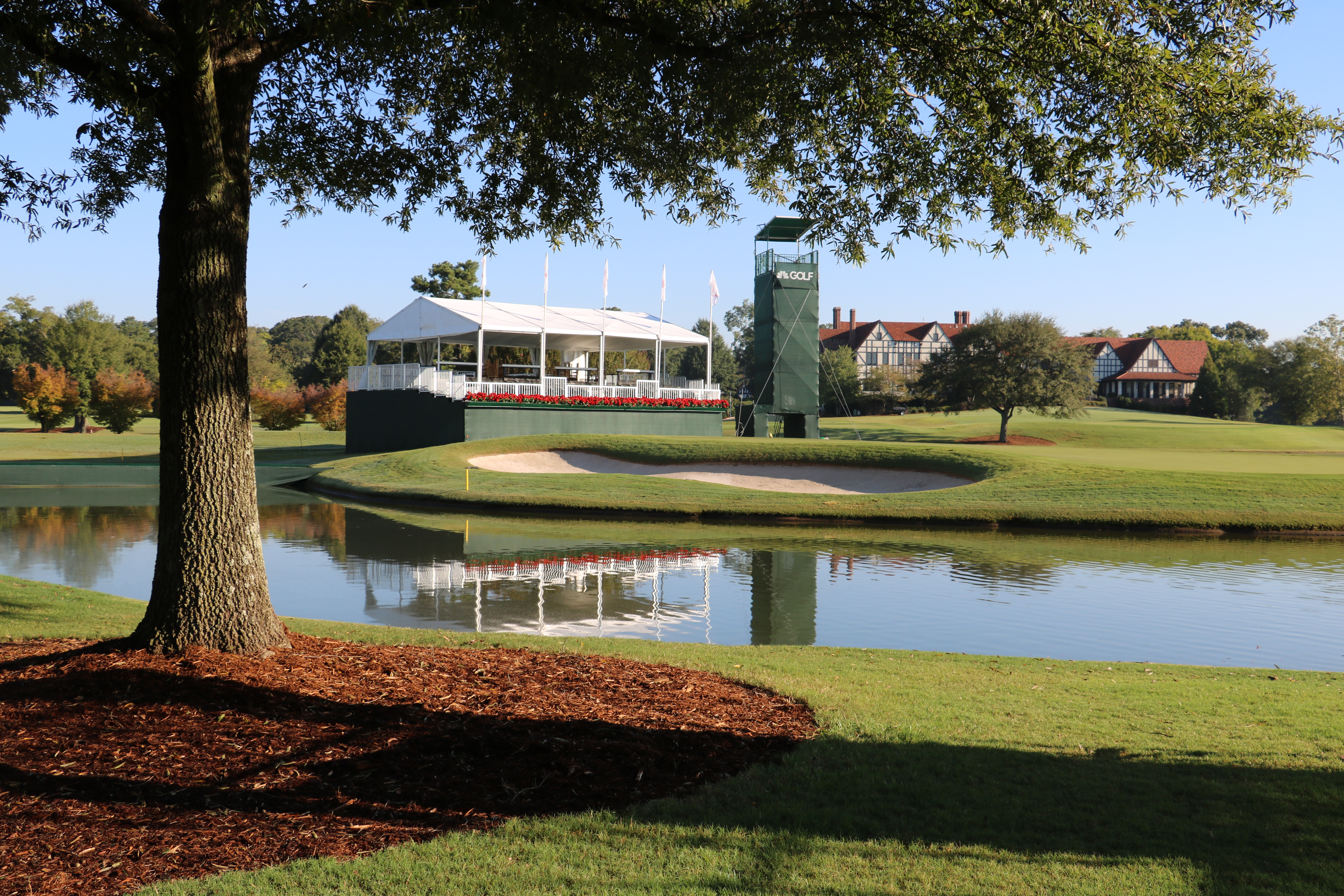
East Lake Golf Club is home to the Tour Championship

Since 2004 East Lake Golf Club has been the permanent location of the Tour Championship, the finale of the PGA Tour Playoffs and the FedEx Cup. The Tour Championship is also one of the largest supporters of the East Lake Foundation.

=== East Lake Cup ===
In May 2015 it was announced that East Lake would be the site of a new collegiate golf tournament, the East Lake Cup. In partnership with the Golf Channel the East Lake Cup invites the top men's and women's teams from the previous season to compete in a match play championship each November. The tournament is broadcast on the Golf Channel. The inaugural East Lake Cup was played November 2 and 3, 2015. The champions of the first year's tournament were Illinois (men's) and USC (women's).

The 2016 the tournament added a day of stroke play to the competition with Illinois winning on the men's side and Duke winning on the women's side. The men's and women's winners of the 2017 East Lake Cup were respectively Vanderbilt University and the University of Southern California. The 2018 winner's were Auburn for the men's side and USC on the women's side.

=== Creator Classic ===
The first Creator Classic took place at East Lake, as well as the fourth such event. Luke Kwon won the first Creator Classic at the golf course and Brad Dalke won the next such event at the course.

== Course ==
=== Course records ===
- Par 70 – Zach Johnson, 60 (−10) on September 15, 2007, at the Tour Championship, set at 7,154 yards (6,542 m).
- Par 72 – Robert "Bullet" Godfrey, 63 (−9) on August 20, 2001 at the U.S. Amateur after bogeying the final two holes. The course's length was 7,267 yards (6,645 m).

=== Scorecard ===
East Lake Golf Club
Tee	Rating/Slope	1	2	3	4	5	6	7	8	9	Out	10	11	12	13	14	15	16	17	18	In	Total
Black	74.0/137	469	197	391	479	442	525	481	455	235	3,674	424	214	389	440	520	211	454	430	590	3,672	7,346
Blue	72.2/132	465	170	369	366	403	471	418	373	207	3,242	394	164	372	387	526	150	365	322	530	3,210	6,452
Green	69.1/125	421	147	345	317	399	456	397	332	167	2,981	394	140	325	350	475	130	333	304	455	2,906	5,887
Gold	66.4/121	415	136	319	317	365	414	371	267	110	2,714	329	105	247	342	383	94	288	255	448	2,491	5,205
Par		4	3	4	4	4	5	4	4	3	35	4	3	4	4	4	3	4	4	5	35	70
SI		6	18	14	12	4	10	2	8	16		7	17	11	3	9	15	1	13	5

== Tournaments hosted ==
East Lake has hosted many prestigious tournaments including:

- The Tour Championship
  - 2025 (England) Tommy Fleetwood
  - 2024 (United States) Scottie Scheffler
  - 2023 (Norway) Viktor Hovland
  - 2022 (Northern Ireland) Rory McIlroy
  - 2021 (United States) Patrick Cantlay
  - 2020 (United States) Dustin Johnson
  - 2019 (Northern Ireland) Rory McIlroy
  - 2018 (United States) Tiger Woods
  - 2017 (United States) Xander Schauffele
  - 2016 (Northern Ireland) Rory McIlroy
  - 2015 (United States) Jordan Spieth
  - 2014 (United States) Billy Horschel
  - 2013 (Sweden) Henrik Stenson
  - 2012 (United States) Brandt Snedeker
  - 2011 (United States) Bill Haas
  - 2010 (United States) Jim Furyk
  - 2009 (United States) Phil Mickelson
  - 2008 (Colombia) Camilo Villegas
  - 2007 (United States) Tiger Woods
  - 2006 (Australia) Adam Scott
  - 2005 (United States) Bart Bryant
  - 2004 (South Africa) Retief Goosen
  - 2002 (Fiji) Vijay Singh
  - 2000 (United States) Phil Mickelson
  - 1998 (United States) Hal Sutton
- East Lake Cup
  - 2018 Auburn University men and University of Southern California women
    - Individual medalists: Viktor Hovland (Oklahoma State University men) and Albane Valenzuela (Stanford University women)
  - 2017 Vanderbilt University men and University of Southern California women
    - Individual medalists: Will Gordon (Vanderbilt University men) and Robynn Ree (University of Southern California women)
  - 2016 University of Illinois men and Duke University women
    - Individual medalists: Scottie Scheffler (University of Texas men) and Andrea Lee (Stanford University women)
  - 2015 University of Illinois men and University of Southern California women
- Ryder Cup
  - 1963 United States
- U.S. Amateur
  - 2001 (United States) Bubba Dickerson
- U.S. Women's Amateur
  - 1950 (United States) Beverly Hanson
- Southern Amateur
  - 1907 Nelson Whitney
  - 1910 F.G. Byrd
  - 1915 Charles Dexter
  - 1922 Bobby Jones
  - 1933 Jack Redmond
  - 2002 Lee Williams
- Other tournaments
  - 1919 Southern Open won by Jim Barnes
  - 1920 Southern Open won by J. Douglas Edgar
  - 1927 Southern Open won by Bobby Jones
  - 1997 Western Junior won by Nick Cassini
