= Eva Davis =

American housing and labor activist (c.1936–2012)

- Born: c. 1936
- Died: June 5, 2012 (aged 76); Atlanta, Georgia, US
- Occupations: Activist, nursing assistant

Eva Belle Favors Davis (c. 1936 – June 5, 2012) was an American housing and labor activist in Atlanta, Georgia, United States.

== East Lake Meadows ==
Davis was a community organizer and advocate for the East Lake Meadows public housing projects, where she lived with her children. She led a group called the United Concerned Citizens of East Lake Meadows and criticized the Atlanta Housing Authority (AHA), which was in charge of maintaining the East Lake Meadows community. In 1972, she supported a probe into the AHA, calling on the Department of Housing and Urban Development to investigate flooded apartments and unsafe construction that violated proper building codes.

Plans for East Lake Meadows housing projects c. 1969

Davis was also president of the neighborhood's tenants' association, and she led rent strikes against the AHA in the 1970s, with the goal of pressuring the agency to address chronic health and safety problems in the projects. In response, the AHA made some improvements to the community, including adding more sidewalks and a daycare center.

In 1979, she led demonstrations at City Hall to protest against discrimination in the Comprehensive Employment and Training Act (CETA). Although the program was designed to offer summer jobs to youths in low income communities, Davis and other protesters said that young people in all-Black public housing projects were mostly ignored.

== 1972 Church's Chicken wildcat strike ==
In May 1972, Davis organized a wildcat strike against a Church's Chicken location in Atlanta. Workers demanded sick leave, overtime pay, fringe benefits, and an increase in their hourly pay—up from $1.60 (equivalent to $12 in 2025). They also wanted an assistant manager to be rehired, after he had been replaced. Davis criticized Church's for refusing to invest in the neighborhood while making over $7,000 (equivalent to $53,878 in 2025) a week from the people in it.

The strike quickly expanded to picketing at multiple Church's Chicken locations throughout the city, forcing some stores to close. Not all workers at other Church's locations could afford to walk off their jobs and join the strikers, but in some cases customers refused to cross the picket line. Labor scholar Augustus Wood writes that "the Church's wildcat strike became a Black working-class symbol for citywide resistance and class solidarity".

In June 1972, a settlement was reached with Church's Chicken, and the company agreed to provide a 10 cent per hour raise. Previously, most employees did not receive employee benefits like sick leave because they were considered part-time. Church's agreed to ensure that no store would have more than two part-time employees, and they also agreed to consider any employee working more than 30 hours per week to be full-time.

== Personal life ==
Davis said that when she was a teenager, she worked on a farm, and she was married when she was 15. She said she struggled to support her family, because Black women like her were underpaid. She moved into the East Lake Meadows housing project in July 1970. The following year, she started organizing her community, saying she wanted to "fight for the rights of the poor people".

When Davis died in 2012, she was survived by three daughters, five sons, 32 grandchildren, and 33 great-grandchildren.
