= Rees Jones =

American golf course architect (born 1941)

- Born: September 16, 1941 (age 84); Montclair, New Jersey
- Other name: The Open Doctor
- Education: Yale University, Harvard University
- Occupation: Architect
- Awards: Old Tom Morris Award (2004); Donald Ross Award (2013); Don A. Rossi Award (2014); New Jersey Sports Writers Association Hall of Fame (2012); Northern California Golf Association Hall of Fame (2015); Golf World Magazine's Golf Architect of the Year (1995); Metropolitan Golf Association Distinguished Service Award (1998); Metropolitan Golf Writers Distinguished Service Award (2002); Robert Moses Master Builder Award (2012); MetGCSA's John Reid Lifetime Achievement Award (2016)
- Practice: Golf Course Design
- Projects: Nantucket Golf Club, Siasconset, MA; TPC Danzante Bay, Loreto, MX; Ocean Forest Golf Club, Sea Island, GA; Bethpage Black Course, Farmingdale, NY; Cascata Golf Club, Boulder City, NV; RedStick Golf Club Vero Beach, FL; Atlantic Golf Club, Bridgehampton, NY; The Bridge, Bridgehampton, NY
- Website: reesjonesinc.com

Rees Jones (born September 16, 1941) is an American golf course architect.

== Life and career ==
Born and raised in Montclair, New Jersey, the son of legendary golf course designer Robert Trent Jones and the younger brother of golf course designer Robert Trent Jones, Jr., he attended Montclair High School.

His first exposure to golf course design came as a boy when he would accompany his father surveying courses. After attending Yale and graduate studies at Harvard University Graduate School of Design, he joined his father and older brother at Robert Trent Jones Incorporated. He helped his father on numerous courses until forming his own firm in 1974. He has designed, renovated, or restored over 260 golf courses in his career.

Jones continues to design courses and currently lives in Juno Beach, Florida and has his offices in Montclair, New Jersey. Jones has earned the moniker "The Open Doctor" for his work in preparation for numerous major championships. He has also served as the president of the American Society of Golf Course Architects. A noted environmentalist, he has been a vocal champion for the cause of environmentally friendly golf courses.

Jones received the 2004 Old Tom Morris Award from the Golf Course Superintendents Association of America, GCSAA's highest honor.

== Golf Course Design ==
Rees Jones founded the golf course design firm of Rees Jones, Inc., located in his hometown of Montclair, New Jersey in 1974. He was later joined by golf course architect Keith Evans. In 1984 Greg Muirhead (ASGCA) joined the team followed by Steve Weisser (ASGCA) in 1991 and Bryce Swanson (ASGCA) in 2000.

== Courses designed ==
=== With Robert Trent Jones Incorporated ===
- Montauk Downs, Long Island, New York (1968)
- Ocean Pines, Maryland(1971)
- Turnberry Isle, Florida (1972)

=== With Rees Jones Incorporated ===
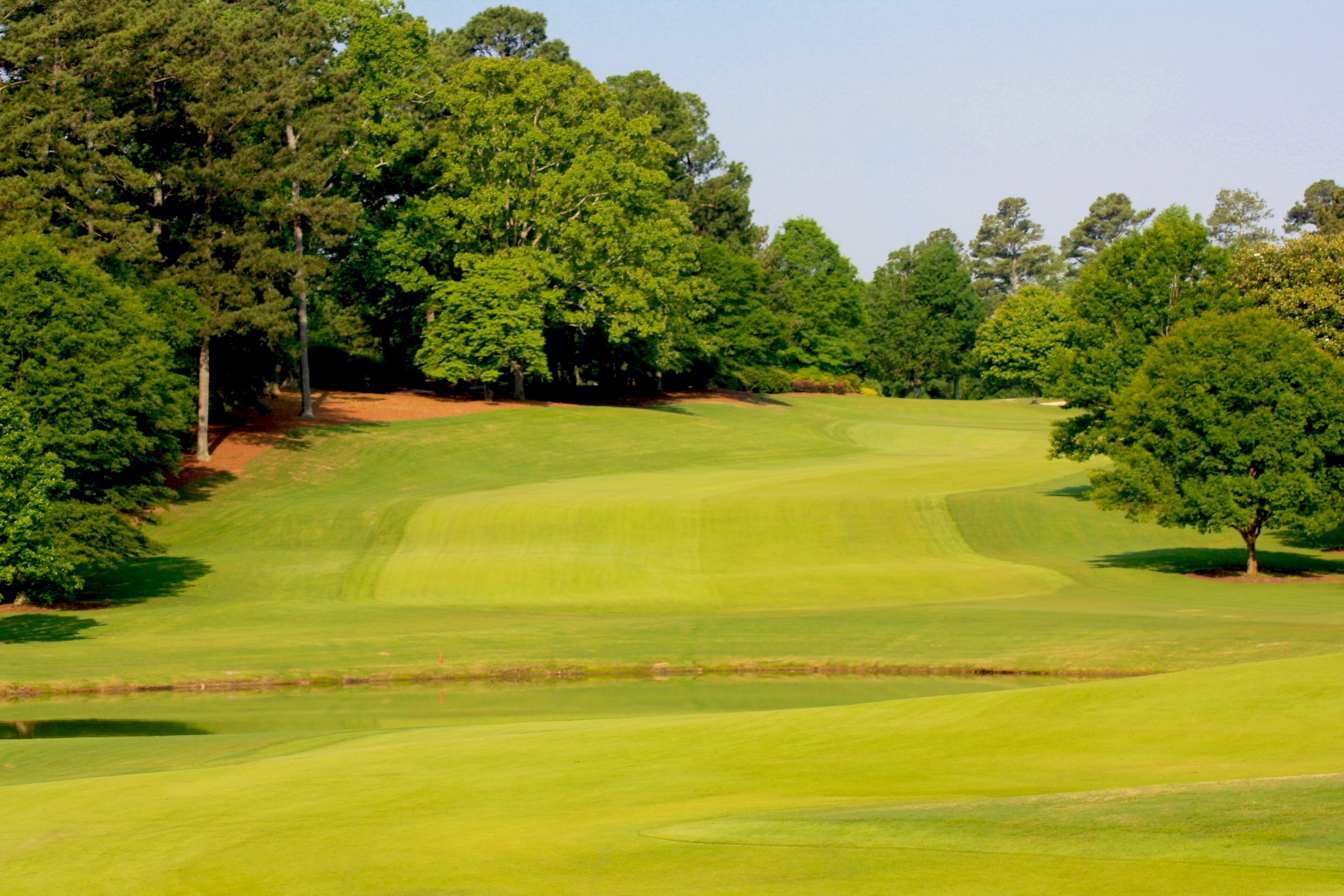
View of No. 18 Fairway at East Lake Golf Club.

• Dacotah Ridge 2000 Morton Mn

- El Caballero Country Club, Tarzana, California (2021 Redesign) Originally designed by Robert Trent Jones in 1964

°Shoreline Golf Course, 1100 Pelican Road, New Bern, NC (1972)-Treasure Cove

- Arcadian Shores, Myrtle Beach, South Carolina (1974)
- Graysburg Hills Golf Course [Chuckey, Tennessee] (1978)
- Bear Creek, Hilton Head Island, SC (1980)
- Black Hawk Country Club, Richmond, TX (1999)
- Marriott's Griffin Gate, Lexington, Kentucky (1981)
- Haig Point Club, Daufuskie Island, South Carolina (1986)
- Pinehurst #7, Pinehurst, North Carolina (1986)
- Carmel Country Club, South Course Charlotte, North Carolina (1988, 2009) – redesign
- The Country Club, Brookline, Massachusetts (1988) – restoration
- Cherry Valley Country Club, Skillman, New Jersey (1991)
- Duke University Golf Course, Durham, North Carolina (1993, 2021) – renovation
- Talamore Golf Resort, Southern Pines, North Carolina (1991)
- Gleneagles at the Equinox, Manchester, Vermont (1992) – reconstruction
- Atlantic, Bridgehampton, New York (1992)
- Sandpines, Florence, Oregon (1992)
- The Oxfordshire Golf Club, Thame, Oxfordshire, England (1993)
- Huntsville, Wilkes-Barre, Pennsylvania (1994)
- LPGA International Champions, Daytona Beach, Florida (1994)
- Legend Trail, Scottsdale, Arizona (1995)
- Ocean Forest, Sea Island, Georgia (1995)
- Atlanta Athletic Club – Highlands Course, Duluth, Georgia (1995) – redesign
- East Lake Golf Club, Atlanta, Georgia (1995) – reconstruction
- Ballantyne Country Club, Charlotte, North Carolina (1995)
- Poppy Ridge, Livermore, California (1996)
- Lake Merced Golf Club, Daly City, California (1996) – reconstruction
- The Currituck Club, Corolla, North Carolina (1996)
- Charlie Yates Golf Course, Atlanta, Georgia (1998)
- Greenville Country Club (Chanticleer), Greenville, SC (2002) – redesign
- Royal Oaks Golf Club, Moncton New Brunswick, Canada (2000)
- Black Lake Golf Course, Onaway, Michigan (2000)
- Thousand Oaks Golf Club, Grand Rapids, Michigan (2000)
- Old Chatham Golf Club, Durham, North Carolina (2001)
- Torrey Pines Golf Course, La Jolla, California (2001) – reconstruction
- The Golf Club at Briar's Creek, Johns Island, South Carolina (2002) – Golf Digest's voted Best New Private Course in America
- Quintero Golf Club(Founders Course) Peoria, Arizona (2002)
- The Oconee, Reynolds Plantation, Greensboro, Georgia (2002)
- Baker Hill, Newbury, New Hampshire (2003) – Golf Digest's voted Best Course in New Hampshire
- Breakers Hotel Rees Jones Course, West Palm Beach, Florida (2004) – reconstruction
- Royal Montreal Golf Course, Blue Course (2004)
- Bellerive Country Club, St. Louis, Missouri (2006) – reconstruction
- Cog Hill Golf & Country Club Dubsdread Course No. 4 Lemont, Illinois – restoration
- Oakland Hills Country Club, Bloomfield Hills, Michigan, South Course
- Baton Rouge Country Club, Baton Rouge, Louisiana – reconstruction
- Stoney Creek Golf Course, Nellysford, Virginia – 27 holes
- Broad Run Golfer's Club, West Bradford Township, Pennsylvania
- Grand Niagara Rees Jones Course, Niagara Falls, Ontario, Canada
- Lakewood Country Club, Rockville, Maryland
- Golden Horseshoe Golf Club – Green Course, Williamsburg, Virginia
- Red Stick, Vero Beach, Florida
- The Lambton Golf and Country Club, Toronto, Ontario, Canada
- Piedmont Driving Club, Atlanta, Georgia (2000)
- Santaluz, San Diego, California
- Golden Hills Golf Club, Ocala, Florida – redesign
- Waldorf Astoria Golf Club, Orlando, Florida (2009)
- Falcon's Fire Golf Club, Kissimmee, Fl
- Blackstone National Golf Club, Sutton, MA
- Hell's Point Golf Club, Virginia Beach, VA (1982)
- Greenbrier Country Club, Chesapeake, VA (1987)
- Honey Bee Golf Club, Virginia Beach, VA (1988)
- Bethpage State Park, Black Course, Farmingdale, NY (2015) – design changes
- Charleston National Golf Club, Mount Pleasant, SC
- Club at Viniterra, New Kent, VA (2009)
- Carolina Country Club, Raleigh, NC (2016)
- Totteridge Golf Course, Greensburg, PA (2001)
