= Charlie Yates =

American golfer (1913–2005)

Personal information
- Full name: Charles Richardson Yates
- Nationality: United States
- Born: September 9, 1913 Atlanta, Georgia, U.S.
- Died: October 17, 2005 (aged 92) Atlanta, Georgia, U.S.

Career
- Sport: Golf
- College: Georgia Tech
- Status: Amateur

Best results in major championships (wins: 1)
- Masters Tournament: T17: 1940
- PGA Championship: DNP
- U.S. Open: T50: 1934
- The Open Championship: DNP
- British Amateur: Won: 1938

Achievements and awards
- Bob Jones Award: 1980
- Georgia Golf Hall of Fame: 1989

Charles Richardson Yates (September 9, 1913 – October 17, 2005) was an American amateur golfer. He is noted for winning the 1938 Amateur Championship, captaining the United States Walker Cup team and being the long-time Secretary of Augusta National Golf Club.

== Biography ==
Yates was born in Atlanta, Georgia on September 9, 1913 and was raised in a home near East Lake Golf Club's 4th green. Yates won the Georgia State Amateur in 1931 and 1932. In 1934, he won the NCAA individual title. The following year, he won the Western Amateur. The Georgia Tech star became an international name in golf in 1938 when he won The Amateur Championship. In 1936 and 1938, he played on the U.S. Walker Cup Team. He was captain of the 1953 Walker Cup Team, and was named honorary captain in 1985. Five times in his competitive career, Yates, secretary of the Augusta National Golf Club, was the low scoring amateur in the Masters Tournament. In 1980, Charlie was presented with the Bob Jones Award by the United States Golf Association. Yates was inducted into the Georgia Golf Hall of Fame on January 14, 1989.

== Charlie Yates Golf Course ==
Today, East Lake Golf Club's old number two golf course, Charlie Yates Golf Course, is named after Yates. Yates grew up on Second Avenue, the street which separated East Lake's main course from its No. 2 course. His boyhood hero was Bobby Jones whom he knew and played with on the course at East Lake.

== Amateur wins ==
this list may be incomplete

- 1931 Georgia Amateur
- 1932 Georgia Amateur
- 1934 NCAA Championship (individual)
- 1935 Western Amateur
- 1938 The Amateur Championship

== U.S. national team appearances ==
- Walker Cup: 1936 (winners), 1938, 1953 (winners, non-playing captain)
