= Watts Gunn =

American amateur golfer (1995–1994)

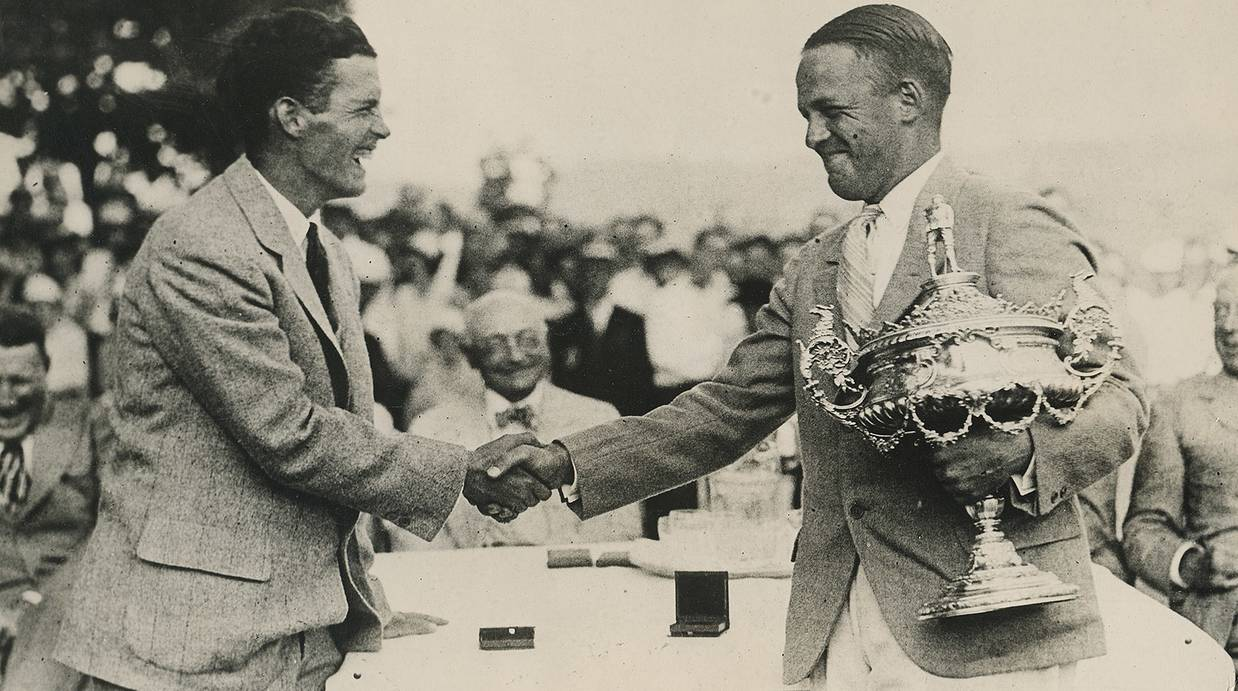
- Gunn (left) with Bobby Jones in 1925.

Personal information
- Nationality: United States
- Born: January 11, 1905 Macon, Georgia, U.S.
- Died: November 5, 1994 (aged 89)

Career
- Sport: Golf
- College: Georgia Tech
- Status: Amateur

Best results in major championships
- Masters Tournament: DNP
- PGA Championship: DNP
- U.S. Open: 42nd: 1927
- The Open Championship: CUT: 1926
- U.S. Amateur: 2nd: 1925
- British Amateur: T17: 1926

Achievements and awards
- Georgia Golf Hall of Fame: (1989)

Watts Gunn (January 11, 1905 – November 5, 1994) was an American amateur golfer. He had a long golf career that began in his high school days at Lanier High School in Macon, Georgia. He went on to become a successful player in college at Georgia Tech when he was twice the winner of the Georgia Amateur, in 1923 and 1927. He won a number of other events in his career as well.

== Early life ==
Gunn was born in Macon, Georgia, on January 11, 1905.

== Golf career ==
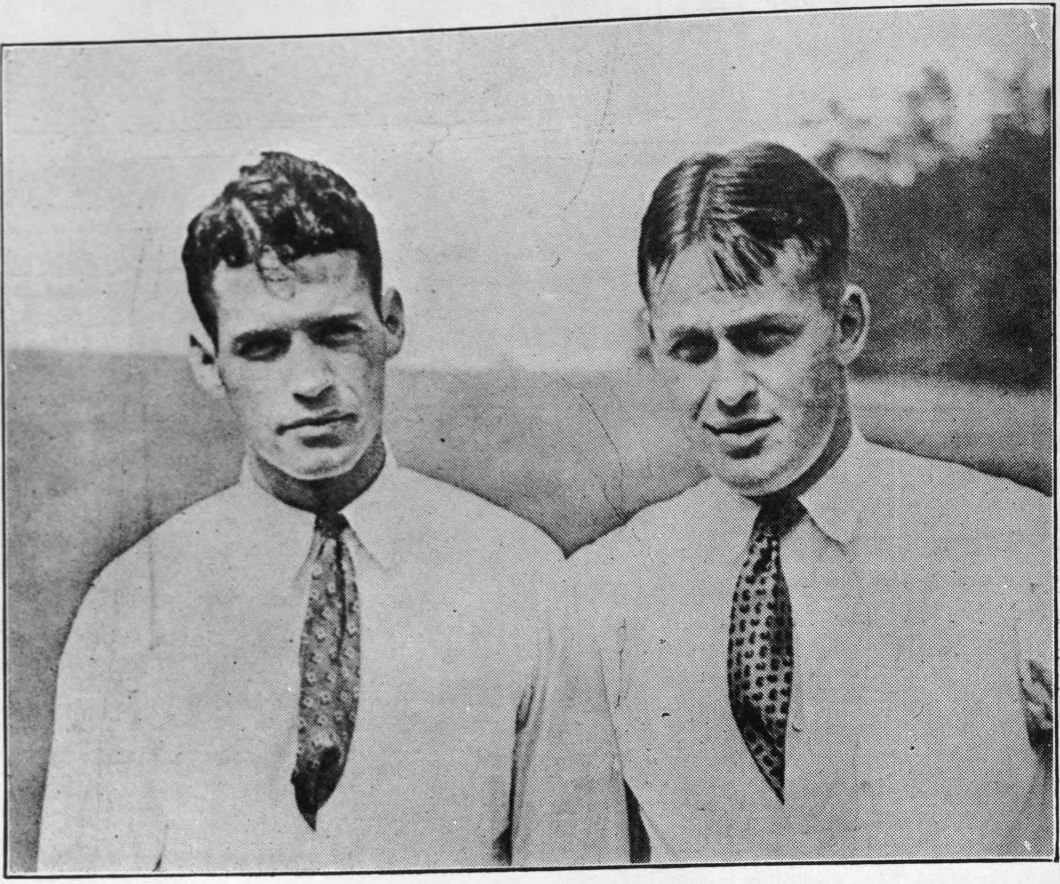
Gunn (left) with Bobby Jones in 1925

Gunn became a member of the Atlanta Athletic Club's East Lake Golf Club in the mid-1920s while a student at Georgia Tech. At East Lake, he took lessons from James Maiden. Gunn's first major tournament win was in the 1923 Georgia Amateur. At the 1925 U.S. Amateur, played at Oakmont Country Club, Gunn won 15 straight holes in the first round of the 36-hole match. In that tournament, he went to the finals and lost against friend and rival Bobby Jones, marking the only time two players from the same club ever met for the U.S. Amateur crown.

=== Georgia Amateur ===
Gunn won the Georgia Amateur title again in 1927. In 1927, he won the Southern and National Intercollegiate tournaments, and the following year he won the Southern Amateur and the Southern Open. Gunn was a member of the United States Walker Cup teams in 1926 and 1928, winning all four of his matches. He later served as president of the Atlanta Athletic Club from 1953 to 1954.

== Death and legacy ==
Gunn died on November 5, 1994. He was inducted into the Georgia Golf Hall of Fame on January 14, 1989. He is best remembered for winning the Georgia Amateur twice, in 1924 and again in 1927.

== Amateur wins ==
Note: This list may be incomplete

- 1923 Georgia Amateur
- 1927 Georgia Amateur, Southern Intercollegiate, NCAA Championship
- 1928 Southern Amateur
