= List of American Curtis Cup golfers =

This is a list of all the American golfers who have played in the Curtis Cup through 2026.

== Players ==
| Player | Editions |
|---|---|
| Roberta Albers | 1968 |
| Danielle Ammaccapane | 1986 |
| Amy Anderson | 2012 |
| Amari Avery | 2022 |
| Meriam Bailey | 1958^ |
| Barbara Barrow | 1976 |
| Beth Barry | 1972, 1974 |
| Emily Glaser (Bastel) | 2002 |
| Elizabeth Bauer | 1998, 2000 |
| Laura Baugh | 1972 |
| Leland Beckel | 2000 |
| Judy Bell | 1960, 1962 |
| Peggy Bell (Kirk) | 1950 |
| Amy Benz | 1982 |
| Patty Berg | 1936, 1938 |
| Erica Blasberg | 2004 |
| Amanda Blumenherst | 2006, 2008 |
| Barbara Fay Boddie (White) | 1964, 1966 |
| Meghan Bolger | 2008 |
| Jane Booth (Bastanchury) | 1970, 1972, 1974 |
| Kellee Booth | 1996, 1998 |
| Sierra Brooks | 2016 |
| Mary Budke | 1974 |
| Robin Burke | 1998 |
| Brandie Burton | 1990 |
| Zoe Campos | 2024 |
| JoAnne Carner (Gunderson) | 1958, 1960, 1962, 1964 |
| Lori Castillo | 1980 |
| Jensen Castle | 2021, 2022 |
| Leona Cheney (Pressler) | 1932, 1934, 1936 |
| Jenny Chuasiriporn | 1998 |
| Cydney Clanton | 2010 |
| Peggy Conley | 1964, 1968 |
| Patricia Cornett-Iker | 1978, 1988 |
| Allisen Corpuz | 2021 |
| Jean Crawford (Ashley) | 1962, 1966, 1968 |
| Paula Creamer | 2004 |
| Clifford Ann Creed | 1962 |
| Carolyn Cudone | 1956 |
| Beth Daniel | 1976, 1978 |
| Anna Davis | 2024, 2026 |
| Mary Lou Dill | 1968 |
| Claire Doran | 1952, 1954 |
| Mary Ann Downey | 1956 |
| Lindy Duncan | 2012 |
| Meredith Duncan | 2002 |
| Alice Dye | 1970 |
| Austin Ernst | 2012 |
| Mollie Fankhauser | 2002 |
| Heather Farr | 1984 |
| Jane Fassinger | 1970 |
| Mary Lena Faulk | 1954 |
| Carol Flenniken (Sorenson) | 1964, 1966 |
| Amy Fruhwirth | 1992 |
| Mariel Galdiano | 2016, 2018 |
| Megha Ganne | 2022 |
| Kim Gardner | 1986 |
| Kristen Gillman | 2018 |
| Charlotte Glutting | 1934, 1936, 1938 |
| Vicki Goetze | 1990, 1992 |
| Brenda Goldsmith | 1978, 1980 |
| Aniela Goldthwaite | 1934, 1936^ |
| Joanne Goodwin | 1960 |
| Melanie Green | 2024 |
| Virginia Grimes (Derby) | 1998, 2000, 2006 |
| Kathy Guadagnino (Baker) | 1982 |
| Mary Hafeman | 1980 |
| Nancy Hager | 1970 |
| Shelley Hamlin | 1968, 1970 |
| Penny Hammel | 1984 |
| Cathy Hanlon | 1982 |
| Beverly Hanson | 1950 |
| Tracy Hanson | 1992 |
| Patricia Harbottle (Lesser) | 1954, 1956 |
| Leigh Anne Hardin | 2002 |
| Mina Harigae | 2008 |
| Rachel Heck | 2021, 2022 |
| Kathryn Hemphill | 1938 |
| Helen Hicks | 1932 |
| Dorothy Higbie | 1932^ |
| Carolyn Hill | 1978 |
| Cindy Hill | 1970, 1974, 1976, 1978 |
| Opal Hill | 1932, 1934, 1936 |
| Kary Hollenbaugh | 2026 |
| Marion Hollins | 1932^ |
| Hilary Homeyer | 2000 |
| Dana Howe | 1984 |
| Sarah Huarte | 2004 |
| Sarah Ingram (LeBrun) | 1992, 1994, 1996 |
| Juli Inkster (Simpson) | 1982 |
| Liz Janangelo | 2004 |
| Angela Jerman | 2002 |
| Tiffany Joh | 2008 |
| Jennifer Johnson | 2010 |
| Ann Casey Johnstone | 1958, 1960, 1962 |
| Wendy Kaupp | 1994 |
| Stephanie Keever | 2000 |
| Caroline Keggi | 1988 |
| Tracy Kerdyk | 1988 |
| Cristie Kerr | 1996 |
| Kandi Kessler-Comer | 1986 |
| Dorothy Kielty | 1948, 1950 |
| Gina Kim | 2021 |
| Kimberly Kim | 2008, 2010 |
| Kyung Kim | 2014 |
| Dorothy Kirby | 1948, 1950, 1952, 1954 |
| Martha Kirouac (Wilkinson) | 1970, 1972 |
| Emilee Klein | 1994 |
| Stephanie Kono | 2010 |
| Jasmine Koo | 2024, 2026 |
| Jessica Korda | 2010 |
| Brenda Kuehn (Corrie) | 1996, 1998 |
| Rachel Kuehn | 2021, 2022, 2024 |
| Kelli Kuehne | 1996 |
| Jennifer Kupcho | 2018 |
| Brittany Lang | 2004 |
| Martha Lang | 1992 |
| Bonnie Lauer | 1974 |
| Alison Lee | 2014 |
| Andrea Lee | 2016, 2018 |
| Erynne Lee | 2014 |
| Jennie Lee | 2006, 2008 |
| Grace Lenczyk | 1948, 1950 |
| Taylor Leon | 2006 |
| Stacy Lewis | 2008 |
| Lucy Li | 2018 |
| Marjorie Lindsay | 1952 |
| Mika Liu | 2016 |
| Nancy Lopez | 1976 |
| Tiffany Lua | 2010, 2012 |
| Paige Mackenzie | 2006 |
| Deborah Massey | 1974, 1976 |
| Brooke Matthews | 2021 |
| Lisa McCloskey | 2012 |
| Amanda McCurdy | 2006 |
| Ally McDonald | 2014 |
| Mari McDougall | 1982 |
| Jill McGill | 1994 |
| Barbara McIntire | 1958, 1960, 1962, 1964, 1966, 1972 |
| Emilia Migliaccio | 2021, 2022 |
| Marion Miley | 1934^, 1936^, 1938 |
| Terri Moody | 1980 |
| Mae Murray | 1952 |
| Laura Myerscough | 2002 |
| Karen Noble | 1990 |
| Farah O'Keefe | 2026 |
| Judy Oliver | 1978, 1980, 1982 |
| Maureen Orcutt (Crews) | 1932, 1934, 1936, 1938 |
| Hannah O'Sullivan | 2016 |
| Patricia O'Sullivan | 1952 |
| Joanne Pacillo | 1984 |
| Estelle Page (Lawson) | 1938, 1948 |
| Brooke Pancake | 2012 |
| Annie Park | 2014 |
| Catherine Park | 2024 |
| Jane Park | 2004, 2006 |
| Dottie Pepper | 1986 |
| Katie Peterson | 1990 |
| Margaret Platt | 1990 |
| Erica Popson | 2012 |
| Ellen Port | 1994, 1996 |
| Dorothy Porter (Germain) | 1950 |
| Phyllis Preuss | 1962, 1964, 1966, 1968, 1970 |
| Ashlan Ramsey | 2014 |
| Anne Richardson | 1958^ |
| Polly Riley | 1948, 1950, 1952, 1954, 1956, 1958 |
| Jo Jo Robertson | 1998 |
| Lucille Robinson | 1934 |
| Barbara Romack | 1954, 1956, 1958 |
| Kiara Romero | 2026 |
| Jody Rosenthal | 1984 |
| Anne Sander (Quast) | 1958, 1960, 1962, 1966, 1968, 1974, 1984, 1990 |
| Megan Schofill | 2024 |
| Cindy Scholefield | 1988 |
| Cindy Schreyer | 1986 |
| Sophia Schubert | 2018 |
| Kathleen Scrivner (McCarthy) | 1986, 1988 |
| Leslie Shannon | 1986, 1988, 1992 |
| Patty Sheehan | 1980 |
| Pearl Sinn | 1988 |
| Grace DeMoss Smith (DeMoss) | 1952, 1954 |
| Lancy Smith | 1972, 1978, 1980, 1982, 1984 |
| Wiffi Smith | 1956 |
| Jennifer Song | 2010 |
| Stephanie Sparks | 1994 |
| Mariah Stackhouse | 2014 |
| Hollis Stacy | 1972 |
| Angela Stanford | 2000 |
| Lauren Stephenson | 2018 |
| Latanna Stone | 2022 |
| Judy Street (Eller) | 1960 |
| Louise Suggs | 1948 |
| Jenny Suh | 2006 |
| Courtney Swaim | 2002 |
| Nancy Syms (Roth) | 1964, 1966, 1976 |
| Asterisk Talley | 2024, 2026 |
| Emma Talley | 2014 |
| Bailey Tardy | 2016 |
| Lexi Thompson | 2010 |
| Carol Thompson (Semple) | 1974, 1976, 1980, 1982, 1988, 1990, 1992, 1994, 1996, 1998, 2000, 2002 |
| Annie Thurman | 2004 |
| Emily Tubert | 2012 |
| Noreen Uihlein | 1978 |
| Virginia Van Wie | 1932, 1934 |
| Glenna Vare (Collett) | 1932, 1936, 1938, 1948 |
| Monica Vaughn | 2016 |
| Lilia Vu | 2018 |
| Alison Walshe | 2008 |
| Wendy Ward | 1994 |
| Avery Weed | 2026 |
| Marla Weeks (Jemsek) | 1996 |
| Jane Weiss (Nelson) | 1956 |
| Robin Weiss | 1990, 1992, 2000 |
| Donna White (Horton) | 1976 |
| Mary Anne Widman | 1984 |
| Michelle Wie | 2004 |
| Kim Williams | 1986 |
| Helen Wilson (Sigel) | 1950, 1966 |
| Bethany Wu | 2016 |
| Kelly Xu | 2026 |
| Rose Zhang | 2021, 2022 |
| Joyce Ziske | 1954 |

^ In the final team but did not play in any matches.

The name in brackets is another surname used by the player.

== See also ==
- Golf in the United States
- List of Great Britain and Ireland Curtis Cup golfers
- Lists of golfers
