= 2006 Curtis Cup =

Golf competition in Bandon, Oregon

Coordinates: 43.193°N 124.39°W

34th Curtis Cup Match
- Dates: July 29–30, 2006
- Venue: Bandon Dunes Golf Resort; Pacific Dunes Course
- Location: Bandon, Oregon
- Captains: Carol Semple Thompson (USA); Ada O'Sullivan (GB&I)
(United States)	11 1/2	6 1/2	(United Kingdom) (Republic of Ireland)
- United States wins the Curtis Cup

Location in the United States
Location in Oregon

The 34th Curtis Cup Match was played on July 29 and 30, 2006, at Bandon Dunes Golf Resort near Bandon, Oregon. The United States won 11 1/2 to 6 1/2 on the Pacific Dunes course. This was the last two-day Curtis Cup, which expanded to three days in 2008.

== Format ==
The contest was a two-day competition, with three foursomes and six singles matches on each day, a total of 18 points.

Each of the 18 matches was worth one point in the larger team competition. If a match was all square after the 18th hole extra holes were not played. Rather, each side earned a half point toward their team total. The team that accumulated at least 9 1/2 points won the competition. In the event of a tie, the current holder retained the Cup.

== Teams ==
Eight players for the USA and Great Britain & Ireland participated in the event plus one non-playing captain for each team.

Team USA
Name	Age	Notes
Carol Semple Thompson	57	non-playing captain
Amanda Blumenherst	19
Virginia Grimes	42	played in 1998 and 2000
Jennie Lee	19
Taylor Leon	19
Paige Mackenzie	23
Amanda McCurdy	22
Jane Park	19	played in 2004
Jenny Suh	20

& Great Britain & Ireland
Name	Age	Notes
(Republic of Ireland) Ada O'Sullivan	42	non-playing captain
(Republic of Ireland) Claire Coughlan	26	played in 2004
(Republic of Ireland) Tara Delaney	20
(England) Naomi Edwards	22
(Republic of Ireland) Martina Gillen	24
(Wales) Breanne Loucks	18
(Republic of Ireland) Tricia Mangan	32
(England) Kiran Matharu	17
(England) Melissa Reid	18

== Saturday's matches ==
=== Morning foursomes ===
&	Results
Mangan/Mathuru	(United States) 5 & 4	Mackenzie/Blumenherst
Gillen/Edwards	(United States) 2 up	Grimes/McCurdy
Coughlan/Reid	(United States) 1 up	Park/Leon
0	Session	3
0	Overall	3

=== Afternoon singles ===
&	Results
Kiran Mathuru	(United Kingdom) (Republic of Ireland) 2 & 1	Jenny Suh
Martina Gillen	(United States) 4 & 3	Jennie Lee
Breanne Loucks	(United Kingdom) (Republic of Ireland) 5 & 4	Amanda Blumenherst
Melissa Reid	(United States) 5 & 4	Paige Mackenzie
Tara Delaney	(United States) 3 & 2	Jane Park
Claire Coughlan	(United States) 5 & 4	Taylor Leon
2	Session	4
2	Overall	7

== Sunday's matches ==
=== Morning foursomes ===
&	Results
Mangan/Delaney	halved	Park/Leon
Reid/Loucks	(United Kingdom) (Republic of Ireland) 7 & 5	Lee/Suh
Gillen/Edwards	(United Kingdom) (Republic of Ireland) 1 up	Mackenzie/Blumenherst
2 1/2	Session	1/2
4 1/2	Overall	7 1/2

=== Afternoon singles ===
&	Results
Martina Gillen	(United Kingdom) (Republic of Ireland) 3 & 2	Virginia Grimes
Breanne Loucks	(United Kingdom) (Republic of Ireland) 3 & 2	Amanda McCurdy
Tricia Mangan	(United States) 1 up	Paige Mackenzie
Naomi Edwards	(United States) 5 & 4	Taylor Leon
Melissa Reid	(United States) 3 & 2	Jennie Lee
Tara Delaney	(United States) 3 & 2	Jane Park
2	Session	4
6 1/2	Overall	11 1/2
