= Breanne Loucks =

Welsh professional golfer (born 1987)

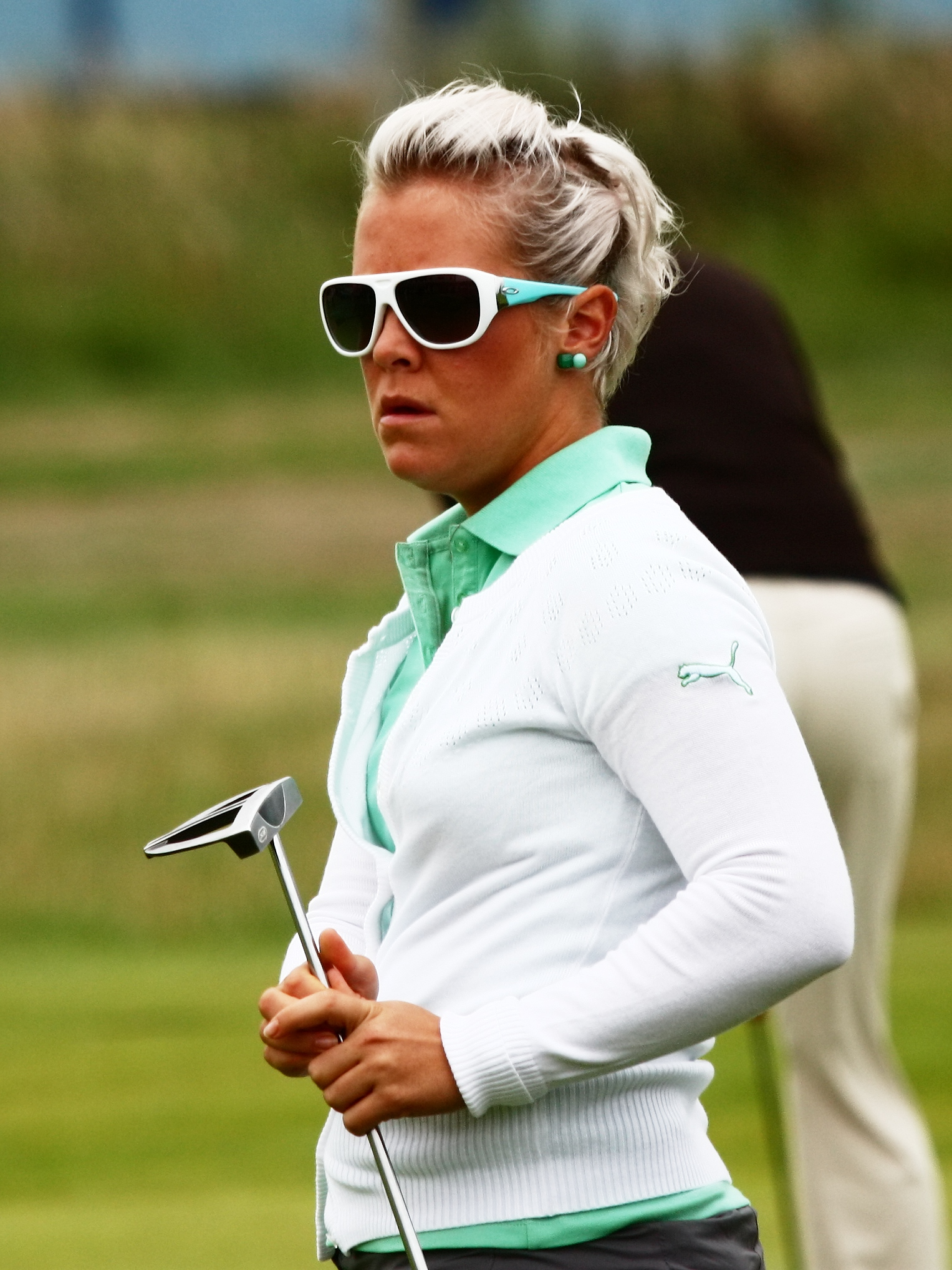
- Loucks practices before final qualifying round before 2010 Ricoh Women's British Open

Personal information
- Full name: Breanne Alicia Loucks
- Nationality: Wales
- Born: 16 October 1987 (age 39) Canada

Career
- Sport: Golf
- Turned professional: 2009
- Former tour: Ladies European Tour

Breanne Alicia Loucks (born 16 October 1987) is a Welsh professional golfer. She had a successful amateur career, playing in two Curtis Cup matches, in 2006 and 2008. She turned professional in early 2009 and played on the Ladies European Tour until 2011 when injury curtailed her career.

== Amateur career ==
In 2007, she won the Welsh Ladies' Amateur Championship, beating Tara Davies in the final. In early 2008, she won both the South African stroke-play and South African match-play championships. In June 2008, she won the Irish Women's Amateur Open Championship.

Loucks first played for Wales in the Girls Home Internationals in 2002, aged 14, and made her debut in the Women's Home Internationals in 2004. She later represented Wales in the Espirito Santo Trophy and the European Ladies' Team Championship. She played in the 2008 Women's Home Internationals at Wrexham, when Wales won for only the second time. She played for Great Britain & Ireland in the Curtis Cup in 2006 and 2008. In 2006 she won all three matches she played in, two singles and a foursomes, while in 2008 she won one of her four matches. In 2007, she was in the winning British team in the Commonwealth Trophy in South Africa, and she also played in the Vagliano Trophy.

== Professional career ==
Loucks turned professional at the start of 2009 and played on the Ladies European Tour. She had a successful first season, including being joint runner-up in the Open de España Femenino behind Becky Brewerton. She had three top-20 finishes in the first half of 2010 but then had an elbow injury. She played in a number of events in 2011 without success and dropped off the tour.

== Team appearances ==
Amateur

- Curtis Cup (representing Great Britain & Ireland): 2006, 2008
- Vagliano Trophy (representing Great Britain & Ireland): 2007
- Commonwealth Trophy (representing Great Britain): 2007 (winners)
- Espirito Santo Trophy (representing Wales): 2006, 2008
- European Ladies' Team Championship (representing Wales): 2005, 2007, 2008
- Women's Home Internationals (representing Wales): 2004, 2005, 2006, 2007, 2008 (winners)
- Girls Home Internationals (representing Wales): 2002, 2003, 2004, 2005
