= 2026 Curtis Cup =

Golf competition in Los Angeles, California

44th Curtis Cup Match
- Dates: June 12–4, 2026
- Venue: Bel-Air Country Club
- Location: Los Angeles, California, U.S.
- Captains: Meghan Stasi (USA); Catriona Matthew (GB&I)
| (United States) | 13 | 7 | (United Kingdom) (Republic of Ireland) |
- United States wins the Curtis Cup

Location map
- Location in the United States Location in California

The 44th Curtis Cup Match was played June 12–14, 2026 at Bel-Air Country Club in Bel-Air, Los Angeles, California, United States.

The United States team won 13–7. American Farah O'Keefe won all five of her matches, the fourth golfer to do so in Curtis Cup history.

== Format ==
The contest was a three-day competition, with three foursomes and three fourball matches on each of the first two days, and eight singles matches on the final day, a total of 20 points.

Each of the 20 matches was worth one point in the larger team competition. If a match ended all square after the 18th hole extra holes were not played. Rather, each side earned 1/2 point toward their team total. The team that accumulated at least 10 1/2 points won the competition. In the event of a tie, the current holder retained the Cup.

== Teams ==
Eight players for Great Britain & Ireland and USA participated in the event plus one non-playing captain for each team.

USA
| Name | Age | Rank | Notes |
| Meghan Stasi | 47 | – | non-playing captain |
| Anna Davis | 20 | 18 | played in 2024 |
| Kary Hollenbaugh | 21 | 23 |
| Jasmine Koo | 20 | 12 | played in 2024 |
| Farah O'Keefe | 20 | 3 |
| Kiara Romero | 20 | 1 | won 2023 U.S. Girls' Junior |
| Asterisk Talley | 17 | 8 | played in 2024 |
| Avery Weed | 20 | 30 |
| Kelly Xu | 22 | 14 |

& Great Britain & Ireland
| Name | Age | Rank | Notes |
| (Scotland) Catriona Matthew | 56 | – | non-playing captain |
| (Northern Ireland) Beth Coulter | 21 | 106 | played in 2024 |
| (England) Sophia Fullbrook | 20 | 38 | won 2022 English Girls' Open Amateur Championship |
| (England) Lily Hirst | 23 | 411 | won 2024 English Women's Open Amateur Stroke Play Championship |
| (England) Isla McDonald-O'Brien | 19 | 97 |
| (England) Charlotte Naughton | 18 | 88 |
| (England) Nellie Ong | 19 | 59 |
| (England) Patience Rhodes | 22 | 20 | played in 2024 |
| (England) Davina Xanh | 22 | 117 |

Note: "Rank" is the World Amateur Golf Ranking as of the start of the Cup.

== Friday's matches ==
=== Morning fourballs ===
| & | Results |
|---|---|---|
| Hirst/Xanh | (United States) 4 & 2 | Romero/Talley |
| Fullbrook/Rhodes | (United Kingdom) (Republic of Ireland) 2 & 1 | Davis/Xu |
| Naughton/Ong | (United States) 2 up | Koo/O'Keefe |
| 1 | Session | 2 |
| 1 | Overall | 2 |

=== Afternoon foursomes ===
| & | Results |
|---|---|---|
| Coulter/McDonald-O'Brien | (United Kingdom) (Republic of Ireland) 3&2 | Romero/Talley |
| Naughton/Ong | (United States) 4 & 3 | Davis/Xu |
| Fullbrook/Rhodes | (United States) 3 & 2 | O'Keefe/Weed |
| 1 | Session | 2 |
| 2 | Overall | 4 |

== Saturday's matches ==
=== Morning fourballs ===
| & | Results |
|---|---|---|
| Coulter/McDonald-O'Bien | (United States) 1 up | Koo/O'Keefe |
| Fullbrook/Rhodes | (United Kingdom) (Republic of Ireland) 3 & 2 | Davis/Weed |
| Hirst/Ong | (United States) 4 & 3 | Romero/Talley |
| 1 | Session | 2 |
| 3 | Overall | 6 |

=== Afternoon foursomes ===
| & | Results |
|---|---|---|
| Naughton/Xanh | (United Kingdom) (Republic of Ireland) 3 & 2 | DAvis/Talley |
| Fullbrook/Rhodes | (United Kingdom) (Republic of Ireland) 2 up | Hollenbaugh/Xu |
| Coulter/McDonald-O'Brien | (United States) 4 & 3 | O'Keefe/Weed |
| 2 | Session | 1 |
| 5 | Overall | 7 |

== Sunday's singles matches ==
| & | Results |
|---|---|---|
| Patience Rhodes | (United Kingdom) (Republic of Ireland) 1 up | Kelly Xu |
| Sophia Fullbrook | (United Kingdom) (Republic of Ireland) 1 up | Avery Weed |
| Nellie Ong | (United States) 1 up | Jasmine Koo |
| Isla McDonald-O'Brien | (United States) 1 up | Kiara Romero |
| Davina Xanh | (United States) 2 & 1 | Asterisk Talley |
| Charlotte Naughton | (United States) 2 & 1 | Farah O'Keefe |
| Lily Hirst | (United States) 1 up | Kary Hollenbaugh |
| Beth Coulter | (United States) 4 & 3 | Anna Davis |
| 2 | Session | 6 |
| 7 | Overall | 13 |
