= Jeanne Bisgood =

English amateur golfer (1923–2024)

Personal information
- Full name: Jeanne Mary Bisgood
- Nationality: England
- Born: 11 August 1923 Surrey, England
- Died: 15 May 2024 (aged 100)

Career
- Sport: Golf
- Status: Amateur

Jeanne Mary Bisgood CBE (11 August 1923 – 15 May 2024) was an English amateur golfer. She won the English Women's Amateur Championship three times, in 1951, 1953 and 1957 and played in the Curtis Cup three times, in 1950, 1952 and 1954.

== Early life ==
Bisgood was born on 11 August 1923, the daughter of the Bert Bisgood and Dorothy Cundall, who were married in 1922.

Bert Bisgood had played cricket for Somerset, becoming the first Somerset cricketer to score a century on debut. He was also a badminton international for Ireland.

Dorothy was also a noted badminton player, winning three doubles titles at the All England Open Badminton Championships. She had previously married, in 1912, Major Douglas Harvey, who was killed in Mesopotamia in 1917, with whom she had a son Ian Harvey who became a Conservative MP.

== Golf career ==
As a 15-year-old, Bisgood played in the 1938 Girls Amateur Championship at Stoke Poges, losing 5&4 to Sheila Stroyan in the second round. In August 1945, she won the Daily Sketch Women's National Tournament, an 18-hole stroke-play event at Royal Mid-Surrey, with a score of 75. In 1948 she reached the quarter-finals of the English Women's Amateur Championship.

In 1949, Bisgood played for England in the Women's Home Internationals for the first time, winning her singles match as England won narrowly 5–4 against Scotland. In the Women's Amateur Championship, she beat the American Grace Lenczyk in the third round but then lost to Clarrie Reddan. Following the championship she was selected for the British team to play Belgium and then France in the Vagliano Trophy.

Bisgood reached the quarter-finals of the 1950 Women's Amateur Championship, losing 3&2 to Jessie Valentine, a performance good enough to see her selected for the 1950 Curtis Cup team at the Country Club of Buffalo in September. She represented England in a match against a team of visiting Australian women, winning her singles match. In the 1950 Curtis Cup, the Americans won 7 matches to 1, with one match halved, Bisgood losing both her matches. The team later played a Canadian team, Bisgood winning both her matches in an 8–2 victory.

In 1951, Bisgood reached the semi-finals of the Women's Amateur Championship at Broadstone Golf Club, losing at the 22nd hole to Kitty MacCann. She had beaten Beverly Hanson in the quarter-finals. The following week she again played for Britain against Belgium and then France, the British team winning both matches. In July she won the Daily Graphic Women's National Tournament at Wentworth, scoring 80 on the west course and then 69 on the east course. In October she won the English Women's Amateur Championship at St Annes Old Links, beating Gabrielle Keiller 2&1 in the 36-hole final.

Bisgood was selected for the 1952 Curtis Cup team at Muirfield. The British team took a 2–1 lead on the first day, Bisgood not being selected for these foursomes match. The singles matches were tied 3–3, to give Britain their first Curtis Cup win. Playing in the fourth singles match, Bisgood beat Mae Murray 6&5. The following week, the pair met again in the quarter-finals of the Women's Amateur Championship, Murray winning this time at the 19th hole. In her defence of the English Women's Amateur Championship she lost to Frances Stephens in the third round.

Bisgood was part of the British team that won the Commonwealth tournament at Formby in early July 1953. The other teams were Canada, New Zealand and a British juniors team. The New Zealanders and Canadians also played matches against England, Bisgood playing both matches. She also competed in the 72-hole Sunday Graphic Women's National Tournament at Sunningdale. She finished third, behind Frances Stephens and Jean Donald. In September at Prince’s she won the English Women's Amateur Championship for the second time, beating Jean McIntyre 6&5 in the final.

In November 1953, Bisgood was one of the first three women selected for the 1954 Curtis Cup team at Merion Golf Club. In late June 1954 she reached the quarter-finals of the Women's Amateur Championship, losing by one hole to Frances Stephens. In the Curtis Cup, the Americans won 6 matches to 3. Bisgood did not play in the foursomes and lost her singles match. The team had earlier won a match against a Canadian team, Bisgood winning both her matches.

Bisgood won a number of one-day events in Britain, including the 18-hole Roehampton Gold Cup, which she won three times in succession from 1951 to 1953, and the 36-hole Astor Salver which she won in the same three years. She also won a number of open championships on the continent. She was the Swedish champion in 1952, the German and Italian champion in 1953, the Portuguese champion in 1954 and the Norwegian champion in 1955. In 1957 she won the English Women's Amateur Championship for the third time, beating Margaret Nichol 10&8 in the final. The event was held at Queens' Park in Bournemouth. At the time she was using a croquet-style putting technique. In early 1958 she was one of 11 players asked whether they would be available for the Curtis Cup match. However she withdrew from consideration. Bisgood represented England eight times in Women's Home Internationals being on the winning team four times, in 1949, 1953, 1954 and 1958.

Bisgood was the non-playing captain of the Curtis Cup team in 1970. She was the first lady president of Parkstone Golf Club and was a member for over 80 years.

== Personal life ==
Bisgood's family moved from London to the Bournemouth area in 1940. She studied history at the University of Oxford in 1941, but left after a year to join the Women's Royal Naval Service. She worked at Stanmore, an outstation of Bletchley Park, which housed over 50 Enigma code-breaking machines. After the war she didn't return to Oxford but trained as a barrister, passing her final examination in 1947. After her mother's death in 1954, she returned to Poole. She joined Poole Council in 1955 and was active in the education area. She was also a magistrate.

Bisgood celebrated her 100th birthday on 11 August 2023. She died on 15 May 2024.

== Honours ==
Bisgood was appointed a Commander of the Order of the British Empire (CBE) in the 1982 Birthday Honours as chairman of the Dorset Education Committee. She was given an honorary Doctor of Education at Bournemouth University in 2018.

== Team appearances ==
- Curtis Cup (representing Great Britain & Ireland): 1950, 1952 (winners), 1954, 1970 (non-playing captain)
- Canada–Great Britain match (representing Great Britain & Ireland): 1950 (winners), 1954 (winners)
- Commonwealth tournament (representing Great Britain & Ireland): 1953 (winners)
- Vagliano Trophy (representing Great Britain & Ireland): 1949 (winners), 1951 (winners)
- Belgium–Great Britain match (representing Great Britain & Ireland): 1949 (winners), 1951 (winners)
- Women's Home Internationals (representing England): 1949 (winners), 1950, 1951, 1952, 1953 (winners), 1954 (winners), 1956, 1958 (winners)
- England–New Zealand match (representing England): 1953 (winners)
- England–Canada match (representing England): 1953 (winners)
