= Elaine Farquharson-Black =

Scottish amateur golfer

Personal information
- Nationality: Scotland
- Born: 21 March 1968 (age 58) Aberdeen, Scotland

Career
- Sport: Golf
- Status: Amateur

Elaine Farquharson-Black (née Farquharson, born 21 March 1968) is a Scottish amateur golfer. She won the Helen Holm Scottish Women's Open Championship in 1987, the Scottish Women's Amateur Championship in 1990 and reached the final of the 1989 Ladies' British Open Amateur Championship. She played in the Curtis Cup in 1990 and 1992 and was the non-playing captain in 2016 and 2018.

== Golf career ==
Farquharson-Black reached the final of the Girls Amateur Championship in 1984 and 1985, but lost both times. In 1984, at Llandudno (Maesdu) she lost by one hole to Carol Swallow while in 1985 at Hesketh she lost 3&1 to Susan Shapcott. Earlier in 1985, she had won the Scottish girls championship beating Elaine Moffat by two holes in the final. In 1984 and 1985, she played in Scottish team in the Girls Home Internationals, Scotland winning the event in 1984.

In 1987, she won the Helen Holm Scottish Women's Open Championship, a stroke ahead of Malin Landehag. In 1989, she reached the final of the Ladies' British Open Amateur Championship at Royal Liverpool, losing 6&5 to Helen Dobson in the 18-hole final. She won the Scottish Women's Amateur Championship in 1990 and was runner-up to Janice Moodie in 1992.

Farquharson-Black was selected for the 1990 Curtis Cup in Bernardsville, New Jersey. The American won by 14 points to 4, with Farquharson-Black losing all four of her matches. She played again in the 1992 match at Royal Liverpool, Great Britain & Ireland winning by 10 points to 8. She was not selected for the foursomes matches but won one of her two singles, beating Robin Weiss but losing to Sarah LeBrun Ingram on the final day. She competed in the Vagliano Trophy in 1989 and 1991 and in the 1991 Commonwealth Trophy. Playing with Helen Dobson for Great Britain & Ireland, she won the 1989 world amateur fourball title in Brazil.

Farquharson-Black turned professional after the 1992 Curtis Cup to play on the Women Professional Golfers' European Tour but had little success. In late 1994, she applied to be reinstated as an amateur and was able to compete again as an amateur in 1997, competing in the Women's Home Internationals that year and in the winning Scottish team in 1998. She was the non-playing captain of the Curtis Cup team in 2016 and 2018.

== Personal life ==
Farquharson-Black was born in Aberdeen in 1968 the daughter of Colin and Ethel Farquharson. She married Jonathan Black in 1993 and adopted the name Elaine Farquharson-Black.

== Team appearances ==
- Girls Home Internationals (representing Scotland): 1984 (winners), 1985
- European Lady Junior's Team Championship (representing Scotland): 1986, 1988
- Women's Home Internationals (representing Scotland): 1987, 1988 (winners), 1989, 1990 (winners), 1991 (winners), 1997, 1998 (winners)
- Curtis Cup (representing Great Britain & Ireland): 1990, 1992 (winners), 2016 (non-playing captain, winners), 2018 (non-playing captain)
- Vagliano Trophy (representing Great Britain & Ireland): 1989 (winners), 1991 (winners)
- Commonwealth Trophy (representing Great Britain): 1991 (winners)
- European Ladies' Team Championship (representing Scotland): 1989, 1991
