= Megan Schofill =

American professional golfer (born 2001)

Personal information
- Full name: Megan Elizabeth Schofill
- Nationality: United States
- Born: December 14, 2001 (age 24)

Career
- Sport: Golf
- College: Auburn University
- Turned professional: 2024
- Professional wins: 1

Number of wins by tour
- Epson Tour: 1

Best results in LPGA major championships
- Chevron Championship: CUT: 2024
- Women's PGA C'ship: DNP
- U.S. Women's Open: T44: 2024
- Women's British Open: DNP
- Evian Championship: CUT: 2024

Megan Elizabeth Schofill (born December 14, 2001) is an American professional golfer and winner of the 2023 U.S. Women's Amateur.

== Early life and education ==
Schofill grew up in Monticello, Florida and began playing golf at an early age. She initially committed to the University of Kentucky to play golf, but later de-committed to attend Auburn University.

== Amateur career ==
Schofill was the winner of the 2020 Florida Women's Amateur and also won the 2023 U.S. Women's Amateur played at Bel-Air Country Club in California.

== Professional career ==
Schofill turned professional in late 2024. She finished second at the 2025 IOA Championship on the Epson Tour.

Schofill won her first Epson Tour event at the 2026 Carlisle Arizona Women's Golf Classic.

== Amateur wins ==
- 2017 E-Z-GO Vaughn Taylor Championship
- 2018 Rome Junior Classic, E-Z-GO Vaughn Taylor Championship
- 2019 Rome Junior Classic, Georgia Women's Match Play Championship
- 2020 Lake Oconee Invitational, Florida Women's Amateur, Liz Murphey Fall Collegiate
- 2022 Mason Rudolph Championship
- 2023 U.S. Women's Amateur

== Professional wins (1) ==
=== Epson Tour wins (1) ===
- 2026 Carlisle Arizona Women's Golf Classic

== Results in LPGA majors ==
Tournament	2024
ANA Inspiration	CUT
U.S. Women's Open	T44
Women's PGA Championship	
The Evian Championship	CUT
Women's British Open	

Did not play

CUT = missed the half-way cut
T = tied

== U.S. national team appearances ==
- Arnold Palmer Cup: 2020, 2023 (winners)
- Espirito Santo Trophy: 2023
- Curtis Cup: 2024
