= Danielle Masters =

English golfer

Personal information
- Full name: Danielle Louise Masters
- Nationality: England
- Born: 2 March 1983 (age 43) Pembury, Kent, England

Career
- Sport: Golf
- Turned professional: 2004
- Former tour: Ladies European Tour

Danielle Louise Masters (born 2 March 1983) is an English professional golfer on the Ladies European Tour. She turned pro 1 June 2004.

Masters is from Bearsted in Kent, England.

Masters has been playing on the European tour since 2004 and enjoyed two full successful seasons playing across the world, mainly in Europe. On her third year after earning well in year 1 and an increased amount in year 2, in mid-2008 at BMW Ladies Italian Open in Argentario Golf Resort & Spa she had to pull out of the event due to a back injury. Due to the severity of the injury she was unable to play again that season.

In an attempt to get back playing as soon as possible, Masters saw a number of experts, ranging from sports science injury specialists to chiropractic physicians, none of whom could offer much help. After a number of scans it was clear she had suffered a subluxated disc, which was caused by an underestimated ankle problem. Due to the nature of the injury, time was given as the prognosis.

A few months into the recovery process Masters, due to a number of factors (unhappy with recovery and felt no improvements were being made), had an appointment with a physiotherapist she had been recommended. After just a few treatments with the new physio she was able to set a target to return at the esteemed Dubai Ladies Classic (Emirates Golf Club) in mid December. The goal proved a little too much and she had to pull out after only one round completed. The injury had kept her out of over half the events for that calendar year and she was not able to earn enough to retain her playing rights. The rule which prohibited Masters from playing the following year was removed within a year of it being introduced. Despite a very detailed and compelling dossier submitted for a medical exemption, the case wasn't even considered due to the ephemeral 10 Events Ruling.

In 2009 Masters played in 1 LET Event at the Tenerife Ladies Open, Golf Costa Adeje, in which Felicity Johnson was the winner. In March of that year she got married in her home town.

At the end of 2009 Masters returned to Tour School in an attempt to regain her card. The event was held at La Manga Golf Resort and after 7 competitive rounds of golf and from a field of over 220 players across the week she made it into the top 50. In turn she earned playing rights for 2010.

== Team appearances ==
Amateur

- European Ladies' Team Championship (representing England): 2003
- Vagliano Trophy (representing Great Britain & Ireland): 2003 (winners)
- Curtis Cup (representing Great Britain & Ireland): 2004

Professional

- World Cup (representing England): 2008
