= Farah O'Keefe =

American amateur golfer (born 2005)

Personal information
- Nationality: United States
- Born: June 6, 2005 (age 21) Austin, Texas, U.S.

Career
- Sport: Golf
- College: University of Texas at Austin
- Status: Amateur

Best results in LPGA major championships
- Chevron Championship: T38: 2026
- Women's PGA C'ship: DNP
- U.S. Women's Open: T36: 2025
- Women's British Open: DNP
- Evian Championship: T35: 2026

Achievements and awards
- Big 12 Freshman of the Year: 2023
- Big 12 Player of the Year: 2023
- SEC Player of the Year: 2026
- WGCA Player of the Year: 2026
- ANNIKA Award: 2026
- Honda Sports Award: 2026

Farah O'Keefe (born June 6, 2005) is an American amateur golfer from Texas. She won the 2025 Espirito Santo Trophy and the 2026 NCAA Championship. She became the world number 1 golfer in September 2026.

== Amateur career ==
O'Keefe was born in Austin, Texas. She made her LPGA Tour debut at the 2021 Volunteers of America Classic, where she made the cut.

In 2023, O'Keefe graduated from Anderson High School as the number one player from Texas on Junior Golf Scoreboard, and qualified for the 2023 U.S. Women's Open at Pebble Beach Golf Links.

O'Keefe enrolled at the University of Texas at Austin in 2023. Playing with the Texas Longhorns women's golf team, she was Big 12 Player of the Year and Freshman of the Year. As a junior, she won the NCAA Championship, was WGCA Player of the Year, and won the Honda Sports Award.

O'Keefe won the 2024 Women's Western Amateur and in 2025, she was top-10 at the Augusta National Women's Amateur and runner-up at The Women's Amateur Championship.

Playing for the U.S. National Team, O'Keefe won the 2024 Arnold Palmer Cup, 2025 Espirito Santo Trophy in Singapore, and the 2026 Curtis Cup after going 5–0–0 at Bel-Air Country Club.

== Amateur wins ==
- 2022 LJT Texas Girls' Invitational
- 2024 Darius Rucker Intercollegiate, Women's Western Amateur
- 2026 Therese Hession Regional Challenge, Darius Rucker Intercollegiate, Betsy Rawls Invitational, NCAA Championship, Jackson T. Stephens Cup

== Results in LPGA majors ==
Tournament	2023	2024	2025	2026
Chevron Championship				T38
U.S. Women's Open	CUT		T36	T38
Women's PGA Championship				
The Evian Championship				T35LA
Women's British Open				

Did not play

LA = low amateur
CUT = missed the half-way cut
"T" = tied

== U.S. national team appearances ==
Amateur

- Arnold Palmer Cup: 2024 (winners), 2025, 2026
- Espirito Santo Trophy: 2025 (winners)
- Curtis Cup: 2026 (winners)
