= Pat Lesser Harbottle =

American amateur golfer (1933–2025)

Patricia Ann Lesser Harbottle (August 13, 1933 – July 30, 2025) was an American amateur golfer. As Pat Lesser, her wins include the 1953 Women's National Intercollegiate Golf Tournament and 1955 Women's Western Amateur. At major championships held by the LPGA, she had top four finishes at the 1951 U.S. Women's Open and 1953 Women's Western Open. Lesser was also tied for seventh at the 1955 Titleholders Championship. In United States Golf Association events, she was the winner of the 1950 U.S. Girls' Junior and 1955 U.S. Women's Amateur. Her team won the 1954 Curtis Cup and lost the 1956 Curtis Cup.

Following her marriage, Lesser Harbottle won her third Pacific Northwest Golf Association Women's Amateur in 1965. She was tied for eighth at the 1984 U.S. Senior Women's Amateur. By 2016, she had 23 wins in Tacoma Country and Golf Club events. She joined the PNGA Hall of Fame in 1985 and the Washington Sports Hall of Fame during 1999. The Pat Lesser Harbottle Invitational was created in 2014 by Tacoma Country.

== Early life and education ==
Lesser was born in Fort Totten, New York on August 13, 1933. She lived in New Bedford, Massachusetts, Fort Ethan Allen and Hawaii during the 1930s. Lesser was in Honolulu during the early 1940s when she began playing golf. She experienced the attack on Pearl Harbor with her sibling during 1941. That year, the Lessers left Schofield Barracks. She began her golf career in Seattle during the mid-1940s.

Lesser was on the men's golf team while attending Seattle University during 1952. She remained with them until 1955. During this time period, Lesser won the 1953 Women's National Intercollegiate Golf Tournament. She was second at that event the following year. In 1956, she ended her post-secondary education.

== Career ==
=== 1950–1956 ===
During 1952, Lesser won the Washington State Women's Golf Association Championship and Oregon Amateur Championship. With the Pacific Northwest Golf Association, she was the Women's Amateur winner during 1952 and 1953. At Western Golf Association events, Lesser won the 1950 Women's Western Junior. She was first at the 1955 Women's Western Amateur and second the following year. At the North and South Women's Amateur Golf Championship, Lesser was second during the 1955 event. She reached the quarterfinals at the British Ladies Amateur in 1956 and championship game at that year's Canadian Women's Amateur.

During the 1950s, the Women's Western Open, Titleholders Championship and U.S. Women's Open were played as majors on the LPGA. Lesser tied for fourth place during the 1951 U.S. Women's Open. Following a top four finish at the 1953 Women's Western Open, she was tied for seventh at the 1955 Titleholders Championship. At United States Golf Association events, Lesser won the 1950 U.S. Girls' Junior and the 1955 U.S. Women's Amateur. She won the 1954 Curtis Cup with the United States. They also lost the 1956 Curtis Cup. Lesser reached the final of the Canadian Women's Amateur in 1956.

=== 1957–2025 ===
Lesser continued her golf career in 1957 as a United Airlines employee. As Pat Harbottle, she stopped playing golf that year. Due to pregnancy, she did not enter the 1958 Curtis Cup. Lesser Harbottle returned to golf the following year.

Lesser Harbottle won the 1965 Pacific Northwest Golf Association Women's Amateur. She was also first at the 1974 WSWGA Championship. At the U.S. Senior Women's Amateur, she was tied for eighth place during 1984. With the Tacoma Country and Golf Club, she was a member from 1960 to the mid-2020s. She accumulated 23 wins there by 2016.

== Honors, personal life and death ==
The Pat Lesser Harbottle Invitational was created in 2014 by Tacoma Country and Golf Club. Lesser Harbottle joined the PNGA Hall of Fame in 1985 and the Washington Sports Hall of Fame in 1999. She was also a member of the Seattle University Athletics Hall of Fame. Lesser Harbottle had five children during her marriage.

Lesser Harbottle died on July 30, 2025, at the age of 91.
