= 2006 Espirito Santo Trophy =

Tournament information
- Dates: 18–21 October
- Location: Stellenbosch, South Africa; 33°56′12″S 18°51′41″E
- Courses: De Zalze Golf Club and Stellenbosch Golf Club
- Organized by: International Golf Federation
- Format: 72 holes stroke play

Statistics
- Par: De Zalze: 72; Stellenbosch: 72
- Length: De Zalze: 6,080 yards (5,560 m); Stellenbosch: 6,137 yards (5,612 m)
- Field: 42 teams 125 players

Champion
- South Africa; Stacy Bregman, Kelli Shean, Ashleigh Simon
- 566 (−10)
- Location in Africa Location in South Africa Location in Western Cape

The 2006 Espirito Santo Trophy took place 18–21 October at De Zalze Golf Club and Stellenbosch Golf Club in Stellenbosch in the Western Cape province of South Africa.

It was the 22nd women's golf World Amateur Team Championship for the Espirito Santo Trophy.

The tournament was a 72-hole stroke play team event. There were 42 team entries, each with two or three players.

For the first time since the inaugural edition, there were team entries representing each of the countries England, Scotland and Wales and a combined team representing the Republic of Ireland and Northern Ireland. In former championships, a combined team have represented Great Britain and Ireland.

Each team played two rounds at De Zalze Golf Club and two rounds at Stellenbosch Golf Club in different orders, but all the leading teams played the fourth round at De Zalze. The best two scores for each round counted towards the team total.

The team of the hosting nation South Africa won the Trophy for their first title. Silver medalist and defending champions, team Sweden, had the same total score, but South Africa was declared the winner. The initial tiebreaker, the final round non-counting score of the respective teams, was equal, but the second criteria, the third round non-counting score, was in the favor of South Africa. Team Colombia took the bronze on third place one stroke back.

The individual title went to Caroline Westrup, Sweden, whose score of 8-under-par, 280, was two strokes ahead of Rikako Morita, Japan.

== Teams ==
42 teams entered the event and completed the competition. Each team had three players, except the team representing Croatia, which had only two players.

Country	Players
Argentina	Martina Gavier, Maria Olivero, Manuela Tarazona
Australia	Emma Bennett, Frances Bondad, Kate Combes
Austria	Stefanie Endstrasser, Martina Hochwimmer, Sabrina Poelderl
Belgium	Tamara Luccioli, Benedicte Toumpsin, Lien Willems
Bermuda	Ebonie Burgess, Katyna Rabain, Laura Robinson
Brazil	Mariana De Biase, Cristina Baldi, Patricia Carvalho
Canada	Mary Ann Lapointe, Laura Matthews, Kira Meixner
Chile	Paz Echeverría, Mariá José Hurtado, Alejandra Shaw
Chinese Taipei	Kwan-chih Lu, Yani Tseng, Pei-lin Yu
Colombia	Carolina Llano, Mariajo Uribe, Eileen Vargas
Croatia	Snjezana Crnoglava, Sanja Serfezi Lovric
Czech Republic	Jessica Korda, Zuzana Mašínová, Katerina Ruzickova
Egypt	Naela El Attar, Sophie Sallab, Donia Scarello
England	Melissa Reid, Kerry Smith, Sophie Walker
Finland	Sohvi Härkönen, Kaisa Ruuttila, Hanna-Leena Salonen
France	Isabelle Boineau, Mélodie Bourdy, Anne-Lise Caudal
Gabon	Dominique Offredi, Marie-Cecile Poncet, Zella Vovan
Germany	Sandra Gal, Caroline Masson, Katharina Schallenberg
Guatemala	Maria Cristina Arenas, Maria Alejandra Camey, Beatriz de Arenas
Iceland	Nina Björk Geirsdottir, Anna Lisa Johannsdottir, Tinna Johannsdottir
Ireland	Claire Coughlan, Martina Gillen, Tricia Margan
Italy	Marianna Causin, Claire Grignolo, Anna Rossi
Japan	Erina Hara, Mika Miyazato, Rikako Morita
Mexico	Lili Alvarez, Tanya Dergal, Violeta Retamoza
Netherlands	Christel Boeljon, Marjet van der Graaff, Dewi Claire Schreefel
New Zealand	Sharon Ahn, Natasha Krishna, Sarah Nicholson
Norway	Lene Krog, Ann Kristin Solvang, Amalie Valle
Philippines	Dottie Ardina, Deborah Marie de Villa, Cyna Marie Rodriguez
Puerto Rico	Laura Diaz, Patricia Garcia, Kyle Roig
Russia	Anastasia Kostina, Galina Rotmistrova, Maria Verchenova
Scotland	Krystle Caithness, Heather MacRae, Jenna Wilson
Slovakia	Lujza Bubanová, Veronika Falathová, Renata Petrasová
South Africa	Stacy Bregman, Kelli Shean, Ashleigh Simon
South Korea	Choi He-yong, Chung Jae-eun, Ryu So-yeon
Spain	Carlota Ciganda, Belén Mozo, Azahara Muñoz
Sweden	Sofie Andersson, Anna Nordqvist, Caroline Westrup
Switzerland	Sheila Gut-Lee, Fabienne In-Albon, Caroline Rominger
Trinidad and Tobago	Martine de Gannes, Kelsey Lou-Hing, Monifa Sealy
United States	Amanda Blumenherst, Kimberly Kim, Jennie Lee
Venezuela	Verónica Felibert, Stephanie Gelleni, Yolecci Jiménez
Wales	Tara Davies, Sahra Hassan, Breanne Loucks
Zambia	Tara Allin, Hilda Edwards, Melissa Nawa

== Results ==
Place	Country	Score	To par
1st place, gold medalist(s)	South Africa *	139-138-141-148=566	−10
2nd place, silver medalist(s)	Sweden	139-145-138-144=566	−10
3rd place, bronze medalist(s)	Colombia	147-141-143-136=567	−9
4	France	146-136-142-144=568	−8
T5	Germany	141-139-143-146=569	−7
T5	Japan	137-144-145-143=569	−7
7	New Zealand	146-144-139-141=570	−6
8	Spain	145-146-138-143=572	−4
9	United States	144-146-138-146=574	−2
10	Chinese Taipei	139-147-143-147=576	E
T11	England	145-139-145-149=578	+2
T11	Netherlands	149-140-142-147=578	+2
T11	South Korea	145-141-149-143=578	+2
14	Australia	143-143-150-145=581	+5
15	Canada	142-148-151-142=583	+7
16	Italy	148-144-142-150=584	+8
17	Russia	150-144-147-144=585	+9
18	Mexico	151-148-146-145=590	+14
19	Scotland	153-141-150-147=591	+15
T20	Belgium	151-151-146-145=593	+17
T20	Czech Republic	149-150-145-149=593	+17
T20	Wales	150-148-153-142=593	+17
T23	Austria	151-142-142-159=594	+18
T23	Ireland	152-149-146-147=594	+18
25	Chile	150-151-144-152=597	+21
26	Brazil	154-150-148-150=602	+26
27	Finland	149-154-147-153=603	+27
28	Argentina	153-149-154-149=605	+29
29	Norway	155-150-155-148=608	+32
T30	Philippines	155-148-152-155=610	+34
T30	Venezuela	150-147-155-158=610	+34
32	Bermuda	160-150-148-165=623	+47
33	Iceland	154-154-155-161=624	+48
34	Switzerland	163-157-152-153=625	+49
35	Puerto Rico	157-163-158-158=636	+60
36	Guatemala	162-158-156-162=638	+62
37	Egypt	164-155-166-158=643	+67
38	Trinidad and Tobago	164-164-158-161=657	+81
39	Slovakia	168-163-165-174=670	+94
40	Zambia	176-167-175-176=694	+118
41	Croatia	175-174-178-178=705	+129
42	Gabon	191-187-198-184=760	+184

* South Africa was awarded the tiebreak, since their third player, Ashleigh Simon, had a lower score than Sweden's third player, Sofie Andersson, in the third round, 73 against 77. The initial tiebreaker, the final round non-counting score of the respective teams, was equal.

== Individual leaders ==
There was no official recognition for the lowest individual scores.

Place	Player	Country	Score	To par
1	Caroline Westrup	Sweden	72-73-66-69=280	−8
2	Rikako Morita	Japan	65-72-70-75=282	−6
T3	Azahara Muñoz	Spain	74-72-68-69=283	−5
T3	Pei-lin Yu	Chinese Taipei	66-73-71-73=283	−5
T5	Carolina Llano	Colombia	75-72-71-66=284	−4
T5	Sarah Nicholson	New Zealand	76-73-67-68=284	−4
T7	Mélodie Bourdy	France	74-68-69-74=285	−3
T7	Kelli Shean	South Africa	70-69-72-74=285	−3
T7	Ashleigh Simon	South Africa	69-69-73-74=285	−3
T7	Ryu So-yeon	South Korea	72-70-74-69=285	−3
T7	Eileen Vargas	Colombia	74-69-72-70=285	−3
