= Lisa Maguire =

Irish professional golfer

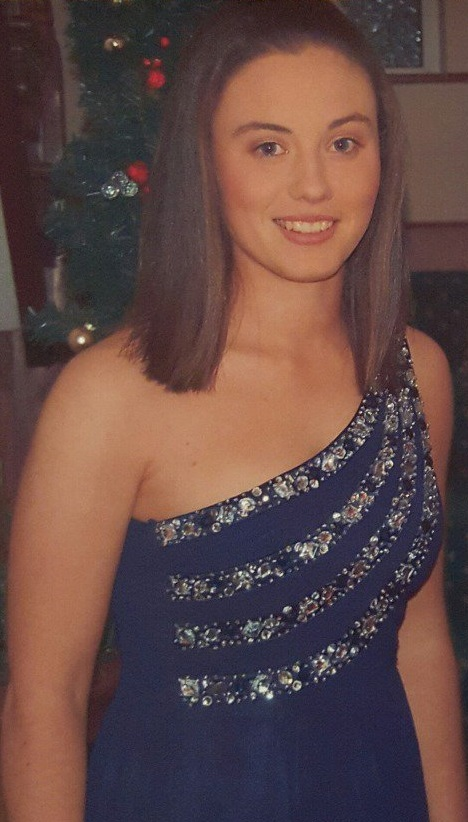
- Maguire in November 2015

Personal information
- Nationality: Ireland
- Born: 30 November 1994 (age 31) Ireland

Career
- Sport: Golf
- College: Duke University
- Turned professional: 2018
- Current tour: LET Access Series

Lisa Maguire (born 30 November 1994) is a former Irish professional golfer. In 2011, she was ranked as high as 10th in the world on the World Amateur Golf Ranking. She retired in 2019.

== Life ==
A native of County Cavan, her parents are schoolteachers Declan and Breda Maguire. At the age of 9 she gave up a swimming career to concentrate on golf, after breaking her arm in a playground accident. She is 15 minutes older than her twin sister Leona who is also a professional golfer.

== Amateur career ==
=== 2005 ===
Maguire began her amateur golf career on 17 March 2005 in a competition at Castle Hume golf course in Enniskillen, County Fermanagh, playing off a handicap of 36. She was the leading golfer in the Lady Captain's prize at Castle Hume but winners had to aged 18+ whereas she was only 10 years old so she was ineligible for the prize. She later achieved her first hole-in-one at Dunmurry's 163-yard 16th hole in the Peggy Nelson Trophy finals. On 13 November she won the Young Masters Golf Junior Series at La Manga in Spain.

=== 2006 ===
In August, at the age of 11, Maguire beat more than 800 competitors from 30 countries to become the winner of the under-12 World Golf Championship at Pinehurst in North Carolina. Her twin sister Leona Maguire came third. In September, the twins were chosen to bring the Ryder Cup trophy to the stage during the presentation ceremony after Europe's win at the K Club against the USA.

=== 2007 ===
Maguire won the Midland Girls Championship; Ulster Girls Championship; Leinster Girls Championship; Ulster U-19 Schools Championship; Girls Interprovincial Championship; Ulster Girls Order of Merit title; Irish Girls Order of Merit title; Runner-up in Connacht Girls Championship; Semi-finalist in the Irish Ladies Close and Semi-finalist British Girls Championship.

=== 2008 ===
On 21 May, Maguire was runner-up to her twin sister Leona in the Lancome Irish Ladies Close Championship at Westport, County Mayo. On 19 July, the positions were reversed when Lisa triumphed over her sister 4 and 3 in the final of the Lancome Irish Girls Close Championship at Mullingar Golf Club. It was the first time in the history of Irish Golf that the Irish Champions of both the Women's and Girls events come from the same family let alone twin sisters. On 26 July, she beat her sister Leona by four shots in the European Young Masters final at Chantilly, France. As a result, both twins were picked for the European Junior Ryder Cup Team which later lost to the US at Olde Stone, Bowling Green, Kentucky on 17 September. In December, she and her sister Leona were named jointly as the Women's Amateur of the Year at the AIB Irish Golf Writers' awards for 2008.

=== 2009 ===
On 26 April, at the age of 14, Maguire came third in the Helen Holm Scottish Women's Open Amateur Strokeplay Golf Championship played at Troon Portland and Troon Old Course. Her sister Leona won the event after a final round score of 73 for a 54-hole aggregate score of −6, 219. On 20 May, she defeated Mary Dowling of New Ross Golf Club by a 5&4 margin in the final of the Lancôme Irish Women's Close in Fota Island. On 21 June, she did the Irish double by winning the Irish Women's Open Stroke Play Championship following a play-off with Hannah Burke after both finished 5-under-par for 54 holes at Douglas Golf Club. On 11 July, the twins were part of the four girl Ireland team which defeated Sweden 4–1 in the final of the European Girls' Team Championship at Kokkola, Finland to become European Champions for the first time in Irish golfing history. She played for Great Britain and Ireland in the Vagliano Trophy in July, becoming the second youngest player at the age of 14 ever to represent the side, along with her twin sister Leona who was the youngest player by 15 minutes. The twins were the joint top highest scorers for the GB & I side which lost to Europe 13–11. Both twins were selected for the 2009 Junior Solheim Cup Team at the Aurora Country Club, Illinois, USA in August. In December, she was named as the Women's Amateur of the Year at the AIB Irish Golf Writers' awards for 2009.

=== 2010 ===
Maguire played for Great Britain and Ireland in the Curtis Cup in 2010, becoming the second youngest player at the age of 15 ever to represent the side, along with her twin sister Leona who was the youngest by 15 minutes.

=== 2011 ===
In March, Maguire won the Spanish International Ladies Amateur Championship in Cádiz and in July she won the European Ladies Amateur Championship at the Noordwijk Golfclub in the Netherlands, becoming the first ever Irish winner. She was chosen along with her sister Leona in the European side which earned a 12–12 draw against the US in the PING Junior Solheim Cup at Knightsbrook in Meath on 21 September. In December, her sister, Leona and she were named jointly as the Women's Amateur of the Year at the AIB Irish Golf Writers' awards, her third time to win the award.

=== 2014 ===
Maguire left secondary school at Loreto College Cavan in Ireland with top scholastic honours and joined Duke University in Durham, North Carolina, U.S.

=== 2015 ===
On 6 July, Maguire was named on the Women's Golf Coaches Association 2015 All-American Scholar Team.

=== 2016 ===
On 24 May Maguire won the Ulster Women's Open Championship at the Royal Belfast Golf Club in Northern Ireland. She registered four match play wins after finishing second in stroke play qualifying with rounds of 76 and 77. On 7 July 2016 she was part of the Ulster team which won the 2016 Ladies Inter-provincial Championship for the second straight year at the Slieve Russell Golf Club in Ballyconnell, County Cavan. On 2 November she helped Duke win the East Lake Cup held at East Lake Golf Club in Atlanta, Georgia, USA, beating Washington State in the final.

=== 2017 ===
At the LSU Tiger Golf Classic held at University Club in Baton Rouge, Louisiana, USA on 26 March, Maguire hit the first eagle of her college career. On 5 July Maguire was selected for the Women's Golf Coaches Association All-American Scholars Team for the second time in her career.

=== 2018 ===
On 18 May, Maguire was honoured as one of only two Duke athletes chosen by the National Strength and Conditioning Association (NSCA) for the All-American Athletes of the Year for the 2017–18 school year.

== Professional career ==
2018

On 5 June 2018, Maguire turned professional. Both herself and her twin sister Leona Maguire signed to singer Niall Horan's golf management company Modest! Golf and also signed sponsorship deals with Puma, Ping, Allianz and KPMG. She will be based in Scottsdale, Arizona. Maguire made her professional debut on 8 June in the ShopRite LPGA Classic at Galloway, New Jersey, US where she made the first eagle of her professional career. On 15 June, Maguire made her debut on the Symetra Tour at the Decatur-Forsyth Classic in Decatur, Illinois, US.

2019

On 5 April, Maguire made her debut on the LET Access Series at the Terre Blanche Ladies Open at Golf de Terre Blanche in Tourrettes, France where she made the cut and finished in 41st place. On 17 May, Maguire achieved her highest placing as a professional with 6th place in the LET Access Series Neuchatel Ladies Championship held at Saint Blaise, Switzerland, with a final total of 224. On 7 November 2019, Maguire retired from professional golf due to a failure to develop a new swing which would allow her to compete at professional levels. Her average drive was 220 yards which left her 40 yards or more behind the professional average. She intends to move into golf management with Modest! Golf.

== Team appearances ==
Amateur

- European Girls' Team Championship (representing Ireland): 2008, 2009 (winners), 2010, 2012
- Junior Ryder Cup (representing Europe): 2008
- Junior Solheim Cup (representing Europe): 2009, 2011
- Vagliano Trophy (representing Great Britain & Ireland): 2009
- Curtis Cup (representing Great Britain & Ireland): 2010
- Espirito Santo Trophy (representing Ireland): 2010
- European Ladies' Team Championship (representing Ireland ): 2011, 2013
