= 1941 Titleholders Championship =

Golf tournament in Augusta, Georgia, US

The 1941 Titleholders Championship, the 5th edition of the Titleholders Championship, was contested from April 7–9 at Augusta Country Club.

This event was won by Dorothy Kirby, with rounds of 80-72-72.

== Final leaderboard ==
Place	Player	Score	To par
1	(United States) Dorothy Kirby	224	−1
2	(United States) Helen Sigel	240	+15
T3	(United States) Gracy Amory	244	+19
T3	(United States) Marion Miley	244	+19
T3	(United States) Georgia Tainter	244	+19
