= 1966 Curtis Cup =

Golf competition in Hot Springs, Virginia

Coordinates: 37.956°N 79.868°W

14th Curtis Cup Match
- Dates: July 29–30, 1966
- Venue: The Homestead
- Location: Hot Springs, Virginia
- Captains: Dorothy Germain Porter (USA); Zara Bolton (British Isles)
(United States)	13	5	(United Kingdom) (Republic of Ireland)
- United States wins the Curtis Cup

The 14th Curtis Cup Match was played on July 29 and 30, 1966 on the Cascades course at The Homestead in Hot Springs, Virginia. The United States won by 13 matches to 5, to retain the trophy.

The United States took a 7–2 lead after the opening day and won two of the foursomes and three of the singles matches on the final day to win the contest.

== Format ==
The contest was a two-day competition, with three foursomes and six singles matches on each day, a total of 18 points.

Each of the 18 matches was worth one point in the larger team competition. If a match was all square after the 18th hole extra holes were not played. Rather, each side earned 1/2 a point toward their team total. The team that accumulated at least 9 1/2 points won the competition. In the event of a tie, the current holder retained the Cup.

== Teams ==
United States
Name	Notes
Dorothy Germain Porter	non-playing captain, played in 1950
Jean Ashley	played in 1962
Barbara Fay Boddie	played in 1964
Carol Flenniken	played in 1964
Barbara McIntire	played in 1958, 1960, 1962 and 1964
Phyllis Preuss	played in 1962 and 1964
Nancy Syms	played in 1964
Anne Welts	played in 1958, 1960 and 1962
Helen Wilson	played in 1950

& British Isles
Name	Notes
(Northern Ireland) Zara Bolton	playing captain, played in 1948
(England) Susan Armitage	played in 1964
(England) Angela Bonallack	played in 1956, 1958, 1960, 1962 and 1964
(Republic of Ireland) Ita Burke
(England) Liz Chadwick
(Scotland) Marjory Fowler
(Scotland) Joan Hastings
(Scotland) Belle Robertson	played in 1960
(England) Pam Tredinnick

Chadwick was not in the original team, being selected as first reserve, but was added when Julia Greenhalgh later withdrew with an injured hand.

== Friday's matches ==
=== Morning foursomes ===
&	Results
Bonallack/Armitage	(United States) 1 up	Ashley/Preuss
Robertson/Hastings	halved	Welts/McIntire
Chadwick/Tredinnick	(United States) 1 up	Boddie/Flenniken
1/2	Session	2 1/2
1/2	Overall	2 1/2

=== Afternoon singles ===
&	Results
Belle Robertson	(United States) 1 up	Jean Ashley
Susan Armitage	halved	Anne Welts
Angela Bonallack	(United States) 3 & 2	Barbara Fay Boddie
Liz Chadwick	(United States) 2 up	Nancy Syms
Ita Burke	(United Kingdom) (Republic of Ireland) 3 & 1	Helen Wilson
Marjory Fowler	(United States) 3 & 1	Carol Flenniken
1 1/2	Session	4 1/2
2	Overall	7

== Saturday's matches ==
=== Morning foursomes ===
&	Results
Bonallack/Armitage	(United States) 3 & 1	Ashley/Preuss
Chadwick/Burke	(United Kingdom) (Republic of Ireland) 1 up	McIntire/Welts
Robertson/Hastings	(United States) 2 & 1	Boddie/Flenniken
1	Session	2
3	Overall	9

=== Afternoon singles ===
&	Results
Angela Bonallack	(United Kingdom) (Republic of Ireland) 2 & 1	Jean Ashley
Belle Robertson	halved	Anne Welts
Susan Armitage	(United States) 3 & 2	Barbara Fay Boddie
Pamela Tredinnick	halved	Nancy Syms
Liz Chadwick	(United States) 3 & 2	Phyllis Preuss
Ita Burke	(United States) 2 & 1	Carol Flenniken
2	Session	4
5	Overall	13
