= Judy Bell =

American golfer and golf administrator (1936–2025)

Personal information
- Full name: Judith May Bell
- Nationality: United States
- Born: September 23, 1936 Wichita, Kansas, U.S.
- Died: November 3, 2025 (aged 89) Colorado, U.S.

Career
- Sport: Golf
- Status: Amateur

Judith May Bell (September 23, 1936 – November 3, 2025) was an American amateur golfer and golf administrator. She was inducted into the World Golf Hall of Fame in 2001 in the Lifetime Achievement category, which honors people who have made an exceptional contribution to the sport in areas outside of tournament wins.

== Career ==
Bell was born in Wichita, Kansas, on September 23, 1936, and took up golf at the age of seven, winning the girls' division in her first tournament at age ten – in a field of one. In 1952, she lost to Mickey Wright in the semi-finals of the U.S. Girls' Junior, which was to remain her best result in a United States Golf Association (USGA) event. Bell also won the Broadmoor Golf Club Invitational three times in Colorado Springs, Colorado. She played for the United States in the Curtis Cup in 1960 and 1962. In 1967, she shot 67 in the U.S. Women's Open, which remained a record for 14 years.

She became a USGA volunteer in 1961, when she was a member of the Junior Championship Committee. In the 1970s, she became a rules official. She later served on the Women's Committee and in 1987 became the first woman on the executive committee. In 1996, she was elected as the 54th president of the USGA, the first woman to hold the senior office in American golf. During her tenure and subsequently, she played a leading role in programs to take golf to youth, minorities and the disabled.

== Personal life ==
Bell died at her home in Colorado on November 3, 2025, at the age of 89.

== Awards and honors ==
- In 2001, Bell was inducted into the World Golf Hall of Fame in the Lifetime Achievement category.
- In 2015, she received an honorary lifetime membership at the historic Royal and Ancient Golf Club of St Andrews.
- In 2016, Bell received the Bob Jones Award, the USGA's highest honor.

== Amateur wins ==
- Broadmoor Ladies Invitational (three times)

== U.S. national team appearances ==
Amateur

- Curtis Cup: 1960 (winners), 1962 (winners), 1986 (non-playing captain), 1988 (non-playing captain)
