= Grace DeMoss =

American amateur golfer (1927–2024)

Grace DeMoss Zwahlen
Personal information
- National team: U.S. Curtis Cup team (1952, 1954)
- Born: September 29, 1927 Corvallis, Oregon, U.S.
- Died: November 25, 2024 (aged 97) Coto de Caza, California, U.S.
- Education: Oregon State University
- Occupations: Amateur golfer, high school golf coach
- Spouse: Fred C. Zwahlen Jr.

Sport
- Sport: Golf

Achievements and titles
- National finals: 1949 Canadian Women's Amateur

Grace DeMoss Zwahlen (September 29, 1927 – November 25, 2024) was an American amateur golfer from Oregon.

DeMoss was the first Pacific Northwesterner to be named to the United States Curtis Cup team in 1952 and then again in 1954. After retiring from competitive golf, Zwahlen was elected to numerous sports Halls of Fame. From 1986 to 2017 she gave back to the game of golf by serving as a girls' golf coach at high schools in Oregon and Southern California.

== Early life and college career ==
DeMoss was born in Corvallis, Oregon on September 29, 1927, one of five daughters of Ray DeMoss, a Corvallis businessman. She started playing golf as a teenager at the Corvallis Country Club, though she was initially more interested in equestrian sports.

She entered her first tournament, the Portland Open, in 1945 and came in last place. In her next major tournament a year later, the Pacific Northwest Golf Association Amateur, she made the semifinals, and then a year after that, lost in the finals. Her first tournament victory came in the 1947 Portland City Amateur.

DeMoss graduated from Oregon State University in 1952, but did not compete collegiately as Oregon State did not have a women's golf team until the 1970s.

== Golf career ==
After her win in Portland, she entered tournaments across North America, primarily on the west coast. In 1949, she won her first major tournament, the Canadian Women's Amateur. Following that win, she played throughout the winter in California to keep her game sharp. In 1950, she won the Pacific Northwest Amateur Championship played at Capilano Golf and Country Club in West Vancouver, British Columbia. She followed this victory with a semifinalist finish at the U.S. Women's Amateur, and was a finalist at the Canadian Women's Amateur, the Women's Trans-Mississippi, and the Oregon Women's Amateur, and was medalist at the Women's Western Open.

In 1952, she was named to the United States' Curtis Cup team, the first golfer from the Northwest to receive the honor. However, that year, the American team lost the Cup for the first time since its inception. Two years later, in 1954, DeMoss was again named to the team. This time, DeMoss and her team reclaimed the Cup at the matches contested at Merion Golf Club.

Following her early success, she relocated to Florida to play golf year round where she won Florida Women's Amateur championships in 1955, 1957, and 1958. She returned to the Northwest to claim three straight Oregon women's amateur titles from 1956 to 1958.

She continued to play competitively into the 1960s before retiring to start and raise her family. From 1986–2006, she was the girls' golf coach at Crescent Valley High School in her hometown of Corvallis, Oregon and from 2007–2017 she was the girls' freshman/sophomore golf coach at Santa Margarita Catholic High School in Rancho Santa Margarita, California.

== Personal life and death ==
Following her college graduation, DeMoss married Howard K. Smith and golfed as "Mrs. Grace DeMoss Smith" or "Mrs. Howard Smith" for several years. She was later married to Fred C. Zwahlen Jr., who was the founder and chairman of the Department of Journalism at Oregon State, from the late 1950s until his death in 2004.

DeMoss resided in Coto de Caza, California and had two children, daughter Molly Katherine Zwahlen Walsh (husband Mark Walsh) also of Coto de Caza and son Skip DeMoss Zwahlen of Venice, California. She died in Coto de Caza on November 25, 2024, at the age of 97.

== Awards and honors ==
- In 1986, DeMoss earned entry into the Oregon Sports Hall of Fame.
- In 1991, she was inducted into the Oregon State University Sports Hall of Fame.
- In 1993, DeMoss entered the Pacific Northwest Golf Association Hall of Fame.
- In 2016, she was inducted into the Corvallis High School Hall of Fame.

== Tournament wins ==
- 1949 Arizona Women's Amateur, Pebble Beach Women's Golf Championship, Howell Team Trophy, Trans-Mississippi Golf Tournament (with Edean Anderson Ihlanfeldt), Canadian Women's Amateur
- 1950 Pacific Northwest Women's Amateur, Oregon Women's Amateur, Pebble Beach Women's Golf Championship, Monterey 54-hole stroke play
- 1950 Fresno Open
- 1951 Oregon Women's Amateur, Trans-Mississippi, Howell Team Trophy, Trans-Mississippi Golf Tournament (with Edean Ihlanfeldt)
- 1952 Howell Team Trophy, Trans-Mississippi Golf Tournament (with Edean Anderson Ihlanfeldt)
- 1954 Doherty Women's Amateur Championship
- 1955 Florida Women's Amateur
- 1956 Oregon Women's Amateur
- 1957 Oregon Women's Amateur, Florida Women's Amateur
- 1958 Oregon Women's Amateur, Florida Women's Amateur

== Team appearances ==
Amateur

- Curtis Cup (representing the United States): 1952, 1954 (winners)
