= Kimberly Kim =

American professional golfer (born 1991)

Personal information
- Nicknames: Kim Squared, K Squared, Kim Kim
- Nationality: United States
- Born: August 23, 1991 (age 35) Hilo, Hawaii, U.S.
- Height: 5 ft 4 in (1.63 m)

Career
- Sport: Golf
- College: University of Denver
- Turned professional: 2010
- Current tour: LPGA Tour

Best results in LPGA major championships
- Chevron Championship: CUT: 2007, 2010
- Women's PGA C'ship: CUT: 2007
- U.S. Women's Open: T66: 2006
- Women's British Open: DNP

Kimberly Kim (born August 23, 1991) is an American professional golfer who plays on the LPGA Tour.

== Amateur career ==
Kim was born in Hilo, Hawaii. She attended the University of Denver in 2009–10, leading the team with a 73.67 scoring average and winning the 2009-10 SBC Golf Tournament.

At age 14, she became the youngest player to win the U.S. Women's Amateur in 2006. She finished runner-up at the 2006 and 2009 U.S. Women's Amateur Public Links and the 2009 U.S. Girls' Junior.

== Professional career ==
Kim turned professional in July 2010, after finishing tied for 14th at the LPGA Final Qualifying Tournament to earn Priority List Category 11 for the 2011 LPGA season on her first attempt.

== U.S. national team appearances ==
Amateur

- Junior Solheim Cup: 2005 (winners), 2007
- Espirito Santo Trophy: 2006
- Curtis Cup: 2008 (winners), 2010 (winners)
