= 2012 Curtis Cup =

Golf competition in Nairn, Scotland

Coordinates: 57.586°N 3.897°W

37th Curtis Cup Match
- Dates: 8–10 June 2012
- Venue: Nairn Golf Club
- Location: Nairn, Scotland
- Captains: Tegwen Matthews (GB&I); Pat Cornett (USA)
(United Kingdom) (Republic of Ireland)	10 1/2	9 1/2	(United States)
- Great Britain & Ireland wins the Curtis Cup

The 37th Curtis Cup Match was played from 8 to 10 June 2012 at Nairn Golf Club in Nairn, Scotland. Great Britain and Ireland won 10 1/2 to 9 1/2.

== Format ==
The contest was a three-day competition, with three foursomes and three fourball matches on each of the first two days, and eight singles matches on the final day, a total of 20 points.

Each of the 20 matches is worth one point in the larger team competition. If a match is all square after the 18th hole extra holes are not played. Rather, each side earns 1/2 a point toward their team total. The team that accumulates at least 10 1/2 points wins the competition. In the event of a tie, the current holder retains the Cup.

== Teams ==
Eight players for the Great Britain & Ireland and USA participated in the event plus one non-playing captain for each team.

The Great Britain & Ireland team was selected by the Selection Panel of the LGU in March 2012.

& Great Britain & Ireland
Name	Age	Notes
(Wales) Tegwen Matthews	56	non-playing captain
(Wales) Amy Boulden	18
(England) Holly Clyburn	21	played in 2010
(England) Charley Hull	16
(England) Bronte Law	17
(Republic of Ireland) Leona Maguire	17	played in 2010
(Northern Ireland) Stephanie Meadow	20
(Scotland) Pamela Pretswell	22	played in 2010
(England) Kelly Tidy	20

Five of the American team were selected in December 2011 (Anderson, Duncan, Ernst, Lua and Pancake). The remaining three members of the team (McCloskey, Popson and Tubert) were announced in January 2012.

Team USA
Name	Age	Notes
Pat Cornett	56	non-playing captain
Amy Anderson	19
Lindy Duncan	21
Austin Ernst	20
Tiffany Lua	21	played in 2010
Lisa McCloskey	20
Brooke Pancake	22
Erica Popson	21
Emily Tubert	20

== Friday's matches ==
=== Morning foursomes ===
&	Results
Tidy/Boulden	(United States) 1 up	Ernst/Pancake
Clyburn/Law	(United States) 2 & 1	Anderson/Lua
Maguire/Meadow	(United States) 5 & 4	Duncan/McCloskey
0	Session	3
0	Overall	3

=== Afternoon fourballs ===
&	Results
Prestwell/Hull	(United States) 4 & 3	Anderson/Tubert
Tidy/Clyburn	(United Kingdom) (Republic of Ireland) 2 & 1	Pancake/Popson
Law/Boulden	(United Kingdom) (Republic of Ireland) 3 & 2	Duncan/McCloskey
2	Session	1
2	Overall	4

== Saturday's matches ==
=== Morning foursomes ===
&	Results
Pretswell/Hull	(United States) 3 & 2	Anderson/Lua
Clyburn/Boulden	(United States) 2 up	Ernst/Pancake
Meadow/Maguire	(United Kingdom) (Republic of Ireland) 3 & 1	Duncan/McCloskey
1	Session	2
3	Overall	6

=== Afternoon fourballs ===
&	Results
Clyburn/Tidy	(United Kingdom) (Republic of Ireland) 1 up	Anderson/Tubert
Maguire/Law	halved	Pancake/Ernst
Meadow/Pretswell	(United Kingdom) (Republic of Ireland) 2 up	Popson/Lua
2 1/2	Session	1/2
5 1/2	Overall	6 1/2

== Sunday's singles matches ==
&	Results
Kelly Tidy	(United Kingdom) (Republic of Ireland) 2 & 1	Austin Ernst
Amy Boulden	(United Kingdom) (Republic of Ireland) 3 & 1	Emily Tubert
Holly Clyburn	(United Kingdom) (Republic of Ireland) 3 & 2	Erica Popson
Pamela Pretswell	(United States) 4 & 3	Lisa McCloskey
Bronte Law	(United States) 2 up	Tiffany Lua
Charley Hull	(United Kingdom) (Republic of Ireland) 5 & 3	Lindy Duncan
Stephanie Meadow	(United Kingdom) (Republic of Ireland) 4 & 2	Amy Anderson
Leona Maguire	(United States) 6 & 5	Brooke Pancake
5	Session	3
10 1/2	Overall	9 1/2
