= Phyllis Preuss =

American amateur golfer (1939–2024)

Phyllis Ann "Tish" Preuss (February 9, 1939 – July 27, 2024) was an American amateur golfer. She was runner-up to Anne Quast at the 1961 U.S. Women's Amateur and earned a medal for the lowest round at the 1967 Amateur.

Preuss was born in Detroit, Michigan.

In 1964, Preuss won the North and South Women's Amateur at Pinehurst Resort then captured the prestigious event a second time in 1967. She won the 1965 and 1968 Women's Southern Amateur and the 1967 Women's Eastern Amateur. She was the low amateur at the 1968 and 1969 U.S. Women's Open and was a member of the United States team at the Curtis Cup in 1962, 1964, 1966, 1968, and 1970.

In 1991, Preuss won the U.S. Senior Women's Amateur at Pine Needles Lodge & Golf Club in Southern Pines, North Carolina. On the second day of the Championship she fired a 67, the lowest 18-hole score in its history.

== Team appearances ==
- Curtis Cup (representing the United States): 1962 (winners), 1964 (winners), 1966 (winners), 1968 (winners), 1970 (winners), 1985 (non-playing captain, winners)
