= Polly Riley =

American amateur golfer (1926–2002)

Personal information
- Full name: Polly Ann Riley
- Nationality: United States
- Born: August 27, 1926 San Antonio, Texas, U.S.
- Died: March 13, 2002 (aged 75) Fort Worth, Texas, U.S.

Career
- Sport: Golf
- Status: Amateur
- Professional wins: 3

Number of wins by tour
- LPGA Tour: 1

Best results in LPGA major championships
- U.S. Women's Open: T2: 1947

Polly Ann Riley (August 27, 1926 – March 13, 2002) was an American amateur golfer.

== Career ==
Riley won over 100 tournaments in her career. Although she remained an amateur throughout her career, she won the first LPGA Tour event, the 1950 Tampa Open.

Riley was runner-up in the 1953 U.S. Women's Amateur to Mary Lena Faulk. She played on the U.S. Curtis Cup teams six times (1948, 1950, 1952, 1954, 1956, 1958) and was the captain in 1962.

She mistook golfer Ann Gregory for a maid at the Women's Amateur in Williamstown, Massachusetts in 1963.

== Amateur wins ==
this list is incomplete

- 1947 Women's Trans-Mississippi Amateur
- 1948 Women's Southern Amateur, Women's Trans-Mississippi Amateur
- 1950 Women's Southern Amateur, Women's Western Amateur
- 1951 Women's Southern Amateur
- 1952 Women's Western Amateur
- 1953 Women's Southern Amateur
- 1954 Women's Southern Amateur
- 1955 Women's Trans-Mississippi Amateur
- 1961 Women's Southern Amateur

== Professional wins (3) ==
=== LPGA Tour wins (1) ===
- 1950 Tampa Women's Open (as an amateur)

=== Other wins (2) ===
- 1948 Women's Texas Open (as an amateur)
- 1955 Women's Texas Open (as an amateur)

== Team appearances ==
Amateur

- Curtis Cup (representing the United States): 1948 (winners), 1950 (winners), 1952, 1954 (winners), 1956, 1958 (tie), 1962 (non-playing captain, winners)
