= Paige Mackenzie =

American professional golfer (born 1983)

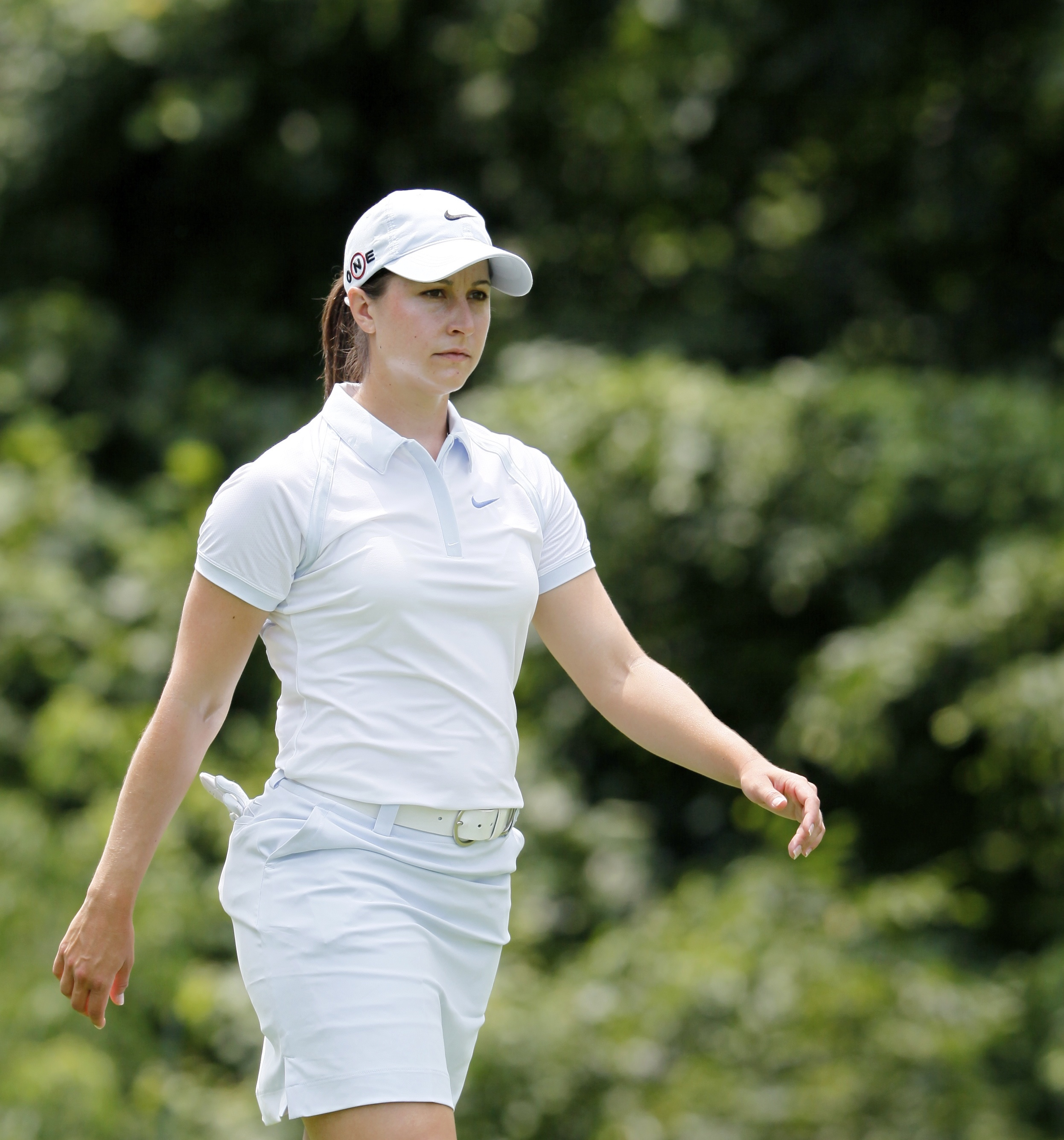
- Mackenzie at the 2009 LPGA Championship

Personal information
- Nationality: United States
- Born: February 8, 1983 (age 43) Yakima, Washington, U.S.
- Height: 5 ft 8 in (1.73 m)

Career
- Sport: Golf
- College: University of Washington
- Turned professional: 2006
- Former tour: LPGA Tour (joined 2007)

Best results in LPGA major championships
- Chevron Championship: T34: 2010
- Women's PGA C'ship: T20: 2011
- U.S. Women's Open: T13: 2005
- Women's British Open: CUT: 2008, 2010, 2011
- Evian Championship: T57: 2013

Paige Mackenzie (born February 8, 1983) is an American professional golfer who played on the LPGA Tour.

== Early years ==
Born and raised in Yakima, Washington, Mackenzie is a 2001 graduate of Eisenhower High School, where she was selected as a first-team All-Big-9 selection all four seasons. She was named the 2000 Girl Golfer of the Year for both the Washington Junior Golf Association and the Pacific Northwest Golf Association. By the time she graduated from high school, Mackenzie had posted five top-10 finishes in national tournaments, claiming one championship.

== Collegiate career ==
Mackenzie continued her successful amateur career at the University of Washington in Seattle, where she graduated in 2006 with a bachelor's degree in business. She recorded 22 top-10 finishes during her collegiate career, placing her first on the Huskies' all-time list. Among her numerous amateur awards and achievements, Mackenzie was T13 at the 2005 U.S. Women's Open, was named the 2005 Pacific Northwest Golf Association's Women's Player of the Year, and won both the match play and stroke play competitions of the 2005 Trans National Championship. Mackenzie was the 2006 Pac-10 and NCAA West Regional champion and finished her senior year ranked as the No. 1 amateur in the nation by Golfweek.

In the summer following graduation, Mackenzie lead the U.S. to 11½–6½ victory at the 2006 Curtis Cup at Bandon Dunes in southern Oregon, posting a 3-0-1 record with victories in both of her singles matches. A week later in northern Oregon, she was the medalist in the stroke play portion of the U.S. Women's Amateur at Pumpkin Ridge. Her last event as an amateur was at an LPGA Tour event, the Safeway Classic in Portland, where she tied for 45th place.

== Professional career ==
Mackenzie turned professional in late August 2006 and played two LPGA Tour events on sponsors' exemptions. She competed on the Cactus Tour in Arizona that fall and qualified for the 2007 Duramed Futures Tour, and then won exempt status for the 2007 LPGA Tour season with a T12 finish at the LPGA Final Qualifying Tournament in December 2006.

She carded three Top-25 finishes in her 2008 campaign, including a 23rd-place finish at the Corona Morelia Championship, a 22nd at the P&G Beauty NW Arkansas Championship and a T24 finish at the Safeway Classic. Mackenzie started 2008 by winning the Sharp Open on the Cactus Tour.

In April 2012, the National Association of Professional Women announced its partnership with Paige Mackenzie who become "NAPW Athletic Spokeswoman". Paige also starred a nationwide television ad campaign for that professional association during 2012.

== Results in LPGA majors ==
Tournament	2005	2006	2007	2008	2009	2010	2011	2012	2013
Kraft Nabisco Championship		CUT				T34	T57	CUT	T63
LPGA Championship			CUT	CUT	T23	CUT	T20	CUT	T37
U.S. Women's Open	T13	CUT				T55		64	
Women's British Open				CUT		CUT	CUT		
The Evian Championship ^									T57

^ The Evian Championship was added as a major in 2013.

Did not play

CUT = missed the half-way cut
"T" = tied

=== Summary ===
Tournament	Wins	2nd	3rd	Top-5	Top-10	Top-25	Events	Cuts made
Kraft Nabisco Championship	0	0	0	0	0	0	5	3
U.S. Women's Open	0	0	0	0	0	1	4	3
Women's PGA Championship	0	0	0	0	0	2	7	3
The Evian Championship	0	0	0	0	0	0	1	1
Women's British Open	0	0	0	0	0	0	3	0
Totals	0	0	0	0	0	4	20	10

- Most consecutive cuts made – 4 (2012 U.S. Open - 2013 Evian)
- Longest streak of top-10s – 0

== LPGA Tour career summary ==
Year	Tournaments played	Cuts made	Wins	2nd	3rd	Top 10s	Best finish	Earnings ($)	Money list rank	Scoring average	Scoring rank
2005	1	1	0	0	0	0	T13	n/a		73.25	n/a
2006	5^{1}	3	0	0	0	0	T23	12,046	n/a	73.29	n/a
2007	19	9	0	0	0	0	T17	49,104	118	73.87	106
2008	17	8	0	0	0	0	T22	78,807	120	73.11	97
2009	16	10	0	0	0	1	T8	140,671	69	72.23	45
2010	16	9	0	0	0	0	T34	58,988	93	73.54	98
2011	18	13	0	0	0	1	T9	184,384	47	72.60	46
2012	19	12	0	0	0	0	T22	94,045	80	73.53	93
2013	17	10	0	0	0	0	T23	63,685	97	72.39	64
2015	4	0	0	0	0	0	Cut	0	n/a	76.50	n/a

^{1} Mackenzie's first three of the five LPGA Tour events played in 2006 were as an amateur

- official through 2015 season

== Team appearances ==
Amateur

- Curtis Cup (representing the United States): 2006 (winners)
