= 2024 Curtis Cup =

Golf competition in Berkshire, England

43rd Curtis Cup Match
- Dates: 30 August – 1 September 2024
- Venue: Sunningdale Golf Club
- Location: Sunningdale, Berkshire, England
- Captains: Catriona Matthew (GB&I); Meghan Stasi (USA)
(United Kingdom) (Republic of Ireland)	10 1/2	9 1/2	(United States)
- Great Britain & Ireland wins the Curtis Cup

Location map
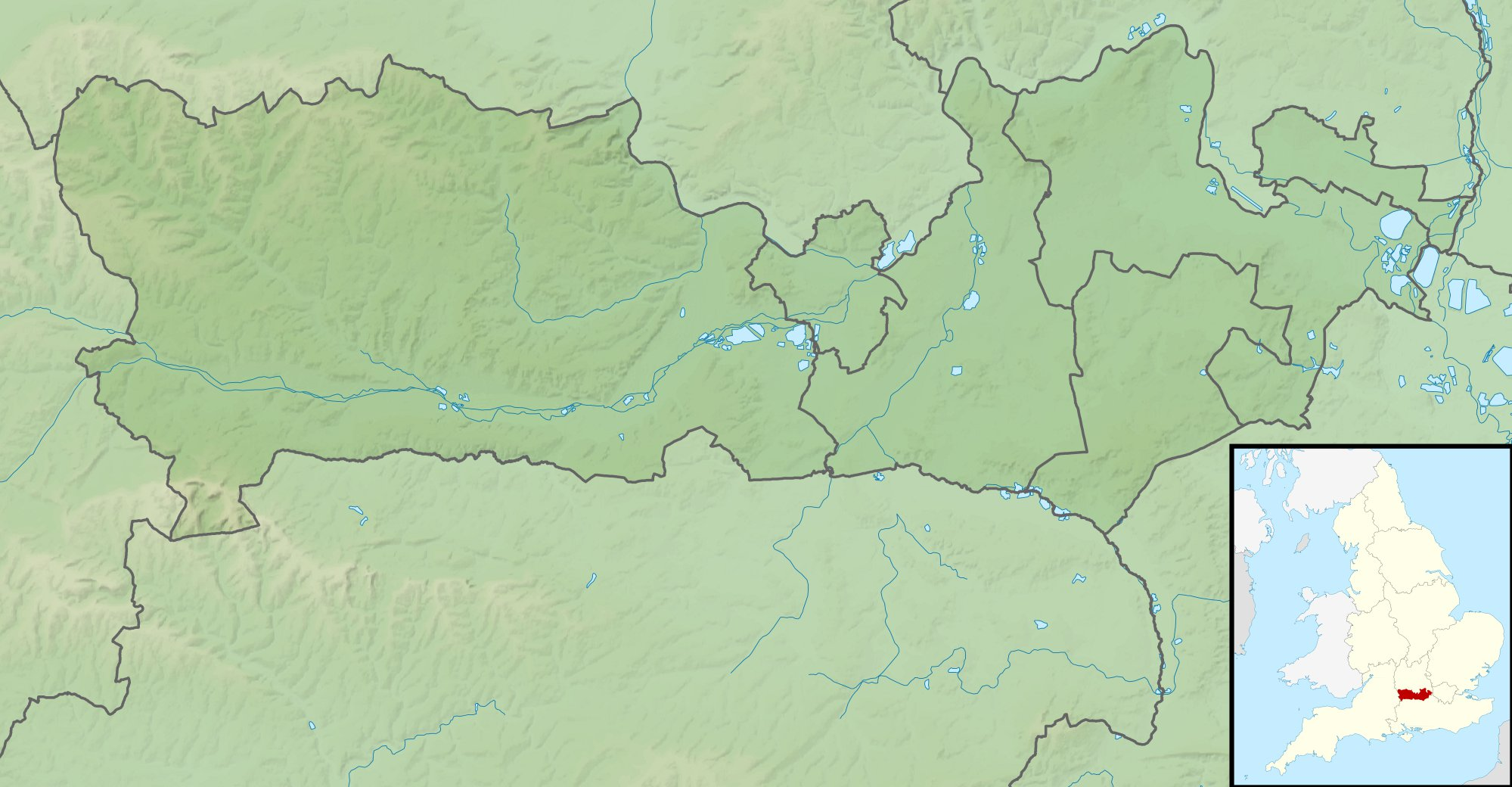
- Location in the United Kingdom Location in England Location in Berkshire

The 43rd Curtis Cup Match was played from 30 August to 1 September 2024 on the Old Course at Sunningdale Golf Club near Sunningdale, Berkshire, England. Great Britain and Ireland won 10 1/2 to 9 1/2.

== Unofficial match in 1930 ==
Although this was the first Curtis Cup match to be held at Sunningdale, an unofficial match between America and Britain was played there on 1 May 1930, two years before the first Curtis Cup match. The match was arranged by Glenna Collett and Molly Gourlay. The American team was selected from a group that had just arrived in England to play in the Women's Amateur Championship at Formby starting on 12 May. There were five foursomes matches followed by ten singles matches in the afternoon. The match was level after the foursomes, with each team winning two matches and one match halved. Britain won six of the ten singles matches to win the contest.

== Format ==
The contest was a three-day competition, with three foursomes and three fourball matches on each of the first two days, and eight singles matches on the final day, a total of 20 points.

Each of the 20 matches was worth one point in the larger team competition. If a match ended all square after the 18th hole extra holes were not played. Rather, each side earned 1/2 point toward their team total. The team that accumulated at least 10 1/2 points won the competition. In the event of a tie, the current holder retained the Cup.

== Teams ==
Eight players for Great Britain & Ireland and USA participated in the event plus one non-playing captain for each team.

The Great Britain & Ireland team was announced on 1 August 2024. The top five players from the World Amateur Golf Ranking were chosen, together with three selections. Mimi and Patience Rhodes are sisters.

& Great Britain & Ireland
Name	Age	Rank	Notes
(Scotland) Catriona Matthew	55	–	non-playing captain
(Republic of Ireland) Sara Byrne	23	49
(Republic of Ireland) Beth Coulter	20	74
(Scotland) Hannah Darling	21	30	played in 2021 and 2022
(Republic of Ireland) Aine Donegan	22	78
(Scotland) Lorna McClymont	23	95	2024 Scottish Women's Amateur champion
(England) Mimi Rhodes	22	84
(England) Patience Rhodes	20	101
(England) Lottie Woad	20	1

Zoe Campos, Catherine Park and Jasmine Koo were the first players to make the American team, as the three highest-ranked Americans in the World Amateur Golf Ranking (WAGR) on 10 July 2024. The rest of the team was announced on 12 August.

USA
Name	Age	Rank	Notes
Meghan Stasi	46	–	non-playing captain
Zoe Campos	21	4
Anna Davis	18	16
Melanie Green	22	32	2024 Women's Amateur champion
Jasmine Koo	18	6
Rachel Kuehn	23	10	played in 2021 and 2022
Catherine Park	20	7
Megan Schofill	23	24
Asterisk Talley	15	39

Note: "Rank" is the World Amateur Golf Ranking as of the start of the Cup.

== Friday's matches ==
=== Morning foursomes ===
&	Results
P. Rhodes/M. Rhodes	(United States) 6 & 4	Green/Kuehn
Donegan/Coulter	halved	Koo/Campos
Woad/Byrne	halved	Park/Talley
1	Session	2
1	Overall	2

=== Afternoon fourballs ===
&	Results
Darling/Donegan	(United Kingdom) (Republic of Ireland) 1 up	Davis/Schofill
M. Rhodes/McClymont	(United States) 5 & 4	Koo/Talley
Woad/Byrne	(United Kingdom) (Republic of Ireland) 2 & 1	Park/Campos
2	Session	1
3	Overall	3

== Saturday's matches ==
=== Morning foursomes ===
&	Results
Woad/Byrne	halved	Green/Kuehn
Darling/Donegan	(United Kingdom) (Republic of Ireland) 1 up	Davis/Schofill
Coulter/P. Rhodes	(United States) 2 & 1	Park/Campos
1 1/2	Session	1 1/2
4 1/2	Overall	4 1/2

=== Afternoon fourballs ===
&	Results
Darling/M. Rhodes	(United Kingdom) (Republic of Ireland) 3 & 2	Koo/Talley
McClymont/Coulter	(United Kingdom) (Republic of Ireland) 2 & 1	Davis/Green
Woad/Byrne	halved	Kuehn/Schofill
2 1/2	Session	1/2
7	Overall	5

== Sunday's singles matches ==
&	Results
Lottie Woad	(United States) 3 & 2	Asterisk Talley
Sara Byrne	(United Kingdom) (Republic of Ireland) 3 & 2	Catherine Park
Hannah Darling	(United States) 3 & 2	Anna Davis
Patience Rhodes	(United Kingdom) (Republic of Ireland) 6 & 5	Zoe Campos
Mimi Rhodes	halved	Melanie Green
Beth Coulter	(United States) 4 & 3	Jasmine Koo
Lorna McClymont	(United Kingdom) (Republic of Ireland) 3 & 2	Megan Schofill
Aine Donegan	(United States) 3 & 2	Rachel Kuehn
3 1/2	Session	4 1/2
10 1/2	Overall	9 1/2
