= Hannah O'Sullivan =

American golfer (born 1998)

Personal information
- Full name: Hannah Sarah O'Sullivan
- Nationality: United States
- Born: May 11, 1998 (age 28) Singapore
- Height: 5 ft 8 in (173 cm)

Career
- Sport: Golf
- College: Duke University
- Status: Amateur
- Professional wins: 1

Number of wins by tour
- Epson Tour: 1

Best results in LPGA major championships
- Chevron Championship: T65: 2016
- Women's PGA C'ship: DNP
- U.S. Women's Open: T53: 2015
- Women's British Open: CUT: 2016
- Evian Championship: T50: 2015

Hannah Sarah O'Sullivan (born May 11, 1998) is an American amateur golfer.

== Career ==
O'Sullivan was raised in Chandler, Arizona. She attended Hamilton High School.

In 2014, O'Sullivan was a semifinalist at the U.S. Women's Amateur. Her win at the 2015 Gateway Classic makes her the youngest winner in the history of the Symetra Tour. O'Sullivan also qualified for the 2015 U.S. Women's Open. She then won the 2015 U.S. Women's Amateur. In May 2016, O'Sullivan became the top female golfer in the World Amateur Golf Ranking.

O'Sullivan played college golf at Duke University.

== Amateur wins ==
- 2010 Stockton Sports Commission Junior Open
- 2015 Winn Grips Heather Farr Classic, Rolex Girls Junior Championship, Rolex Tournament of Champions, U.S. Women's Amateur

== Professional wins (1) ==
=== Symetra Tour wins (1) ===
- 2015 Gateway Classic (as an amateur)

== Team appearances ==
Amateur

- Junior Ryder Cup (representing the United States): 2014 (winners)
- Junior Solheim Cup (representing the United States): 2015 (winners)
- Curtis Cup (representing the United States): 2016
