= 1952 Curtis Cup =

Golf competition in Gullane, East Lothian, Scotland

Coordinates: 56.042°N 2.821°W

7th Curtis Cup Match
- Dates: 6–7 June 1952
- Venue: Muirfield
- Location: Scotland
- Captains: Katharine Cairns (British Isles); Aniela Goldthwaite (USA)
(United Kingdom) (Republic of Ireland)	5	4	(United States)
- British Isles wins the Curtis Cup

The 7th Curtis Cup Match was played on 6 and 7 June 1952 at Muirfield in Scotland. The British Isles won by 5 matches to 4, to win the Curtis Cup for the first time.

The British Isles won two of the three foursomes matches and tied the singles to win by five matches to four.

== Format ==
The contest was played over two days, with three foursomes on the first day and six singles matches on the second day, a total of 9 points. Matches were over 36 holes.

Each of the 9 matches was worth one point in the larger team competition. If a match was all square after the 18th hole extra holes were not played. Rather, each side earned 1/2 a point toward their team total. The team that accumulated at least 5 points won the competition.

== Teams ==
& British Isles
Name	Notes
(England) Katharine Cairns	non-playing captain
(England) Jeanne Bisgood	played in 1950
(Scotland) Jean Donald	played in 1948 and 1950
(Republic of Ireland) Philomena Garvey	played in 1948 and 1950
(Republic of Ireland) Kitty MacCann
(Scotland) Moira Paterson
(England) Elizabeth Price	played in 1950
(England) Frances Stephens	played in 1950
(Scotland) Jessie Valentine	played in 1936, 1938 and 1950

MacCann did not play in any matches

United States
Name	Notes
Aniela Goldthwaite	non-playing captain, played in 1934 and 1936
Grace DeMoss
Claire Doran
Dorothy Kirby	played in 1948 and 1950
Marjorie Lindsay
Mae Murray
Patricia O'Sullivan
Polly Riley	played in 1948 and 1950

== Friday's foursomes matches ==
&	Results
Donald/Price	(United Kingdom) (Republic of Ireland) 3 & 2	Kirby/DeMoss
Stephens/Valentine	(United States) 6 & 4	Doran/Lindsay
Paterson/Garvey	(United Kingdom) (Republic of Ireland) 2 & 1	Riley/O'Sullivan
2	Session	1
2	Overall	1

18-hole scores: Donald/Price 4 up, Doran/Lindsay 6 up, Paterson/Garvey 1 up

== Saturday's singles matches ==
&	Results
Jean Donald	(United States) 1 up	Dorothy Kirby
Frances Stephens	(United Kingdom) (Republic of Ireland) 2 & 1	Marjorie Lindsay
Moira Paterson	(United States) 6 & 4	Polly Riley
Jeanne Bisgood	(United Kingdom) (Republic of Ireland) 6 & 5	Mae Murray
Philomena Garvey	(United States) 3 & 2	Claire Doran
Elizabeth Price	(United Kingdom) (Republic of Ireland) 3 & 2	Grace DeMoss
3	Session	3
5	Overall	4

18-hole scores: Donald 2 up, Stephens/Lindsay all square, Riley 4 up, Bisgood 4 up, Garvey 2 up, Price 1 up
