= Tacoma Country and Golf Club =

Coordinates: 47°08′01″N 122°32′07″W

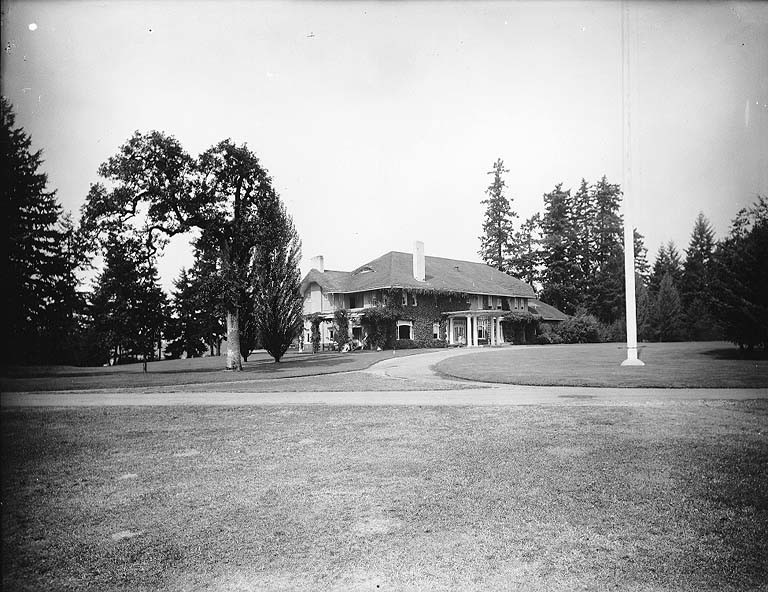
Tacoma Country and Golf Club clubhouse about 1910

Tacoma Country and Golf Club is a private golf course and country club in Tacoma, Washington. Created in 1894, it had the first golf course in the Western United States not on a military reservation (the Mare Island course opened in 1892), and is the oldest continuously operating golf club in the West.
