= Brooke Pancake =

American professional golfer (born 1990)

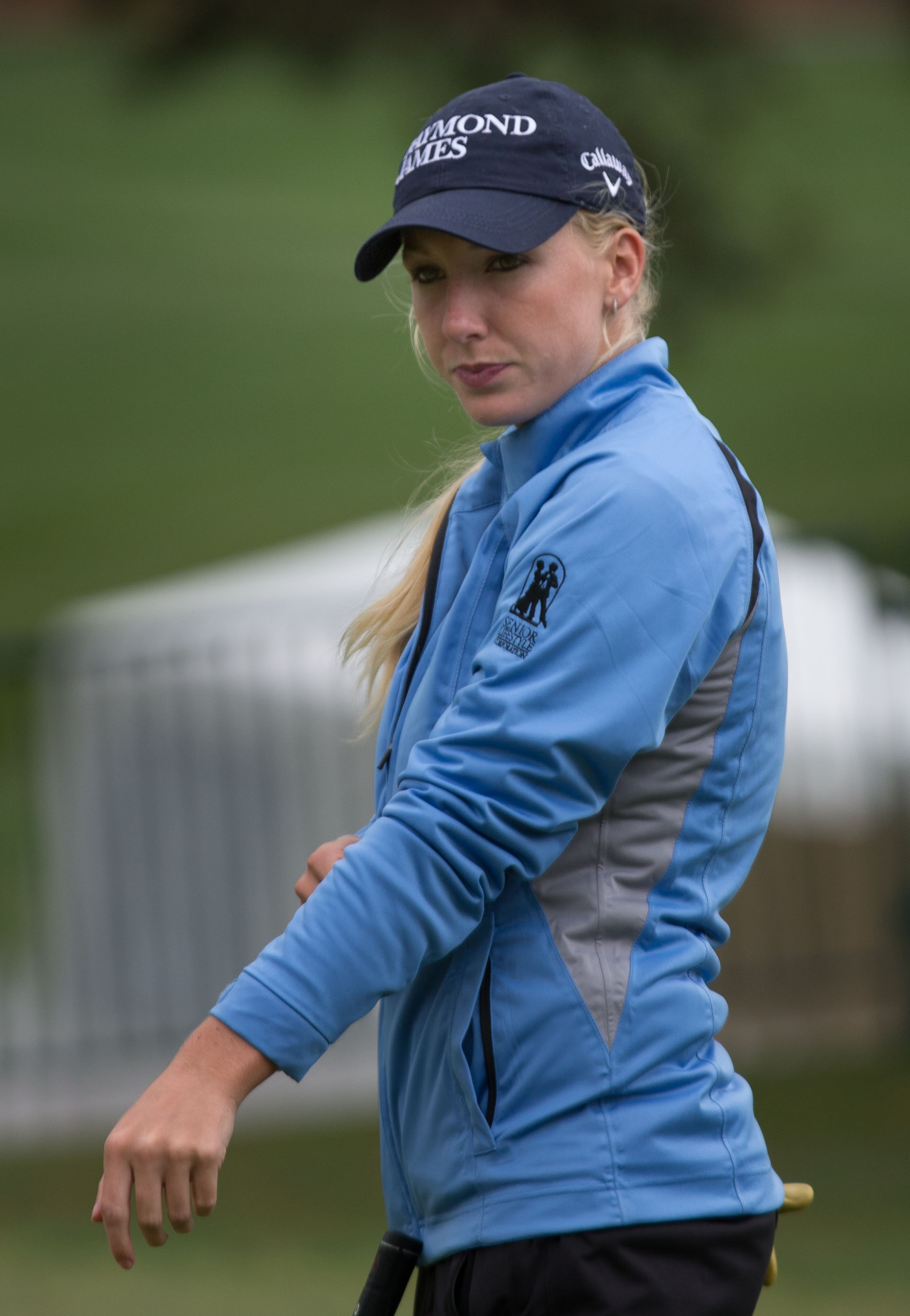

Personal information
- Nationality: United States
- Born: June 6, 1990 (age 36) Chattanooga, Tennessee, U.S.
- Height: 5 ft 7 in (1.70 m)

Career
- Sport: Golf
- College: University of Alabama
- Turned professional: 2012
- Current tour: LPGA Tour (2012–present)

Best results in LPGA major championships
- Chevron Championship: DNP
- Women's PGA C'ship: T53: 2014
- U.S. Women's Open: CUT: 2012, 2013, 2014, 2015
- Women's British Open: CUT: 2014
- Evian Championship: CUT: 2013, 2014

Achievements and awards
- Honda Sports Award: 2012

Brooke Pancake (born June 6, 1990) is an American professional golfer. She became a member of the LPGA Tour in 2012 after she led the Alabama Crimson Tide golf team to the 2012 national championship. Pancake was a three-time All-American at Alabama and turned pro following her senior season in June 2012.

== Amateur career ==
As a member of the Crimson Tide, Pancake played for head coach Mic Potter. During her sophomore year, she was a member of the first Alabama squad to capture the Southeastern Conference (SEC) championship in women's golf since the inception of the program in 1974. Prior to the start of her senior year, Pancake lost in the semifinals of the U.S. Women's Amateur at Rhode Island Country Club to Danielle Kang.

During her senior season, Pancake led the Crimson Tide to their first overall national championship in 2012. At the championship, Pancake finished second individually with a 72-hole score of 2-under-par at 286. In recognition of her accomplishments on the course, Pancake won the Honda Sports Award as the top collegiate golfer for the 2011–12 academic year. She was also recognized as an All-American for her play during her final three years with the Crimson Tide.

== Professional career ==
After she completed her senior season at Alabama, Pancake turned pro in June 2012. She made her professional debut at the 2012 U.S. Women's Open where she missed the cut. In June 2013, Pancake had her best finish as a professional at the Walmart NW Arkansas Championship when she came in tied at 13th.

She is sponsored by Waffle House.

== Awards and honors ==
- In 2010, she earned the Elite 89 Award, given to the student-athlete with the top GPA who has reached the finals site of their sport.
- In 2011 and 2012, she was awarded the Edith Cummings Munson Golf Award, an international award given a female student-athlete who excels in academics.
- She won the SEC's Women's Golf Scholar-Athlete of the Year three times: in 2010, 2011, and 2012.
- In 2012, she won the Honda Sports Award, bestowed to the top female student-athlete in their respective sport.
- After the 2012 season, Pancake was recognized as the Academic All-America Team Member of the Year, the top student-sportsperson for her senior year. She was both the first athlete from Alabama and first female golfer to be recognized with the award.

== Results in LPGA majors ==
Results not in chronological order before 2015.

Tournament	2012	2013	2014	2015	2016	2017
ANA Inspiration						
Women's PGA Championship			T53	CUT		CUT
U.S. Women's Open	CUT	CUT	CUT	CUT		
Women's British Open			CUT			
The Evian Championship ^		CUT	CUT			

^ The Evian Championship was added as a major in 2013.

Did not play

CUT = missed the half-way cut
T = tied

== Team appearances ==
Amateur

- Curtis Cup (representing the United States): 2012
