= 2010 Curtis Cup =

Golf competition in Manchester-by-the-Sea, Massachusetts

Coordinates: 42.585°N 70.767°W

36th Curtis Cup Match
- Dates: June 11–13, 2010
- Venue: Essex County Club
- Location: Manchester-by-the-Sea, Massachusetts
- Captains: Noreen Mohler (USA); Mary McKenna (GB&I)
(United States)	12 1/2	7 1/2	(United Kingdom) (Republic of Ireland)
- United States wins the Curtis Cup

The 36th Curtis Cup Match was played from June 11 to 13, 2010 at Essex County Club in Manchester-by-the-Sea, Massachusetts. The United States won 12 1/2 to 7 1/2. The Great Britain and Ireland team led 3 1/2 to 2 1/2 after the first day but the Americans won all 6 matches on the second day and, with the singles matches being shared, won comfortably. The Great Britain and Ireland team included 15-year-old twins, Lisa and Leona Maguire.

== Format ==
The contest was a three-day competition, with three foursomes and three fourball matches on each of the first two days, and eight singles matches on the final day, a total of 20 points.

Each of the 20 matches is worth one point in the larger team competition. If a match is all square after the 18th hole extra holes are not played. Rather, each side earns 1/2 a point toward their team total. The team that accumulates at least 10 1/2 points wins the competition. In the event of a tie, the current holder retains the Cup.

== Teams ==
Eight players for the USA and Great Britain & Ireland participated in the event plus one non-playing captain for each team.

The American team was selected by the USGA’s International Team Selection Committee.

Team USA
Name	Age	Notes
Noreen Mohler	52	non-playing captain
Cydney Clanton	20
Jennifer Johnson	18
Kimberly Kim	18	played in 2008
Stephanie Kono	20
Jessica Korda	17
Tiffany Lua	19
Jennifer Song	20
Lexi Thompson	15

The Great Britain & Ireland team was selected by the LGU in April 2010.

& Great Britain & Ireland
Name	Age	Notes
(Republic of Ireland) Mary McKenna	61	non-playing captain
(England) Hannah Barwood	19
(England) Holly Clyburn	19
(England) Rachel Jennings	21
(Republic of Ireland) Leona Maguire	15
(Republic of Ireland) Lisa Maguire	15
(Northern Ireland) Danielle McVeigh	22
(Scotland) Pamela Pretswell	20
(Scotland) Sally Watson	18	played in 2008

== Friday's matches ==
=== Morning foursomes ===
&	Results
Watson/Jennings	halved	Song/Johnson
Barwood/Clyburn	halved	Thompson/Korda
McVeigh/Leona Maguire	halved	Clanton/Kono
1 1/2	Session	1 1/2
1 1/2	Overall	1 1/2

=== Afternoon fourballs ===
&	Results
McVeigh/Pretswell	(United Kingdom) (Republic of Ireland) 4 & 3	Song/Kim
Jennings/Leona Maguire	(United States) 3 & 2	Thompson/Johnson
Watson/Lisa Maguire	(United Kingdom) (Republic of Ireland) 1 up	Korda/Lua
2	Session	1
3 1/2	Overall	2 1/2

== Saturday's matches ==
=== Morning fourballs ===
&	Results
McVeigh/Prestwell	(United States) 2 & 1	Thompson/Korda
Leona Maguire/Lisa Maguire	(United States) 3 & 2	Song/Clanton
Watson/Jennings	(United States) 2 up	Kono/Kim
0	Session	3
3 1/2	Overall	5 1/2

=== Afternoon foursomes ===
&	Results
McVeigh/Leona Maguire	(United States) 3 & 1	Thompson/Korda
Barwood/Clyburn	(United States) 3 & 1	Song/Kono
Watson/Jennings	(United States) 3 & 2	Lua/Johnson
0	Session	3
3 1/2	Overall	8 1/2

== Sunday's singles matches ==
&	Results
Danielle McVeigh	(United Kingdom) (Republic of Ireland) 3 & 2	Jennifer Song
Sally Watson	(United States) 6 & 5	Lexi Thompson
Rachel Jennings	(United States) 5 & 4	Jennifer Johnson
Lisa Maguire	(United Kingdom) (Republic of Ireland) 1 up	Kimberly Kim
Hannah Barwood	(United States) 4 & 3	Cydney Clanton
Leona Maguire	(United Kingdom) (Republic of Ireland) 2 & 1	Tiffany Lua
Pamela Prestwell	(United States) 4 & 3	Jessica Korda
Holly Clyburn	(United Kingdom) (Republic of Ireland) 2 & 1	Stephanie Kono
4	Session	3
7 1/2	Overall	12 1/2
