= 2018 Curtis Cup =

Golf competition in Scarsdale, New York

Coordinates: 40.966°N 73.762°W

40th Curtis Cup Match
- Dates: June 8–10, 2018
- Venue: Quaker Ridge Golf Club
- Location: Scarsdale, New York
- Captains: Virginia Derby Grimes (USA); Elaine Farquharson-Black (GB&I)
(United States)	17	3	(United Kingdom) (Republic of Ireland)
- United States wins the Curtis Cup

The 40th Curtis Cup Match was played from June 8–10, 2018 at Quaker Ridge Golf Club, Scarsdale, New York. The United States dominated the match, winning by 17 matches to 3 including all 8 of the singles matches.

== Format ==
The contest was a three-day competition, with three foursomes and three fourball matches on each of the first two days, and eight singles matches on the final day, a total of 20 points.

Each of the 20 matches is worth one point in the larger team competition. If a match is all square after the 18th hole, extra holes are not played. Rather, each side earns 1/2 a point toward their team total. The team that accumulates at least 10 1/2 points wins the competition. In the event of a tie, the current holder retains the Cup.

== Teams ==
Eight players for the USA and Great Britain & Ireland participated in the event plus one non-playing captain for each team.

The American team was selected by the USGA’s International Team Selection Committee.

Team USA
Name	Age	Rank	Notes
Virginia Derby Grimes	54	–	non-playing captain
Mariel Galdiano	19	22	played in 2016
Kristen Gillman	20	8
Jennifer Kupcho	20	2
Andrea Lee	19	5	played in 2016
Lucy Li	15	9
Sophia Schubert	22	15
Lauren Stephenson	20	6
Lilia Vu	20	1

Two members of the Great Britain & Ireland team were selected automatically, the top two in the World Amateur Golf Ranking (WAGR) as of April 25, 2018. The remaining six were picked by the R&A Women's Selection Committee. Leona Maguire, second in the world rankings, ruled herself out, as she intended to turn professional before the event.

& Great Britain & Ireland
Name	Age	Rank	Notes
(Scotland) Elaine Farquharson-Black	50	–	non-playing captain
(England) India Clyburn	21	96
(England) Annabell Fuller	15	98
(Northern Ireland) Paula Grant	24	69
(England) Alice Hewson	20	33	played in 2016
(England) Lily May Humphreys	16	67
(England) Sophie Lamb	20	73
(Scotland) Shannon McWilliam	18	204
(Northern Ireland) Olivia Mehaffey	20	16	played in 2016

Note: "Rank" is the World Amateur Golf Ranking as of the start of the Cup.

== Friday's matches ==
=== Morning fourballs ===
&	Results
Mehaffey/Lamb	halved	Kupcho/Li
Hewson/Humphreys	(United States) 4 & 3	Vu/Gillman
Grant/McWilliam	halved	Stephenson/Schubert
1	Session	2
1	Overall	2

=== Afternoon foursomes ===
&	Results
Mehaffey/Lamb	(United Kingdom) (Republic of Ireland) 3 & 2	Galdiano/Lee
Hewson/Clyburn	(United States) 2 up	Kupcho/Vu
Grant/Humphreys	(United States) 4 & 2	Stephenson/Gillman
1	Session	2
2	Overall	4

== Saturday's matches ==
=== Morning fourballs ===
&	Results
Mehaffey/Lamb	(United States) 3 & 2	Kupcho/Gillman
Hewson/Fuller	(United States) 2 & 1	Galdiano/Vu
Humphreys/McWilliam	(United States) 3 & 2	Li/Lee
0	Session	3
2	Overall	7

=== Afternoon foursomes ===
&	Results
Mehaffey/Lamb	(United Kingdom) (Republic of Ireland) 2 & 1	Kupcho/Vu
Fuller/Clyburn	(United States) 6 & 5	Gillman/Stephenson
Grant/McWilliam	(United States) 7 & 5	Li/Schubert
1	Session	2
3	Overall	9

== Sunday's singles matches ==
&	Results
Olivia Mehaffey	(United States) 2 & 1	Sophia Schubert
Sophie Lamb	(United States) 2 up	Lilia Vu
Lily May Humphreys	(United States) 2 & 1	Jennifer Kupcho
Alice Hewson	(United States) 2 & 1	Andrea Lee
Shannon McWilliam	(United States) 2 & 1	Lauren Stephenson
Annabell Fuller	(United States) 5 & 4	Kristen Gillman
India Clyburn	(United States) 5 & 4	Lucy Li
Paula Grant	(United States) 1 up	Mariel Galdiano
0	Session	8
3	Overall	17
