= 1950 Curtis Cup =

Golf competition in Williamsville, New York

Coordinates: 42°57′40″N 78°48′33″W

6th Curtis Cup Match
- Dates: September 4–5, 1950
- Venue: Country Club of Buffalo
- Location: Williamsville, New York
- Captains: Glenna Collett Vare (USA); Diana Critchley (British Isles)
(United States)	7 1/2	1 1/2	(United Kingdom) (Republic of Ireland)
- United States wins the Curtis Cup

The 6th Curtis Cup Match was played on September 4 and 5, 1950 at the Country Club of Buffalo in Williamsville, New York. The United States won 7 1/2 to 1 1/2.

Matches were played over 36 holes for the first time. The United States won two of the three foursomes matches and won five and halved the other match in the singles.

== Format ==
The contest was played over two days, with three foursomes on the first day and six singles matches on the second day, a total of 9 points. Matches were over 36 holes.

Each of the 9 matches was worth one point in the larger team competition. If a match was all square after the 18th hole extra holes were not played. Rather, each side earned 1/2 a point toward their team total. The team that accumulated at least 5 points won the competition.

== Teams ==
United States
Name	Notes
Glenna Collett Vare	non-playing captain, played in 1932, 1936, 1938 and 1948
Beverly Hanson
Dorothy Kielty	played in 1948
Dorothy Kirby	played in 1948
Peggy Kirk
Grace Lenczyk	played in 1948
Dorothy Porter
Polly Riley	played in 1948
Helen Sigel

& British Isles
Name	Notes
(England) Diana Critchley	playing captain, played in 1932, 1934 and 1948
(England) Jeanne Bisgood
(Scotland) Jean Donald	played in 1948
(Republic of Ireland) Philomena Garvey	played in 1948
(England) Elizabeth Price
(England) Frances Stephens
(Scotland) Jessie Valentine	played in 1936 and 1938

Diana Critchley did not select herself for any matches.

== Monday's foursomes matches ==
&	Results
Donald/Valentine	(United States) 3 & 2	Porter/Hanson
Stephens/Price	(United Kingdom) (Republic of Ireland) 1 up	Sigel/Kirk
Garvey/Bisgood	(United States) 6 & 5	Kielty/Kirby
1	Session	2
1	Overall	2

18-hole scores: Donald/Valentine 1 up, Stephens/Price 4 up, Kielty/Kirby 2 up

== Tuesday's singles matches ==
&	Results
Frances Stephens	halved	Dorothy Porter
Jessie Valentine	(United States) 7 & 6	Polly Riley
Jean Donald	(United States) 6 & 5	Beverly Hanson
Philomena Garvey	(United States) 3 & 1	Dorothy Kielty
Jeanne Bisgood	(United States) 1 up	Peggy Kirk
Elizabeth Price	(United States) 5 & 4	Grace Lenczyk
1/2	Session	5 1/2
1 1/2	Overall	7 1/2

18-hole scores: Porter 1 up, Riley 5 up, Hanson 4 up, Kielty 5 up, Bisgood/Kirk all square, Price/Lenczyk all square
