= 2016 Curtis Cup =

Golf competition in Enniskerry, Ireland

Coordinates: 53.211°N 6.161°W

39th Curtis Cup Match
- Dates: 10–12 June 2016
- Venue: Dun Laoghaire Golf Club
- Location: Enniskerry, Ireland
- Captains: Elaine Farquharson-Black (GB&I); Robin Burke (USA)
(United Kingdom) (Republic of Ireland)	11 1/2	8 1/2	(United States)
- Great Britain & Ireland wins the Curtis Cup

The 39th Curtis Cup Match was played from 10 to 12 June 2016 at Dun Laoghaire Golf Club near Enniskerry, Ireland. Great Britain and Ireland won 11 1/2 to 8 1/2. Bronte Law became the first golfer from Great Britain and Ireland to win 5 matches in a Curtis Cup match, a feat only previously achieved by Stacy Lewis in 2008.

== Format ==
The contest was a three-day competition, with three foursomes and three fourball matches on each of the first two days, and eight singles matches on the final day, a total of 20 points.

Each of the 20 matches is worth one point in the larger team competition. If a match is all square after the 18th hole extra holes are not played. Rather, each side earns 1/2 a point toward their team total. The team that accumulates at least 10 1/2 points wins the competition. In the event of a tie, the current holder retains the Cup.

== Teams ==
Eight players for the Great Britain & Ireland and USA participated in the event plus one non-playing captain for each team.

Six members of the Great Britain & Ireland team were selected automatically, the top four in the World Amateur Golf Ranking (WAGR) as of 27 April 2016 and the leading two players in the LGU’s Order of Merit not selected from the WAGR. The remaining two were picked by the LGU Selection Panel.

& Great Britain & Ireland
Name	Age	Notes
(Scotland) Elaine Farquharson-Black	48	non-playing captain
(Republic of Ireland) Maria Dunne	32	Selection Panel Pick
(England) Alice Hewson	18	WAGR
(England) Bronte Law	21	WAGR, played in 2012 and 2014
(England) Meghan MacLaren	21	LGU Order of Merit
(Republic of Ireland) Leona Maguire	21	WAGR, played in 2010 and 2012
(Northern Ireland) Olivia Mehaffey	18	WAGR
(England) Rochelle Morris	20	LGU Order of Merit
(England) Charlotte Thomas	23	Selection Panel Pick, played in 2014

The American team was selected by the USGA’s International Team Selection Committee. American captain Robin Burke is married to Jack Burke Jr.

Team USA
Name	Age	Notes
Robin Burke	53	non-playing captain
Sierra Brooks	17
Mariel Galdiano	17
Andrea Lee	17
Mika Liu	17
Hannah O'Sullivan	18
Bailey Tardy	19
Monica Vaughn	21
Bethany Wu	19

== Friday's matches ==
=== Morning foursomes ===
&	Results
Law/Mehaffey	(United Kingdom) (Republic of Ireland) 2 & 1	O'Sullivan/Galdiano
Thomas/Maguire	(United Kingdom) (Republic of Ireland) 4 & 2	Lee/Liu
MacLaren/Dunne	(United States) 1 up	Tardy/Vaughn
2	Session	1
2	Overall	1

=== Afternoon fourballs ===
&	Results
Maguire/Law	(United Kingdom) (Republic of Ireland) 4 & 3	Wu/Brooks
Mehaffey/Thomas	(United States) 1 up	O'Sullivan/Galdiano
MacLaren/Hewson	(United States) 2 & 1	Tardy/Vaughn
1	Session	2
3	Overall	3

== Saturday's matches ==
=== Morning foursomes ===
&	Results
Maguire/Thomas	(United States) 1 up	Wu/O'Sullivan
MacLaren/Dunne	(United Kingdom) (Republic of Ireland) 1 up	Brooks/Lee
Mehaffey/Law	(United Kingdom) (Republic of Ireland) 3 & 2	Tardy/Vaughn
2	Session	1
5	Overall	4

=== Afternoon fourballs ===
&	Results
Mehaffey/Law	(United Kingdom) (Republic of Ireland) 3 & 2	Vaughn/Wu
MacLaren/Dunne	(United Kingdom) (Republic of Ireland) 3 & 2	Tardy/Galdiano
Maguire/Thomas	(United Kingdom) (Republic of Ireland) 5 & 4	O'Sullivan/Liu
3	Session	0
8	Overall	4

== Sunday's singles matches ==
&	Results
Olivia Mehaffey	halved	Hannah O'Sullivan
Charlotte Thomas	(United States) 4 & 3	Bailey Tardy
Leona Maguire	(United Kingdom) (Republic of Ireland) 3 & 2	Sierra Brooks
Rochelle Morris	(United States) 4 & 3	Monica Vaughn
Alice Hewson	(United States) 2 & 1	Andrea Lee
Bronte Law	(United Kingdom) (Republic of Ireland) 2 up	Mika Liu
Meghan MacLaren	(United Kingdom) (Republic of Ireland) 2 & 1	Bethany Wu
Maria Dunne	(United States) 2 & 1	Mariel Galdiano
3 1/2	Session	4 1/2
11 1/2	Overall	8 1/2
