= Dorothy Kirby =

American golfer and sportscaster

Personal information
- Full name: Mary Dorothy Kirby
- Nationality: United States
- Born: January 15, 1920 West Point, Georgia, U.S.
- Died: December 12, 2000 (aged 80) Atlanta, Georgia, U.S.

Career
- Sport: Golf
- Status: Amateur
- Professional wins: 2

Number of wins by tour
- LPGA Tour: 2

Best results in LPGA major championships (wins: 2)
- Western Open: 2nd: 1943, 1947
- Titleholders C'ship: Won: 1941, 1942
- U.S. Women's Open: 7th: 1951

Mary Dorothy Kirby (January 15, 1920 – December 12, 2000) was an American professional golfer and sportscaster.

Born in West Point, Georgia, her family moved to Atlanta when she was ten. At the age of 13, Kirby's victory at the 1933 Georgia Women's Amateur Championship made her the youngest female golfer to ever win a state championship. It marked the first of her six Georgia championships, her last coming 20 years later in 1953. As well, she defeated amateurs and professionals in winning back-to-back Titleholders Championship in 1941–42. In 1943 she won the North and South Women's Amateur at Pinehurst.

She attended Washington Seminary in Atlanta, Georgia, from 1934 to 1938. Her senior caption reads: "Dot Kirby was voted 'Most Athletic Senior.' She has played class basketball and volleyball since 1935, and in '36-'37 she was captain of both teams. A member of the "A" [Athletic] Club since her sophomore year, she was elected vice-president in her senior year. In 1935 she held the responsible office of class treasurer. She was a member of the Varsity in 1935, a cheerleader in 1938. Dot is sports editor of Facts and Fancies [school yearbook]."

Dorothy Kirby played in her first U.S. Women's Amateur in 1934 at age fourteen. She was the runner-up to Betty Jameson in 1939 and to Louise Suggs in 1947 then won the most prestigious women's event in 1951. Attempting to defend her title, in 1952 she had the lowest round of the tournament but was still knocked out early. Dorothy Kirby was a member of four U.S. Curtis Cup teams (1948, 1950, 1952, 1954), and despite her success as an amateur, she chose not to join the professional LPGA Tour.

Dorothy Kirby retired from competition in the mid-1950s and worked as a radio and television sportscaster and sales representative for thirty-five years. In 1974 she was inducted into the Georgia Sports Hall of Fame and the Georgia Golf Hall of Fame in 1989.

She died in Atlanta in 2000.

== Amateur wins ==
- 1933 Georgia Women's Amateur
- 1935 Georgia Women's Amateur
- 1936 Georgia Women's Amateur
- 1937 Southern Women's Amateur
- 1941 Georgia Women's Amateur
- 1943 North and South Women's Amateur
- 1951 U.S. Women's Amateur
- 1952 Georgia Women's Amateur
- 1953 Georgia Women's Amateur

== Major championships ==
=== Wins (2) ===
Year	Championship	Winning score	Margin	Runner-up
1941	Titleholders Championship	−1 (80-72-72=224)	16 strokes	(United States) Helen Sigel
1942	Titleholders Championship	+14 (79-77-83=239)	5 strokes	(United States) Eileen Stulb

== Team appearances ==
Amateur

- Curtis Cup (representing the United States): 1948 (winners), 1950 (winners), 1952, 1954 (winners)
