= 1962 Curtis Cup =

Golf competition in Colorado Springs, Colorado

Coordinates: 38.789°N 104.850°W

12th Curtis Cup Match
- Dates: August 17–18, 1962
- Venue: Broadmoor Golf Club
- Location: Colorado Springs, Colorado
- Captains: Polly Riley (USA); Frances Stephens (British Isles)
(United States)	8	1	(United Kingdom) (Republic of Ireland)
- United States wins the Curtis Cup

The 12th Curtis Cup Match was played on August 17 and 18, 1962 at the Broadmoor Golf Club in Colorado Springs, Colorado. The United States won by 8 matches to 1, to retain the trophy.

The United States won all three foursomes matches and five of the six singles matches to win the contest. This was the last Curtis Cup in which 36-hole matches were played.

== Format ==
The contest was played over two days, with three foursomes on the first day and six singles matches on the second day, a total of 9 points. Matches were over 36 holes.

Each of the 9 matches was worth one point in the larger team competition. If a match was all square after the 18th hole extra holes were not played. Rather, each side earned 1/2 a point toward their team total. The team that accumulated at least 5 points won the competition.

== Teams ==
United States
Name	Notes
Polly Riley	non-playing captain
Jean Ashley
Judy Bell	played in 1960
Clifford Ann Creed
Anne Decker	played in 1958 and 1960
JoAnne Gunderson	played in 1958 and 1960
Ann Casey Johnstone	played in 1958 and 1960
Barbara McIntire	played in 1958 and 1960
Phyllis Preuss

& British Isles
Name	Notes
(England) Frances Stephens	playing captain
(England) Angela Bonallack	played in 1956, 1958 and 1960
(England) Sally Bonallack
(England) Diane Robb Frearson
(England) Ann Irvin
(England) Ruth Porter	played in 1960
(England) Jean Roberts
(England) Marley Spearman	played in 1960
(England) Sheila Vaughan

== Friday's foursomes matches ==
&	Results
A. Bonallack/Spearman	(United States) 7 & 5	Decker/McIntyre
Irvin/Vaughan	(United States) 4 & 3	Creed/Gunderson
Frearson/Porter	(United States) 8 & 7	Ashley/Johnstone
0	Session	3
0	Overall	3

18-hole scores: Decker/McIntyre 6 up, Creed/Gunderson 1 up, Ashley/Johnstone 4 up

== Saturday's singles matches ==
Jean Roberts was a late replacement for Ann Irvin who was due to play in the fourth singles match.

&	Results
Marley Spearman	(United States) 5 & 4	Anne Decker
Angela Bonallack	(United States) 2 & 1	JoAnne Gunderson
Diane Robb Frearson	(United Kingdom) (Republic of Ireland) 8 & 7	Judy Bell
Jean Roberts	(United States) 1 up	Phyllis Preuss
Sally Bonallack	(United States) 6 & 5	Clifford Ann Creed
Sheila Vaughan	(United States) 5 & 4	Barbara McIntire
1	Session	5
1	Overall	8

18-hole scores: Decker 3 up, Gunderson 5 up, Frearson 7 up, Preuss 5 up, Creed 6 up, McIntire 5 up
