= 1954 Curtis Cup =

Golf competition in Ardmore, Pennsylvania

Coordinates: 40.001°N 75.312°W

8th Curtis Cup Match
- Dates: September 2–3, 1954
- Venue: Merion Golf Club
- Location: Ardmore, Pennsylvania
- Captains: Edith Flippin (USA); Dorothy Beck (British Isles)
| (United States) | 6 | 3 | (United Kingdom) (Republic of Ireland) |
- United States wins the Curtis Cup

The 8th Curtis Cup Match was played on September 2 and 3, 1954 at the Merion Golf Club in Ardmore, Pennsylvania. The United States won by 6 matches to 3.

The United States won all three foursomes matches and won three of the six singles matches.

== Format ==
The contest was played over two days, with three foursomes on the first day and six singles matches on the second day, a total of 9 points. Matches were over 36 holes.

Each of the 9 matches was worth one point in the larger team competition. If a match was all square after the 18th hole extra holes were not played. Rather, each side earned 1/2 a point toward their team total. The team that accumulated at least 5 points won the competition.

== Teams ==
United States
| Name | Notes |
| Edith Flippin | non-playing captain |
| Claire Doran | played in 1952 |
| Mary Lena Faulk |
| Patricia Lesser |
| Dorothy Kirby | played in 1948, 1950 and 1952 |
| Polly Riley | played in 1948, 1950 and 1952 |
| Barbara Romack |
| Grace DeMoss Smith | played in 1952 |
| Joyce Ziske |

& British Isles
| Name | Notes |
| (England) Dorothy Beck | playing captain |
| (England) Jeanne Bisgood | played in 1950 and 1952 |
| (Republic of Ireland) Philomena Garvey | played in 1948, 1950 and 1952 |
| (Scotland) Marjorie Peel |
| (England) Elizabeth Price | played in 1950 and 1952 |
| (Scotland) Janette Robertson |
| (England) Frances Stephens | played in 1950 and 1952 |
| (Scotland) Jessie Valentine | played in 1936, 1938, 1950 and 1952 |

Dorothy Beck did not select herself for any matches.

== Thursday's foursomes matches ==
| & | Results |
|---|---|---|
| Stephens/Price | (United States) 6 & 4 | Faulk/Riley |
| Valentine/Garvey | (United States) 6 & 5 | Doran/Lesser |
| Peel/Robertson | (United States) 6 & 5 | Kirby/Romack |
| 0 | Session | 3 |
| 0 | Overall | 3 |

18-hole scores: Faulk/Riley 3 up, Doran/Lesser 7 up, Kirby/Romack 3 up

== Friday's singles matches ==
| & | Results |
|---|---|---|
| Frances Stephens | (United Kingdom) (Republic of Ireland) 1 up | Mary Lena Faulk |
| Jeanne Bisgood | (United States) 4 & 3 | Claire Doran |
| Elizabeth Price | (United States) 9 & 8 | Polly Riley |
| Philomena Garvey | (United Kingdom) (Republic of Ireland) 3 & 1 | Dorothy Kirby |
| Jessie Valentine | (United States) 4 & 3 | Grace DeMoss Smith |
| Janette Robertson | (United Kingdom) (Republic of Ireland) 3 & 1 | Joyce Jiske |
| 3 | Session | 3 |
| 3 | Overall | 6 |

18-hole scores: Stephens 1 up, Bisgood 1 up, Riley 8 up, Garvey/Kirby all square, Smith 2 up, Ziske 1 up
