= 2008 Curtis Cup =

Team golf tournament

Coordinates: 56.343°N 2.805°W

35th Curtis Cup Match
- Dates: 30 May–1 June 2008
- Venue: The Old Course
- Location: St Andrews, Scotland
- Captains: Mary McKenna (GB&I); Carol Semple Thompson (USA)
(United Kingdom) (Republic of Ireland)	7	13	(United States)
- United States wins the Curtis Cup

The 35th Curtis Cup Match was played from 30 May to 1 June 2008 on the Old Course at St Andrews, Scotland. The United States won 13 to 7. This was the first Curtis Cup played over three days, including fourball matches for the first time. Stacy Lewis won all her five matches.

== Format ==
The contest was a three-day competition, with three foursomes and three fourball matches on each of the first two days, and eight singles matches on the final day, a total of 20 points.

Each of the 20 matches is worth one point in the larger team competition. If a match is all square after the 18th hole extra holes are not played. Rather, each side earns 1/2 a point toward their team total. The team that accumulates at least 10 1/2 points wins the competition. In the event of a tie, the current holder retains the Cup.

== Teams ==
Eight players for the Great Britain & Ireland and USA participated in the event plus one non-playing captain for each team.

The Great Britain & Ireland team was selected by the LGU in March 2008.

& Great Britain & Ireland
Name	Age	Notes
(Republic of Ireland) Mary McKenna	59	non-playing captain
(England) Liz Bennett	25
(Scotland) Carly Booth	15
(Scotland) Krystle Caithness	19
(England) Jodi Ewart	20
(Wales) Breanne Loucks	20	played in 2006
(England) Florentyna Parker	18
(Scotland) Michele Thomson	20
(Scotland) Sally Watson	16

The American team was selected by the USGA's International Team Selection Committee in January 2008.

Team USA
Name	Age	Notes
Carol Semple Thompson	59	non-playing captain
Amanda Blumenherst	21	played in 2006
Meghan Bolger	30
Mina Harigae	18
Tiffany Joh	21
Kimberly Kim	16
Jennie Lee	21	played in 2006
Stacy Lewis	23
Alison Walshe	23

== Friday's matches ==
=== Morning foursomes ===
&	Results
Bennett/Ewart	(United States) 3 & 1	Lewis/Walshe
Thomson/Watson	(United Kingdom) (Republic of Ireland) 1 up	Harigae/Lee
Loucks/Parker	(United States) 1 up	Blumenherst/Joh
1	Session	2
1	Overall	2

=== Afternoon fourballs ===
&	Results
Booth/Thomson	(United States) 3 & 2	Kim/Harigae
Watson/Caithness	(United Kingdom) (Republic of Ireland) 3 & 2	Joh/Bolger
Parker/Bennett	(United States) 3 & 1	Blumenherst/Lewis
1	Session	2
2	Overall	4

== Saturday's matches ==
=== Morning foursomes ===
&	Results
Booth/Loucks	(United Kingdom) (Republic of Ireland) 3 & 2	Kim/Lee
Watson/Thomson	(United States) 5 & 4	Walshe/Lewis
Bennett/Ewart	halved	Blumenherst/Joh
1 1/2	Session	1 1/2
3 1/2	Overall	5 1/2

=== Afternoon fourballs ===
&	Results
Booth/Loucks	(United States) 2 & 1	Kim/Harigae
Watson/Caithness	(United Kingdom) (Republic of Ireland) 3 & 2	Blumenherst/Bolger
Bennett/Parker	(United States) 1 up	Walshe/Lewis
1	Session	2
4 1/2	Overall	7 1/2

== Sunday's singles matches ==
&	Results
Breanne Loucks	(United States) 3 & 1	Kimberly Kim
Jodi Ewart	(United States) 2 & 1	Amanda Blumenherst
Elizabeth Bennett	(United States) 3 & 2	Stacy Lewis
Carly Booth	(United States) 6 & 5	Tiffany Joh
Michele Thomson	halved	Jennie Lee
Florentyna Parker	(United Kingdom) (Republic of Ireland) 6 & 4	Meghan Bolger
Krystle Caithness	(United Kingdom) (Republic of Ireland) 2 & 1	Mina Harigae
Sally Watson	(United States) 1 up	Alison Walshe
2 1/2	Session	5 1/2
7	Overall	13
