= Anna Davis =

American amateur golfer (born 2006)

Personal information
- Nationality: United States
- Born: March 17, 2006 (age 20)

Career
- Sport: Golf
- Status: Amateur

Best results in LPGA major championships
- Chevron Championship: DNP
- Women's PGA C'ship: DNP
- U.S. Women's Open: CUT: 2022, 2023
- Women's British Open: CUT: 2022
- Evian Championship: T65: 2022

Anna Davis (born March 17, 2006) is an American amateur golfer. In April 2022, Davis won the third Augusta National Women's Amateur at the age of 16. Davis shot a final round 69 (−3) to finish one under par, defeating Ingrid Lindblad and Latanna Stone, who tied for second.

Davis is the second teenage winner of the ANWA, following Tsubasa Kajitani in 2021. Davis, who is left-handed, won the Girls Junior PGA Championship in July 2021, and was a member of the 2021 U.S. Junior Solheim Cup team.

== Amateur wins ==
- 2021 PING Heather Farr Classic, Girl's Junior PGA Championship
- 2022 Augusta National Women's Amateur
- 2023 Junior Orange Bowl International, Junior Invitational at Sage Valley
- 2024 NCAA DI Auburn Regional, Illini Invitational at Medinah
- 2025 Charles Schwab Women's Collegiate, Ruth's Chris Tar Heel Invitational, Nanea Invitational
- 2026 NCAA Louisville Regional

== U.S. national team appearances ==
Amateur

- Junior Solheim Cup: 2021, 2023
- Junior Ryder Cup: 2023
- Arnold Palmer Cup: 2024 (winners), 2025, 2026
- Curtis Cup: 2024, 2026 (winners)
