= 2004 Curtis Cup =

Golf competition in Formby, Merseyside, England

Coordinates: 53.563°N 3.081°W

33rd Curtis Cup Match
- Dates: 12–13 June 2004
- Venue: Formby Golf Club
- Location: Formby, Merseyside, England
- Captains: Ada O'Sullivan (GB&I); Martha Kirouac (USA)
(United Kingdom) (Republic of Ireland)	8	10	(United States)
- United States wins the Curtis Cup

The 33rd Curtis Cup Match was played on 12 and 13 June 2004 at Formby Golf Club in Formby, Merseyside, England. The United States won 10 to 8. Great Britain and Ireland won 5 of the 6 foursomes but American dominated in the singles, winning 9 of the 12 matches. Michelle Wie became the youngest ever Curtis Cup player, at the age of 14.

== Format ==
The contest was a two-day competition, with three foursomes and six singles matches on each day, a total of 18 points.

Each of the 18 matches was worth one point in the larger team competition. If a match was all square after the 18th hole extra holes were not played. Rather, each side earned 1/2 a point toward their team total. The team that accumulated at least 9 1/2 points won the competition. In the event of a tie, the current holder retained the Cup.

== Teams ==
Eight players for Great Britain & Ireland and USA participated in the event plus one non-playing captain for each team.

& Great Britain & Ireland
Name	Age	Notes
(Republic of Ireland) Ada O'Sullivan	40	non-playing captain
(Republic of Ireland) Claire Coughlan	24
(England) Emma Duggleby	32	played in 2000 and 2002
(Wales) Anna Highgate	22
(Scotland) Anne Laing	29
(England) Danielle Masters	21
(England) Shelley McKevitt	24
(England) Fame More	23	played in 2002
(England) Nicola Timmins	24

Team USA
Name	Age	Notes
Martha Kirouac	55	non-playing captain
Erica Blasberg	19
Paula Creamer	17
Sarah Huarte	22
Liz Janangelo	20
Brittany Lang	18
Jane Park	17
Annie Thurman	21
Michelle Wie	14

== Saturday's matches ==
=== Morning foursomes ===
&	Results
McKevitt/Duggleby	(United Kingdom) (Republic of Ireland) 3 & 2	Park/Creamer
Timmins/Masters	(United Kingdom) (Republic of Ireland) 1 up	Huarte/Thurman
Laing/Coughlan	(United Kingdom) (Republic of Ireland) 1 up	Lang/Wie
3	Session	0
3	Overall	0

=== Afternoon singles ===
&	Results
Emma Duggleby	(United Kingdom) (Republic of Ireland) 3 & 2	Liz Janangelo
Danielle Masters	(United States) 1 up	Erica Blasberg
Fame More	(United States) 5 & 3	Paula Creamer
Anna Highgate	(United States) 5 & 4	Michelle Wie
Shelley McKevitt	(United States) 4 & 3	Jane Park
Anne Laing	(United States) 4 & 3	Annie Thurman
1	Session	5
4	Overall	5

== Sunday's matches ==
=== Morning foursomes ===
&	Results
Duggleby/McKevitt	(United Kingdom) (Republic of Ireland) 2 & 1	Blasberg/Huarte
Laing/Coughlan	(United Kingdom) (Republic of Ireland) 3 & 2	Janangelo/Wie
Timmins/Masters	(United States) 5 & 4	Lang/Thurman
2	Session	1
6	Overall	6

=== Afternoon singles ===
&	Results
Emma Duggleby	(United States) 3 & 2	Paula Creamer
Anne Laing	(United Kingdom) (Republic of Ireland) 3 & 1	Jane Park
Shelley McKevitt	(United States) 1 up	Liz Janangelo
Nicola Timmins	(United States) 6 & 5	Michelle Wie
Claire Coughlan	(United Kingdom) (Republic of Ireland) 2 up	Brittany Lang
Danielle Masters	(United States) 1 up	Annie Thurman
2	Session	4
8	Overall	10
