= Bel-Air Country Club =

County club located in Los Angeles, California, United States

- Interactive map of Bel-Air Country Club
- 34.079294°N 118.450218°W

Club information
- Location: Bel Air, Los Angeles, California, U.S.
- Established: 1926
- Type: Private
- Tota holes: 18
- Designed by: William P. Bell & George C. Thomas, Jr. (1925) Tom Doak (2018 renovation)
- Par: 70
- Length: 6,505

The Bel-Air Country Club is a social club located in Bel Air, Los Angeles, California. The property includes an 18-hole golf course and tennis courts.

The golf course is the home course for the UCLA Bruins men's and women's golf teams.

The course hosted the 2026 Curtis Cup.

== Bibliography ==
- Joe Novak, Bel-Air Country Club: A Living Legend (Delmar Printing, 1993)
