= Edean =

Edean may refer to:

- Edean Anderson Ihlanfeldt (born 1930), American amateur female golfer
- Roman Catholic Diocese of Edéa (Latin: Edean), Cameroon
- Another name for Kashyyyk, a fictional planet in the Star Wars universe

== See also ==
- Edea (disambiguation)
