= Ellen Port =

American amateur golfer (born 1961)

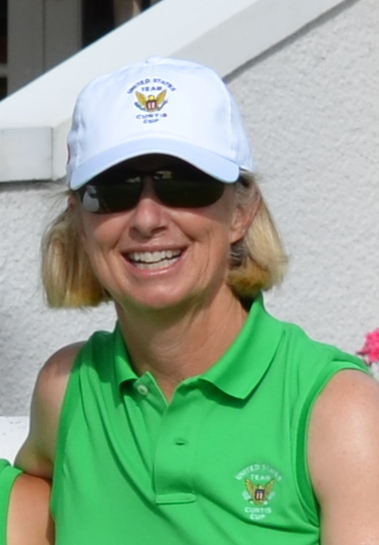
- Port in 2014

Personal information
- Nationality: United States
- Born: September 21, 1961 (age 65) North Kansas City, Missouri, U.S.
- Children: 2

Career
- Sport: Golf
- Status: Amateur

Best results in LPGA major championships
- U.S. Women's Open: CUT: 1993, 1994, 1996

Achievements and awards
- Missouri Sports Hall of Fame: 2012
- Bob Jones Award: 2026

Ellen Fuson Port (born September 21, 1961) is an amateur golfer and former golf coach. At United States Golf Association events between 1995 and 2016, Port won the U.S. Women's Mid-Amateur four times and the U.S. Senior Women's Amateur three times. She surpassed Carol Semple Thompson with her fourth Mid-Amateur win in 2011. Port and Meghan Bolger Stasi have the most wins at this event since 2012. With her seven titles, Port is tied for fifth for most career wins in USGA events. As a Curtis Cup golfer, her American team won in 1994 and lost in 1996.

As a coach at John Burroughs School, Port began to teach field hockey and golf in the early 1990s. With the golf teams at John Burroughs, Port was the coach of two teams that won championships held by the Missouri State High School Activities Association. After leaving John Burroughs in 2015, Port continued to teach golf with the women's team at Washington University in St. Louis until 2018. With Washington, her team was tied for tenth at the 2018 NCAA Division III Women's Golf Championships. Port was inducted into the Missouri Sports Hall of Fame in 2012 and received the Bob Jones Award during 2026.

== Early life and education ==
Port was born in North Kansas City, Missouri on September 21, 1961. During her childhood, Port participated in basketball, swimming and tennis. While attending North Kansas City High School, Port was the 1979 girls recipient for best competitor in sports for the high school. For her post-secondary education, Port chose tennis over basketball while attending the University of Missouri. In 1983, Port received a Bachelor of Education from Missouri. After her studies, Port left North Kansas City to live in St. Louis.

== Career ==
=== Amateur events ===
Port began playing golf in 1986 when she started working for John Burroughs School. As a member of the Missouri Golf Association, Port won the Amateur Championship nine times between 1992 and 2014. During this time period, Port won the event back to back from 2000 to 2003. She also was second at the Amateur Championship five times from 1996 to 2013. At the Senior Amateur Championship, Port won the event in 2020 and 2021.

For Metropolitan Amateur Golf Association events, Port won the Women's Amateur Championship sixteen times from 1993 to 2018. During this championship, Port was the back-to-back winner from 2000 to 2006. Her win at the 2021 Metropolitan Senior Amateur made Port the first female golfer to ever win the championship event for male golfers.

Port reached the quarterfinals during the 1992, 1993 and 2001 editions of the Women's Western Amateur. Port won the Women's Trans National in 1994. As the Ladies National Golf Association, Port won their Senior Amateur during 2024. She was a semifinalist at the 2000 North and South Women's Amateur.

At the 1992 U.S. Women's Amateur, Port reached the quarterfinals. The following year, she was tied for ninth at the Canadian Women's Amateur. At the age of 56, Port was the oldest ever U.S. Women's Amateur golfer in the match play round during the 2018 event.

Port won the U.S. Women's Mid-Amateur in 1995, 1996, 2000 and 2011. She was the runner-up at this event in 2002. With her 2011 win, she passed Carol Semple Thompson for most wins at the Women's Mid-Amateur. She shares the Mid-Amateur lead with Meghan Bolger Stasi since 2012. Competing at the U.S. Senior Women's Amateur, Port won the 2012, 2013 and 2016 editions while also finishing in second in 2021. With seven first places at United States Golf Association events, Port is second for most wins won by a female golfer and tied for fifth for most wins by any player.

In team events, Port was on the American Curtis Cup team that won in 1994 and lost in 1996. Port was also captain of the American team that won the Curtis Cup in 2014. At the 2021 U.S. Women's Amateur Four-Ball, Port and Lara Tennant did not qualify for the playoff round. They were cut during the 2026 edition.

=== Open and senior events ===
Port received an alternate spot at the 1992 U.S. Women's Open before she withdrew from the event. As a first-time U.S. Women's Open player, Port missed the cut during the 1993 U.S. Women's Open. Port also missed the cut at the 1994 U.S. Women's Open and 1996 U.S. Women's Open.

Competing at the U.S. Senior Women's Open, her highest finish in the event was 20th place during 2021. At that year's Senior Women's Open, Port held the amateur records for the least score during an individual round of golf and after 72 holes. Port and her Missourian teammates were tied for 11th at the 2007 USGA Women's State Team Championship. At North & South events, she won the Senior division in 2019 and the Super Senior in 2020. Port was second at the 2024 Canadian Women's Senior Championship.

=== Coaching career ===
While at John Burroughs, Port taught physical education and was a coach for multiple sport teams at the school. For individual sports, Port was a field hockey coach in early 1990s. During the late 1990s, Port continued to teach field hockey while also teaching golf. For her golf experience, Port became a golf coach in 1993 for boys before expanding in 2011 to girls. At championships held by the Missouri State High School Activities Association, Port won the Class 1A-2A event with the boys team in 1996. With the girls team, Port won the 2013 Class 1 event.

In 2015, Port left John Burroughs to coach the women's golf team at the Washington University in St. Louis. At the 2018 NCAA Division III Women's Golf Championships, her team finished in a tie for tenth place with DePauw University. That year, Port left the Washington golf team.

== Honors and personal life ==
Port received the Bernice Edlund Award from the Missouri Golf Association in 2011. Port won their Senior Women's Player of the Year and Women’s Player of the Year during 2023. She was inducted into the St Louis Sports Hall of Fame and Missouri Sports Hall of Fame in 2012. With Washington, Port was named the best Division III coach of the Central Region for the 2016–17 season by the Women's Golf Coaches Association.

She was additionally inducted into a hall of fame by Missouri Golf Association in 2017. Port was named Women's Player of the Year multiple times by the Metropolitan Amateur Golf Association, with her latest being given in 2021. She received the Bob Jones Award in 2026. Port is married and has two children.
