= Timeline of golf history (1945–1999) =

The following is a partial timeline of the history of golf.

== 1945–1949 ==
1945

- Byron Nelson wins 18 tournaments in a calendar year to set an all-time PGA Tour record-including a record 11 in a row and a record 19 consecutive rounds under 70. His total prize earnings during his 11-win streak, $30,000, is less than last place money for the PGA Tour Championship by 1992.
- The Tam O'Shanter Open offers a then-record purse of $60,000.

1946

- Sam Snead travels to St Andrews to compete in the first post-war Open Championship, and is victorious, winning by four shots from Johnny Bulla and Bobby Locke.
- Lloyd Mangrum wins the U.S. Open in a second playoff, after three players - Mangrum, Byron Nelson and Vic Ghezzi - all tie with 72 in the first playoff.
- The U.S. Women's Open is instituted. Patty Berg is the first winner.

1947

- Mildred "Babe" Zaharias becomes the first American to win the British Ladies Amateur, at Gullane.
- Golf is televised for the first time, in a local St. Louis telecast of the U.S. Open.
- Lew Worsham wins a playoff for the U.S. Open against Sam Snead. The playoff ends in controversy as Worsham asks officials to measure which ball is closest to the hole, just as Snead is about to putt. The measure proves Snead is to putt first, but he misses, and Worsham holes his putt for victory.
- Amateur Frank Stranahan finishes runner-up at both the U.S. Masters (two shots behind Jimmy Demaret), and the British Open (a shot behind Fred Daly). Leading amateur players would continue to make occasional forays onto the leaderboards of major championships (excepting the PGA, for obvious reasons) until the early 1960s, since when it has become extremely rare for an amateur to finish in the top-ten.
- Jim Ferrier becomes the first Australian to win a major championship, when he defeats Chick Harbert 2 and 1 in the final of the PGA Championship.
- Golf World magazine is founded.

1948

- Henry Cotton wins his third British Open, at the age of 41.
- Ben Hogan wins eleven tournaments during the season, including both the U.S. Open and PGA Championships.
- Club professional Claude Harmon - invited after finishing twentieth in the previous year's U.S. Open - wins the Masters championship.
- Bobby Locke sets a PGA Tour record with a 16-stroke winning margin in the Chicago Victory National Championship.
- Herbert Warren Wind's authoritative The Story of American Golf is published.
- The U.S. Junior Amateur is instituted. Ken Venturi loses to Dean Lind in the first final.
- The USGA Golf Journal is founded.

1949

- In February, Ben Hogan is involved in a terrible car accident that nearly kills him, and leaves him unable to walk, let alone play golf, for the whole season. In his absence, Sam Snead enjoys his finest season, winning the Masters, the PGA Championship and finishing second at the U.S. Open to Cary Middlecoff.
- Bobby Locke becomes the first South African to win the Open Championship .
- Louise Suggs wins the U.S. Women's Open by a record margin of 14 strokes.
- Marie Roke of Wollaston, Massachusetts aces a 393-yard (359 m) hole—the longest ace ever recorded by a woman.
- The U.S. side defeat Great Britain and Ireland 7–5 to win the Ryder Cup at Ganton, in Yorkshire. The following week, the team stay in England to accept invites to the News of the World Match Play; here, however, they are unable to take the trophy, for although Lloyd Mangrum reaches the semi-final, the eventual winner is Welshman Dai Rees.

== 1950s ==
1950

- The LPGA is founded, replacing the ailing Women's Professional Golf Association.
- Ben Hogan, only weeks after returning to the PGA Tour following a near-fatal auto accident, wins the U.S. Open at Merion.

1951

- Francis Ouimet becomes the first American Captain of The Royal and Ancient Golf Club of St Andrews.
- The USGA and the R & A, in a conference, complete a newly revised Rules of Golf. Although in 1951 the R & A and the USGA continue to differ over the size of the golf ball, all other conflicts are resolved in this momentous conference. The center-shafted putter is legalized worldwide. The out-of-bounds penalty is standardized at stroke-and-distance, and the stymie is finally and forever abolished.
- Golf Digest is founded, with Bill Davis as editor.
- On February 10, Al Brosch became the first PGA player to shoot a round of 11 under par. Brosch set the record in the third round of the Texas Open at Brackenridge Park Golf Course in San Antonio, Texas.
- Despite competing in only 5 events in a playing schedule severely curtailed following his car crash, Ben Hogan finishes fourth on the U.S. Tour money list. From his five starts, Hogan wins the Masters, the U.S. Open and the World Championship of Golf. He finishes 2nd and 4th in his other two events - the Seminole Pro-Am and the Colonial Invitational.

1952

- Marlene Hagge wins the Sarasota Open when she is 18 years 14 days old—an LPGA record.
- Patty Berg shoots an LPGA-record of 64 for an 18-hole round.
- The National Hole-in-One Clearing House is established by Golf Digest.

1953

- Tommy Armour's How to Play Your Best Golf All the Time is published and becomes the first golf book ever to hit the best-seller lists.
- Ben Hogan wins the first three legs of the modern Grand Slam (The Masters, U.S. Open, and British Open), but does not compete in the final leg, the PGA Championship.
- The Tam O'Shanter World Championship becomes the first tournament to be nationally televised. Lew Worsham holes a 104-yard (95 m) wedge shot on the final hole for eagle and victory in one of the most dramatic finishes ever.
- The Canada Cup is instituted, the first event that brings together teams from all over the world. After 1966 the tournament is known as the World Cup. The inaugural tournament is won by Argentina, whose two-man team of Roberto De Vicenzo and Antonio Cerdá beats a 9-team field that includes a United States team of Julius Boros and Jim Turnesa. Within a couple of years, more than 30 nations are represented at the event, which becomes one of the most important fixtures on golf's calendar.

1954

- Sam Snead defeats Ben Hogan 70–71 in a playoff for the U.S. Masters
- Peter Thomson wins the British Open, the first of five victories he will achieve in the event.
- Architect Robert Trent Jones, upon receiving complaints that he has made the par-3 fourth hole at Baltusrol too hard for the upcoming U.S. Open, plays the hole to see for himself and records a hole-in-one.
- The U.S. Open is nationally televised for the first time.
- The Tam O'Shanter World Championship offers the first $100,000 purse for a golf tournament. Bob Toski wins the $50,000 first prize. Toski's three other tournament victories on the PGA Tour this year earn him a total of $8,000.
- All-Star Golf, a filmed series of matches, debuts on network television.
- Babe Zaharias returns to the LPGA Tour following cancer surgery and wins the U.S. Women's Open.
- The first PGA Merchandise Show is held in a parking lot in Dunedin, Florida, outside the PGA National Golf Club. Salesmen work the show out of the trunks of their cars. The Show goes on to become one of the main events on the golfing calendar—by 1994 it grows to over 30,000 attendees, four days, and has become the single largest tenant of the Orange County Convention Center in Orlando, spilling over 220,000 square feet (20,000 square metres) of exhibit space.

1955

- Ben Hogan, chasing a record fifth U.S. Open title, surprisingly loses a playoff to rookie Jack Fleck.
- On February 17, Mike Souchak began one of the most spectacular four-day performances in PGA history with a round of 60. In winning the Texas Open at the Brackenridge Park Golf Course in San Antonio, Texas, three days later Souchak set a 72-hole record by finishing 27 under par. His rounds of 60–68–64–65 resulted in a total of 257. Souchak's record withstood the challenges of nearly 2,000 PGA events before Mark Calcavecchia finally broke it in 2001.

1956

- Cary Middlecoff, winner of the Masters the previous year, wins the U.S. Open title, by a shot from Ben Hogan and Julius Boros. Peter Thomson, who would go on to win a third consecutive British Open championship, finishes fourth.
- Jack Burke Jr. wins both the Masters and the PGA Championship, his Masters victory coming after third-round leader, amateur Ken Venturi, stumbles with an 80 in the final round.
- The current yardage guides for par are adopted by the USGA.

1957

- The Great Britain and Ireland team wins the Ryder Cup Matches at Lindrick, ending a drought that dates back to 1935.
- Harvie Ward loses his amateur status for accepting expenses from sponsors for golf tournaments. The ruling is reversed in 1958.
- Ben Hogan's Five Lessons is published.

1958

- Arnold Palmer is allowed a controversial free drop to save par in the final round of The Masters, and he goes on to defeat Ken Venturi.

1959

- Art Wall Jr. enjoys his finest season, winning the Masters and topping the U.S. Tour Money list following three further victories. The year also marks the arrival as major champions of Gary Player, winner of the British Open, and Billy Casper, winner of the U.S. Open.
- Bill Wright, in winning the U.S. Amateur Public Links, becomes the first African-American to win a national championship.
- Golf Magazine is founded, with Charles Price as the first editor.

== 1960s ==
1960

- Arnold Palmer comes back from six shots down in the final round to win the U.S. Open, with 20-year-old Amateur Jack Nicklaus finishing runner-up. With his victory, Palmer completes the first two legs of the modern Grand Slam after winning The Masters in April, the first player to win both since Ben Hogan in 1953. He goes on to finish second to Australian Kel Nagle in the British Open to end his bid for the Grand Slam. Palmer's entry in the British Open is credited with reviving American interest in the championship, which had rarely attracted America's leading players since World War Two. Palmer went on to win the British Open in both 1961 and 1962.
- Lifting, cleaning, and repairing ball marks is allowed on the putting green for the first time.

1961

- Gary Player becomes the first foreign player to win The Masters.
- Caucasians-only clause stricken from the PGA constitution, and at the Greater Greensboro Open, Charlie Sifford becomes the first black golfer to play in a PGA co-sponsored tournament in the South.

1962

- Dr. Joseph Boydstone records 11 aces in one calendar year. Three were recorded in one round, at Bakersfield C.C., Calif.
- Jack Nicklaus wins his first professional tournament, the U.S. Open, making him (among his many other notable records) one of very few players to win the U.S. Open as their first pro victory (Orville Moody and Jerry Pate would later emulate the feat).
- Painted lines are first utilized to mark water hazards at the U.S. Open.

1963

- Arnold Palmer becomes the first professional to earn over $100,000 in official prize money in one calendar year.
- Mickey Wright wins a record 13 events on the LPGA Tour in one year.
- Bob Charles becomes the first New Zealander to win a major championship, winning the British Open after a playoff with American Phil Rodgers.
- The casting method for irons is first employed.

1964

- PGA National opens, in Palm Beach, Florida.
- Mickey Wright sets the LPGA 18-hole record with a 62 at Hogan Park GC in the Tall City Open.
- Norman Manley, an amateur from Long Beach, California, scores holes-in-one on two successive par-4s at Del Valley CC, Calif. It is the first and only time this feat has been accomplished.
- Tony Lema, the colorful U.S. professional, wins the British Open at St Andrews. It would be Lema's greatest triumph before he was killed in an air crash in 1966, aged just 32.
- Mark McCormack establishes the Piccadilly World Match Play Championship at Wentworth, which brings together the year's four major winners, and other invited leading players of the year from the British and American tours. The inaugural event is won by Arnold Palmer, who defeats Britain's Neil Coles in the final. Gary Player would come to dominate the event for the following decade with five wins, twice defeating Jack Nicklaus in the final.

1965

- Sam Snead wins the Greater Greensboro Open, his 81st Tour victory, a record (the total was later revised to 82). His victory is the eighth in the Greensboro event, also a record. Finally, he wins at the age of 52, also a PGA Tour record.
- Jack Nicklaus sets a tournament record of 271 in winning The Masters.
- Gary Player wins the U.S. Open championship after a playoff with Australian Kel Nagle, to complete a career "Grand Slam" of the four major professional titles. He becomes only the third player (Gene Sarazen and Ben Hogan were the first two) to accomplish the feat.
- Peter Thomson wins a fifth Open Championship, and in so doing proves that he can beat a field that includes the leading U.S. Tour professionals of the day, many of whom had ignored the event for his wins in the 1950s. On the final day, Thomson overtook Tony Lema, Bruce Devlin and Arnold Palmer to win.
- Dave Marr wins the PGA Championship, by two shots from Jack Nicklaus and Billy Casper. Although Marr would never win another major title as a player, he would go on to become one of the most popular and well-respected TV commentators on the game.
- Mrs. William Jenkins Sr. of Baltimore, Maryland, double-eagles the par-five 12th hole at Longview GC, the longest ever recorded by a woman.
- On October 7, 1965, a 50 mph (80 km/h) wind gust helped golfer Robert Mitera sink history's longest hole-in-one, a 447-yard (409 m) ace of the 10th hole at Omaha's Miracle Hill Golf Club.
- PGA Tour Qualifying School is inaugurated at PGA National, with 17 golfers of the 49 applicants winning their playing cards.

1966

- Arnold Palmer blows a six-shot lead in the final round of the U.S. Open, dropping back into a playoff, which he loses, to a surging Billy Casper at Olympic. Although he remained one of the world's leading players for another decade, and one of its most influential and charismatic figures for the rest of his career, Palmer would never win another major championship.
- Jack Nicklaus wins his first British Open championship, to become the fourth player to complete a career "Grand Slam", just a year after Gary Player became the third. It would be another 34 years before a fifth player (Tiger Woods) accomplished the feat.

1967

- After six finishes in the top three without a victory, Argentine Roberto De Vicenzo wins a popular British Open victory at Hoylake, by two shots from Jack Nicklaus and by six from Gary Player and local favourite Clive Clark.
- A year after losing the same event in a playoff to Jack Nicklaus, Gay Brewer wins the Masters.
- Charlie Sifford, by winning the Greater Hartford Open, becomes the first African-American to win a PGA Tour event.
- Catherine Lacoste becomes the first amateur to win the U.S. Women's Open.
- The Canada Cup changes its name to the World Cup.

1968

- Arnold Palmer passes the $1 million mark in career PGA earnings.
- The PGA of America and the PGA Tour officially split, with the tournament professionals forming a breakaway group known as the Association of Professional Golfers. The breach is eventually healed, and a Tournament Players Division of the PGA is formed. Joe Dey is elected the next year as the first PGA Tour commissioner.
- Roberto De Vicenzo "ties" Bob Goalby after regulation play in The Masters, but signs an incorrect scorecard (that showed him having scored a 4 on the 17th hole instead of the 3 he actually took) and so loses the event by that stroke without a playoff. The sad decision is announced to incredulous spectators only after officials and tournament advisors including Bobby Jones do everything they can to scour the rulebook for a possible loophole.
- Canada wins the World Cup of Golf—the event previously known as the Canada Cup, which they never won—in Italy. Their 2-man team of Al Balding and George Knudson beat U.S. team Lee Trevino and Julius Boros by two shots.
- Tommy Moore, age 6 years 1 month, 1 week, becomes the youngest player to score a hole-in-one. Moore also becomes, in 1975, the youngest player ever to score a double-eagle.

1969

- Ollie Bowers of Gaffney, South Carolina completes a record 542 rounds (9,756 holes) in one calendar year.
- Tony Jacklin becomes the first home player to win the British Open for 18 years, with a two-shot victory over Bob Charles at Royal Lytham.
- Jack Nicklaus concedes Tony Jacklin's final putt and Britain ties the U.S. in the Ryder Cup Matches, after five consecutive defeats. The gesture is often hailed as "the greatest act of sportsmanship in history."
- The trendsetting Harbour Town Golf Links opens on Hilton Head Island, South Carolina, designed by Pete Dye with assistance from Jack Nicklaus.

== 1970s ==
1970

- So often disappointed in final-round battles at Augusta, Billy Casper finally wins a Masters championship, after a playoff against fellow veteran Gene Littler.
- Tony Jacklin becomes the first British winner of the U.S. Open for almost 50 years, at Hazeltine. As of 2009, he is the last European to win this event.
- Jack Nicklaus wins a playoff against Doug Sanders to win the British Open at St Andrews. Sanders, three times before a runner-up in major championships, missed a short putt on the final hole of regulation play to secure the title.
- Bill Burke, with a 57 at Normandie C.C., sets the all-time official record for low 18-hole score.
- Thad Doker of Durham, N.C., records a record two-under par 70 in the World One Club Championship at Lochmere CC.

1971

- JoAnne Carner wins the U.S. Women's Open, becoming the first person to win three different individual USGA championship events. She had previously won the U.S. Girls' Junior once and the U.S. Women's Amateur five times.
- Laura Baugh wins the U.S. Women's Amateur at 16 years 2 months of age.
- Alan Shepard hits a six-iron at "Fra Mauro Country Club" on the moon.
- Lee Trevino enjoys an astonishing summer, winning the U.S. Open, the Canadian Open, and then the British Open Championship, in quick succession. He becomes the first player to win the U.S. and British Opens in the same year since Ben Hogan in 1953. His British Open victory comes after a final-round duel with immediate crowd favourite Lu Liang-Huan, from Taiwan - "Mr. Lu" - the first time any Asian golfer had finished in the top three of a major tournament.
- Jack Nicklaus wins the PGA Championship - unusually played in February in 1971 - but then surprisingly loses the Masters, beaten in the final round by unheralded playing partner Charles Coody. Nicklaus would then lose a playoff for the U.S. Open to Lee Trevino.
- The classic golf book Golf in the Kingdom by Michael Murphy, is published.

1972

- Carolyn Cudone wins the U.S. Senior Women's Amateur for a record fifth consecutive time.
- Dick Kimbrough completes 364 holes in 24 hours at the 6,068 North Platte CC in Nebraska.
- Tom Doty records 10-under-par in four holes at Brookwood CC, Illinois. His streak includes a double-eagle, two holes-in-one, and an eagle.
- Spalding introduces the first two-piece ball, the Top-Flite.
- Jack Nicklaus completes the first two legs of the modern Grand Slam winning the Masters and the U.S. Open (at Pebble Beach), but like Arnold Palmer in 1960, falters in the British Open by finishing second (to Lee Trevino). Nicklaus was also the holder of the 1971 PGA Championship, and so would have become the first golfer to hold all four titles at the same time, although not the first to win four consecutive professional majors. Trevino's one-shot victory at Muirfield comes after he holes seemingly impossible chip shots from off the green at both the 16th and 18th holes in the third round, and then again at the 17th in the final round - snatching the tournament from under the nose of playing partner and home favourite Tony Jacklin, who is so stunned he proceeds to three-putt the 17th from 15 feet (4.6 m) then bogey the last as well, to miss out on even second place. The young Jacklin would never again challenge seriously in a major championship.

1973

- Ben Crenshaw wins the NCAA title for a record 3rd consecutive time. Later in the year, after earning his PGA Tour card, he wins the first event he plays as a PGA Tour member, the San Antonio Texas Open.
- Johnny Miller fires a record 63 in the final round to win the U.S. Open at Oakmont.
- Tom Weiskopf enjoys his most successful season, with four U.S. tour victories capped by a victory in the British Open.
- Tommy Aaron, the player whose mistakenly recorded 4 on Roberto De Vicenzo's card in 1968 was not noticed in time to prevent disaster, wins the U.S. Masters. Britain's young player Peter Oosterhuis leads after 3 rounds but finishes third, the closest any British player had come to victory at Augusta at that time.
- The graphite shaft is invented. (The graphite shaft was introduced to the game in 1969, as invented by Frank Thomas in 1968.)
- Jack Nicklaus wins the PGA Championship and breaks Bobby Jones' record for most major victories with his 14th. Nicklaus wins seven times in total on the U.S. Tour, for the second year in succession, to top the annual U.S. Money List for a sixth time, taking him clear of the record number of five that he had shared with Ben Hogan.

1974

- Deane Beman is elected as the second PGA Tour commissioner.
- Gary Player, aged 39, enjoys arguably his most successful season, winning both the Masters Championship and the British Open. Meanwhile, on the U.S. tour, Johnny Miller wins eight times, the most by any player in a single season since Arnold Palmer in 1960.
- Roberto De Vicenzo scores six birdies, an eagle, and three more birdies for a record 11-under par for ten holes, at Valla Allende GC, Argentina.
- Jerry Pate wins the U.S. Amateur at Ridgewood C.C. in New Jersey, beating Curtis Strange in the semi-final. The pair would go on to win 3 U.S. Open titles between them in distinguished careers.
- The World Golf Hall of Fame is opened in Pinehurst, North Carolina.
- Mike Austin hits a 515-yard (471 m) drive at the 1974 National Seniors Open in Las Vegas, Nev., the longest drive ever recorded in competition.
- Jack Nicklaus' Golf My Way is published and rapidly becomes one of the best-selling sports books of all time.
- Tom Weiskopf strikes a 420-yard (380 m) drive in the greenside bunker on the 10th hole at Augusta National—the longest drive in Masters history.
- Muirfield Village Golf Club opens from a Desmond Muirhead/Jack Nicklaus design.
- The Tournament Players Championship is inaugurated.

1975

- Lee Elder becomes the first black golfer to play in The Masters. The event is won by Jack Nicklaus, a fifth Masters victory which takes Jack clear of Arnold Palmer's record of four.
- Both the U.S. Open and the British Open are characterized by well-known third-round leaders suffering poor final rounds to allow relatively unknown players to pass them and win. At Medinah, Frank Beard gives away a three-shot overnight lead, and Lou Graham emerges victorious; at Carnoustie, South Africa's Bobby Cole — winner of the individual and team titles at the previous year's World Cup — is the victim, allowing Tom Watson to slip past for his first major victory.
- Lee Trevino, Jerry Heard and Bobby Nichols are struck by lightning during the 1975 Western Open. The incident prompts new safety standards in weather preparedness at PGA Tour events, but one spectator is killed when struck by lightning during the 1991 U.S. Open at Hazeltine National, and one at the PGA Championship at Crooked Stick later that summer.

1976

- Nerveless rookie Jerry Pate wins the U.S. Open championship, firing a spectacular approach shot over a lake to within two feet at the final hole, after playing partner John Mahaffey had hit into the water attempting the same feat.
- Judy Rankin becomes the first LPGA professional to earn more than $100,000 in a season.
- Richard Stanwood sets the record for fewest putts in one round—15—at Riverside GC in Pocatello, Idaho.
- The USGA institutes the Overall Distance Standard—golf balls that fly more than 280 yards (260 m) during a standard test are banned.

1977

- Al Geiberger shoots 59 at Colonial CC in the second round of the Danny Thomas Memphis Classic, to set a new PGA Tour 18-hole record.
- Bing Crosby dies after completing a round of golf in Spain. His Bing Crosby National Pro-Am continues for several years, but after relations sour between the PGA Tour and the Crosby family, AT&T takes over sponsorship of the event.
- Police receive a telephoned threat against the life of U.S. Open leader Hubert Green as he prepares to complete his final round. Green is informed of the threat but chooses to complete the tournament, and goes on to win.
- The "sudden-death" playoff is used for the first time in a major championship, when Lanny Wadkins defeats Gene Littler for the PGA Championship played at Pebble Beach.
- In what has been described as the most exciting tournament in history, Tom Watson defeats Jack Nicklaus by one stroke in the British Open, at Turnberry. They were tied with each other after two rounds, and played together for the final 36 holes, during which they shot 65–65, and 65–66, respectively. Runner-up Nicklaus finished ten shots clear of third place.
- Chako Higuchi of Japan wins the LPGA Championship, making her the first Asian-born golfer to win a major championship.

1978

- The Legends of Golf is inaugurated at Onion Creek C.C. in Austin, Texas. Its popularity leads to the formation of the Senior PGA Tour two years later.
- Gary Player, aged 43, wins the Masters championship for his ninth major title. As if not to be upstaged, later in the year Jack Nicklaus wins a third British Open title, taking his career total to fifteen.
- John Mahaffey wins the PGA Championship in a playoff, after Tom Watson lets slip a five-shot lead during the final day. Watson, an eight-time major champion, would never win a PGA Championship to complete the career Grand Slam.
- The ever-growing LPGA Tour finds a new superstar to make headlines that surpass even those from the men's game, as Nancy Lopez, in her rookie season, wins five events in a row among nine victories in all.

1979

- The Ryder Cup is reformatted to add European continent players to the British and Irish side, making the event far more competitive. The move is prompted in no small part by the rise of golfers such as Seve Ballesteros. As if to emphasise the need for change, Ballesteros — already known simply as "Sevvy" to an adoring British public — wins the British Open at Lytham St Annes, becoming the first Spanish golfer to win a major, and the first from Continental Europe to win a major since Frenchman Arnaud Massy in 1907.
- The United States Golf Association opens the U.S. Amateur and U.S. Women's Amateur to golfers not affiliated with private clubs.
- Taylor Made introduces the first metal woods.
- The USGA forms the Handicap Research Team which results in the creation of what is now the Slope rating system.
- Ed Sneed bogeys each of the last three holes to lose a three-shot lead at the Masters, and drop back into a playoff which is then won by Fuzzy Zoeller.

== 1980s ==
1980

- Tom Watson is the first golfer to earn $500,000 in prize money in a single season.
- The Senior PGA Tour is born, with four official events. The U.S. Senior Open is instituted. Roberto De Vicenzo is the first winner.
- Jack Nicklaus sets a record of 272 in the U.S. Open at Baltusrol. His mark is equalled in the 1993 U.S. Open by Lee Janzen, also at Baltusrol, and later by Tiger Woods in 2000 at Pebble Beach and Jim Furyk in 2003 at Olympia Fields. Isao Aoki finishes second, the highest finish by a Japanese golfer at a major championship.
- The USGA introduces the Symmetry Standard, banning balls such as the Polaris which correct themselves in flight.
- Gary Wright completes 18 holes in a record 28 minutes 9 seconds at Twantin Noosa GC, Australia 6,039 yards (5,522 m).

1981

- The Tournament Players Club at Sawgrass opens, with its controversial island green 17th hole, and immediately becomes the permanent host of the Tournament Players Championship. The TPC at Sawgrass becomes the prototype for a dozen "stadium" TPC courses around the United States, built specifically to host PGA Tour co-sponsored events and affording better viewing for spectators.
- The USGA institutes the U.S. Mid-Amateur for male amateur golfers 25 and older.
- Kathy Whitworth becomes the first woman to earn $1 million in career prize money.
- Bill Rogers wins the British Open, the Australian Open, and has victories in America and Japan.
- Sol Kerzner, the owner of the Sun City resort complex in South Africa, creates golf's first $1m purse event - the Sun City Million Dollar Challenge. The inaugural event (and $500,000) is won by Johnny Miller.
- Nathaniel Crosby, son of late film star Bing, wins the U.S. Amateur championship.

1982

- Kevin Murray double-eagles the 647 yards (592 m) second hole at the Guam Navy GC, the longest double-eagle ever recorded.
- Tom Watson holes one of the most famous shots in U.S. Open history, a delicate chip from the rough beside the 17th green at Pebble Beach that helps him to defeat Jack Nicklaus. A month later, Watson wins his fourth British Open title, in a tournament that will be remembered for the collapse of young American Bobby Clampett. Virtually unknown (certainly to British fans) going into the event, Clampett began 67–66 to open up a 5-shot halfway lead. Still the leader after three rounds, he shot a sorry 77 in the final round to finish well down the field. Watson narrowly misses out on a fifth U.S. Money List crown in six years, as that honour goes to the fiery Craig Stadler, who wins the U.S. Masters in his finest season.

1983

- The PGA Tour introduces the 'all-exempt' Tour, with the top 125 players from the 1982 money list exempt from weekly qualifying for tournaments, as opposed to the top 60 as before. A record 34 different players win tournaments, and no-one is able to win more than twice. One who does win twice is 25-year-old Hal Sutton, 1982's rookie of the year, who becomes Player of the Year with victories in the Tournament Players Championship and PGA Championship. Isao Aoki becomes the first Japanese golfer to win on the U.S. Tour, with victory in the Hawaiian Open. Aoki holes a 128-yard (117 m) wedge shot on the final hole for an eagle that allows him to defeat Jack Renner by one stroke.
- Seve Ballesteros wins his second U.S. Masters, and is inspirational as a youthful European side come agonizingly close to defeating the United States in the Ryder Cup.
- Tom Watson wins a fifth British Open title - but his first in England not Scotland, after a scrambling final day that with nine holes to play saw seven players - Watson, Lee Trevino, Graham Marsh, Andy Bean, Hale Irwin, Raymond Floyd and home favourite Nick Faldo - all within a shot of the lead. Watson almost retains his U.S. Open crown as well, but loses by a shot to Larry Nelson, who holes a 60-foot (18 m) downhill putt on Oakmont's 16th green on his way to victory.

1984

- Desert Highlands opens in Phoenix from a design by Jack Nicklaus utilizing only 80 acres (320,000 m^{2}) irrigated for 18 holes, instead of the typical 100–150 for a major course. The success of Nicklaus' concept of "target golf" ushers in the era of environmentally sensitive desert design.
- Ben Crenshaw, after five second-place finishes in Major championships, finally wins one, as he beats his long-time friend Tom Kite to take his first U.S. Masters title.
- Seve Ballesteros defeats Tom Watson in one of the most dramatic finishes ever at the British Open at St Andrews. As Ballesteros birdied the final hole to a huge roar from his adopted "home" fans, Watson pushed his approach at the famous 17th "Road Hole" through the green and against a wall, dropping a crucial shot.
- At the age of 44, Lee Trevino wins a sixth major championship, the PGA Championship. It is ten years since his last one. 48-year-old Gary Player is runner-up.

1985

- Nancy Lopez sets the LPGA 72-hole record with 268 in the Henredon Classic.
- Bernhard Langer becomes the first German golfer to win a Major Championship, when he wins the U.S. Masters. Later in the summer, Sandy Lyle becomes the first British player to win the Open Championship for 16 years, despite a nervy finish at Sandwich. These successes are topped off in the Autumn when Europe regains the Ryder Cup for the first time since 1957, beating the United States at The Belfry in England.
- In one of the most unlikely U.S. Open championships in history, a Taiwanese, a South African and a Canadian are all narrowly beaten by an American — one who hadn't won a tournament for seven years. Former champion Andy North held off Chen Tze-chung, Denis Watson and Dave Barr for his second major victory. Later in the year, Hubert Green, like North without a victory for several years, also won his second major title, at the PGA Championship.
- Calvin Peete wins the Tournament Players Championship with a course record 72-hole score of 274. Although not a major championship, this is the most significant tour victory to this date by a black golfer.
- The $1m Alfred Dunhill Cup at St Andrews is inaugurated, a three-man matchplay competition that aims to replace the World Cup of Golf — a largely ignored event for several years now - as the premier international team event. Australia win the opening version, their team of Greg Norman, Graham Marsh and David Graham defeating a United States side of Mark O'Meara, Raymond Floyd and Curtis Strange 3–0 in the final.
- The USGA introduces the Slope System to allow golfers to adjust their handicaps to allow for the relative difficulty of a golf course compared to players of their own ability.

1986

- Jack Nicklaus, at the age of 46, shoots a final-round 65 at The Masters to win his 18th professional major championship, and 20th in all. His final-day charge takes him past virtually all of the leading players of the generation below him, including Greg Norman, Seve Ballesteros, Tom Watson and Tom Kite. In June, Raymond Floyd also rolls back the years to win the U.S. Open, aged 44.
- The Sony Rankings system, now the Official World Golf Rankings, is introduced, the first formally recognised ranking system for men's golf. The first-ever number one, in April 1986, is 1985 Masters Champion Bernhard Langer.
- Bob Tway sinks a bunker shot at the final hole to beat Greg Norman in the PGA Championship. Norman had held the lead on Sunday morning in each of the four major championships of 1986, but was able to win only the British Open. Tway's stroke began a celebrated series of miracle shots holed by various golfers to defeat Norman in major events.
- The Pete Dye-designed PGA West opens amid great controversy concerning the difficulty of the course.
- The Panasonic Las Vegas Invitational offers the first $1 million purse on the PGA Tour. The $207,000 first prize is won by Greg Norman, who finishes the year top of both the U.S. Money List and the World Rankings.
- The PGA Tour Team Charity Competition debuts. By 1987, Tour-related contributions to charity exceed $100,000,000, and by 1992 they reach a total of $200,000,000.

1987

- The Links at Spanish Bay opens, the first true links course in the Western United States. It is a co-design by Robert Trent Jones Jr., Tom Watson, and former USGA President Frank "Sandy" Tatum.
- Judy Bell becomes the first woman elected to the USGA Executive Committee.
- Larry Mize holed a 40-yard (37 m) pitch shot to defeat Greg Norman in a play-off for the U.S. Masters. The previous year, Norman had beaten Mize in a playoff for the Kemper Open after Mize hit a short pitch shot across a green and into a lake. Norman, a 10-time winner around the globe in 1986, would not win again on the U.S. Tour for over twelve months.
- At the British Open, Nick Faldo plays a flawless last round of 18 consecutive pars to win his first major championship. The victory rewarded Faldo's efforts to completely re-model his swing, that had seen him virtually leave the Tour for two years.
- Larry Nelson wins his third major championship in six years, defeating Lanny Wadkins in a playoff for the PGA Championship. The victory means that three of Nelson's nine career U.S.Tour wins to date have come in majors.
- Europe win the Ryder Cup on American soil for the first time, and rub salt into the wounds by defeating an American team captained by Jack Nicklaus, at the Muirfield Village course which Nicklaus designed. The result provides final confirmation of the recent swing in global dominance away from the American players; at the end of 1987, only one of the world's top six (Curtis Strange, in 5th) is American, while four (Seve Ballesteros, Bernhard Langer, Sandy Lyle and Ian Woosnam) are European, while the world number one remains Greg Norman.
- The Nabisco Championships (later The Tour Championship) debuts as a season-ending event for the top 30 money winners. The first winner is Tom Watson, breaking a three-year victory drought. Earlier in the year, Watson narrowly missed victory at the U.S. Open, finishing second to unheralded Scott Simpson.
- Walter Dietz, a blind golfer, aces the 155 yards (142 m) seventh hole at Manakiki G.C., California.

1988

- Links magazine is founded as Southern Links, with Mark Brown as editor-in-chief.
- Lori Garbacz orders a pizza between holes at the U.S. Women's Open to protest slow play.
- Square-grooved clubs such as the PING Eye2 irons are banned by the USGA, which claims that tests show the clubs give an unfair competitive advantage to PING customers. The PGA Tour also bans the clubs in 1989. Karsten Manufacturing, maker of the clubs, fights a costly two-year battle with both the USGA and the PGA Tour to have the ban rescinded after winning a temporary injunction. Eventually both organizations drop the ban, while Karsten acknowledges the right of the organizations to regulate equipment and pledges to make modifications to future designs.
- Sandy Lyle becomes the first British player to win the U.S. Masters. Lyle sweeps his approach shot to the last green out of a fairway bunker to within 15 feet (4.6 m), and sinks the resulting birdie putt for a one-shot victory over Mark Calcavecchia.
- Seve Ballesteros wins his third British Open championship in the first-ever Monday finish to the 72 holes, after the whole of Saturday's scheduled third round at Royal Lytham was lost to torrential rain. The victory, one of several around the globe for Ballesteros in 1988, helps him to finish the year on top of the Sony World Rankings.
- Curtis Strange wins the season-ending Nabisco Championships at Pebble Beach, and his $360,000 paycheck lifts his official 1988 Tour earnings to $1,147,644, and thus he becomes the first player to win over $1,000,000 in a single season. Earlier in the year Strange defeated Nick Faldo in a play-off for his first major title, the U.S. Open.

1989

- Four golfers, Doug Weaver, Mark Wiebe, Jerry Pate and Nick Price, hit aces on the par-three sixth hole on the same day in the U.S. Open at Oak Hill. Curtis Strange retains his U.S. Open crown (the first player to do so since 1951) after Tom Kite hits a final day 78 to let slip a third round lead.
- Nick Faldo sinks a 100-foot (30 m) birdie putt on the second hole at Augusta National in The Masters, the longest putt holed to date in a major tournament. Faldo goes on to win The Masters, abetted by Scott Hoch missing a short putt to win the event — a downhill effort of little more than 2 feet (0.61 m) on the first playoff hole.
- Mark Calcavecchia wins the British Open in a novel 4-hole playoff format, against Australians Wayne Grady and Greg Norman. Calcavecchia hits a five-iron out of the rough at the final hole to within six feet for the winning birdie.
- Payne Stewart, noted for his flamboyant dress (plus-fours and a sponsorship deal that sees him wear the often garish colours of the nearest NFL team) wins the PGA Championship, after a late collapse by Mike Reid.

== 1990s ==
1990

- Hall Thompson of Shoal Creek GC, on the eve of the PGA Championship at Shoal Creek, defends his club's policy of not admitting black members. Amidst a public outcry, Shoal Creek 1990 is forced to change its policy and the PGA Tour and the USGA insist that in future all clubs submit to a standard set of guidelines on membership policies. Cypress Point Club and Aronimink, among others, decide they are unable to comply and withdraw from the professional tournament arena.
- Bill Blue resigns after a short reign as LPGA Commissioner. Charles Mecham is selected as his successor.
- Construction begins on Shadow Creek Golf Club, the most expensive golf course ever built, with cost estimates ranging from $35 to $60 million as Tom Fazio creates an oasis in the Las Vegas desert. The club in 1994 vaults into eighth place on the Golf Digest top-100 course rankings, sparking controversy.
- The R & A, after 38 years, adopts the 1.68-inch (43 mm) diameter ball, and for the first time since 1910 The Rules of Golf are standardized throughout the world.
- The initial Solheim Cup is played at Lake Nona G.C., Orlando, commencing a biennial USA vs. Europe competition for women, a recognition of the growing strength of women's golf on both sides of the Atlantic.
- The Ben Hogan Tour is launched as a minor league for the PGA Tour, following the increased success of mini-tours such as the U.S. Golf Tour in 1989.
- Nick Faldo retains his U.S. Masters title, once again in a play-off (this time against Raymond Floyd). Later in the year, he adds the British Open, in a tournament that is effectively decided in the third round, where Faldo shoots a 67 while co-leader Greg Norman struggles to a 76. At the U.S. Open, however, Faldo narrowly misses out, as 45-year-old veteran Hale Irwin holes an unlikely 40-foot (12 m) putt at the last to edge him out by a shot. Irwin wins his third U.S. Open (eleven years after his second) following a playoff against Mike Donald.
- Australian Wayne Grady, who lost a playoff at the British Open in 1989, bounces back to win the PGA Championship. Fred Couples, chasing too hard, misses several short putts on the back nine when apparently poised to snatch victory.

1991

- The Ocean Course at Kiawah Island, S.C., the first course to be awarded the Ryder Cup Matches before the course has been completed, is the scene of the United States' first victory in the event since 1983. The competition comes down to a twisting putt of seven feet (2.1 m) on the 18th hole missed by Bernhard Langer in the final match (against Hale Irwin).
- Unknown John Daly wins the PGA Championship at Crooked Stick when, as ninth alternate, a slot in the tournament opens up for him on the night before the Championship begins. Daly wins an army of fans overnight with his prodigious hitting from the tees and an apparently fearless approach to putting. The golfer who withdrew and gave Daly his place, Nick Price, wins the PGA Championship in 1992 at Bellerive.
- Phil Mickelson, an amateur, wins the PGA Tour's Northern Telecom Open.
- Diminutive Welshman Ian Woosnam holds off the challenges of Tom Watson and José María Olazábal to win The Masters. The win is the most important in an increasing list of tournaments that Woosnam has won around the world since 1987, and helps him to overtake Nick Faldo at the top of the World Rankings.
- Australian Ian Baker-Finch, who was best remembered by British fans for being the 23-year-old player who had led the 1984 Open Championship after three rounds before hitting a 79 on the final day, again leads after three rounds but this time wins the British Open in comfortable style with a superb 66, against playing partner Mark O'Meara's 69.
- Oversized metal woods are introduced, with Callaway Golf's Big Bertha quickly establishing itself as the dominant brand, the Big Bertha driver becomes one of the biggest-selling clubs of all time.
- Harvey Penick's Little Red Book becomes the all-time best selling golf book.

1992

- All three American major championships are won by players who had enjoyed successful U.S. Tour careers but had, until 1992, only been able to finish runner-up at best in the majors. First, at the Masters, Fred Couples wins after final-round battle with Raymond Floyd. Then, Tom Kite (U.S. Tour leading money-winner as long ago as 1981) emerges victorious at the U.S. Open after a windswept final round at Pebble Beach that sees many of the third-round leaders shoot high scores. And finally, Nick Price - twice a runner-up at the British Open Championship - wins the PGA Championship, the start of a period of good form that would take him to the world number one position by the end of 1994. The year's other major, the British Open, is won by Nick Faldo - his fifth major title in five years. Faldo rises to the World number one position in 1992.
- Simon Clough and Boris Janic complete 18-hole rounds in five countries in one day, walking each course. They played rounds in France, Luxembourg, Belgium, the Netherlands, and Germany, and completed their journey in 16 hours, 35 minutes.
- Brittany Andres, age 6 years 19 days, scores an ace at the 85 yards (78 m) second hole at the Jimmy Clay G.C. in Austin, Texas.

1993

- An ownership group led by Joe Gibbs and Arnold Palmer announce plans for The Golf Channel, a 24-hour, 365-day cable service.
- Bernhard Langer wins his second U.S. Masters title, but the event is remembered for the criticism aimed by some commentators at Chip Beck for laying up short of the water at the 15th hole, apparently defending his second place rather than risking all to challenge Langer's 3-shot lead.
- Greg Norman also wins a second major title, the British Open. Playing scintillating golf, Norman's total of 267 is the lowest ever recorded in a major championship. However, the following month, Norman misses out on the PGA Championship, beaten in a sudden-death playoff by Paul Azinger. The defeat means Norman has lost playoffs in each of the four majors, a dubious honour he shares with Craig Wood, who lost playoffs in three of them and also the 1934 PGA Championship (in match play) final in extra holes.
- Men's Golf
  - Major championship results:
    1. April - Masters Tournament - Bernhard Langer
    2. June - U.S. Open - Lee Janzen
    3. July - The Open Championship - Greg Norman
    4. August - PGA Championship - Paul Azinger
  - PGA Tour leading money winner for the year: Nick Price - $1,478,557
  - Senior PGA Tour leading money winner: Dave Stockton - $1,175,944
  - Ryder Cup: United States team won 15–13 over the Europe team in world golf.
- Women's Golf
  - U.S. Women's Open - Lauri Merten
  - LPGA Championship - Patty Sheehan
  - Betsy King: leading money winner on the LPGA tour, earning $595,992.

1994

- Nick Price enjoys a phenomenal year, leading the U.S. Money List for the second successive season and winning both the British Open and PGA Championships. His win at the British Open comes courtesy of a 5-foot (1.5 m) eagle putt at the 17th in the final round.
- Greg Norman, shoots a course-record 264 to win the Tournament Players Championship around the famed Pete Dye designed Sawgrass course.
- Ernie Els wins a three-way playoff to become the second South African winner of the U.S. Open, against Colin Montgomerie and Loren Roberts. José María Olazábal becomes the second Spaniard to win the U.S. Masters, defeating third-round leader Tom Lehman by two shots.
- Tiger Woods becomes the youngest man ever to win the U.S. Amateur, at age 18. Several players had previously won aged 19, including Jack Nicklaus in 1959.
- Men's Golf
  - Major championship results:
    1. April - Masters Tournament - José María Olazábal
    2. June - U.S. Open - Ernie Els
    3. July - The Open Championship - Nick Price
    4. August - PGA Championship - Nick Price
  - PGA Tour leading money winner for the year: Nick Price - $1,499,927
  - Senior PGA Tour leading money winner: Dave Stockton - $1,402,519
- Women's Golf
  - U.S. Women's Open - Patty Sheehan
  - LPGA Championship - Laura Davies
  - Laura Davies: leading money winner on the LPGA tour, earning $687,201.

1995

- Days after the death of his long-time friend and mentor Harvey Penick, Ben Crenshaw wins a second U.S. Masters championship with an emotional victory over Davis Love III and Greg Norman.
- Norman also narrowly misses out at the U.S. Open, finishing second for the 7th time in a major, behind Corey Pavin.
- John Daly proves that his 1991 PGA Championship was not a fluke, as he wins the Open Championship at St Andrews after a playoff with Italian Costantino Rocca. Rocca holes a long putt at the last to force the playoff as Daly, in the clubhouse, watches on, but Daly dominates the 4-hole playoff.
- Steve Elkington wins a sudden-death playoff to collect his first major at the PGA Championship. Colin Montgomerie loses, the second year in succession he had lost a playoff in a major (a record he shares with Ben Hogan, Arnold Palmer and Tom Watson).
- Men's Golf
  - Major championship results:
    1. April - Masters Tournament - Ben Crenshaw
    2. June - U.S. Open - Corey Pavin
    3. July - The Open Championship - John Daly
    4. August - PGA Championship - Steve Elkington
  - PGA Tour leading money winner for the year: Greg Norman - $1,654,959
  - Senior PGA Tour leading money winner: Jim Colbert - $1,444,386
  - Ryder Cup: Europe won 14½ to 13½ over the United States in world team golf.
- Women's Golf
  - U.S. Women's Open - Annika Sörenstam
  - LPGA Championship - Kelly Robbins
  - Annika Sörenstam: leading money winner on the LPGA tour, earning $666,533

1996

- In one of the most astonishing final rounds in the tournament's history, Greg Norman loses a 5-shot third round lead to lose by 6, as Nick Faldo's superb 67 contrasts with Norman's dreadful 78.
- After a career seemingly curtailed several years previously by a motorcycle accident, Steve Jones wins the U.S. Open. Both Davis Love III and Tom Lehman finish just short of Jones. Lehman (as at the 1994 Masters and 1995 U.S. Open) leads on Saturday night but cannot hold on. At the British Open, Lehman again leads after three rounds, but this time is able to finish the job, winning his first major title. The PGA Championship also goes to a first-time major winner as Mark Brooks beats Kenny Perry in a sudden-death playoff after a two-shot swing (Perry bogeyed and Brooks birdied) at the 72nd hole.
- Tiger Woods became the first golfer to win three consecutive U.S. Amateur titles. This was the sixth consecutive year in which he won a USGA championship, one short of Bobby Jones' record of seven. In September, he turned professional. He receives a number of sponsors' invitations to PGA Tour events, but is still expected by most to have to return to the qualifying school to earn a full players' card for 1997. However, in the last five regular tournaments of the year on the PGA Tour, his finishes were 5–3–1–3–1, placing him among the tour's top 30 money-winners for the year and thereby qualifying him for the season-ending The Tour Championship. Woods was named the PGA Tour's Rookie of the Year.
- Although unable to win a major championship, Colin Montgomerie tops both the World Money List and the World ranking points list for 1996. Greg Norman however narrowly remains the official world number one as the system takes into account points earned over a 24-month period.
- Men's Golf
  - Major championship results:
    1. April - Masters Tournament - Nick Faldo
    2. June - U.S. Open - Steve Jones
    3. July - The Open Championship - Tom Lehman
    4. August - PGA Championship - Mark Brooks
  - PGA Tour leading money winner for the year: Tom Lehman - $1,780,159
  - Senior PGA Tour leading money winner: Jim Colbert - $1,627,890
- Women's Golf
  - U.S. Women's Open - Annika Sörenstam
  - LPGA Championship - Laura Davies
  - Karrie Webb is the leading money winner on the LPGA tour with earnings of $1,002,000 becoming the first ever woman to earn more than a million dollars in one golf season.

1997

- In his first major championship as a professional, Tiger Woods becomes the youngest-ever Masters Champion at 21 years 3 months, while setting a 72-hole scoring record of 270 (18 under par), and winning by a record margin (12 shots). He also becomes the first golfer of either Asian or African descent to win a men's major title. Woods wins three other tournaments in 1997 to top the U.S. Money list in what is effectively his rookie season. Even though Woods becomes the first player to earn more than $2m in a season, however, his earnings are surpassed by the leading player on the Senior PGA Tour, Hale Irwin, who wins 9 times.
- Ernie Els wins a second U.S. Open, once again defeating Colin Montgomerie in a close finish. Tom Lehman, once again, led after three rounds, but again was unable to win the title.
- 25-year-old Justin Leonard made up a 5-shot final-round deficit with a 65 to win his first major championship, the British Open, by two shots from Jesper Parnevik and Darren Clarke. A month later, Leonard finished runner-up to Davis Love III at the PGA Championship.
- Men's Golf
  - Major championship results:
    1. April - Masters Tournament - Tiger Woods
    2. June - U.S. Open - Ernie Els
    3. July - The Open Championship - Justin Leonard
    4. August - PGA Championship - Davis Love III
  - PGA Tour leading money winner for the year: Tiger Woods - $2,066,833
  - Senior PGA Tour leading money winner: Hale Irwin - $2,343,364
  - Ryder Cup: Europe won 14½–13½ over the United States in world team golf.
- Women's Golf
  - U.S. Women's Open - Alison Nicholas
  - LPGA Championship - Christa Johnson
  - Annika Sörenstam: leading money winner on the LPGA tour, earning $1,236,789.

1998

- At the age of 41, Mark O'Meara wins his first major championship, the Masters, becoming one of the few champions in history to birdie the last hole to win. Runner-up is 26-year-old David Duval who would win four times on the regular tour to lead the money list, as Tiger Woods - after his meteoric first season - wins just once. In July, O'Meara wins a second major title - this time the British Open, after a playoff with Brian Watts, an American golfer whose career had mostly been played on the Japan Golf Tour. Watts is forced to play a bunker shot at the 72nd hole with only one foot in the sand, needing a par to force the playoff, and very nearly holes the shot. The British Open is also notable for the remarkable tournament enjoyed by 18-year-old amateur Justin Rose, who finishes fourth after being in touch with the lead throughout the final round.
- Lee Janzen wins a second U.S. Open title, and as in 1993, Payne Stewart finishes runner-up. Stewart's 20-foot (6.1 m) putt to tie at the last rolls across the lip but does not drop.
- Fijian Vijay Singh, a regular winner on both the European and U.S. Tours since the early 1990s, wins the PGA Championship. With a round to play, both player of the season Mark O'Meara and 1997's sensation Tiger Woods are within five shots of the lead, but Singh holds on for victory. Singh, an Indian Fijian, becomes the second golfer of Asian descent to win a men's major.
- Se Ri Pak becomes the first South Korean on the LPGA Tour and makes an immediate impact, winning two majors (the LPGA Championship and U.S. Women's Open) and two other events. She proved to be only the first of a wave of Korean players on the tour; a decade after her arrival in the U.S., she was joined on the LPGA Tour by 44 other Koreans, and the tour's single biggest source of revenue was the sale of TV broadcast rights in South Korea. The season's first major was also won by a golfer of Asian descent; the Nabisco Dinah Shore was won by Pat Hurst, an American with a white father and Japanese mother.
- Men's Golf
  - Major championship results:
    1. April - Masters Tournament - Mark O'Meara
    2. June - U.S. Open - Lee Janzen
    3. July - The Open Championship - Mark O'Meara
    4. August - PGA Championship - Vijay Singh
  - PGA Tour leading money winner for the year: David Duval - $2,591,031
  - Senior PGA Tour leading money winner: Hale Irwin - $2,861,945
- Women's Golf
  - Major championship results:
    - Nabisco Dinah Shore Championship: Pat Hurst
    - LPGA Championship: Se Ri Pak
    - U.S. Women's Open: Se Ri Pak
    - du Maurier Classic: Brandie Burton
  - Annika Sörenstam: leading money winner on the LPGA tour, earning $1,092,748

1999

- After several years suffering from a recurring foot injury that at times left him unable to walk, José María Olazábal wins a second U.S. Masters crown. Greg Norman is yet again left trailing in the victor's wake, finishing third.
- Payne Stewart wins his second U.S. Open, and third major title in all, by a shot from Phil Mickelson. In October, Stewart would be among the victims of an air accident, caused by a sudden loss of cabin pressure in their Learjet.
- In one of the most extraordinary and ultimately farcical major championships in history, unknown local player Paul Lawrie wins the British Open championship at Carnoustie, after similarly unknown French player Jean van de Velde contrives to take a seven at the par-four final hole, when six would have won the title. The error is caused initially by a wildly pushed second shot that ricochets off the grandstand and into thick rough, from where Van de Velde chops his third shot into a burn in front of the green. Van de Velde drops back into a playoff with Lawrie and Justin Leonard, who had also previously found the burn at the 72nd hole in an attempt to put pressure on Van de Velde.
- 23-year-old Tiger Woods wins his second major title, the PGA Championship, by a shot from 19-year-old Spaniard Sergio García. Despite losing, García hits the most memorable shot of the tournament, a brilliant deliberate slice from the roots of a tree that finds the green in the final round.
- David Duval wins four events on the U.S. Tour before the Masters, including the Tournament Players' Championship, and briefly becomes number one in the World rankings. He finishes the year second on the ranking list behind Woods.
- The United States regain the Ryder Cup in a controversial end to the singles matches at Brookline. As Justin Leonard holes a lengthy putt in his crucial match with José María Olazábal, several U.S. players and their wives dash across the green to congratulate him, some of them across Olazábal's line, neglecting to respect the fact that the Spaniard still had a putt to win. Olazábal misses his putt, but the Europeans were aggrieved at what they perceived as a lack of sporting behavior.
- The World Golf Championships, which bring together the leading players in the World Rankings for four events each season (one at match play, two at stroke play, and one - the revamped World Cup - a two-man team event), are inaugurated. The first event, the 64-man WGC-Andersen Consulting Match Play Championship, provides a surprise champion in Jeff Maggert; Tiger Woods wins the following two.
- Men's Golf
  - Major championship results:
    1. April - Masters Tournament - José María Olazábal
    2. June - U.S. Open - Payne Stewart
    3. July - The Open Championship - Paul Lawrie
    4. August - PGA Championship - Tiger Woods
  - PGA Tour leading money winner for the year: Tiger Woods - $6,616,585
  - Senior PGA Tour leading money winner: Bruce Fleisher - $2,515,705
  - Ryder Cup: United States won 14½ to 13½ over Europe in world team golf.
- Women's Golf
  - U.S. Women's Open - Juli Inkster
  - LPGA Championship - Juli Inkster
  - Karrie Webb: leading money winner on the LPGA tour, earning $1,591,959
