= Old Marsh Golf Club =

Private golf club in Palm Beach Gardens, Florida

- Interactive map of Old Marsh Golf Club
- 26°52′12″N 80°9′13″W

Club information
- Location: Palm Beach Gardens, Florida, United States
- Established: 1987
- Type: Private
- Total holes: 18
- Tournaments: U.S. Women's Mid-Amateur (1992)
- Website: oldmarshgolf.com

Old Marsh Golf Club
- Designed by: Pete Dye
- Length: 7,039 yd (6,436 m)
- Slope rating: 152

Old Marsh Golf Club is a private golf club in Palm Beach Gardens, Florida. Its 18-hole course was designed by Pete Dye and opened in 1987. The club hosted the 1992 U.S. Women's Mid-Amateur, and the course appeared in Golf Digest's ranking of America's 100 Greatest Golf Courses from 1991 through 1994.

== History ==
Dye laid out the course on a 440-acre (180 ha) site within a nature preserve between Jupiter and North Palm Beach. Golf Digest reported that the environmental permitting and authorization of wetland setbacks took several years. The course opened in 1987.

In 2004, Dye returned to oversee a renovation. A contemporary feature described him directing changes in the field, including new contours, bunkers and greens. The club completed another renovation in 2016 under the guidance of Dye and members of his family. In a 2026 survey of restoration work on Dye courses, GolfPass reported that longtime Dye associate Chris Lutzke had also consulted at Old Marsh.

== Course design ==
The course measures 7,039 yd (6,436 m) and has a slope rating of 152. Its holes occupy separated corridors through natural and constructed marshland. Dye kept the course comparatively low-profile to preserve views across the site and allow a bump-and-run style of play.

The par-4 fifth hole is Dye's version of an Alps-style template hole, with a blind approach over a large mound in front of the green. Palm Beach Illustrated described the hole as measuring 362 yd (331 m) from the tour tees, with bunkers and water protecting the green. Because the landing area is obscured, a bell near the green signals when the group ahead has finished the hole.

== Championship and rankings ==
At the 1992 U.S. Women's Mid-Amateur, Marion Maney-McInerney defeated Carol Semple Thompson on the 19th hole of the final.

Golf Digest ranked Old Marsh 74th in its 1991–1992 list of America's 100 Greatest Golf Courses and 78th in 1993–1994. The magazine also ranked it among Florida's top ten courses from 1991 through 1997 and 26th in the state for 2025–2026.
