= Barbara Fay White =

American golfer (1940–2004)

Barbara Fay White Boddie (April 14, 1940 – October 15, 2004) was an American golfer between the 1960s and 1990s. During the 1960s, White had victories twice at the Louisiana Women's Amateur Championship and Women's Western Amateur. Her American team was the Curtis Cup champion and Espirito Santo Trophy runner-up that year. Following her marriage, Boddie won the Curtis Cup and Espirito Santo Trophy in 1966. She also was first at the 1970 Louisiana Women's Amateur Championship.

On the LPGA Tour, White was tied for sixth at the 1969 Shreveport Kiwanis Invitational. She played as a professional golfer on the LPGA Tour between 1973 and 1977. During this time period, Boddie tied for sixth at the 1973 Waco Tribune Herald Ladies Classic. Apart from playing, she was a gym teacher at Centenary College of Louisiana from 1964 to 1966. Her Crooked Hollow Golf Club co-creation debuted in 1992. Boddie was posthumously inducted into the Louisiana Sports Hall of Fame during 2008.

== Early life ==
White was born in Shreveport, Louisiana on April 14, 1940. She started playing golf during her childhood. Throughout the 1950s, White focused on quarterhorses and limited her golfing. She returned her focus to golf during 1959.

Leading up to 1963, White attended Texas Christian University and studied physical education. She also went to Centenary College of Louisiana in 1960. White was a semi-finalist at that year's Women's Collegiate Golf Tournament. She was a postgraduate at the University of North Texas during the mid-to-late 1960s.

== Career ==
=== Early career ===
White was first at the Louisiana Women's Amateur Championship during 1962 and 1965. During this time period, White was a semi-finalist at the 1963 Trans-Mississippi Women's Amateur. She was a quarter-finalist at the North and South Women's Amateur Golf Championship and British Women's Amateur during 1964. White had Women's Western Amateur victories in 1964 and 1965.

White was tied for 33rd at the Titleholders Championship and tied for 18th at the U.S. Women's Open during 1964. These events were held as LPGA major championships. With the American team that year, she was a Curtis Cup champion and Espirito Santo Trophy runner-up. Apart from her playing career, White was hired by Centenary College as a gym teacher during 1964. She was chair of the Shreveport Kiwanis Invitational the following year.

=== Later career ===
As Barbara Fay White Boddie, she focused on teaching until 1966. Boddie was a semifinalist at the 1966 U.S. Women's Amateur. She was also first in that year's Curtis Cup and Espirito Santo Trophy with the United States. Boddie was scheduled to play in the 1968 Curtis Cup. Her pregnancy led her to withdraw from the event. Boddie won the 1970 Louisiana Women's Amateur Championship. She reached the semifinals during the 1972 U.S. Women's Amateur.

At LPGA Tour events, she continued her chair experience at the Shreveport Kiwanis Invitational until 1967. Boddie was tied for sixth at the 1969 edition. Boddie "never had the desire to play as a professional" before her reconsideration in 1973. Boddie received a spot in the LPGA Tour that year. She started competing as a professional golfer and was tied for sixth at the Waco Tribune Herald Ladies Classic.

Boddie decided to end her professional golf career in 1977. She "regained her amateur status in 1979 after a two-year probationary period." Boddie cited travel issues while describing her LPGA experience in a 1981 interview. Her amateur career resumed that year. She reached the third round during the 1990 U.S. Senior Women's Amateur.

In 1979, she began managing the Par Three Golf Course. Boddie continued to work there up to 1990. During this time period, Boddie started to create the Crooked Hollow Golf Club with Jim Lipe in 1984. The debut of their club occurred in 1992.

== Honors ==
White was "the outstanding woman athlete in Louisiana for 1964". This award was from a branch of the Veterans of Foreign Wars. Boddie was posthumously inducted into the Louisiana Sports Hall of Fame during 2008.

== Personal life and death ==
Boddie's marriage started in 1965. She had three children before her 1978 divorce. By 2004, White was experiencing amyotrophic lateral sclerosis. This led to her October 15, 2004 death.
