= Meredith Duncan =

American professional golfer (born 1980)

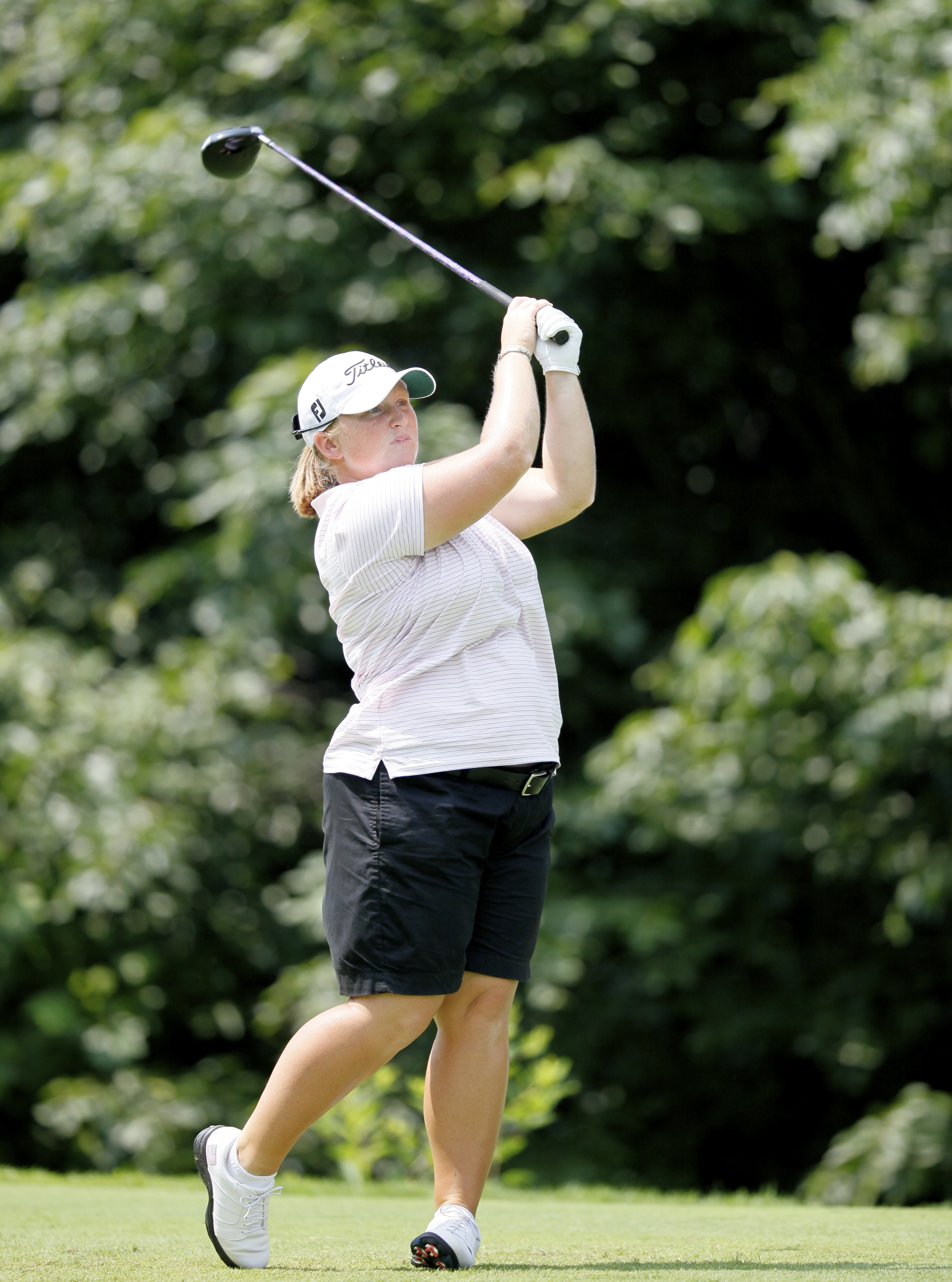
- Duncan at the 2009 LPGA Championship

Personal information
- Nationality: United States
- Born: March 25, 1980 (age 46) Shreveport, Louisiana, U.S.
- Height: 5 ft 1 in (1.55 m)

Career
- Sport: Golf
- College: Louisiana State University
- Turned professional: 2002
- Former tours: LPGA Tour; Futures Tour

Best results in LPGA major championships
- Chevron Championship: 73rd: 2002
- Women's PGA C'ship: T81: 2007
- U.S. Women's Open: T65: 2010
- Women's British Open: T24: 2008

Meredith Duncan (born March 25, 1980) is an American professional golfer.

== Early life and amateur career ==
In 1980, Duncan was born in Shreveport, Louisiana. She attended the Louisiana State University (LSU).

She won the Women's Western Amateur in 2000 and 2001. She won the 2001 North and South Women's Amateur at Pinehurst. She followed this up by capturing that year's U.S. Women's Amateur in a match that the USGA says "veteran observers called the greatest final in the history of the United States Golf Association championships." She also played on the U.S. team at the 2002 Curtis Cup. In 2003, Duncan graduated from LSU with a degree in kinesiology.

== Professional career ==
In 2002, while still in college, Duncan turned professional. She has played on the LPGA Tour and the Futures Tour.

Duncan now works at C.E. Byrd High School in Shreveport. She serves as the head golf coach, pep squad sponsor, assistant basketball coach, and physical education instructor.

== Amateur wins ==
- 2000 Women's Western Amateur
- 2001 Women's Western Amateur, North and South Women's Amateur, U.S. Women's Amateur

== Team appearances ==
Amateur

- Curtis Cup (representing the United States): 2002 (winners)
