= 1936 Women's Western Open =

Golf tournament

The 1936 Women's Western Open was a golf competition held at Topeka Country Club in Topeka, Kansas. It was the 7th edition of the Women's Western Open. Opal Hill won the championship in match play competition by defeating Virginia Wilson Dennehy in the final match, 3 and 2.
