= Carolyn Cudone =

American amateur golfer (1918–2009)

- Born: September 7, 1918; Oxford, Alabama, U.S.
- Died: March 1, 2009 (aged 90); Myrtle Beach, South Carolina, U.S.
- Occupation: Golfer
- Known for: The Carolyn Cudone Intercollegiate Championship

Carolyn Cassidy Cudone (September 7, 1918 – March 1, 2009) was an American amateur golfer.

== Early life ==
In 1918, Cudone was born in Oxford, Alabama. She was raised in Staten Island, New York.

== Career ==
Cudone is best known for her performance as a seniors' golfer. Among her amateur career successes was her 1958 victory at the North and South Women's Amateur. She was a member of the 1956 U.S. Curtis Cup team and in 1970 was team captain.

However, it was at the U.S. Senior Women's Amateur where she enjoyed her most noted success. Of the ten Championships she participated in, Cudone won a record five straight titles between 1968 and 1972, the most wins in a row in any USGA championship.

Cudone was a member of the Dunes Golf and Beach Club in Myrtle Beach, South Carolina.

== Awards and honors ==
- In 1979, Cudone was inducted into the South Carolina Golf Hall of Fame.
- In 2000, she was inducted into the Staten Island Sports Hall of Fame
- In 2009, she was inducted into the Myrtle Beach Golf Hall of Fame.
- The Carolyn Cudone Intercollegiate Championship is named in her honor.

== Amateur wins ==
- 1955 New Jersey State Women's Golf Championship, Women's Metropolitan Amateur
- 1956 New Jersey State Women's Golf Championship
- 1958 North and South Women's Amateur
- 1959 New Jersey State Women's Golf Championship
- 1960 New Jersey State Women's Golf Championship
- 1961 Women's Metropolitan Amateur
- 1963 New Jersey State Women's Golf Championship, Women's Metropolitan Amateur
- 1964 Women's Metropolitan Amateur
- 1965 New Jersey State Women's Golf Championship, Women's Metropolitan Amateur
- 1968 U.S. Senior Women's Amateur
- 1969 U.S. Senior Women's Amateur
- 1970 U.S. Senior Women's Amateur
- 1971 U.S. Senior Women's Amateur
- 1972 U.S. Senior Women's Amateur

== Team appearances ==
Amateur

- Curtis Cup (representing the United States): 1956, 1970 (non-playing captain, winners)

== See also ==
- List of female golfers
- List of American Curtis Cup golfers
- List of people from Staten Island § Golf
- Timeline of golf history (1945–1999) § 1970s
- United States Golf Association § Most career USGA championships won
