= Newport, Nebraska =

Village in Rock County, Nebraska, United States

- Village
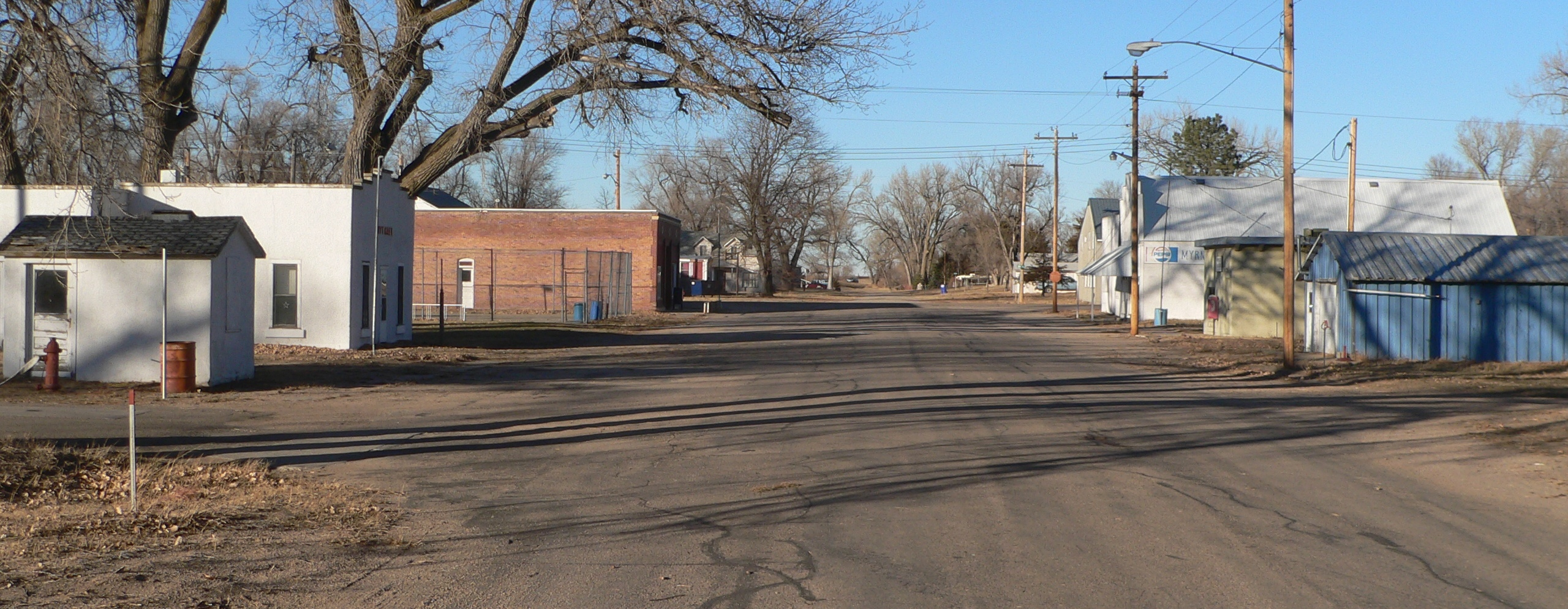
- Downtown Newport: 2nd Street

- Location of Newport, Nebraska
- Coordinates: 42°36′01″N 99°19′42″W
- Country: United States
- State: Nebraska
- County: Rock

Area
  - Total: 0.32 sq mi (0.82 km^{2})
  - Land: 0.32 sq mi (0.82 km^{2})
  - Water: 0 sq mi (0.00 km^{2})
- Elevation: 2,234 ft (681 m)

Population (2020)
  - Total: 68
  - Density: 214/sq mi (82.6/km^{2})
- Time zone: UTC-6 (Central (CST))
  - Summer (DST): UTC-5 (CDT)
- ZIP code: 68759
- Area codes: 402 and 531
- FIPS code: 31-34265
- GNIS feature ID: 2399493

Newport is a village in Rock County, Nebraska, United States. As of the 2020 census, Newport had a population of 68.

== History ==
Newport was established circa 1880 when the railroad was extended to that point. It took its name from the Newport bridge over the Niobrara River.

== Education ==
Newport has one school available local to the area, Newport Grade School. The school is a public school with eight students and two teachers.

== Geography ==
According to the United States Census Bureau, the village has a total area of 0.32 square miles (0.83 km^{2}), all land.

=== Climate ===
Climate data for Newport, Nebraska (1991–2020)
| Month | Jan | Feb | Mar | Apr | May | Jun | Jul | Aug | Sep | Oct | Nov | Dec | Year |
|---|---|---|---|---|---|---|---|---|---|---|---|---|---|
| Mean daily maximum °F (°C) | 31.8 (−0.1) | 35.5 (1.9) | 46.5 (8.1) | 56.5 (13.6) | 67.5 (19.7) | 78.2 (25.7) | 85.1 (29.5) | 83.1 (28.4) | 74.8 (23.8) | 60.4 (15.8) | 45.9 (7.7) | 34.3 (1.3) | 58.3 (14.6) |
| Daily mean °F (°C) | 21.2 (−6.0) | 24.5 (−4.2) | 34.6 (1.4) | 44.9 (7.2) | 56.5 (13.6) | 67.1 (19.5) | 73.1 (22.8) | 70.9 (21.6) | 61.8 (16.6) | 47.5 (8.6) | 34.2 (1.2) | 24.0 (−4.4) | 46.7 (8.2) |
| Mean daily minimum °F (°C) | 10.5 (−11.9) | 13.5 (−10.3) | 22.6 (−5.2) | 33.3 (0.7) | 45.4 (7.4) | 55.9 (13.3) | 61.2 (16.2) | 58.6 (14.8) | 48.9 (9.4) | 34.7 (1.5) | 22.5 (−5.3) | 13.7 (−10.2) | 35.1 (1.7) |
| Average precipitation inches (mm) | 0.58 (15) | 0.82 (21) | 1.46 (37) | 3.17 (81) | 4.06 (103) | 3.99 (101) | 3.44 (87) | 2.96 (75) | 2.75 (70) | 2.23 (57) | 0.77 (20) | 0.86 (22) | 27.09 (689) |
| Average snowfall inches (cm) | 7.0 (18) | 7.7 (20) | 7.2 (18) | 5.9 (15) | 0.4 (1.0) | 0.0 (0.0) | 0.0 (0.0) | 0.0 (0.0) | 0.0 (0.0) | 1.8 (4.6) | 4.5 (11) | 7.0 (18) | 41.5 (105.6) |
Source: NOAA

== Demographics ==
Historical population
| Census | Pop. | Note | %± |
|---|---|---|---|
| 1900 | 208 | | — |
| 1910 | 268 | | 28.8% |
| 1920 | 430 | | 60.4% |
| 1930 | 273 | | −36.5% |
| 1940 | 275 | | 0.7% |
| 1950 | 207 | | −24.7% |
| 1960 | 162 | | −21.7% |
| 1970 | 141 | | −13.0% |
| 1980 | 141 | | 0.0% |
| 1990 | 136 | | −3.5% |
| 2000 | 98 | | −27.9% |
| 2010 | 97 | | −1.0% |
| 2020 | 68 | | −29.9% |
U.S. Decennial Census

=== 2010 census ===
As of the census of 2010, there were 97 people, 44 households, and 29 families residing in the village. The population density was 303.1 inhabitants per square mile (117.0/km^{2}). There were 57 housing units at an average density of 178.1 per square mile (68.8/km^{2}). The racial makeup of the village was 97.9% White and 2.1% Native American.

There were 44 households, of which 22.7% had children under the age of 18 living with them, 59.1% were married couples living together, 6.8% had a female householder with no husband present, and 34.1% were non-families. 34.1% of all households were made up of individuals, and 20.5% had someone living alone who was 65 years of age or older. The average household size was 2.20 and the average family size was 2.83.

The median age in the village was 48.5 years. 19.6% of residents were under the age of 18; 5.1% were between the ages of 18 and 24; 16.5% were from 25 to 44; 34% were from 45 to 64; and 24.7% were 65 years of age or older. The gender makeup of the village was 50.5% male and 49.5% female.

=== 2000 census ===
As of the census of 2000, there were 98 people, 45 households, and 30 families residing in the village. The population density was 312.1 inhabitants per square mile (120.5/km^{2}). There were 58 housing units at an average density of 184.7 per square mile (71.3/km^{2}). The racial makeup of the village was 98.98% White and 1.02% Native American. Hispanic or Latino of any race were 2.04% of the population.

There were 45 households, out of which 33.3% had children under the age of 18 living with them, 42.2% were married couples living together, 17.8% had a female householder with no husband present, and 33.3% were non-families. 28.9% of all households were made up of individuals, and 13.3% had someone living alone who was 65 years of age or older. The average household size was 2.18 and the average family size was 2.67.

In the village, the population was spread out, with 25.5% under the age of 18, 3.1% from 18 to 24, 25.5% from 25 to 44, 28.6% from 45 to 64, and 17.3% who were 65 years of age or older. The median age was 42 years. For every 100 females, there were 84.9 males. For every 100 females age 18 and over, there were 78.0 males.

As of 2000 the median income for a household in the village was $28,750, and the median income for a family was $38,750. Males had a median income of $24,063 versus $20,313 for females. The per capita income for the village was $15,785. There were 12.9% of families and 12.9% of the population living below the poverty line, including 17.4% of under eighteens and none of those over 64.

== Notable person ==
- Opal Hill, golfer, winner of the 1935 and 1936 Women's Western Open

== See also ==
- List of municipalities in Nebraska
