= 1935 Women's Western Open =

Golf tournament

Coordinates: 42°06′48″N 87°47′45″W

The 1935 Women's Western Open was a golf competition held at Sunset Ridge Country Club near Chicago, Illinois. It was the 6th edition of the Women's Western Open. Opal Hill won the championship in match play competition by defeating Elaine Rosenthal Reinhardt in the final match, 9 and 7.
