= Bessie Anthony =

American golfer (1880–1912)

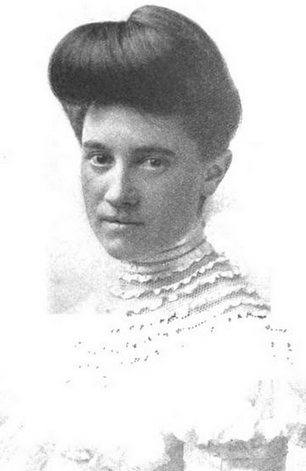
Bessie Anthony, from a 1903 publication

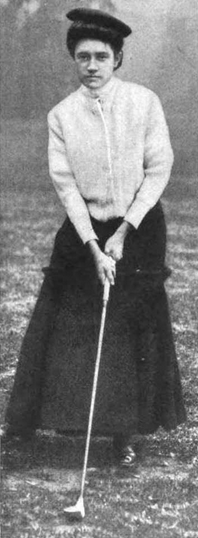
Bessie Anthony, from a 1903 publication

Bessie Anthony (March 19, 1880 – November 22, 1912) was an American amateur golfer. She was the U.S. Women's Amateur in 1903, and won the Women's Western Amateur tournament in its first three years, 1901, 1902, and 1903.

== Early life ==
Anthony was from Evanston, Illinois. Her father Charles E. Anthony was a lawyer in Chicago. Her sister Miriam Anthony also played golf.

== Career ==
Anthony helped to found the Women's Western Golf Association in 1903, and, as a member of the Glenview Golf Club, won the organization's first three annual tournaments, all held at Chicago courses. In 1901, the New York Times reported that "Miss Anthony fairly electrified the gallery by her dashing play" at a tournament in New Jersey. That year, she also set a new record score for women's play at the Onwentsia golf course.

In 1902, she set a new record score at the Midlothian golf course. Also in 1902, Robert Todd Lincoln presented a sterling silver jewelry box to Anthony, to mark her win at the Chicago Golf Club.

In 1903, after defeating fellow Chicagoan Johnnie Anna Carpenter in the finals, she was the U.S. Women's Amateur champion, the first "western" player to win that title. By then, she had announced her engagement to marry, and that she would not defend her title in 1904. There were reports that she would have postponed the wedding if she did not win the championship.

== Personal life ==
Bessie Anthony married fellow golfer Bernard S. Horne in late 1903, at the First Presbyterian Church in Evanston. They lived in Virginia, where she raised horses. The Hornes had four sons together before she died in 1912, along with her infant daughter, in Keswick, Virginia, aged 32 years.
