= Opal Hill =

American professional golfer (1892–1981)

Personal information
- Full name: Opal S. Trout Hill
- Nationality: United States
- Born: June 2, 1892 Newport, Nebraska, U.S.
- Died: June 23, 1981 (aged 89) Kansas City, Missouri, U.S.

Career
- Sport: Golf
- Turned professional: 1938
- Former tour: LPGA Tour (founder)
- Professional wins: 2

Number of wins by tour
- LPGA Tour: 2

Best results in LPGA major championships (wins: 2)
- Western Open: Won: 1935, 1936
- Titleholders C'ship: 7th: 1939
- U.S. Women's Open: T18: 1947

Opal S. Trout Hill (June 2, 1892 – June 23, 1981) was an American professional golfer. She won the Women's Western Open in 1935 and 1936.

Opal Trout was born in Newport, Nebraska but was raised in Kansas City, Missouri. She married Oscar S. Hill, an attorney. As she was suffering from a lingering kidney infection, her doctor recommended mild exercise and she took up golf at the age of 31. She won numerous amateur tournaments.

Hill became a golf professional in 1938, and was one of the 13 founders of the Ladies Professional Golf Association in 1950.

Hill died in Kansas City, Missouri at the age of 89.

== Amateur wins ==
this list is incomplete

- 1928 Trans-Mississippi Women's Amateur, North and South Women's Amateur
- 1929 Women's Western Amateur, Trans-Mississippi Women's Amateur
- 1931 Women's Western Amateur, Trans-Mississippi Women's Amateur
- 1932 Women's Western Amateur
- 1934 Trans-Mississippi Women's Amateur
- 1935 Missouri Women's Amateur
- 1936 Missouri Women's Amateur
- 1937 Missouri Women's Amateur

== Major championships ==
=== Wins (2) ===
| Year | Championship | Winning score | Runner-up |
|---|---|---|---|
| 1935 | Women's Western Open | 9 & 7 | (United States) Mrs. S.L. Reinhart (a) |
| 1936 | Women's Western Open | 3 & 2 | (United States) Mrs. Charles Dennehy (a) |

== Team appearances ==
Amateur

- Curtis Cup (representing the United States): 1932 (winners), 1934 (winners), 1936 (tie, Cup retained)
