= Women's Western Amateur =

The Women's Western Amateur is an amateur golf tournament for women. It is organized by the Women's Western Golf Association, which also organized the Women's Western Open from 1930 to 1967. It is one of the oldest women's amateur tournaments in the United States, having been played since 1901. Like many other amateur tournaments, it uses a stroke play qualifier to determine the final match play field.

== Winners ==
- 2026 Kylee Choi
- 2025 Maelynn Kim
- 2024 Farah O'Keefe
- 2023 Jasmine Koo
- 2022 Taglao Jeeravivitaporn
- 2021 Marissa Wenzler
- 2020 Brigitte Thibault
- 2019 Sarah Shipley
- 2018 Emilee Hoffman
- 2017 Maddie Szeryk
- 2016 Jillian Hollis
- 2015 Fai Khamborn
- 2014 Mika Liu
- 2013 Ashlan Ramsey
- 2012 Ariya Jutanugarn
- 2011 Victoria Tanco
- 2010 Jaclyn Jansen
- 2009 Taylore Karle
- 2008 Jennie Arseneault
- 2007 Mallory Blackwelder
- 2006 Stacy Lewis
- 2005 Jennifer Hong
- 2004 Sophia Sheridan
- 2003 Brittany Lang
- 2002 Janice Olivencia
- 2001 Meredith Duncan
- 2000 Meredith Duncan
- 1999 Kellee Booth
- 1998 Grace Park
- 1997 Stephanie Keever
- 1996 Mary Burkhardt Shields
- 1995 Cristie Kerr
- 1994 Stephanie Neill
- 1993 Stephanie Sparks
- 1992 Moira Dunn
- 1991 Sarah LeBrun Ingram
- 1990 Patricia Cornett Iker
- 1989 Katie Peterson
- 1988 Anne Quast Sander
- 1987 Kathleen McCarthy
- 1986 Leslie Shannon
- 1985 Kathleen McCarthy
- 1984 Joanne Pacillo
- 1983 Tammy Welborn
- 1982 Lisa Stanley
- 1981 Amy Benz
- 1980 Kathy Baker
- 1979 Mary Hafeman
- 1978 Beth Daniel
- 1977 Lauren Howe
- 1976 Nancy Lopez
- 1975 Debbie Massey
- 1974 Lancy Smith
- 1973 Katie Falk
- 1972 Debbie Massey
- 1971 Beth Barry
- 1970 Jane Bastanchury
- 1969 Jane Bastanchury
- 1968 Catherine Lacoste
- 1967 Dorothy Germain Porter
- 1966 Peggy Conley
- 1965 Barbara Fay White
- 1964 Barbara Fay White
- 1963 Barbara McIntire
- 1962 Carol Sorenson
- 1961 Anne Quast Sander
- 1960 Mrs. Ann Casey Johnston
- 1959 JoAnne Gunderson
- 1958 Barbara McIntire
- 1957 Meriam Bailey
- 1956 Anne Quast
- 1955 Patricia Lesser
- 1954 Claire Doran
- 1953 Claire Doran
- 1952 Polly Riley
- 1951 Marjorie Lindsay
- 1950 Polly Riley
- 1949 Helen Sigel
- 1948 Dot Kielty
- 1947 Louise Suggs
- 1946 Louise Suggs
- 1945 Phyllis Otto
- 1944 Dorothy Germain
- 1943 Dorothy Germain
- 1942 Betty Jameson
- 1941 Mrs. Russell Mann
- 1940 Betty Jameson
- 1939 Edith Estabrooks
- 1938 Patty Berg
- 1937 Marion Miley
- 1936 Dorothy Traung
- 1935 Marion Miley
- 1934 Mrs. L. D. Cheney
- 1933 Lucille Robinson
- 1932 Opal Hill
- 1931 Opal Hill
- 1930 Mrs. G. W. Tyson
- 1929 Opal Hill
- 1928 Mrs. Harry Pressler
- 1927 Mrs. Harry Pressler
- 1926 Dorothy Page
- 1925 Elaine Rosenthal Reinhardt
- 1924 Edith Cummings
- 1923 Miriam Burns
- 1922 Mrs. David Gaut
- 1921 Mrs. Melvin Jones
- 1920 Mrs. F. C. Letts, Jr.
- 1919 Mrs. Perry W. Fiske
- 1918 Elaine Rosenthal
- 1917 Mrs. F. C. Letts, Jr.
- 1916 Mrs. F. C. Letts, Jr.
- 1915 Elaine Rosenthal
- 1914 Mrs. H. D. Hammond
- 1913 Myra B. Helmer
- 1912 Caroline Painter
- 1911 Caroline Painter
- 1910 Mrs. Thurston Harris
- 1909 Vida Llewellyn
- 1908 Mrs. W. France Anderson
- 1907 Lillian French
- 1906 Mrs. C. L. Dering
- 1905 Mrs. C. L. Dering
- 1904 Frances Everett
- 1903 Bessie Anthony
- 1902 Bessie Anthony
- 1901 Bessie Anthony
