= Dorothy Germain Porter =

American golfer (1924–2012)

Dorothy Germain Porter (April 3, 1924 – July 20, 2012) was an American amateur golfer.

Born in Philadelphia, Pennsylvania, Dorothy Germain began playing golf at 11. She graduated from Beaver College (now Arcadia University), where she played field hockey. In the early 1940s, Porter won a number of Philadelphia junior and amateur golf championships, and in 1946 she captured the first of her three Pennsylvania Women's Amateurs. She won the Women's Western Amateur in 1943, 1944, and 1967.

In 1949 she won the U.S. Women's Amateur. Porter was a member of the U.S. team that won the 1950 Curtis Cup and captained the 1966 team to victory. In 1977, she became the first Women's Amateur Champion to win the U.S. Senior Women's Amateur. She went on to win the Seniors' title again in 1980, 1981, and 1983. In 1984, she captained the winning U.S. Espirito Santo Trophy team.

Porter was inducted into the Philadelphia Sports Hall of Fame in 2008.

She was married to Mark A. Porter, an amateur golfer with whom she often played in tournaments, from 1946 until his death in 1996. She was the mother of three children.

== Significant tournament wins ==
- 1943 Women's Western Amateur
- 1944 Women's Western Amateur
- 1946 Pennsylvania Women's Amateur, Philadelphia Women's Amateur
- 1949 U.S. Women's Amateur
- 1952 Pennsylvania Women's Amateur
- 1955 Pennsylvania Women's Amateur
- 1956 Philadelphia Women's Amateur
- 1959 Philadelphia Women's Amateur
- 1962 Philadelphia Women's Amateur
- 1967 Women's Western Amateur, New Jersey Women's Amateur
- 1969 Eastern Amateur, Philadelphia Women's Amateur
- 1970 Philadelphia Women's Amateur
- 1973 Philadelphia Women's Amateur
- 1977 U.S. Senior Women's Amateur
- 1980 U.S. Senior Women's Amateur
- 1981 U.S. Senior Women's Amateur
- 1983 U.S. Senior Women's Amateur, Philadelphia Women's Amateur
- 1992 Philadelphia Women's Amateur

== Team appearances ==
Amateur

- Curtis Cup (representing the United States): 1950 (winners), 1966 (non-playing captain, winners)
