= United States Golf Association =

Governing body for golf in the United States

- Abbreviation: USGA
- Formation: December 22, 1894, 131 years ago (as the Amateur Golf Association of the United States)
- Type: NGO
- Headquarters: Golf House, Liberty Corner, New Jersey, U.S.
- Region served: United States, Mexico
- Members: 700,000
- CEO: Mike Whan
- President: Kevin Hammer
- Affiliations: The R&A
- Staff: 300
- Volunteers: 1,200
- Website: usga.org

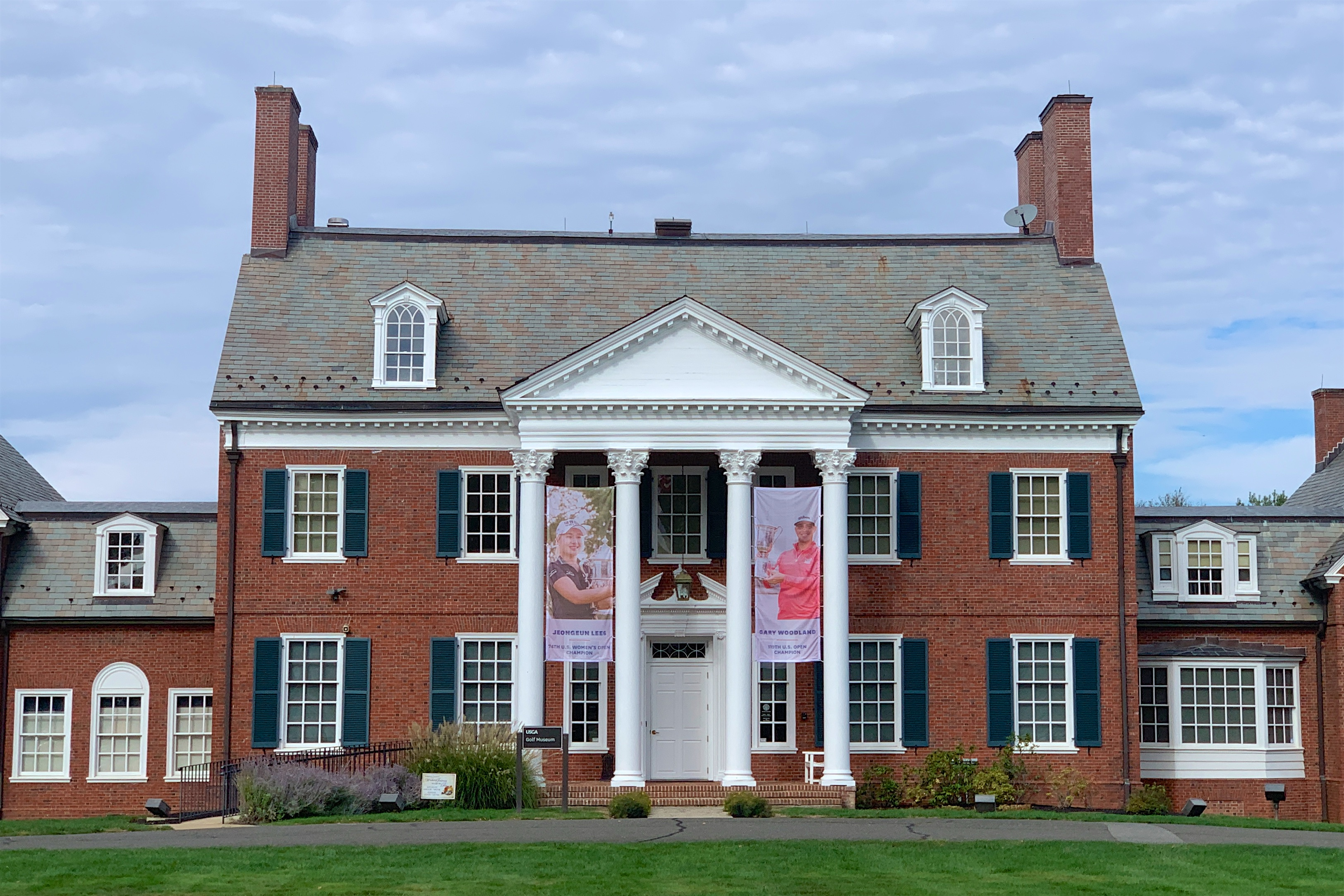
The USGA Museum in Liberty Corner, New Jersey

The United States Golf Association (USGA) is the United States national association of golf courses, clubs and facilities and the governing body of golf for the U.S. and Mexico. Together with The R&A, the USGA produces and interprets the rules of golf. The USGA also provides a national handicap system for golfers, conducts 14 national championships, including the U.S. Open, U.S. Women's Open and U.S. Senior Open, and tests golf equipment for conformity with regulations. The USGA and the USGA Museum are located in Liberty Corner, New Jersey. In 2024, the USGA moved its Testing Center from Liberty Corner, New Jersey to Pinehurst, North Carolina. The Testing Center is where all golf clubs and golf balls manufactured in the United States and Mexico are tested for conformance to the Rules of Golf.

== History ==
The USGA was originally formed in 1894 to resolve the question of a national amateur championship. Earlier that year, the Newport Country Club and Saint Andrew's Golf Club, Yonkers, New York, both declared the winners of their tournaments the "national amateur champion." That autumn, delegates from Newport, St. Andrew's, The Country Club, Chicago Golf Club, and Shinnecock Hills Golf Club met in New York City to form a national governing body, which would administer the championship and also the Rules of Golf for the country. On December 22, 1894, the Amateur Golf Association of the United States was officially formed, and was shortly thereafter renamed the "United States Golf Association". Theodore Havemeyer was the first president, and the U.S. Amateur trophy is named in his honor.

The first U.S. Amateur was held in 1895 at the Newport Country Club, with Charles B. Macdonald (who was runner-up at both of the previous year's tournaments) winning the championship. The first U.S. Open was held the following day. It was not until 1898 that the two events were held at separate clubs. Today, the USGA administers 14 separate national championships, ten of which are expressly for amateurs.

The USGA gradually expanded its membership from the original five clubs. There were 267 club members in 1910, and 1,138 clubs by 1932. Membership fell off during the Great Depression and World War II, but recovered by 1947. By 1980 there were over 5,000 clubs, and today membership exceeds 9,700.

On September 17, 1956, Ann Gregory began competing in the U.S. Women's Amateur Championship, thus becoming the first African-American woman to play in a national championship conducted by the USGA.

In 2011, Sarah Hirshland became the senior managing director of business affairs for the USGA. In April 2018, she was promoted to chief commercial officer. She brought the USGA partnerships with major corporations and negotiated a billion-dollar deal with the Fox TV network. In August 2018, she left to become the 20th chief executive officer of the United States Olympic Committee.

== Publications ==
The USGA publishes the Green Section Record, a digital journal covering turfgrass research, golf course maintenance, and environmental management. Its origins date to 1921, when the USGA began publishing The Bulletin of the Green Section. Following several changes of title, the Green Section Record was introduced in May 1963 and became exclusively digital in July 2010. Michigan State University maintains an online archive of the publications dating back to 1921.

== Competitions organized by the USGA ==
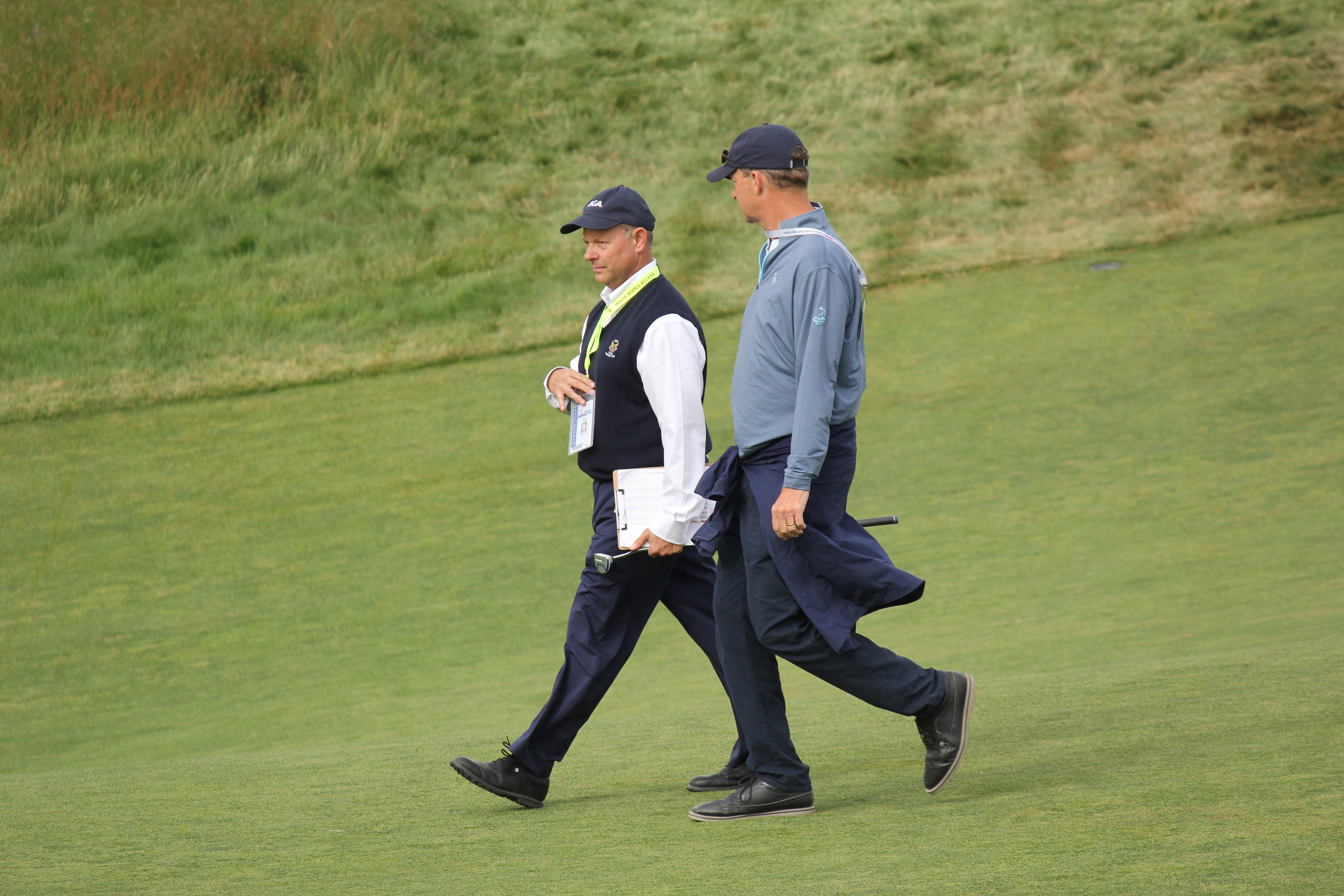
Mike Davis (on left), former executive director of the USGA, walking down the 18th fairway at the 2018 U.S. Open with Gil Hanse (on right).

The USGA organizes or co-organizes the following competitions:

=== Open championships ===
An "open" golf championship is one that both professionals and amateurs may enter. In practice, such events are always won by professionals nowadays. The two leading opens in the U.S. are:

- U.S. Open – no age or gender restrictions, Handicap Index requirement of 1.4 or less. Established in 1895, it is the second-oldest of the four major championships.
- U.S. Women's Open – females, no age restrictions, Handicap Index requirement of 2.4 or less. Established in 1946 and administered by the USGA since 1953, it is the oldest of the five women's majors.

The last win by an amateur at the U.S. Open was 93 years ago in 1933 and an amateur has won the women's event only once, 59 years ago in 1967.

The USGA also conducts the U.S. Senior Open for competitors 50 and over. This is one of the five majors recognized by the world's dominant tour for golfers 50 and over, PGA Tour Champions. The overwhelming majority of the competitors play regularly on this tour. Many of the remaining players compete on the European counterpart of PGA Tour Champions, the European Senior Tour, which recognizes the U.S. Senior Open as one of its three majors. The USGA added a women's counterpart in 2018.

- U.S. Senior Open – no gender restriction, players age 50 & older, handicap index requirement of 3.4 or less, established in 1980.
- U.S. Senior Women's Open – women's players age 50 & older with a handicap index of 7.4 or less, established in 2018.

Golfers with disabilities began playing at the U.S. Adaptive Open in 2022.

=== Individual amateur championships ===
Professional golf in the US is mainly run by the PGA Tour, the LPGA, and the PGA of America. However, the USGA organizes the 10 national amateur championships. The leading events are open to all age groups, but are usually won by golfers in their early twenties:

- U.S. Amateur – no age or gender restrictions, handicap index of 2.4 or less, established in 1895.
- U.S. Women's Amateur – no age restrictions, females with a handicap index of 5.4 or less, established in 1895.

There are two championships for players under age 19:

- U.S. Junior Amateur – no gender restriction, handicap index of 4.4 or less, established in 1948
- U.S. Girls' Junior – girls with a handicap index of 9.4 or less, established in 1949

And two for senior golfers:

- U.S. Senior Amateur – no gender restriction, players age 55 & older, handicap index of 7.4 or less, established in 1955
- U.S. Senior Women's Amateur – women age 50 & older with a handicap index of 18.4 or less, established in 1962

Because the U.S. Amateur and U.S. Women's Amateur became increasingly dominated by future tournament professionals, two national championships were added in the 1980s for "career amateurs" who were 25 years of age & older:

- U.S. Mid-Amateur – no gender restriction, players age 25 & older, handicap index of 3.4 or less, established in 1981
- U.S. Women's Mid-Amateur – women age 25 & older with a handicap index of 9.4 or less, established in 1987

=== Team amateur championships ===
These team events were announced by the USGA in 2013 as the replacements for the discontinued Public Links championships and played for the first time in 2015. Both are contested by two-member teams in four-ball matches. Partners are not required to be from the same club, political subdivision, or country.

- U.S. Amateur Four-Ball – no age or gender restrictions; handicap index of 5.4 or less
- U.S. Women's Amateur Four-Ball – no age restrictions, females with a handicap index of 14.4 or less

=== State team championships ===
The USGA men's and women's state team championships were first conducted in 1995 as a part of the USGA's Centennial celebration. The two championships were conducted biennially in odd-numbered years through 2009. Since 2010, the men's championship has been conducted in even-numbered years and the women's championship in odd-numbered years. According to NCAA rules, college golfers are not eligible.

- USGA Men's State Team Championship
- USGA Women's State Team Championship

=== International team competitions ===
The USGA, in cooperation with The R&A, co-organizes two biennial amateur team competitions between the United States and a joint team representing Great Britain and Ireland (in political terms, Ireland and the United Kingdom).

- Curtis Cup – 8-woman teams, played in even-numbered years. The 2018 edition was the first in which The R&A was directly involved. Previously, the Ladies' Golf Union was the co-organizer, but that body merged with The R&A in late 2016 (after that year's Curtis Cup had been played).
- Walker Cup – 10-man male teams, played in odd-numbered years.

Through its membership of the International Golf Federation the USGA is involved in the administration of the two "World Amateur Team Championships", which are played biennially in even-numbered years.

- Eisenhower Trophy – for men
- Espirito Santo Trophy – for women

=== Discontinued championships ===
There had been two events for "public-course" golfers, but the USGA announced in 2013 that both would be discontinued after their 2014 editions. Members of private golf clubs were excluded from these championships.

- U.S. Amateur Public Links – popularly known as the "Publinx"; no gender restriction, handicap index of 4.4 or less, established in 1922 and discontinued in 2014
- U.S. Women's Amateur Public Links – popularly known as the "Women's Publinx"; women with a handicap index of 18.4 or less, established in 1977 and discontinued in 2014

=== Multiple event winners ===
Only nine golfers have won more than one USGA individual event in the same year:

- Chick Evans won the U.S. Open and U.S. Amateur in 1916. He went on to win the U.S. Amateur in 1920.
- Bobby Jones won the U.S. Open and U.S. Amateur as half of his historic Grand Slam in 1930. Jones had previously won three U.S. Opens (1923, 1926, 1929) and four U.S. Amateurs (1924, 1925, 1927, 1928).
- Jay Sigel won the U.S. Amateur and U.S. Mid-Amateur in 1983. He had won the U.S. Amateur in 1982 and would win the Mid-Am in 1985 and 1987.
- Pearl Sinn won the Women's Public Links and Women's Amateur in 1988. She successfully defended her Women's Publinx title in 1989.
- Ryan Moore won the U.S. Public Links and U.S. Amateur in 2004. He had previously won the Publinx in 2002.
- Colt Knost won the U.S. Public Links and U.S. Amateur in 2007.
- Jennifer Song won the Women's Public Links and Women's Amateur in 2009.
- Seong Eun-jeong won the Girls' Junior and Women's Amateur in 2016. She had previously won the Girls' Junior in 2015.
- Rianne Malixi won the Girls' Junior and Women's Amateur in 2024.

Six people have won three different USGA individual events in their careers:

- JoAnne Carner (née Gunderson) – Girls' Jr – 1956; Women's Am – 1957, 1960, 1962, 1966, 1968; Women's Open – 1971, 1976
- Arnold Palmer – Amat – 1954; Open – 1960; Sr Open – 1981
- Jack Nicklaus – Amat – 1959, 1961; Open – 1962, 1967, 1972, 1980; Sr Open – 1991, 1993
- Carol Semple Thompson – Women's Am – 1973; Women's Mid-Am – 1990, 1997; Sr Women's Am – 1999, 2000, 2001, 2002
- Tiger Woods – Jr Amat – 1991, 1992, 1993; Amat – 1994, 1995, 1996; Open – 2000, 2002, 2008
- Jill McGill – Women's Am – 1993; Women's Publinx – 1994; Sr Women's Open – 2022

Fifty–five other people have won two different USGA individual events in their careers, and four have won a USGA individual and team events:

- Francis Ouimet – Open – 1913; Amat – 1914, 1931
- Jerome Travers – Amat – 1907, 1908, 1912, 1913; Open – 1915
- Johnny Goodman – Open – 1933; Amat – 1937
- Lawson Little – Amat – 1934, 1935; Open – 1940
- Patty Berg – Women's Am – 1938; Women's Open – 1946
- Betty Jameson – Women's Am – 1939, 1940; Women's Open – 1947
- Babe Zaharias – Women's Am – 1946; Women's Open – 1948, 1950, 1954
- Louise Suggs – Women's Am – 1947; Women's Open – 1949, 1952
- Pat Lesser Harbottle – Girls' Jr – 1950; Women's Am – 1955
- Mickey Wright – Girls' Jr – 1952; Women's Open – 1958, 1959, 1961, 1964
- Gene Littler – Amat – 1953; Open – 1961
- Catherine Lacoste – Women's Open – 1967; Women's Am – 1969
- Gene Andrews – Publinx – 1954; Sr Amat – 1970
- Johnny Miller – Jr Amat – 1964; Open – 1973
- Jerry Pate – Amat – 1974; Open – 1976
- Dorothy Germain Porter – Women's Am – 1949; Sr Women's Am – 1977, 1980, 1981, 1983
- Hollis Stacy – Girls' Jr – 1969, 1970, 1971; Women's Open – 1977, 1978, 1984
- William C. Campbell – Amat – 1964; Sr Amat – 1979, 1980
- Lori Castillo – Girls' Jr – 1978; Women's Publinx – 1979, 1980
- Amy Alcott – Girls' Jr – 1973; Women's Open – 1980
- Billy Casper – Open – 1959, 1966; Sr Open – 1983
- Heather Farr – Girls' Jr – 1982; Women's Publinx – 1984
- Marlene Streit (née Stewart) – Women's Am – 1956; Sr Women's Am – 1985, 1994, 2003
- Billy Mayfair – Publinx – 1986; Amat – 1987
- Gary Player – Open – 1965; Sr Open – 1987, 1988
- Anne Quast (aka Decker, Welts, Sander) – Women's Am – 1958, 1961, 1963; Women's Mid-Am – 1987, 1989, 1990, 1993
- Orville Moody – Open – 1969; Sr Open – 1989
- Pat Hurst – Girls' Jr – 1986; Women's Am – 1990
- Lee Trevino – Open – 1968, 1971; Sr Open – 1990
- Amy Fruhwirth – Women's Am – 1991; Women's Publinx – 1992
- Kelli Kuehne – Girls' Jr – 1994; Women's Am – 1995, 1996
- Dorothy Delasin – Girls' Jr – 1996; Women's Am – 1998
- Hale Irwin – Open – 1974, 1979, 1990; Sr Open – 1998, 2000
- Juli Inkster – Women's Am – 1980, 1981, 1982; Women's Open – 1999, 2002
- Bruce Fleisher – Amat – 1968; Sr Open – 2001
- Inbee Park – Girls' Jr – 2002; Women's Open – 2008, 2013
- Vinny Giles – Amat – 1972; Sr Amat – 2009
- Ellen Port – Women's Mid-Am – 1995, 1996, 2000, 2011; Sr. Women's Am – 2012, 2013, 2016
- Michelle Wie – Women's Publinx – 2003; Women's Open – 2014
- Joan Higgins – Women's Mid-Am – 2008; Sr. Women's Am – 2014
- Nathan Smith – Mid-Am – 2003, 2009, 2010, 2012; Four-Ball – 2015
- Jordan Spieth – Jr Amat – 2009, 2011; Open – 2015
- Ariya Jutanugarn – Girls' Jr – 2011; Women's Open – 2018
- Laura Davies – Women's Open – 1987; Sr. Women's Open – 2018
- Scott Harvey – Mid-Am – 2014; Four-Ball – 2019
- Bryson DeChambeau – Amat – 2015; Open – 2020, 2024
- Jim Furyk – Open – 2003; Sr Open – 2021
- Rose Zhang – Women's Am – 2020; Girls' Jr – 2021
- Annika Sörenstam – Women's Open – 1995, 1996, 2006; Sr. Women's Open – 2021
- Minjee Lee – Girls' Jr – 2012; Women's Open – 2022
- Matt Fitzpatrick – Amat – 2013; Open – 2022
- Nick Dunlap – Jr Amat – 2021; Amat – 2023
- Todd White – Four-Ball – 2015; Sr Amat – 2023
- Mike McCoy – Mid-Am – 2013; Sr Amat – 2025
- Asterisk Talley – Women's Four-Ball – 2024, Women's Am – 2026

Note: Multiple winners of individual events can be found in that event's article.

=== Most career USGA championships won ===
- Bobby Jones: 9 – Open - 1923, 1926, 1929, 1930; Amat - 1924, 1925, 1927, 1928, 1930
- Tiger Woods: 9 – Jr Amat - 1991, 1992, 1993; Amat - 1994, 1995, 1996; Open - 2000, 2002, 2008
- JoAnne Carner: 8 – Girls' Jr - 1956; Women's Am - 1957, 1960, 1962, 1966, 1968; Women's Op - 1971, 1976
- Jack Nicklaus: 8 – Amat - 1959, 1961; Open - 1962, 1967, 1972, 1980; Sr Open - 1991, 1993
- Anne Quast (aka Decker, Welts, Sander): 7 – Women's Am - 1958, 1961, 1963; Sr Women's Am - 1987, 1990, 1992, 1993
- Ellen Port: 7 – Women's Mid-Am - 1995, 1996, 2000, 2011; Sr. Women's Am - 2012, 2013, 2016
- Carol Semple Thompson: 7 – Women's Am - 1973; Women's Mid-Am - 1990, 1997; Sr Women's Am - 1999, 2000, 2001, 2002
- Glenna Collett (Vare): 6 – Women's Am - 1922, 1925, 1928, 1929, 1930, 1935
- Hollis Stacy: 6 – Girls' Jr - 1969, 1970, 1971; Women's Open - 1977, 1978, 1984
- Jerome Travers: 5 – Amat - 1907, 1908, 1912, 1913; Open - 1915
- Mickey Wright: 5 – Girls' Jr - 1952; Women's Op - 1958, 1959, 1961, 1964
- Carolyn Cudone: 5 – Sr Women's Am - 1968-1972
- Dorothy Germain Porter: 5 – Women's Am - 1949; Sr. Women's Am - 1977, 1980, 1981, 1983
- Jay Sigel: 5 – Amat - 1982, 1983; Mid-Am - 1983, 1985, 1987
- Hale Irwin: 5 – Open - 1974, 1979, 1990; Sr Open 1998, 2000
- Juli Inkster: 5 – Women's Am - 1980, 1981, 1982; Women's Open - 1999, 2002
- Nathan Smith: 5 – Mid-Am – 2003, 2009, 2010, 2012; Four-Ball – 2015

=== Virtual USGA Championship ===
The USGA partnered with World Golf Tour in 2009 to co-host the first annual Virtual USGA Championship online. The Virtual U.S. Open attracted hundreds of thousands of players from more than 180 countries. The first-place winner took home a replica of the U.S. Open trophy and won a trip for two to Pebble Beach for the next year's event.

== See also ==
- American Junior Golf Association
- George Herbert Walker – past president and namesake of the Walker Cup
- Golf in the United States
- United States Golf Association Museum and Arnold Palmer Center for Golf History
