= U.S. Women's Mid-Amateur =

American golf tournament

The U.S. Women's Mid-Amateur is one of thirteen United States Golf Association national championships. First played in 1987, it provides amateur women over the age of 25 an opportunity to compete for a national championship. Entrants must have a handicap index of 9.4 or lower.

== History ==
The major amateur tournament in the U.S. for women, the U.S. Women's Amateur, is dominated by women under age 25, many with hopes of becoming tournament professionals.

The winner wins an invitation to the U.S. Women's Open, and if she will turn 50 by the time of the ensuing U.S. Senior Women's Open, she is automatically eligible for that tournament.

== Winners ==
Year	Winner	Score	Runner-up	Course	Location
2026	Ivy Shepherd	5 & 4	Catherine McEvoy	Montclair Golf Club	West Orange, New Jersey
2025	Ina Kim-Schaad (2)	23 holes	Hanley Long	Monterey Peninsula Country Club, Dunes Course	Pebble Beach, California
2024	Hana Ryskova	5 & 4	Lindsay Gahm	Brae Burn Country Club	West Newton, Massachusetts
2023	Kimberly Dinh	2 up	Kelsey Chugg	Stonewall, North Course	Elverson, Pennsylvania
2022	Krissy Carman	2 & 1	Aliea Clark	Fiddlesticks Country Club, Long Mean Course	Fort Myers, Florida
2021	Blakesley Brock	5 & 4	Aliea Clark	Berkeley Hall Club, North Course	Bluffton, South Carolina
2020	Canceled due to the COVID-19 pandemic			Berkeley Hall Club	Bluffton, South Carolina
2019	Ina Kim-Schaad	3 & 2	Talia Campbell	Forest Highlands Golf Club, Meadows Course	Flagstaff, Arizona
2018	Shannon Johnson	1 up	Kelsey Chugg	Norwood Hills Country Club	St. Louis, Missouri
2017^	Kelsey Chugg	3 & 1	Mary Jane Hiestand	Champions Golf Club, Cypress Creek Course	Houston, Texas
2016	Julia Potter (2)	2 & 1	Shannon Johnson	The Kahkwa Club	Erie, Pennsylvania
2015	Lauren Greenlief	2 & 1	Margaret Shirley	Squire Creek Country Club	Choudrant, Louisiana
2014	Margaret Shirley	5 & 3	Julia Potter	Harbour Trees Golf Club	Noblesville, Indiana
2013	Julia Potter	19 holes	Margaret Shirley	Biltmore Forest Country Club	Asheville, North Carolina
2012	Meghan Bolger Stasi (4)	6 & 5	Liz Waynick	Briggs Ranch Golf Club	San Antonio, Texas
2011	Ellen Port (4)	2 & 1	Martha Leach	Bayville Golf Club	Virginia Beach, Virginia
2010	Meghan Bolger Stasi (3)	2 up	Carol Robertson	Wichita Country Club	Wichita, Kansas
2009	Martha Leach	3 & 2	Laura Cable	Golden Hills Golf and Turf Club	Ocala, Florida
2008	Joan Higgins	1 up	Lynn Simmons	Barton Hills Country Club	Ann Arbor, Michigan
2007	Meghan Bolger (2)	1 up	Kerry Postillion	Desert Forest Golf Club	Carefree, Arizona
2006	Meghan Bolger	5 & 4	Thuhashini Selvaratnam	Old Waverly Golf Club	West Point, Mississippi
2005	Mary Ann Lapointe	1 up	Kerry Postillion	Shadow Hawk Golf Club	Richmond, Texas
2004	Corey Weworski	5 & 4	Virginia Grimes	Holston Hills Country Club	Knoxville, Tennessee
2003	Amber Marsh	3 & 2	Shannon Ogg	Long Cove Club	Hilton Head, South Carolina
2002	Kathy Hartwiger	2 up	Ellen Port	Eugene Country Club	Eugene, Oregon
2001	Laura Shanahan	4 & 3	Mina Hardin	Fox Run Golf Club	Eureka, Missouri
2000	Ellen Port (3)	3 & 2	Anna Schultz	Big Canyon Country Club	Newport Beach, California
1999	Alissa Herron	1 up	Leland Beckel	Cherokee Town & Country Club	Atlanta, Georgia
1998	Virginia Derby Grimes	4 & 3	Robin Weiss	Champions Golf Club, Cypress Creek Course	Houston, Texas
1997	Carol Semple Thompson (2)	2 & 1	Leslie Shannon	Atlantic City Country Club	Northfield, New Jersey
1996	Ellen Port (2)	2 & 1	Kerry Postillion	Mission Hills Country Club, Dinah Shore Course	Rancho Mirage, California
1995	Ellen Port	3 & 1	Brenda Corrie-Kuehn	Essex County Club	Manchester-by-the-Sea, Massachusetts
1994	Sarah LeBrun Ingram (3)	2 & 1	Marla Jemsek	Tacoma Golf & Country Club	Tacoma, Washington
1993	Sarah LeBrun Ingram (2)	2 & 1	Mary Burkhardt	Rochester Golf & Country Club	Rochester, Minnesota
1992	Marion Maney-McInerney	19 holes	Carol Semple Thompson	Old Marsh Golf Club	Palm Beach Gardens, Florida
1991	Sarah LeBrun Ingram	6 & 5	Martha Lang	Desert Highlands Golf Club	Scottsdale, Arizona
1990	Carol Semple Thompson	3 & 1	Page Marsh Lea	Allegheny Country Club	Sewickley, Pennsylvania
1989	Robin Weiss	22 holes	Page Marsh Lea	The Hills of Lakeway Golf Club	Lakeway, Texas
1988	Martha Lang	4 & 3	Mary Hanyak	Amelia Island Plantation	Amelia Island, Florida
1987	Cindy Scholefield	6 & 5	Pat Cornett-Iker	Southern Hills Country Club	Tulsa, Oklahoma

^ Originally scheduled for Quail Creek Country Club in Naples, Florida but moved due to course damage caused by Hurricane Irma.

== Future sites ==
Year	Course	Location	Dates
2027	Country Club of Buffalo	Williamsville, New York	September 11–16
2028	Charlotte Country Club	Charlotte, North Carolina	September 23–28
2029	Country Club of York	York, Pennsylvania	September 22–27
2030	Sand Valley Resort	Nekoosa, Wisconsin	September 7–12
2032	Jupiter Hills Club	Tequesta, Florida	September 18–23
2033	Exmoor Country Club	Highland Park, Illinois	TBD
2034	The Golf Club of Tennessee	Kingston Springs, Tennessee	TBD
2035	Waverley Country Club	Portland, Oregon	TBD
2036	Sankaty Head Golf Club	Siasconset, Massachusetts	TBD
2037	Lancaster Country Club	Lancaster, Pennsylvania	TBD
