= Edea =

Edea may refer to:

- Edea (band), a Finnish musical group or their 1998 eponymous album
- Edéa, a city in the Littoral Province of Cameroon
- Edea Kramer, a character in the video game Final Fantasy VIII
