= Carol Semple =

American golfer

Personal information
- Full name: Carol Semple Thompson
- Nationality: United States
- Born: October 27, 1948 (age 78) Sewickley, Pennsylvania, U.S.

Career
- Sport: Golf
- College: Hollins University
- Status: Amateur

Best results in LPGA major championships
- Titleholders C'ship: DNP
- Chevron Championship: T51: 1989
- Women's PGA C'ship: DNP
- U.S. Women's Open: T9: 1972
- du Maurier Classic: DNP
- Women's British Open: DNP

Achievements and awards
- World Golf Hall of Fame: 2008 (member page)
- Bob Jones Award: 2003

Carol Semple (born October 27, 1948), also known by her married name Carol Semple Thompson, is an American golfer who participated only on the amateur circuit, and never turned pro.

== Early life ==
Semple was born in Sewickley, Pennsylvania. She is from a prominent golfing family; her father served as president of the United States Golf Association (USGA) in 1974 and 1975. Her mother played competitive golf and served on various USGA committees for many years.

At age 16, Carol Semple won her first tournament by defeating her mother in the finals of the Western Pennsylvania Women's Championship. She is a 1966 graduate of Miss Porter's School.

== Career ==
She is a 1970 graduate of Hollins University in Roanoke, Virginia, she defeated Anne Quast to win the 1973 U.S. Women's Amateur at the Montclair Golf Club in Montclair, New Jersey. Semple won the 1974 British Ladies Amateur. At present, she is one of only eleven golfers to hold both titles. In defense of her U.S. championship, she made it to the 1974 finals but lost to Cynthia Hill.

Among her other significant victories in amateur play, she won the 1976 and 1987 North and South Women's Amateur, two U.S. Women's Mid-Amateurs, and won the U.S. Senior Women's Amateur four years in a row from 1999 to 2002. She also was part of the American team that won four Espirito Santo Trophys at the World Amateur Golf Team Championships. She is also one of only six people to have won three different USGA individual championship events, the others being JoAnne Carner, Jill McGill, Jack Nicklaus, Arnold Palmer and Tiger Woods.

She has been on more Curtis Cup teams and scored more victories than any competitor in the history of the Curtis Cup. At age 53, she clinched the U.S. team's 2002 victory with a dramatic 27-foot birdie putt on the final hole.

== Awards and honors ==
- Semple Thompson was voted the 2003 Bob Jones Award, the highest honor given by the United States Golf Association in recognition of distinguished sportsmanship in golf.
- In 2005, she was named recipient of the PGA "First Lady of Golf Award."
- In 2008, she was elected to the World Golf Hall of Fame in the Lifetime Achievement category.
- In 2018 she was the inaugural inductee of the Miss Porter's School Athletic Hall of Fame.

== Amateur wins ==
this is may be incomplete

- 1973 U.S. Women's Amateur
- 1974 British Ladies Amateur
- 1976 North and South Women's Amateur
- 1985 Mexico International Amateur Championship
- 1986 Mexico International Amateur Championship
- 1987 North and South Women's Amateur, Mexico International Amateur Championship
- 1990 U.S. Women's Mid-Amateur
- 1997 U.S. Women's Mid-Amateur
- 1999 U.S. Senior Women's Amateur
- 2000 U.S. Senior Women's Amateur
- 2001 U.S. Senior Women's Amateur
- 2002 U.S. Senior Women's Amateur

== U.S. national team appearances ==
- Curtis Cup: 1974 (winners), 1976 (winners), 1980 (winners), 1982 (winners), 1988, 1990 (winners), 1992, 1994 (tie), 1996, 1998 (winners), 2000 (winners), 2002 (winners), 2006 (non-playing captain, winners), 2008 (non-playing captain, winners)
- Espirito Santo Trophy: 1974 (winners), 1980 (winners), 1988 (winners), 1992, 1994 (winners)
