= Edean Anderson Ihlanfeldt =

American golfer (1930–2020)

Personal information
- Born: April 15, 1930; Helena, Montana, U.S.
- Died: April 27, 2020 (aged 90); Wenatchee, Washington, U.S.
- Education: Oregon State University
- Occupation(s): Amateur golfer, college golf coach
- Spouse: Robert Ihlanfeldt

Sport
- Sport: Golf

Edean Anderson Ihlanfeldt, pronounced island-felt, (April 15, 1930 – April 27, 2020) was an American amateur golfer from Montana, coach and founder of the University of Washington women's varsity golf team, and one of the most successful female golfers in the Pacific Northwest. She won several amateur tournaments, including the Canadian Women's Amateur and the U.S. Senior Women's Amateur.

== Early life and education ==
Anderson began training at age 13; in 1944, at age 14, she won her first out of six consecutive Montana State Women's Amateur golf championships (1944–49), with a local outlet calling her a child prodigy. In 1949, Anderson moved to Corvallis, Oregon to attend Oregon State University, where she joined the sorority Alpha Phi. While there, she practiced with friend and fellow golfer Grace DeMoss, competing as both partners and opponents at times. Anderson would continue a streak of winning one major championship a year until 1954. That year Anderson met her husband Robert Ihlanfeldt while playing golf. He proposed a week later, and the two were married in two months.

== Career ==
During the first two decades of her career after graduation, Ihlanfeldt won numerous tournaments: "five Pacific Northwest titles, the Washington state crown four times, the Trans-Mississippi championship, and the 1952 Canadian Open crown."

In 1974, Ihlanfeldt brought the U.S. Women's Amateur to Seattle and founded the women's varsity golf program at the University of Washington; she accepted no salary during the time she coached the team for the next eight years. In 1989, the University inducted her into its Hall of Fame.

In 1997 Ihlanfeldt, once again, brought the U.S. Senior Women's Amateur to Seattle.

Ihlanfeldt died April 27, 2020.

== Amateur wins ==
- 1944 Montana State Women's Amateur
- 1945 Montana State Women's Amateur
- 1946 Montana State Women's Amateur
- 1947 Montana State Women's Amateur
- 1948 Montana State Women's Amateur
- 1949 Montana State Women's Amateur, Pacific Northwest Women's Amateur
- 1951 Pacific Northwest Women's Amateur
- 1952 Canadian Women's Amateur
- 1953 Women's Trans-Mississippi Amateur
- 1961 Washington State Women's Amateur
- 1962 Pacific Northwest Women's Amateur, Washington State Women's Amateur
- 1963 Pacific Northwest Women's Amateur, Washington State Women's Amateur
- 1964 Pacific Northwest Women's Amateur
- 1975 Washington State Women's Amateur
- 1982 U.S. Senior Women's Amateur
- 1986 Pacific Northwest Senior Women's Amateur
- 1987 Pacific Northwest Senior Women's Amateur
- 1988 Pacific Northwest Senior Women's Amateur
