= U.S. Senior Women's Amateur =

Female golf tournament

The U.S. Senior Women's Amateur was launched in 1962 as an annual tournament for female amateur golfing competitors at least 50 years of age. The format began as a 54-hole stroke play competition over three days until 1997 when it was changed to a match play event. Sectional qualifying was first implemented for the 2000 championship.

The U.S. Senior Women's Amateur operates through the auspices of the United States Golf Association.

In 1977 Dorothy Germain Porter became the first U.S. Women's Amateur champion to win the Seniors' title.

Starting in 2018, the reigning champion and runner-up, and the preceding year's champion, will be eligible to participate in the U.S. Senior Women's Open.

== Winners ==
=== Match play era winners ===
Year	Venue	Winner	Score	Runner-up
2026	Portland Golf Club (OR)	Xiaolong Zhong	1 up	Amandine Vincent
2025	The Homestead (Cascades Course) (VA)	Dawn Woodard	20 holes	Sue Wooster
2024	Broadmoor Golf Club (WA)	Nadene Gole	3 & 2	Shelly Stouffer
2023	Troon Country Club (AZ)	Sarah Gallagher	1 up	Brenda Corrie Kuehn
2022	Anchorage Golf Course (AK)	Shelly Stouffer	4 & 3	Sue Wooster
2021	The Lakewood Club (Dogwood Course) (AL)	Lara Tennant	2 & 1	Ellen Port
2020	Canceled due to the COVID-19 pandemic			
2019	Cedar Rapids Country Club (IA)	Lara Tennant	3 & 2	Sue Wooster
2018	Orchid Island Golf & Beach Club (FL)	Lara Tennant	3 & 2	Sue Wooster
2017	Waverley Country Club (OR)	Judith Kyrinis	4 & 3	Terrill Samuel
2016	Wellesley Country Club (MA)	Ellen Port	3 & 2	Andrea Kraus
2015	Hillwood Country Club (TN)	Karen Garcia	1 up	Pamela Kuong
2014	Hollywood Golf Club (NJ)	Joan Higgins	1 up	Judith Kyrinis
2013	CordeValle Golf Club (CA)	Ellen Port	3 & 2	Susan Cohn
2012	Hershey Country Club (West Course) (PA)	Ellen Port	4 & 3	Jane Fitzgerald
2011	The Honors Course (TN)	Terri Frohnmayer	2 & 1	Mina Hardin
2010	Fiddlesticks Country Club (FL)	Mina Hardin	2 & 1	Alexandria Frazier
2009	The Homestead (Cascades Course) (VA)	Sherry Herman	4 & 3	Carolyn Creekmore
2008	Tulsa Country Club (OK)	Diane Lang	6 & 5	Toni Weisner
2007	Sunriver Resort (Meadows Course) (OR)	Anna Schultz	20 holes	Robyn Puckett
2006	Sea Island Golf Club (Seaside Course) (GA)	Diane Lang	1 up	Ana Schultz
2005	The Apawamis Club (NY)	Diane Lang	1 up	Carol Semple Thompson
2004	Pasatiempo Golf Club (CA)	Carolyn Creekmore	1 up	Liz Haines
2003	Barton Creek Resort and Club (Foothills Course) (TX)	Marlene Streit	23 holes	Nancy Fitzgerald
2002	Mid Pines Inn and Golf Club (NC)	Carol Semple Thompson	3 & 1	Barbara Berkmeyer
2001	Allegheny Country Club (PA)	Carol Semple Thompson	1 up	Anne Carr
2000	Sea Island Golf Club (Seaside Course) (GA)	Carol Semple Thompson	5 & 4	Toni Weisner
1999	Desert Mountain Club (Cochise Course) (AZ)	Carol Semple Thompson	19 holes	Cecilia Mourgue-D'Algue
1998	Golden Horseshoe Golf Club (Green Course) (VA)	Gayle Borthwick	4 & 3	Valerie Hassett
1997	Yeamans Hall Club (SC)	Nancy Fitzgerald	1 up	Toni Weisner

=== Stroke play era winners ===
Year	Venue	Winner	Score	Margin of Victory	Runner(s)-up
1996	Broadmoor Golf Club (WA)	Gayle Borthwick	226	1 stroke	Marlene Streit
1995	Somerset Country Club (MN)	Jean Smith	228	1 stroke	Marlene Streit
1994	Sea Island Golf Club (GA)	Marlene Streit	222	Playoff	Nancy Fitzgerald
1993	Preakness Hills Country Club (NJ)	Anne Quast Sander	230	4 strokes	Mary Ann Morrison
1992	Tucson Country Club (AZ)	Rosemary Thompson	220	3 strokes	Anne Quast Sander
1991	Pine Needles Lodge and Golf Club (NC)	Phyllis Preuss	221	1 stroke	Belle Robertson; Anne Quast Sander
1990	Del Rio Golf and Country Club (CA)	Anne Quast Sander	225	Playoff	Marlene Streit
1989	TPC at The Woodlands (TX)	Anne Quast Sander	224	9 strokes	Alice Dye
1988	Sea Island Golf Club (GA)	Lois Hodge	228	1 stroke	Marlene Streit
1987	Manufacturers’ Golf and Country Club (PA)	Anne Quast Sander	228	3 strokes	Harriet Hart
1986	The Lakewood Club (Dogwood Course) (AL)	Constance Guthrie	225	6 strokes	Marlene Streit; Barbara Young; Cecile Maclaurin
1985	Sheraton Savannah Resort and Country Club (GA)	Marlene Streit	224	3 strokes	Louise Wilson
1984	Tacoma Country and Golf Club (WA)	Constance Guthrie	227	2 strokes	Janice Calin
1983	Gulph Mills Golf Club (PA)	Dorothy Germain Porter	234	8 strokes	Lois Hodge
1982	Kissing Camels Golf Club (CO)	Edean Ihlanfeldt	232	2 strokes	Mary Ann Morrison
1981	Spring Lake Golf Club (NJ)	Dorothy Germain Porter	238	4 strokes	Alice Dye
1980	Sea Island Golf Club (GA)	Dorothy Germain Porter	236	1 stroke	Cecile Maclaurin
1979	Hardscrabble Country Club (AR)	Alice Dye	223	7 strokes	Cecile Maclaurin
1978	Rancho Bernardo Golf Club (CA)	Alice Dye	232	Playoff	Cecile Maclaurin
1977	Dunes Golf and Beach Club (SC)	Dorothy Germain Porter	230	1 stroke	Alice Dye
1976	Monterey Peninsula Country Club (Dunes Course) (CA)	Cecile Maclaurin	230	7 strokes	Carol Bowman
1975	Rhode Island Country Club (RI)	Alberta Bower	234	6 strokes	Carolyn Cudone
1974	The Lakewood Club (Dogwood Course) (AL)	Justine B. Cushing	231	2 strokes	Carolyn Cudone
1973	San Marcos Country Club (AZ)	Gwen Hibbs	229	6 strokes	Nancy Rutter
1972	Manufacturers’ Golf and Country Club (PA)	Carolyn Cudone	231	6 strokes	Nancy Rutter
1971	Sea Island Golf Club (GA)	Carolyn Cudone	236	1 stroke	Ann Gregory
1970	Coral Ridge Country Club (FL)	Carolyn Cudone	231	8 strokes	Paulette Lee
1969	Ridglea Country Club (TX)	Carolyn Cudone	236	Playoff	Mrs. Lowell D. Brown
1968	Monterey Peninsula Country Club (Dunes Course) (CA)	Carolyn Cudone	236	10 strokes	Loma Smith
1967	Atlantic City Country Club (NJ)	Marge Mason	236	4 strokes	Loma Smith
1966	Lakewood Country Club (LA)	Maureen Orcutt	242	6 strokes	Aneila Goldthwaite
1965	Exmoor Country Club (IL)	Loma Smith	242	3 strokes	Charlotte Haskell
1964	Del Paso Country Club (CA)	Loma Smith	247	1 stroke	Mrs. William Kirkland
1963	Country Club of Florida (FL)	Marion Choate	239	Playoff	Maureen Orcutt
1962	Manufacturers’ Golf and Country Club (PA)	Maureen Orcutt	240	7 strokes	Glenna Collett Vare

== Multiple winners ==
- 5 wins: Carolyn Cudone
- 4 wins: Dorothy Germain Porter, Anne Quast, Carol Semple Thompson
- 3 wins: Marlene Streit, Diane Lang, Ellen Port, Lara Tennant
- 2 wins: Loma Smith, Maureen Orcutt, Alice Dye, Constance Guthrie, Gayle Borthwick

== Future sites ==
Year	Edition	Course	Location	Dates
2027	65th	Columbia Country Club	Chevy Chase, Maryland	September 25–30
2028	66th	The Lakewood Club	Point Clear, Alabama	September 9–14
2030	68th	Ekwanok Country Club	Manchester, Vermont	TBD
2031	69th	Charles River Club	Newton Centre, Massachusetts	September 6–11
2033	71st	St. Clair Country Club	Pittsburgh, Pennsylvania	TBS
