= 1972 LPGA Tour =

Golf tour season

1972 LPGA Tour season
- Duration: January 7, 1972 – November 5, 1972
- Number of official events: 29
- Most wins: 5 (United States) Kathy Whitworth
- Money leader: (United States) Kathy Whitworth
- Player of the Year: (United States) Kathy Whitworth
- Vare Trophy: (United States) Kathy Whitworth
- Rookie of the Year: (Canada) Jocelyne Bourassa

The 1972 LPGA Tour was the 23rd season since the LPGA Tour officially began in 1950. The season ran from January 7 to November 5. The season consisted of 29 official money events. Kathy Whitworth won the most tournaments, five. Whitworth led the money list with earnings of $65,063.

The season saw the first tournament with a $100,000 purse, the Dinah Shore Colgate Winner's Circle ($110,000). It also saw the first player to win over $50,000 in a season, Whitworth. There were two first-time winners in 1972: Betty Burfeindt and Betsy Cullen. This season saw the return, for 1972 only, of the LPGA major, the Titleholders Championship. It also saw the last of Betsy Rawls' 55 LPGA wins.

The tournament results and award winners are listed below.

== Tournament results ==
The following table shows all the official money events for the 1972 season. "Date" is the ending date of the tournament. The numbers in parentheses after the winners' names are the number of wins they had on the tour up to and including that event. Majors are shown in bold.

Date	Tournament	Location	Winner	Score	Purse ($)	1st prize ($)
Jan 9	Burdine's Invitational	Florida	(United States) Marlene Hagge (26)	211 (−5)	30,000	4,500
Mar 12	Lady Eve Open	Texas	(United States) Judy Rankin (6)	210 (−6)	25,000	3,750
Mar 19	Orange Blossom Classic	Florida	(United States) Carol Mann (30)	213 (−3)	20,000	3,000
Mar 26	Sears Women's World Classic	Florida	(United States) Betsy Cullen (1)	72 (−1)	85,000	12,000
Apr 16	Dinah Shore Colgate Winner's Circle	California	(United States) Jane Blalock (4)	213 (−3)	110,000	20,050
Apr 23	Birmingham Centennial Classic	Alabama	(United States) Betty Burfeindt (1)	212 (−4)	30,000	4,500
Apr 30	Alamo Ladies Open	Texas	(United States) Kathy Whitworth (60)	209 (−10)	25,000	3,750
May 7	Sealy LPGA Classic	Nevada	(United States) Betty Burfeindt (2)	282 (−6)	50,000	10,000
May 16	Suzuki Golf Internationale	California	(United States) Jane Blalock (5)	208 (−8)	38,000	5,700
May 21	Bluegrass Invitational	Kentucky	(United States) Kathy Cornelius (5)	211 (−5)	25,000	3,750
May 29	**Titleholders Championship**	North Carolina	(United States) **Sandra Palmer** (3)	283 (−1)	20,000	3,000
Jun 4	Lady Carling Open	Maryland	(United States) Carol Mann (31)	210 (−9)	30,000	4,500
Jun 11	**Eve-LPGA Championship**	Massachusetts	(United States) **Kathy Ahern** (2)	293 (+1)	50,000	7,500
Jul 2	**U.S. Women's Open**	New York	(United States) **Susie Berning** (8)	299 (+11)	40,000	6,000
Jul 9	George Washington Classic	Pennsylvania	(United States) Kathy Ahern (3)	213 (−6)	30,000	4,500
Jul 23	Raleigh Golf Classic	North Carolina	(United States) Kathy Whitworth (61)	212 (−4)	20,000	3,000
Jul 30	Lady Pepsi Open	Georgia	(United States) Jan Ferraris (2)	221 (−5)	25,000	3,750
Aug 6	Knoxville Ladies Classic	Tennessee	(United States) Kathy Whitworth (62)	210 (−3)	25,000	3,750
Aug 13	Pabst Ladies Classic	Ohio	(United States) Marilynn Smith (21)	210 (−6)	30,000	4,500
Aug 20	Southgate Ladies Open	Kansas	(United States) Kathy Whitworth (63)	216 (E)	20,000	3,000
Aug 27	National Jewish Hospital Open	Colorado	(United States) Sandra Haynie (24)	207 (−6)	25,000	3,750
Sep 10	Dallas Civitan Open	Texas	(United States) Jane Blalock (6)	211 (−5)	33,000	4,950
Sep 17	Quality First Classic	Texas	(United States) Sandra Haynie (25)	206 (−10)	20,000	3,000
Sep 25	Lincoln-Mercury Open	California	(United States) Sandra Haynie (26)	215 (−4)	28,000	4,200
Oct 1	Portland Ladies Classic	Oregon	(United States) Kathy Whitworth (64)	212 (−7)	25,000	3,750
Oct 10	Heritage Village Open	Connecticut	(United States) Judy Rankin (7)	212 (−7)	25,000	3,750
Oct 22	GAC Classic	Arizona	(United States) Betsy Rawls (55)	141 (−3)^	30,000	4,500
Oct 29	Corpus Christi Civitan Open	Texas	(United States) Jo Ann Prentice (3)	210 (−6)	20,000	3,000
Nov 5	Lady Errol Classic	Florida	(United States) Jane Blalock (7)	214 (−2)	30,000	4,500

^ - weather-shortened tournament

== Jane Blalock suspension and lawsuit ==
After she finished the second round of the Bluegrass Invitational held in Louisville, Kentucky, Jane Blalock was disqualified for signing an incorrect scorecard. Tourney director Gene McAuliff said Blalock did not mark her ball properly on the 17th green and then failed to take a two-stroke penalty for the infraction as required.

Less than two weeks later, the LPGA executive board suspended Blalock for one year "for actions inconsistent with the code of ethics of the organization". The executive board claimed Blalock had been under suspicion for over a year, that she had moved her ball illegally on multiple occasions and that there were witnesses to these happenings, plus that Blalock had admitted to her guilt. Twenty-seven other LPGA Tour players signed a petition arguing that probation, a fine, and disqualification from the Louisville tournament were not enough punishment. LPGA Executive Director Bud Erickson asked Blalock to feign a back injury so to avoid bad publicity but she refused.

Fellow LPGA Tour golfer Sandra Palmer defended Blalock. In addition to saying she had never seen Blalock commit any rules violations, Palmer stated she didn't understand why the alleged infractions weren't reported at the time they happened and why other players signed Blalock's scorecards without reporting the incidents. Palmer also said, "If you see an infraction of the rules, you should point it out immediately. You don't wait until three years later to report something. Once you've signed that card, you're as guilty as the person who committed the violation." The LPGA executive went on to warn Palmer in regards to her statements. Palmer was also placed on probation for one year by the LPGA Tour and ordered not to make further statements of support for Jane Blalock.

Blalock filed a lawsuit against the LPGA. In the suit, Blalock's lawyers motioned the court asking that Blalock be allowed to continue playing while the suit was resolved. U.S. District Court Judge Charles A. Moye Jr. granted the motion. Moye did however rule that any money Blalock earned while her case was being resolved would be placed in a court trust. Blalock went on to win two more times in 1972, at the Dallas Civitan Open and the Lady Errol Classic.

== Awards ==
Award	Winner	Country
Money winner	Kathy Whitworth (7)	United States
Scoring leader (Vare Trophy)	Kathy Whitworth (7)	United States
Player of the Year	Kathy Whitworth (6)	United States
Rookie of the Year	Jocelyne Bourassa	Canada
