= 1976 LPGA Tour =

Golf tour season

1976 LPGA Tour season
- Duration: January 30, 1976 – November 27, 1976
- Number of official events: 31
- Most wins: 6 (United States) Judy Rankin
- Money leader: (United States) Judy Rankin
- Player of the Year: (United States) Judy Rankin
- Vare Trophy: (United States) Judy Rankin
- Rookie of the Year: (United States) Bonnie Lauer

The 1976 LPGA Tour was the 27th season since the LPGA Tour officially began in 1950. The season ran from January 30 to November 27. The season consisted of 31 official money events. Judy Rankin won the most tournaments, six. She also led the money list with earnings of $150,734.

The season saw the first official tournaments played outside North America; the Colgate European Open in England, the LPGA/Japan Mizuno Classic in Japan, the Colgate-Hong Kong Open in Hong Kong, and the Colgate Far East Championship in the Philippines. There were four first-time winners in 1976: Pat Bradley, Hisako "Chako" Higuchi, the first winner from Japan, Sally Little, the first winner from Africa, and Jan Stephenson.

The tournament results and award winners are listed below.

== Tournament results ==
The following table shows all the official money events for the 1976 season. "Date" is the ending date of the tournament. The numbers in parentheses after the winners' names are the number of wins they had on the tour up to and including that event. Majors are shown in bold.

Date	Tournament	Location	Winner	Score	Purse ($)	1st prize ($)
Feb 1	Burdine's Invitational	Florida	(United States) Judy Rankin (14)	213 (−3)	40,000	5,700
Feb 8	Sarah Coventry Naples Classic	Florida	(Australia) Jan Stephenson (1)	218 (+2)	60,000	8,500
Feb 15	Orange Blossom Classic	Florida	(United States) JoAnne Carner (14)	209 (−7)	45,000	6,400
Feb 22	Bent Tree Classic	Florida	(United States) Kathy Whitworth (75)	209 (−7)	60,000	8,500
Apr 4	Colgate-Dinah Shore Winner's Circle	California	(United States) Judy Rankin (15)	285 (−3)	185,000	32,000
Apr 18	Karsten-Ping Open	Arizona	(United States) Judy Rankin (16)	205 (−11)	80,000	14,000
Apr 25	Birmingham Classic	Alabama	(Australia) Jan Stephenson (2)	203 (−13)	40,000	5,700
May 2	Lady Tara Classic	Georgia	(United States) JoAnne Carner (15)	209 (−10)	50,000	7,000
May 9	Women's International	South Carolina	(South Africa) Sally Little (1)	281 (−7)	70,000	10,000
May 16	American Defender Classic	North Carolina	(United States) Sue Roberts (4)	211 (−5)	45,000	6,400
May 23	'76 LPGA Classic	New Jersey	(United States) Amy Alcott (2)	209 (−4)	76,000	14,000
May 30	**LPGA Championship**	Maryland	(United States) **Betty Burfeindt (4)**	287 (−5)	55,000	8,000
Jun 6	Girl Talk Classic	New York	(United States) Pat Bradley (1)	217 (+1)	76,000	14,000
Jun 13	Peter Jackson Classic	Canada	(United States) Donna Caponi (8)	212 (−4)	60,000	12,000
Jun 20	Hoosier Classic	Indiana	(United States) JoAnne Carner (16)	210 (−6)	50,000	7,000
Jun 27	Babe Zaharias Invitational	Ohio	(United States) Judy Rankin (17)	287 (−1)	100,000	15,000
Jul 4	Bloomington Bicentennial Classic	Indiana	(United States) Sandra Palmer (12)	209 (−4)	50,000	7,000
Jul 11	**U.S. Women's Open**	Pennsylvania	(United States) **JoAnne Carner (17)**	292 (+8)	60,000	9,054
Jul 18	Borden Classic	Ohio	(United States) Judy Rankin (18)	205 (−11)	70,000	10,000
Jul 25	Lady Keystone Open	Pennsylvania	(United States) Susie Berning (11)	215 (−1)	50,000	7,000
Aug 7	Colgate European Open	England	(Japan) Hisako "Chako" Higuchi (1)	284 (−12)	100,000	15,000
Aug 15	Wheeling Classic	West Virginia	(United States) Jane Blalock (13)	217 (+1)	50,000	7,000
Aug 22	Patty Berg Classic	Minnesota	(United States) Kathy Whitworth (76)	212 (−7)	55,000	8,000
Aug 29	National Jewish Hospital Open	Colorado	(United States) Sandra Palmer (13)	206 (−10)	50,000	7,000
Sep 5	Jerry Lewis Muscular Dystrophy Classic	Illinois	(United States) Sandra Palmer (14)	213 (−3)	100,000	15,000
Sep 12	Dallas Civitan Open	Texas	(United States) Jane Blalock (14)	205 (−11)	50,000	7,000
Sep 19	Portland Classic	Oregon	(United States) Donna Caponi (9)	217 (−2)	45,000	6,400
Sep 26	The Carlton	California	(United States) Donna Caponi (10)	282 (−6)	205,000	35,000
Nov 3	LPGA/Japan Mizuno Classic	Japan	(United States) Donna Caponi (11)	217 (−5)	100,000	15,000
Nov 20	Colgate-Hong Kong Open	Hong Kong	(United States) Judy Rankin (19)	216 (E)	50,000	10,000
Nov 27	Colgate Far East Championship	Philippines	(United States) Amy Alcott (3)	211 (−5)	100,000	15,000

== LPGA Tour vs. The Masters Tournament ==
In January 1976 the LPGA Tour announced the formation of a new tournament. It was to be titled the Ladies Masters and sponsors said they would pattern the event similar to the Masters Tournament. A little over a month later the LPGA announced the tournament's name was being changed to the Women's International. This happened after Masters Tournament officials contacted the tournament's sponsor and threatened to go to court unless the word Masters wasn't removed from the tournament title.

The Women's International proved to be a short lived event. Its final edition was played in 1985.

== Awards ==
Award	Winner	Country
Money winner	Judy Rankin	United States
Scoring leader (Vare Trophy)	Judy Rankin (2)	United States
Player of the Year	Judy Rankin	United States
Rookie of the Year	Bonnie Lauer	United States
