= 1981 LPGA Tour =

Golf tour season

1981 LPGA Tour season
- Duration: January 29, 1981 – November 8, 1981
- Number of official events: 36
- Most wins: 5 (United States) Donna Caponi
- Money leader: (United States) Beth Daniel
- Player of the Year: (United States) JoAnne Carner
- Vare Trophy: (United States) JoAnne Carner
- Rookie of the Year: (United States) Patty Sheehan

The 1981 LPGA Tour was the 32nd season since the LPGA Tour officially began in 1950. The season ran from January 29 to November 8. The season consisted of 36 official money events. Donna Caponi won the most tournaments, five. Beth Daniel led the money list with earnings of $206,998, becoming the first player to win over $200,000 in a season.

The season saw the first tournament with a $50,000 first prize, the World Championship of Women's Golf. There were five first-time winners in 1981: Patty Hayes, Kathy Hite, Cathy Reynolds, Patty Sheehan, and Beth Solomon.

The tournament results and award winners are listed below.

== Tournament results ==
The following table shows all the official money events for the 1981 season. "Date" is the ending date of the tournament. The numbers in parentheses after the winners' names are the number of wins they had on the tour up to and including that event. Majors are shown in bold.

| Date | Tournament | Location | Winner | Score | Purse ($) | 1st prize ($) |
|---|---|---|---|---|---|---|
| Feb 1 | Whirlpool Championship of Deer Creek | Florida | (United States) Sandra Palmer (17) | 284 (−8) | 100,000 | 15,000 |
| Feb 8 | Elizabeth Arden Classic | Florida | (South Africa) Sally Little (8) | 283 (−5) | 125,000 | 18,750 |
| Feb 15 | S&H Golf Classic | Florida | (United States) JoAnne Carner (30) | 215 (−1) | 100,000 | 15,000 |
| Feb 22 | Bent Tree Ladies Classic | Florida | (United States) Amy Alcott (14) | 276 (−12) | 150,000 | 22,500 |
| Mar 1 | Olympia Gold Classic | California | (South Africa) Sally Little (9) | 142 (−4)^ | 150,000 | 22,500 |
| Mar 8 | Arizona Copper Classic | Arizona | (United States) Nancy Lopez (21) | 278 (−14) | 125,000 | 18,750 |
| Mar 15 | Sun City Classic | Arizona | (United States) Patty Hayes (1) | 277 (−15) | 100,000 | 15,000 |
| Mar 22 | LPGA Desert Inn Pro-Am | Nevada | (United States) Donna Caponi (20) | 286 (−3) | 200,000 | 30,000 |
| Mar 29 | Women's Kemper Open | California | (United States) Pat Bradley (8) | 284 (E) | 175,000 | 26,250 |
| Apr 5 | Colgate-Dinah Shore | California | (United States) Nancy Lopez (22) | 277 (−11) | 250,000 | 37,500 |
| Apr 12 | American Defender/WRAL Golf Classic | North Carolina | (United States) Donna Caponi (21) | 208 (−8) | 125,000 | 18,750 |
| Apr 19 | Florida Lady Citrus | Florida | (United States) Beth Daniel (6) | 281 (−7) | 100,000 | 15,000 |
| Apr 26 | Birmingham Classic | Alabama | (United States) Beth Solomon (1) | 206 (−10) | 100,000 | 15,000 |
| May 3 | CPC Women's International | South Carolina | (South Africa) Sally Little (10) | 287 (−1) | 125,000 | 18,750 |
| May 10 | Lady Michelob | Georgia | (United States) Amy Alcott (15) | 209 (−8) | 125,000 | 18,750 |
| May 17 | Coca-Cola Classic | New Jersey | (United States) Kathy Whitworth (81) | 211 (−8) | 125,000 | 18,750 |
| May 24 | Corning Classic | New York | (United States) Kathy Hite (1) | 282 (−6) | 125,000 | 18,750 |
| May 31 | Golden Lights Championship | Connecticut | (United States) Cathy Reynolds (1) | 285 (−3) | 125,000 | 18,750 |
| Jun 7 | McDonald's Classic | Pennsylvania | (Canada) Sandra Post (8) | 282 (−6) | 150,000 | 22,500 |
| Jun 14 | **LPGA Championship** | Ohio | (United States) **Donna Caponi (22)** | 280 (−8) | 150,000 | 22,500 |
| Jun 21 | Lady Keystone Open | Pennsylvania | (United States) JoAnne Carner (31) | 203 (−13) | 125,000 | 18,750 |
| Jun 28 | The Sarah Coventry | New York | (United States) Nancy Lopez (23) | 285 (−7) | 125,000 | 18,750 |
| Jul 5 | **Peter Jackson Classic** | Canada | (Australia) **Jan Stephenson (5)** | 278 (−10) | 200,000 | 30,000 |
| Jul 12 | Mayflower Classic | Indiana | (United States) Debbie Austin (7) | 279 (−9) | 150,000 | 22,500 |
| Jul 19 | WUI Classic | New York | (United States) Donna Caponi (23) | 282 (−2) | 125,000 | 18,750 |
| Jul 26 | **U.S. Women's Open** | Illinois | (United States) **Pat Bradley (9)** | 279 (−9) | 150,000 | 22,000 |
| Aug 2 | Boston Five Classic | Massachusetts | (United States) Donna Caponi (24) | 276 (−12) | 150,000 | 22,500 |
| Aug 9 | West Virginia Bank Classic | West Virginia | (United States) Hollis Stacy (8) | 212 (−4) | 125,000 | 18,750 |
| Aug 16 | Mary Kay Classic | Texas | (Australia) Jan Stephenson (6) | 198 (−18) | 155,000 | 23,250 |
| Aug 23 | World Championship of Women's Golf | Ohio | (United States) Beth Daniel (7) | 284 (−4) | 150,000 | 50,000 |
| Aug 30 | Columbia Savings LPGA Classic | Colorado | (United States) JoAnne Carner (32) | 278 (−10) | 150,000 | 22,500 |
| Sep 7 | Rail Charity Golf Classic | Illinois | (United States) JoAnne Carner (33) | 205 (−11) | 125,000 | 18,750 |
| Sep 13 | United Virginia Bank Classic | Virginia | (Australia) Jan Stephenson (7) | 205 (−14) | 125,000 | 18,750 |
| Sep 20 | Henredon Classic | North Carolina | (United States) Sandra Haynie (40) | 281 (−7) | 165,000 | 24,750 |
| Oct 11 | Inamori Classic | California | (United States) Hollis Stacy (9) | 286 (−6) | 150,000 | 22,500 |
| Nov 8 | Mazda Japan Classic | Japan | (United States) Patty Sheehan (1) | 213 (−9) | 250,000 | 30,000 |

^ - weather-shortened tournament

== Awards ==
| Award | Winner | Country |
|---|---|---|
| Money winner | Beth Daniel (2) | United States |
| Scoring leader (Vare Trophy) | JoAnne Carner (3) | United States |
| Player of the Year | JoAnne Carner (2) | United States |
| Rookie of the Year | Patty Sheehan | United States |
