= 1970 LPGA Tour =

Golf tour season

1970 LPGA Tour season
- Duration: February 12, 1970 – October 25, 1970
- Number of official events: 21
- Most wins: 4 (United States) Shirley Englehorn
- Money leader: (United States) Kathy Whitworth
- Player of the Year: (United States) Sandra Haynie
- Vare Trophy: (United States) Kathy Whitworth
- Rookie of the Year: (United States) JoAnne Carner

The 1970 LPGA Tour was the 21st season since the LPGA Tour officially began in 1950. The season ran from February 12 to October 25. The season consisted of 21 official money events. Shirley Englehorn won the most tournaments, four. Kathy Whitworth led the money list with earnings of $30,235.

There were two first-time winners in 1970: Kathy Ahern and Jane Blalock.

The tournament results and award winners are listed below.

== Tournament results ==
The following table shows all the official money events for the 1970 season. "Date" is the ending date of the tournament. The numbers in parentheses after the winners' names are the number of wins they had on the tour up to and including that event. Majors are shown in bold.

Date	Tournament	Location	Winner	Score	Purse ($)	1st prize ($)
Feb 15	Burdine's Invitational	Florida	(United States) Carol Mann (29)	216 (E)	40,000	6,000
Mar 22	Orange Blossom Classic	Florida	(United States) Kathy Whitworth (54)	216 (E)	18,500	2,775
Apr 19	Raleigh Ladies Invitational	North Carolina	(United States) Sandra Haynie (18)	212 (−4)	16,500	2,475
May 3	Shreveport Kiwanis Invitational	Louisiana	(United States) Sandra Haynie (19)	214 (−2)	15,000	2,250
May 10	Dallas Civitan Open	Texas	(United States) Betsy Rawls (53)	214 (+1)	25,000	3,750
May 17	Johnny Londoff Chevrolet Tournament	Missouri	(United States) Shirley Englehorn (8)	216 (E)	22,000	3,075
May 24	Bluegrass Invitational	Kentucky	(United States) Donna Caponi (3)	214 (−2)	20,000	3,000
May 31	O'Sullivan Ladies Open	Virginia	(United States) Shirley Englehorn (9)	210 (−6)	15,000	1,150
Jun 7	Lady Carling Open	Maryland	(United States) Shirley Englehorn (10)	210 (−9)	22,500	3,375
Jun 13	**LPGA Championship**	Massachusetts	(United States) **Shirley Englehorn (11)**	285 (−7)	30,000	4,500
Jun 21	George Washington Golf Classic	Pennsylvania	(United States) Judy Rankin (2)	212 (−7)	25,000	3,750
Jun 28	Len Immke Buick Open	Ohio	(United States) Mary Mills (7)	216 (E)	20,000	3,000
Jul 5	**U.S. Women's Open**	Oklahoma	(United States) **Donna Caponi (4)**	287 (−1)	30,000	5,000
Jul 19	Springfield Jaycee Open	Ohio	(United States) Judy Rankin (3)	209 (−10)	20,000	3,000
Aug 9	Lady Carling Open	Georgia	(United States) Jane Blalock (1)	221 (+2)	20,000	3,000
Aug 16	Cincinnati Open	Ohio	(United States) Betsy Rawls (54)	210 (−6)	20,000	3,000
Aug 23	Southgate Ladies Open	Kansas	(United States) Kathy Ahern (1)	211 (−5)	20,000	3,000
Sep 13	Wendell-West Open	Washington	(United States) JoAnne Carner (2)	214 (−2)	40,000	6,000
Sep 26	Lincoln-Mercury Open	California	(United States) Judy Rankin (4)	217 (−2)	23,000	3,450
Oct 18	Quality Chek'd Classic	Texas	(United States) Kathy Whitworth (55)	205 (−11)	15,000	2,250
Oct 25	Women's Golf Charities Open	Texas	(United States) Marilynn Smith (20)	214 (−2)	17,500	2,625

== Awards ==
Award	Winner	Country
Money winner	Kathy Whitworth (5)	United States
Scoring leader (Vare Trophy)	Kathy Whitworth (5)	United States
Player of the Year	Sandra Haynie	United States
Rookie of the Year	JoAnne Carner	United States
