= Jane Blalock =

American professional golfer (born 1945)

Personal information
- Full name: Barbara Jane Blalock
- Nationality: United States
- Born: September 19, 1945 (age 81) Portsmouth, New Hampshire, U.S.
- Height: 5 ft 6 in (1.68 m)

Career
- Sport: Golf
- College: Rollins College
- Turned professional: 1969
- Former tour: LPGA Tour (1969–87)
- Professional wins: 35

Number of wins by tour
- LPGA Tour: 27
- LPGA of Japan Tour: 4
- Other: 5

Best results in LPGA major championships
- Titleholders C'ship: T7: 1972
- Chevron Championship: T34: 1985, 1986
- Women's PGA C'ship: 2nd: 1972, 1980
- U.S. Women's Open: 3rd/T3: 1971, 1976
- du Maurier Classic: 4th: 1980

Achievements and awards
- LPGA Tour Rookie of the Year: 1969

Barbara Jane Blalock (born September 19, 1945) is an American business executive and retired professional golfer. After winning several New England golf tournaments in her youth, Blalock joined the LPGA Tour as a professional in 1969, being named LPGA Tour Rookie of the Year in 1969 and Most Improved Golfer in 1970 and 1971. She won the historically notable Dinah Shore Colgate Winner's Circle in 1972, earning "the richest prize in women's golf history." After successfully fighting a suspension from the LPGA for allegedly signing an incorrect scorecard a month after Dinah Shore, by 1977 she was the sixth-highest paid female golfer of all time. The Evening Independent described her as "one of the foremost women golfers of her time" the following year. Nursing a herniated disc, Blalock failed to win a tournament from 1981 until 1984, though after two wins in 1985 she was named Comeback Player of the Year by Golf Digest.

Since retiring in 1987, Blalock continues to hold the world record for "most consecutive cuts made on a professional [golf] tour," with her 299 unbroken cuts considered the longest streak for any LPGA Tour or PGA Tour player in history. She also has the most wins of any LPGA player without a major championship. Voted into the Legends Hall of Fame in 2014 by a committee of LPGA veterans, she remains founder and CEO of both the Legends Tour for veteran female LPGA golfers and the LPGA Golf Clinics for Women. Her company, JBC Golf, Inc., manages both programs. Associated with various boards and non-profit organizations, she has authored two books: The Guts To Win (Simon & Schuster, 1977) and Gimmies, Bogies and Business (Mastermedia, 1999).

== Early life ==
Jane Blalock was born in Portsmouth, New Hampshire on September 19, 1945. Raised in Portsmouth, her father, Richard Blalock, worked as a newspaper editor in town. She began golfing at age 13, and credits her family with being supportive of her different endeavors, including athletics. She spent years practicing golf at the nearby country club.

== Amateur career ==
Blalock attended Rollins College in Winter Park, Florida. She continued to play amateur golf as she studied, winning the New Hampshire Amateur in 1965, 1966, and 1968, and also winning the Florida Intercollegiate Championship in 1966. She graduated from Rollins College in 1967 with a degree in history.

Blalock began working as a high school history teacher upon graduation. A year later she borrowed money to return from New Hampshire to Florida, where she spent five weeks taking lessons from golfer and instructor Bob Toski, who was also from New England. She won the New England Amateur tournament in 1967 and 1968. The following winter, Blalock returned to work at a country club in Florida, laboring on the driving range and doing odd jobs while listening to Toski advise students.

== Professional career ==
=== Golf career ===
At the age of 23, though she had yet to win a tournament outside of New England, Blalock left her job as a history teacher; she attempted to become a professional golfer. Her first purse was in Louisville, Kentucky in 1969 for $264. She earned 1969 LPGA Tour Rookie of the Year. Blalock won her first professional tour victory at the Lady Carling Event in Atlanta, Georgia in 1970, beating Betsy Rawls by one stroke. Blalock won Most Improved Golfer at the LGPA Golf Awards in both 1970 and 1971, and those same years Golf Digest named her their "most improved professional."

On April 16, 1972, won the inaugural version of the Dinah Shore Colgate Winner's Circle, earning "the richest prize in women's gold history" with the $20,000 first place award. The Dinah Shore event would later be upgraded to a women's major golf championship. That moment for [female golfers] was 40 years ago [at Dinah Shore]. We began getting corporate-type sponsors. We had celebrities wanting to meet us and play with us. We were asked to do television commercials." Blalock in particular recollects doing a commercial with Jan Miner.

In May 1972, she won the Suzuki Golf International Tournament in Pasadena, California, besting Kathy Whitworth. Shortly afterwards Blalock was disqualified from the Bluegrass Invitational for allegedly placing a ball incorrectly, and then failing to mark a two stroke penalty on her scorecard. Within a month, the LPGA Tour would move to suspend Blalock. In response, she filed an anti-trust lawsuit against the LPGA, obtaining an order to allow her to continue playing until the lawsuit had run its course. The rules violation conflict would continue until 1975, when after losing several appeals and being ordered to pay damages to Blalock, the LPGA agreed to settle. Despite the ongoing lawsuit, in 1972 Blalock went on to win the Dallas Civitan Open and the Lady Errol Classic. Blalock came in second at the 1972 LPGA Championship.

In 1975, Blalock won the World Ladies Championship in Japan, an achievement which she would repeat the very next year. Golf Magazine named her to its All-American Team twice, also naming her to its LPGA All-American Team for three consecutive years total. In 1976, Blalock testified for the LPGA Tour in support of a sponsor trying to host a Women's Masters. Blalock continued to win tournaments into 1976, and in September the Times Daily reported that she had "coasted to a whopping nineshot victory" in the $50,000 Dallas Civitan Open." The article detailed that "Blalock's one-under 71 Sunday produced a tournament record 11-under 205 for the 54-hole distance, breaking the previous best - set last year by Carol Mann - by three shots. It was the widest victory margin on the ladies tour this year."

In 1977 she published her autobiography, The Guts to Win, through Simon & Schuster. That year she won $102,012 total, becoming "the fourth women ever to reach that level of excellence." At that point she had won 18 tournaments and was the sixth-highest paid female golfer of all time. She won the Colgate Triple Crown in 1975 and 1977, also winning the International Mixed Championship at Waterville, Ireland in 1978 while teamed up with Ray Floyd. In 1978, Greg Hanson of The Evening Independent described her as "one of the foremost women golfers of her time," calling her experience with the suspension a "dark age" in the LPGA's behavior.

By 1980, Blalock held the record for "going through 299 consecutive tournaments without missing a cut (1969 through 1980)," which was a record for both the LPGA and PGA. She broke her streak on October 10, 1980, after the LPGA requested she play at Inamori Golf Classic outside San Diego, California. Afterwards she went winless for four years. Writing a column for the Miami Herald in 1981, Blalock expressed frustration with the LPGA's use of sex appeal in promoting the women's tour, noting particularly controversial photos of Jan Stephenson in the tour publication Fairways Magazine. In July 1983, Blalock became the LPGA's seventh "millionaire" in terms of winnings.

From 1981 until 1984, Blalock failed to win a tournament as she nursed a herniated disc. However, in March 1985 she won the Women's Kemper Open in Hawaii, her 26th LPGA victory in sixteen years. She also won the Mazda Japan Classic that year, as one of her two final victories on the LPGA tour. In 1985, Golf Digest named her Comeback Player of the Year. Leaving the LPGA tour in 1985 but not the sport, she retired from full-time competition in 1987. By April 1987, she had won 27 events and accumulated $1,300,000 in prize money, with 11 holes-in-one. In early 1988, she retired from women's professional golf to become a financial consultant. Since retiring, Blalock continues to hold the world record for "most consecutive cuts made on a professional [golf] tour," with her 299 cuts considered the longest streak for any LPGA Tour or PGA Tour player in history, beating the second-best record held by Tiger Woods by over 150 cuts.

Total, Blalock's website states she has won 27 LPGA titles, two World Championships, and two Triple Crown titles from her days touring with the LPGA. Twice she finished second at the LPGA Championship. When she earned her two final victories in the 1980s, she had achieved the most wins of any LPGA player without a major championship.

In 1972, however, Blalock won an event that in 1983 was upgraded to major status – the Dinah Shore Colgate Winner's Circle. In 2022, the LPGA changed the name of the tournament to the Chevron Championship.

Blalock has been inducted into both the New England Sports Hall of Fame and the Vince Lombardi Hall of Fame. Her 27 LPGA tournament wins meant that for years she matched the point total required for inclusion in the LPGA Hall of Fame, though she lacked the major win necessary for consideration. Blalock was voted into the Legends Hall of Fame in July 2014.

=== Business career ===
Blalock founded the annual University of New Hampshire Pro-Am Classic tournament in 1981, which raises funds for women's athletic scholarships at the University of New Hampshire through the UNH Jane Blalock Athletic Scholarship Fund. The athletics department at the University of New Hampshire also gives out the Jane Blalock Rookie of the Year Award. The athletics department at the University of New Hampshire also gives out the Jane Blalock Rookie of the Year Award. Blalock began working for Merrill Lynch in 1986, and as of April 1987, she was living near Boston and working for Merrill Lynch as a vice president. Shortly before she retired from professional golf in 1988, in 1987 Blalock founded The Jane Blalock Company (JBC) in Boston, initially focusing on creating a "consulting and event implementation business." In 1990 she became CEO of JBC Golf, Inc., a new incarnation of her company. JBC would go on to develop relationships with the LPGA Tour, the PGA Tour, and the Senior PGA Tour, as well as with various sponsors and non-profit organizations.

Blalock was appointed to the President's Council for Sports and Physical Fitness in 1990, receiving the appointment from George H. W. Bush. Also in 1990, Blalock founded the LPGA Golf Clinics for Women program, helping teach the clinics herself. The inaugural clinic was held over three days in Washington, D.C., selling out its 100 spots. She later held a clinic in May 1991 as a day-long program sponsored by Mazda, with the intent of building skill and confidence among businesswomen players. The LPGA Golf Clinics for Women are taught by LPGA Teaching and Club Professionals. In 1995, JBC Golf received the Susan G. Komen Breast Cancer Foundation's Volunteerism Award for work on the Gillette LPGA Golf Clinic Series. Blalock has been a periodic television commentator for ESPN Golf, and she has also been a golf commentator for NBC. She published her second book Gimmies, Bogeys and Business, a "guide to using golf for success in business," in 1999.

=== Legends Tours (1994–present) ===
In December 1994, publications such as the Los Angeles Times and the Seattle Times reported that Blalock was organizing the Volvo Legends Series for women aged 45 and older. 24 players had accepted invitations to participate at that point, including JoAnne Carner, Kathy Whitworth, Sandra Haynie, Sandra Palmer, Judy Rankin, Carol Mann and Donna Caponi. Two Volvo tournaments, one in Phoenix, Arizona and one in Atlanta, took place in 1995 for $150,000 each. Prime Network broadcast delayed television coverage of the events. While Blalock clarified that the Volvo Legends Series was not officially affiliated with the LPGA, she did state that "neither [is the LPGA] opposed." The Volvo series put on two successful events before dissolving after one year.

From 1996 to 2000, Blalock worked to organize a new senior golf tour for older and often retired LPGA athletes. After receiving support from 24 other founding members and a 3-year sponsorship program from the Green Bay Chamber of Commerce, The Women's Senior Golf Tour debuted in August 2000 in Green Bay, Wisconsin with a minimum age of 43 and a $500,000 purse, with $75,000 going to the winner. Around 30,000 people attended over three days. The senior tour paid a fee to the LPGA for permission to involve active LPGA players, but otherwise remained independent. Blalock worked to make sure the tour was the official senior tour of the LPGA in 2001, and the Women's Senior Golf Tour is now called the Legends Tour. Initially it grew from two annual events to 11 events by 2013, to 14 events in 2016. The tour has donated significant amounts to charity. Blalock was on the WSGT board of directors for years, later CEO of The Legends Tour (The WDGA).

== Personal life ==
In 1986, Blalock moved from Florida to Boston, Massachusetts to work in finance. As of 2016, Blalock continues to maintain an office in Boston. She also remains involved with the Blalock family restaurant, which she helped open in June 1975 as Old Ferry Landing in Portsmouth, New Hampshire. Blalock's likeness on the golf course has been painted by American artist LeRoy Neiman.

== Bibliography ==
Books written by Jane Blalock
Year	Release title	Publisher	ISBN
1977	The Guts To Win	Simon & Schuster	ISBN 978-0671227975
1999	Gimmies, Bogies and Business	Mastermedia Publishing Company	ISBN 978-1571010605

== Awards and honors ==
Yr	Award	Nominee	Category	Result
1969	LPGA Awards	Jane Blalock	LPGA Tour Rookie of the Year	Won
1970	LPGA Awards	Jane Blalock	Most Improved Golfer	Won
1970	Golf Digest	Jane Blalock	Most Improved Professional	Won
1971	LPGA Awards	Jane Blalock	Most Improved Golfer	Won
1971	Golf Digest	Jane Blalock	Most Improved Professional	Won
1985	Golf Digest	Jane Blalock	Comeback Player of the Year	Won
1986	Vince Lombardi; Tournament of Champions	Jane Blalock	Vince Lombardi Hall of Fame	Inductee
1987	National Association for Girls and Women in Sport	Jane Blalock	Professional Athlete of the Year Award	Inaugural; Win
1995	Susan G. Komen; Foundation Awards	JBC Golf, Inc.	Volunteerism Award	Won
1998	New England Sports Hall of Fame	Jane Blalock	New England Women's; Sports Hall of Fame	Inaugural; Inductee
2000	State of New Hampshire	Jane Blalock	New Hampshire Top Ten Athletes of the Century Award	Won
2014	Legends Hall of Fame	Jane Blalock	Legends Hall of Fame	Inductee

== Professional wins (34) ==
=== LPGA Tour wins (27) ===
No.	Date	Tournament	Winning score	Margin of victory	Runner(s)-up
1	Aug 9, 1970	Lady Carling Open	+2 (72-79-70=221)	1 stroke	(United States) Betsy Rawls
2	Jun 11, 1971	George Washington Classic	−11 (68-72-68=208)	2 strokes	(United States) JoAnne Carner
3	Aug 8, 1971	Lady Pepsi Open	−5 (72-70-72=214)	1 stroke	(United States) JoAnne Carner
4	Apr 16, 1972	Dinah Shore Colgate Winner's Circle	−3 (71-70-72=213)	3 strokes	(United States) Carol Mann (United States) Judy Rankin
5	May 14, 1972	Suzuki Golf Internationale	−8 (68-70-70=208)	1 stroke	(United States) Kathy Whitworth
6	Sep 10, 1972	Dallas Civitan Open	−5 (68-74-69=211)	Playoff	(United States) Kathy Whitworth
7	Nov 5, 1972	Lady Errol Classic	−2 (71-70-73=214)	Playoff	(United States) Sandra Palmer (United States) Kathy Whitworth
8	Mar 17, 1974	Bing Crosby International Classic	−1 (74-74-67=215)	2 strokes	(United States) Jo Ann Prentice
9	Apr 28, 1974	Birmingham Classic	−5 (73-68-70=211)	3 strokes	(United States) Sandra Palmer
10	Sep 2, 1974	Southgate Ladies Open	−2 (70-72=142)	Tie^{[1]}	(United States) Sue Roberts
11	Nov 24, 1974	Lady Errol Classic	−1 (70-75-70=215)	Playoff	(United States) Jo Ann Prentice
12	Mar 29, 1975	Karsten-Ping Open	−7 (70-71-68=209)	1 stroke	(United States) JoAnne Carner
13	Aug 15, 1976	Wheeling Classic	+1 (72-72-73=217)	Playoff	(United States) Pat Bradley
14	Sep 12, 1976	Dallas Civitan Open	−11 (67-67-71=205)	9 strokes	(United States) Kathy Whitworth
15	May 15, 1977	Greater Baltimore Golf Classic	−10 (69-72-68=209)	3 strokes	(United States) Joyce Kazmierski (Japan) Takako Kiyamoto
16	Sep 25, 1977	The Sarah Coventry	−10 (72-70-69-71=282)	3 strokes	(United States) Debbie Austin (United States) Pat Meyers
17	Feb 20, 1978	Orange Blossom Classic	−4 (71-71-70=212)	2 strokes	(United States) Gloria Ehret
18	Jul 3, 1978	Mayflower Classic	−7 (69-72-68=209)	3 strokes	(United States) Joyce Kazmierski
19	Jul 9, 1978	Wheeling Classic	−9 (68-67-72=207)	7 strokes	(United States) Kathy Martin
20	May 29, 1978	Golden Lights Championship (California)	−12 (67-68-70-71=276)	2 strokes	(United States) Hollis Stacy
21	Feb 25, 1979	Orange Blossom Classic	−11 (66-69-70=205)	6 strokes	(Canada) Sandra Post
22	Apr 22, 1979	Florida Lady Citrus	−6 (74-68-74-70=286)	Playoff	(United States) JoAnne Carner
23	Apr 29, 1979	Otey Crisman Classic	−11 (68-65-72=205)	6 strokes	(United States) Pat Bradley
24	Jun 17, 1979	The Sarah Coventry	−12 (69-70-69-72=280)	6 strokes	(United States) Alice Ritzman
25	Feb 10, 1980	Elizabeth Arden Classic	−5 (70-66-73-74=283)	1 stroke	(United States) Jerilyn Britz (United States) Debbie Massey
26	Mar 17, 1985	Women's Kemper Open	−5 (71-69-72-75=287)	1 stroke	(United States) Pat Bradley
27	Nov 10, 1985	Mazda Japan Classic	−10 (72-70-64=206)	2 strokes	(Taiwan) Ai-Yu Tu

^{1} The 1974 Southgate Ladies Open was shortened to 36 holes due to inclement weather. Since a playoff was not possible, Blalock and Sue Roberts were declared co-champions.

- Blalock won the Dinah Shore Colgate Winner's Circle (now known as the Kraft Nabisco Championship) before it became a major championship.

LPGA Tour playoff record (5–3)

No.	Year	Tournament	Opponent(s)	Result
1	1971	Quality First Classic	(United States) Judy Rankin	Lost to par on second extra hole
2	1972	Dallas Civitan Open	(United States) Kathy Whitworth	Won with birdie on first extra hole
3	1972	Lady Errol Classic	(United States) Sandra Palmer (United States) Kathy Whitworth	Won with birdie on third extra hole
4	1974	Colgate-Dinah Shore Winner's Circle	(United States) Sandra Haynie (United States) Jo Ann Prentice	Prentice won with birdie on fourth extra hole Haynie eliminated by par on second hole
5	1974	Lady Errol Classic	(United States) Jo Ann Prentice	Won with birdie on first extra hole
6	1976	Wheeling Classic	(United States) Pat Bradley	Won with par on first extra hole
7	1979	Florida Lady Citrus	(United States) JoAnne Carner	Won with par on second extra hole
8	1981	Birmingham Classic	(United States) Beth Solomon	Lost to par on third extra hole

=== LPGA of Japan Tour wins (4) ===
- 1975 (1) World Ladies
- 1976 (1) World Ladies
- 1978 (1) Isuzu Ladies Cup
- 1985 (1) Mazda Japan Classic^{1}

^{1}Co-sanctioned by the LPGA Tour

=== Other wins (4) ===
- 1972 (1) Angelo's Four-Ball Championship (with Sandra Palmer)
- 1973 (1) Angelo's Four-Ball Championship (with Sandra Palmer)
- 1975 (1) Colgate Triple Crown
- 1977 (1) Colgate Triple Crown

=== Legends of the LPGA wins (1) ===
- 2023 BJ's Charity Championship (with Patricia Meunier-Lebouc)

== See also ==
- List of golfers with most LPGA Tour wins
- List of ANA Inspiration champions
- List of Rollins College alumni
