= JoAnne Carner =

American professional golfer (born 1939)

Personal information
- Full name: JoAnne Gunderson Carner
- Nicknames: The Great Gundy, Big Mama
- Nationality: United States
- Born: April 4, 1939 (age 87) Kirkland, Washington, U.S.
- Height: 5 ft 7 in (1.70 m)
- Spouses: Don Carner (m. 1963–99, his death)

Career
- Sport: Golf
- College: Arizona State University
- Turned professional: 1970
- Former tour: LPGA Tour (1970–2005)
- Professional wins: 49

Number of wins by tour
- LPGA Tour: 43
- Other: 6

Best results in LPGA major championships (wins: 2)
- Western Open: T2: 1959
- Titleholders C'ship: T10: 1972
- Chevron Championship: T2: 1989
- Women's PGA C'ship: 2nd: 1974, 1982, 1992
- U.S. Women's Open: Won: 1971, 1976
- du Maurier Classic: 2nd/T2: 1980, 1983
- Women's British Open: DNP

Achievements and awards
- World Golf Hall of Fame: 1982 (member page)
- LPGA Tour Rookie of the Year: 1970
- LPGA Tour Money Winner: 1974, 1982, 1983
- LPGA Tour Player of the Year: 1974, 1981, 1982
- LPGA Vare Trophy: 1974, 1975, 1981, 1982, 1983
- USGA Bob Jones Award: 1981
- GWAA Female Player of the Year: 1982, 1983
- LPGA William and Mousie Powell Award: 1995

JoAnne Gunderson Carner (born April 4, 1939) is an American professional golfer. Her 43 victories on the LPGA Tour led to her induction in the World Golf Hall of Fame. She is the only woman to have won the U.S. Girls' Junior, U.S. Women's Amateur, and U.S. Women's Open titles, and was the first person to win three different USGA championship events. Tiger Woods is the only man to have won the equivalent three USGA titles. Arnold Palmer, Jack Nicklaus, and Carol Semple Thompson have also won three different USGA titles.

== Early life and amateur career ==
Gunderson was born in Kirkland, Washington, a suburb east of Seattle. She was known as "The Great Gundy" early in her career.

In 1960, while attending Arizona State University, she won the national intercollegiate individual golf championship. In 1961, Carner graduated from ASU. She was a member of Kappa Alpha Theta.

From 1956 to 1968, she was the dominant woman in amateur golf. She won the U.S. Women's Amateur five times: in 1957, 1960, 1962, 1966, and 1968. She is second all-time, only behind Glenna Collett Vare who had six. She was runner-up two other times (1956, 1964). In 1966, Carner needed 5 extra holes (41 holes in total) to beat Marlene Stewart Streit in the longest final match in U.S. Women's Amateur history. She also won the U.S. Girls' Junior in 1956.

While still an amateur in 1969, Carner won an LPGA Tour event, the Burdine's Invitational. She was the last amateur to win on the LPGA Tour until 15-year-old New Zealander Lydia Ko won the CN Canadian Women's Open in 2012.

She remained an amateur until the age of 30. Late in her professional career, she captained the 1994 Solheim Cup team.

== Professional career ==
In 1970, at the age of 30, she turned professional. Carner's greatest professional victories were her two U.S. Women's Opens, in 1971 and 1976. She led after each round in 1971 and won easily, finishing seven shots better than Kathy Whitworth who finished in second. In 1976, Carner needed an 18-hole playoff to defeat Sandra Palmer.

Big Mama (her other nickname) was the second player in LPGA history to cross the $1 million mark in career earnings. She had an unusually long career, remaining competitive through the late 1990s. During 2004, she still played 10 tournaments and became the oldest player to make a cut on the LPGA Tour at age 65.

On July 29 and 30, 2021, Carner played in the U.S. Senior Women's Open at Brooklawn Country Club in Fairfield, Connecticut and shot her age (82) in the first round, and bettered that by shooting 79 in the second round. Although she did not make the cut, she became the fifth golfer ever to shoot their age or better multiple times in a USGA championship while also being the oldest golfer ever to play in a USGA championship.

== Personal life ==
In 1963, she married Don Carner. He also served as her coach and business manager. They were married 36 years until his death at age 83 in 1999 after a long illness. The couple was known for driving from tournament to tournament and staying in an Airstream trailer.

== Awards and honors ==
- In 1969, Carner was inducted into the Rhode Island Heritage Hall of Fame.
- In 1981, Carner was voted the Bob Jones Award, the highest honor given by the United States Golf Association in recognition of distinguished sportsmanship in golf.

== Amateur wins ==
- 1956 U.S. Girls' Junior
- 1957 U.S. Women's Amateur
- 1959 Women's Western Amateur
- 1960 U.S. Women's Amateur
- 1962 U.S. Women's Amateur
- 1966 U.S. Women's Amateur
- 1968 U.S. Women's Amateur

== Professional wins (49) ==
=== LPGA Tour wins (43) ===
Legend
LPGA Tour major championships (2)
Other LPGA Tour (41)

No.	Date	Tournament	Winning score	Margin of victory	Runner(s)-up
1	Jan 19, 1969	Burdine's Invitational ^{[1]}	E (73-73-70=216)	1 stroke	(United States) Shirley Englehorn
2	Sep 12, 1970	Wendell-West Open	−2 (72-73-69=214)	Playoff	(United States) Marilynn Smith
3	Jun 27, 1971	U.S. Women's Open	E (70-73-72-73=288)	7 strokes	(United States) Kathy Whitworth
4	Aug 1, 1971	Bluegrass Invitational	−6 (71-71-68=210)	3 strokes	(United States) Sandra Haynie
5	May 19, 1974	Bluegrass Invitational (2)	−4 (72-70-73=215)	Playoff	(United States) Sandra Spuzich
6	May 26, 1974	Hoosier LPGA Classic	−6 (73-72-68=213)	2 strokes	(United States) Donna Caponi (United States) Judy Rankin
7	Jun 9, 1974	Desert Inn Classic	−4 (74-68-72-70=284)	1 stroke	(United States) Carole Jo Kabler
8	Aug 18, 1974	St. Paul Open	−7 (68-70-74=212)	4 strokes	(United States) Laura Baugh
9	Sep 8, 1974	Dallas Civitan Open	+1 (71-72-74=217)	1 stroke	(United States) Kathy Whitworth
10	Sep 29, 1974	Portland Ladies Classic	−5 (70-70-71=211)	2 strokes	(United States) Donna Caponi
11	May 25, 1975	American Defender Classic	−10 (69-68-69=206)	Playoff	(United States) Judy Rankin
12	Jun 8, 1975	Girl Talk Classic	−6 (68-72-73=213)	6 strokes	(United States) Sandra Spuzich
13	Jun 29, 1975	Peter Jackson Classic	−5 (73-69-72=214)	Playoff	(United States) Carol Mann
14	Feb 15, 1976	Orange Blossom Classic (2)	−7 (65-71-73=209)	Playoff	(United States) Sandra Palmer
15	June 21, 1976	Lady Tara Classic	−10 (72-67-70=209)	3 strokes	(Argentina) Silvia Bertolaccini
16	Jun 20, 1976	Hoosier Classic (2)	−6 (72-70-68=210)	2 strokes	(United States) Debbie Austin (United States) Pat Bradley
17	Jul 11, 1976	U.S. Women's Open (2)	+8 (71-71-77-73=292)	Playoff	(United States) Sandra Palmer
18	Jun 5, 1977	Talk Tournament '77	−4 (72-70-68-74=284)	5 strokes	(United States) Kathy McMullen
19	Jul 17, 1977	Borden Classic	−9 (66-70-71=207)	1 stroke	(United States) Pat Meyers
20	Sep 11, 1977	National Jewish Hospital Open	−6 (69-72-69=210)	2 strokes	(United States) Hollis Stacy
21	Jul 4, 1978	Peter Jackson Classic (2)	−14 (73-70-71-64=278)	8 strokes	(United States) Hollis Stacy
22	Jul 16, 1978	Borden Classic (2)	−7 (71-67-71=209	1 stroke	(United States) Betsy King (United States) Pat Bradley
23	Mar 18, 1979	Honda Civic Classic	−7 (72-71-69-69=281)	3 strokes	(United States) Pat Bradley (Canada) Sandra Post
24	Apr 1, 1979	Women's Kemper Open	+2 (72-71-72-71=286)	Playoff	(United States) Donna Caponi (Japan) Hisako Higuchi (United States) Nancy Lopez (Australia) Jan Stephenson
25	Feb 4, 1980	Whirlpool Championship of Deer Creek	−10 (69-71-69-73=282)	2 strokes	(Canada) Sandra Post
26	Feb 24, 1980	Bent Tree Ladies Classic	−8 (72-71-68-69=280)	1 stroke	(Canada) Sandra Post
27	Mar, 9, 1980	Sunstar Classic	−9 (69-71-67=207)	3 strokes	(United States) Debbie Massey (United States) Kathy Postlewait
28	Mar 16, 1980	Honda Civic Golf Classic (2)	−71-69-70-69=279)	4 strokes	(United States) Judy Rankin
29	Jun 22, 1980	Lady Keystone Open	−9 (67-69-71=207)	4 strokes	(United States) Jo Ann Washam
30	Feb 15, 1981	S&H Golf Classic (2)	−1 (69-74-72=215)	Playoff	(United States) Dot Germain
31	Jun 21, 1981	Lady Keystone Open (2)	−13 (68-69-66=203)	8 strokes	(United States) Martha Nause
32	Aug 30, 1981	Columbia Savings LPGA Classic (2)	−10 (70-70-67-71=278)	2 strokes	(United States) Janet Anderson (United States) Patty Sheehan (United States) Kathy Whitworth
33	Sep 7, 1981	Rail Charity Golf Classic	−11 (70-69-66=205)	2 strokes	(United States) Kyle O'Brien
34	Feb 7, 1982	Elizabeth Arden Classic (2)	−5 (70-70-71-72=283)	1 stroke	(United States) Jo Ann Washam
35	Jun 6, 1982	McDonald's Classic	−12 (68-73-68-67=276)	6 strokes	(United States) Sandra Haynie
36	Aug 22, 1982	Chevrolet World Championship of Women's Golf	−4 (72-70-71-71=284)	5 strokes	(Japan) Ayako Okamoto
37	Aug 29, 1982	Henredon Classic	−6 (70-71-69-72=282)	Playoff	(United States) Sandra Haynie
38	Sep 6, 1982	Rail Charity Golf Classic (2)	−14 (69-66-67=202)	6 strokes	(United States) Susie McAllister
39	Aug 21, 1983	Chevrolet World Championship of Women's Golf (2)	−6 (73-73-67-69=282)	2 strokes	(Japan) Ayako Okamoto
40	Sep 11, 1983	Portland Ping Championship (2)	−4 (72-70-70=212)	Playoff	(Sweden) Charlotte Montgomery
41	May 27, 1984	LPGA Corning Classic	−7 (71-69-71-70=281)	4 strokes	(Japan) Ayako Okamoto
42	Feb 3, 1985	Elizabeth Arden Classic (3)	−8 (70-66-74-70=280)	6 strokes	(United States) Jane Blalock
43	Sep 15, 1985	Safeco Classic	−9 (71-71-69-68=279)	2 strokes	(Australia) Jan Stephenson

^{1} Carner won the Burdine's Invitational as an amateur.

Note: Carner won the Peter Jackson Classic (which became the du Maurier Classic) twice before it became a major championship.

LPGA Tour playoff record (10–10)

No.	Year	Tournament	Opponent(s)	Result
1	1970	Wendell-West Open	(United States) Marilynn Smith	Won with bogey on first extra hole
2	1974	Bluegrass Invitational	(United States) Sandra Spuzich	Won with bogey on first extra hole
3	1975	Birmingham Classic	(United States) Maria Astrologes (United States) Judy Rankin	Astrolges won with birdie on first extra hole
4	1975	American Defender Classic	(United States) Judy Rankin	Won with par on first extra hole
5	1975	Peter Jackson Classic	(United States) Carol Mann	Won with birdie on second extra hole
6	1976	Orange Blossom Classic	(United States) Sandra Palmer	Won with par on fourth extra hole
7	1976	U.S. Women's Open	(United States) Sandra Palmer	Won an 18-hole playoff (Carner:76, Palmer.:78)
8	1976	Jerry Lewis Muscular Dystrophy Classic	(United States) Mary Lou Crocker (United States) Sandra Palmer (England) Michelle Walker	Palmer won with birdie on third extra hole Crocker and Walker eliminated by par on first hole
9	1978	Coca-Cola Classic	(United States) Nancy Lopez	Lost to par on first extra hole
10	1979	Women's Kemper Open	(United States) Donna Caponi (Japan) Chako Higuchi (United States) Nancy Lopez (Australia) Jan Stephenson	Won with par on second extra hole Caponi, Lopez, and Stephenson eliminated by par on first hole
11	1979	Florida Lady Citrus	(United States) Jane Blalock	Lost to par on second extra hole
12	1981	Elizabeth Arden Classic	(South Africa) Sally Little (United States) Judy Rankin	Little won with par on third extra hole Carner eliminated by par on second hole
13	1981	S&H Golf Classic	(United States) Dot Germain	Won with par on first extra hole
14	1982	Whirlpool Championship of Deer Creek	(United States) Hollis Stacy	Lost to birdie on fifth extra hole
15	1982	Henredon Classic	(United States) Sandra Haynie	Won with par on fifth extra hole
16	1983	McDonald's Kids Classic	(United States) Beth Daniel	Lost to birdie on first extra hole
17	1983	Portland Ping Championship	(Sweden) Charlotte Montgomery	Won with birdie on first extra hole
18	1986	Henredon Classic	(United States) Betsy King	Lost to par on second extra hole
19	1987	U.S. Women's Open	(England) Laura Davies (Japan) Ayako Okamoto	Davies won 18-hole playoff (Davies:71, Carner:73, Okamoto:74)
20	1993	HealthSouth Palm Beach Classic	(United States) Tammie Green	Lost to birdie on first extra hole

=== Other wins (6) ===
- 1975 Wills Qantas Australian Ladies Open
- 1977 LPGA National Team Championship (with Judy Rankin)
- 1978 Colgate Triple Crown Match-Play Championship
- 1979 Colgate Triple Crown
- 1982 JCPenney Mixed Team Classic (with John Mahaffey)
- 1996 Sprint Titleholders Senior Challenge

== Major championships ==
=== Wins (2) ===
Year	Championship	Winning score	Margin	Runner-up
1971	U.S. Women's Open	E (70-73-72-73=288)	7 strokes	(United States) Kathy Whitworth
1976	U.S. Women's Open	+8 (71-71-77-73=292)	Playoff^{1}	(United States) Sandra Palmer

^{1} In an 18-hole playoff, Carner 76, Palmer 78.

=== Results timeline ===
Tournament	1962	1970	1971	1972	1973	1974	1975	1976	1977	1978
LPGA Championship		T6	39	T12	T47	2	T9		T5	4
U.S. Women's Open	T15	T21	1	T29	T49	T4	T3	1	3	T2

Tournament	1979	1980	1981	1982	1983	1984	1985	1986	1987	1988	1989	1990
Nabisco Dinah Shore †	...	...	...	...	T4	T5	T26	T42	T47	T12	T2	T31
LPGA Championship	T6	T3	T5	2	T4	T56	CUT	T40	T28	T18	T54	DQ
U.S. Women's Open		T10	T6	T2	T2	T20	T48	T35	T2	T16	T17	18
du Maurier Classic		2	T7	T3	T2	5	T29	T14		CUT	T10	CUT

Tournament	1991	1992	1993	1994	1995	1996	1997	1998	1999	2000
Nabisco Dinah Shore	CUT	T17	T40	T48	CUT	T79	CUT	T18	CUT	
LPGA Championship	8	T2	T37	T26	T38		CUT	CUT	CUT	CUT
U.S. Women's Open	T11	T42	T11	T31	CUT	CUT	CUT			
du Maurier Classic	T69	CUT	T71	CUT	CUT		CUT	CUT	T53	CUT

Tournament	2001	2002	2003	2004	2005
Kraft Nabisco Championship †	DQ		CUT	T70	CUT
LPGA Championship		CUT	CUT	CUT	
U.S. Women's Open					
Women's British Open ^					

† The Kraft Nabisco Championship was the Nabisco Dinah Shore Championship through 1999. It became the Nabisco Championship in 2000 and adopted the Kraft Nabisco Championship name in 2002.
^The Women's British Open replaced the du Maurier Classic as an LPGA major in 2001.

Win
Top 10
Did not play

CUT = missed the half-way cut
DQ = disqualified
... = not yet a major
"T" = tied for place

=== Summary ===
Tournament	Wins	2nd	3rd	Top-5	Top-10	Top-25	Events	Cuts made
Kraft Nabisco Championship	0	1	0	3	3	6	21	14
LPGA Championship	0	3	1	8	12	14	32	23
U.S. Women's Open	2	4	2	9	11	19	28	25
du Maurier Classic	0	2	1	4	6	7	19	11
Totals	2	10	4	24	32	46	100	73

- Most consecutive cuts made – 37 (1962 U.S. Women's Open – 1985 Nabisco Dinah Shore)
- Longest streak of top-10s – 24 (1974 LPGA – 1984 Nabisco Dinah Shore)

== Team appearances ==
Amateur

- Curtis Cup (representing the United States): 1958 (tie), 1960 (winners), 1962 (winners), 1964 (winners)

Professional

- Handa Cup (representing the United States): 2006 (winners), 2007 (winners), 2008 (winners), 2009 (winners), 2010 (winners), 2011 (winners)
- Solheim Cup (representing the United States): 1994 (non-playing captain, winners)

== See also ==
- List of golfers with most LPGA Tour wins
