= Kathy Ahern =

American professional golfer (1949–1996)

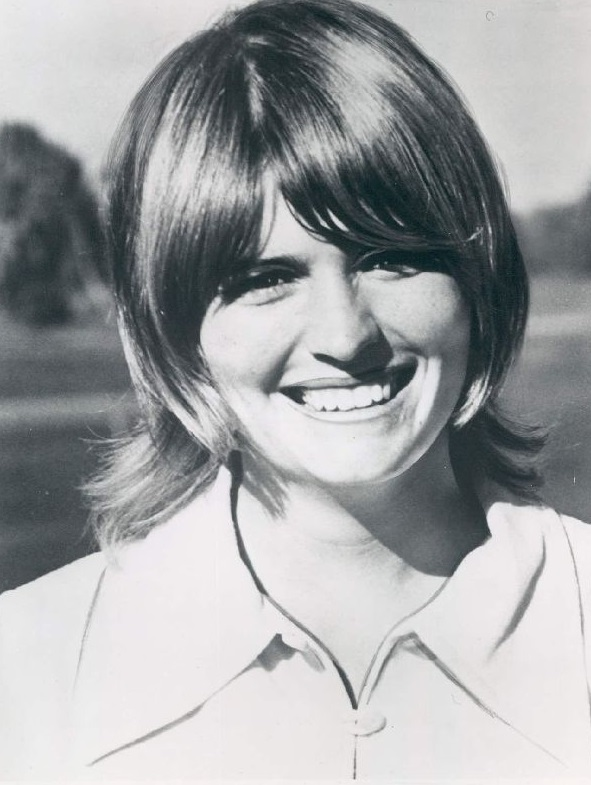
- Ahern in 1972

Personal information
- Full name: Kathy Ahern
- Nationality: United States
- Born: May 7, 1949 Pittsburgh, Pennsylvania, U.S.
- Died: July 6, 1996 (aged 47) Fountain Hills, Arizona, U.S.

Career
- Sport: Golf
- Turned professional: 1967
- Former tour: LPGA Tour
- Professional wins: 3

Number of wins by tour
- LPGA Tour: 3

Best results in LPGA major championships (wins: 1)
- Western Open: 24th: 1967
- Titleholders C'ship: DNP
- Chevron Championship: DNP
- Women's PGA C'ship: Won: 1972
- U.S. Women's Open: T2: 1972
- du Maurier Classic: DNP

Kathy Ahern (May 7, 1949 – July 6, 1996) was an American professional golfer on the LPGA Tour.

== Career ==
Born in Pittsburgh, Pennsylvania, Ahern was raised in Dallas, Texas, and won the Texas women's public links title at age 15 in 1964. She joined the LPGA Tour direct from high school in 1967 and won three events, including one major title, the LPGA Championship in 1972.

Ahern's first win came at the Southgate Ladies Open in August 1970, and the last at George Washington Classic in July 1972. She was also a runner-up at the U.S. Women's Open in 1972, the week before her final win. Ahern played little in the 1980s, but remained a presence around the tour and sometimes caddied for Sherri Turner.

== Death ==
After a five-year battle against breast cancer, Ahern died at age 47 at her mother's home in Fountain Hills, Arizona, northeast of Phoenix. At the time of her death, she was a resident of Greenville, South Carolina.

== Professional wins ==
=== LPGA Tour wins (3) ===
Legend
LPGA Tour major championships (1)
Other LPGA Tour (2)

| No. | Date | Tournament | Winning score | To par | Margin of victory | Runner-up |
|---|---|---|---|---|---|---|
| 1 | Aug 23, 1970 | Southgate Ladies Open | 72-72-67=211 | −5 | 3 strokes | (United States) Judy Rankin |
| 2 | Jun 11, 1972 | Eve-LPGA Championship | 75-73-76-69=293 | +1 | 6 strokes | (United States) Jane Blalock |
| 3 | Jul 9, 1972 | George Washington Classic | 78-68-67=213 | −6 | 1 stroke | (United States) Sandra Haynie |

== Major championships ==
=== Wins (1) ===
| Year | Championship | Winning score | Margin | Runner-up |
|---|---|---|---|---|
| 1972 | Eve-LPGA Championship | +1 (75-73-76-69=293) | 6 strokes | (United States) Jane Blalock |
