= 1980 Peter Jackson Classic =

Coordinates: 43.675°N 79.531°W

The 1980 Peter Jackson Classic was contested from August 7–10 at St. George's Golf and Country Club. It was the 8th edition of the Peter Jackson Classic, and the second edition as a major championship on the LPGA Tour.

This event was won by Pat Bradley.

== Final leaderboard ==
Place	Player	Score	To par	Money (US$)
1	(United States) Pat Bradley	65-72-69-71=277	−15	22,500
2	(United States) JoAnne Carner	70-68-71-69=278	−14	14,700
3	(United States) Donna Caponi	74-69-70-67=280	−12	10,500
4	(United States) Jane Blalock	69-70-71-71=281	−11	7,500
5	(United States) Beth Daniel	69-72-70-72=283	−9	6,000
T6	(United States) Nancy Lopez	72-72-68-73=285	−7	5,025
T6	(United States) Donna White	69-72-69-75=285	−7	5,025
T8	(United States) Dot Germain	74-69-74-72=289	−3	4,200
T8	(United States) Barbara Moxness	72-71-73-73=289	−3	4,200
T10	(United States) Amy Alcott	78-69-73-71=291	−1	3,300
T10	(South Africa) Sally Little	73-74-70-74=291	−1	3,300
T10	(United States) Sandra Palmer	74-76-69-72=291	−1	3,300
T10	(Canada) Sandra Post	77-73-69-72=291	−1	3,300
