= 1972 LPGA Championship =

Coordinates: 42.151°N 71.737°W

Tournament information
- Dates: June 8–11, 1972
- Location: Sutton, Massachusetts
- Course: Pleasant Valley Country Club
- Tour: LPGA Tour
- Format: Stroke play – 72 holes

Statistics
- Par: 73
- Length: 6,130 yards (5,605 m)
- Field: 82 players, 52 after cut
- Cut: 160 (+14)
- Prize fund: $50,000
- Winner's share: $7,500

Champion
- (United States) Kathy Ahern
- 293 (+1)

Location in the United States
Location in Massachusetts

The 1972 LPGA Championship was the 18th LPGA Championship, held June 8–11 at Pleasant Valley Country Club in Sutton, Massachusetts, southeast of Worcester.

Kathy Ahern shot a final round 69 (−4) to win her only major title, six strokes ahead of runner-up Jane Blalock. Ahern began the final round with a one-stroke lead over three players; after five straight birdies on the front nine, she had a six-stroke lead and shot even par on the final nine.

Three weeks later, Ahern was a runner-up by a stroke at the U.S. Women's Open at Winged Foot, then won the week after at the George Washington Classic near Philadelphia.

== Final leaderboard ==
Sunday, June 11, 1972

Place	Player	Score	To par	Money ($)
1	(United States) Kathy Ahern	75-73-76-69=293	+1	7,500
2	(United States) Jane Blalock	74-75-76-74=299	+7	5,400
T3	(United States) Marlene Hagge	77-74-80-70=301	+9	3,400
T3	(United States) Sharon Miller	74-72-79-76=301	+9	3,400
T5	(United States) Clifford Ann Creed	78-76-79-71=304	+12	2,155
T5	(United States) Marilynn Smith	75-76-76-77=304	+12	2,155
T7	(United States) Pam Barnett	74-75-82-74=305	+13	1,650
T7	(United States) Betty Burfeindt	74-75-80-76=305	+13	1,650
T7	(United States) Gloria Ehret	75-74-80-76=305	+13	1,650
T10	(United States) Debbie Austin	79-74-78-75=306	+14	1,350
T10	(United States) Susie Berning	80-72-79-75=306	+14	1,350
