= 1976 U.S. Women's Open =

Coordinates: 39.945°N 75.336°W

Tournament information
- Dates: July 8–12, 1976
- Location: Springfield, Pennsylvania
- Course: Rolling Green Golf Club
- Organized by: USGA
- Tour: LPGA Tour

Statistics
- Par: 71
- Length: 6,066 yards (5,547 m)
- Prize fund: $60,000
- Winner's share: $9,054

Champion
- (United States) JoAnne Carner
- 292 (+8), playoff

Location in the United States
Location in Pennsylvania

The 1976 U.S. Women's Open was the 31st U.S. Women's Open, held July 8–12 at Rolling Green Golf Club in Springfield, Pennsylvania, a suburb west of Philadelphia.

JoAnne Carner, the 1971 champion, won in a Monday playoff over defending champion Sandra Palmer by a score of 76 to 78. The two had tied at 292 (+8), four strokes ahead of Jane Blalock.

== Final leaderboard ==
Sunday, July 11, 1976

Place	Player	Score	To par	Money ($)
T1	(United States) JoAnne Carner	71-71-77-73=292	+8	Playoff
T1	(United States) Sandra Palmer	70-74-73-75=292	+8	Playoff
3	(United States) Jane Blalock	75-72-73-76=296	+12	3,454
4	(United States) Susie McAllister	76-78-70-73=297	+13	2,654
T5	(United States) Amy Alcott	72-75-78-74=299	+15	2,329
T5	(United States) Sharon Miller	75-75-77-72=299	+15	2,329
7	(Argentina) Silvia Bertolaccini	78-73-74-75=300	+16	2,054
T8	(United States) Susie Berning	73-76-79-75=303	+19	1,954
T8	(United States) Betsy King (a)	76-74-76-77=303	+19	0
T10	(United States) Carole Jo Callison	78-77-72-78=305	+21	1,854
T10	(United States) Carol Semple (a)	71-77-82-75=305	+21	0
T10	(United States) Debbie Massey (a)	75-74-74-82=305	+21	0

(a) = amateur

== Playoff ==
Monday, July 12, 1976

Place	Player	Score	To par	Money ($)
1	(United States) JoAnne Carner	76	+5	9,054
2	(United States) Sandra Palmer	78	+7	5,554
