= Birmingham Classic =

Birmingham Classic may refer to:

- Birmingham Classic (golf), Birmingham, Alabama
- Birmingham Classic (tennis), Birmingham, England
