= Kathy Hite =

American professional golfer (born 1948)

Personal information
- Full name: Kathy Hite-James
- Nationality: United States
- Born: September 8, 1948 Florence, South Carolina, U.S.
- Died: January 3, 2023 (aged 74) Palm Desert, California, U.S.
- Height: 5 ft 6 in (1.68 m)

Career
- Sport: Golf
- College: Winthrop University
- Status: Professional
- Former tours: LPGA Tour (1974–1987); ALPG Tour
- Professional wins: 1

Number of wins by tour
- LPGA Tour: 1

Best results in LPGA major championships
- Titleholders C'ship: 32nd: 1966
- Chevron Championship: T52: 1983
- Women's PGA C'ship: T25: 1979
- U.S. Women's Open: 38th: 1980
- du Maurier Classic: T19: 1984

Kathy Hite-James (September 8, 1948 – January 3, 2023) was an American professional golfer who played on the LPGA Tour.

Hite won once on the LPGA Tour in 1981.

Hite-James was inducted into the South Carolina Golf Hall of Fame in 2000 and the Winthrop Athletics Hall of Fame in 2007. She died in Palm Desert, California in 2023.

== Professional wins ==
=== LPGA Tour wins (1) ===
No.	Date	Tournament	Winning score	Margin of victory	Runner-up
1	May 24, 1981	Corning Classic	−6 (71-70-69-72=282)	1 stroke	(United States) JoAnne Carner
