= Judy Rankin =

American professional golfer and broadcaster (born 1945)

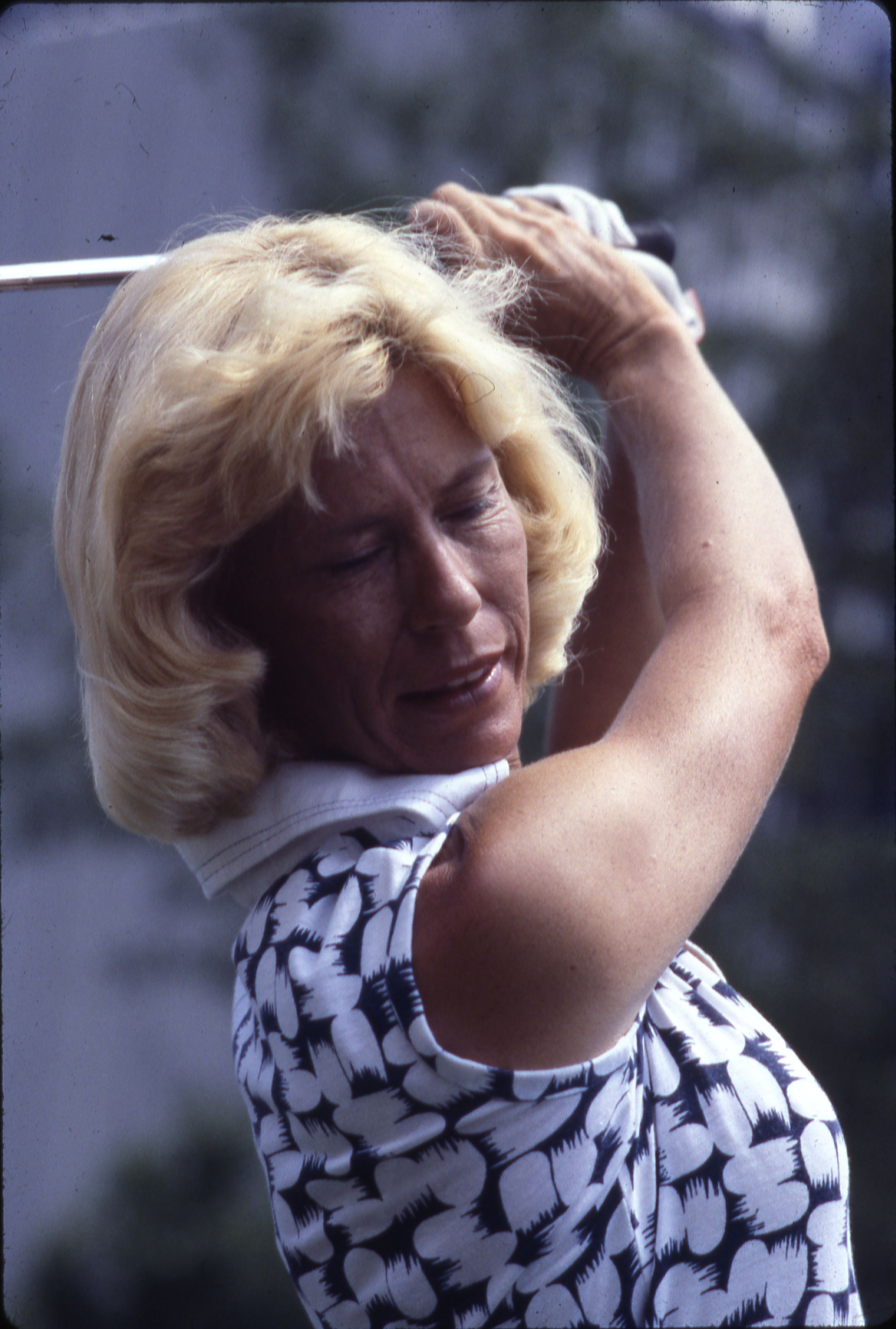
- Rankin in 1978

Personal information
- Full name: Judy Torluemke Rankin
- Nationality: United States
- Born: February 18, 1945 (age 81) St. Louis, Missouri, U.S.
- Height: 5 ft 3 in (1.60 m)
- Spouse: Walter "Yippy" Rankin (m. 1967–2012)
- Children: Walter "Tuey" Rankin, Jr.

Career
- Sport: Golf
- Turned professional: 1962
- Former tour: LPGA Tour
- Professional wins: 28

Number of wins by tour
- LPGA Tour: 26
- Other: 2

Best results in LPGA major championships
- Western Open: T4: 1964
- Titleholders C'ship: T2: 1972
- Chevron Championship: T44: 1983
- Women's PGA C'ship: 2nd/T2: 1976, 1977
- U.S. Women's Open: T2: 1972
- du Maurier Classic: T5: 1979

Achievements and awards
- World Golf Hall of Fame: 2000 (member page)
- LPGA Tour Money Winner: 1976, 1977
- LPGA Player of the Year: 1976, 1977
- LPGA Vare Trophy: 1973, 1976, 1977
- GWAA Female Player of the Year: 1976, 1977
- LPGA William and Mousie Powell Award: 1998
- LPGA Patty Berg Award: 1999
- USGA Bob Jones Award: 2002
- LPGA Komen Award: 2007
- Old Tom Morris Award: 2010

Judy Rankin (née Torluemke; born February 18, 1945) is an American professional golfer and golf broadcaster. A member of the World Golf Hall of Fame, she joined the LPGA Tour in 1962 at age 17 and won 26 tour events.

From 2010 through 2022, Rankin served as the lead analyst for LPGA Tour telecasts on the Golf Channel. She previously served as an expert analyst for golf coverage on ESPN and ABC.

== Early life and amateur career ==
In 1945, Rankin was born and raised in St. Louis, Missouri. In 1959, at the age of 14, she won the Missouri Amateur. The next year she was the low amateur at the U.S. Women's Open. In addition, she was on the cover of Sports Illustrated in 1961 at age 16.

== Professional career ==
In 1962, she turned professional. Rankin's first LPGA Tour win came in 1968 and she won 26 events, topping the money list in 1976 and 1977. She finished in the top ten on the money list eleven times between 1965 and 1979, and was the first to win over $100,000 in a season on the LPGA Tour (over $150,000 in 1976).

Rankin did not win a major championship but she was a four-time runner-up. Her best finishes were a solo second at the 1976 LPGA Championship and joint runner-up finishes at the 1972 Titleholders Championship, 1972 U.S. Women's Open, and 1977 LPGA Championship. Rankin also won the 1976 Colgate Dinah Shore Winner's Circle (currently the ANA Inspiration) and the 1977 Peter Jackson Classic (later renamed the du Maurier Classic); both events were later elevated to major status, but are not counted as majors in the years in which Rankin won. Her 26th and final win on tour was in August 1979 at Jericho, New York.

She retired from full-time competition at age 38 in 1983 due to chronic back problems, and later captained the victorious Solheim Cup teams in 1996 and 1998.

=== Broadcasting career ===
From 1984 until 2018, Rankin worked as a golf commentator for ESPN and ABC. In 2010, she became the lead LPGA analyst for the Golf Channel.

She has also been a professional advisor for the magazines Golf Digest and Golf For Women.

== Personal life ==
Rankin was known as Judy Torluemke (pronounced Tor-lum-kee), until her marriage to Walter "Yippy" Rankin in 1967. They lived in Midland, Texas and have a son, Walter Jr., known as "Tuey," born in 1968. After a battle with throat cancer, Yippy died at age 71 on February 24, 2012. Tuey's wife is the sister-in-law of PGA Tour golfer Geoff Ogilvy.

Rankin was diagnosed with breast cancer in May 2006. She completed treatment by August 2006 and returned to her on-air work on ABC Sports in time to cover the 2006 Women's British Open.

== Awards and honors ==
- In 1976 and 1977, Rankin was LPGA Player of the Year
- She won the Vare Trophy for the lowest scoring average three times: in 1973, 1976, and 1977
- In 2000, Rankin became the first player voted into the LPGA Hall of Fame under the veterans category,
- In 2000, she was also inducted into the World Golf Hall of Fame.
- In 2002, Rankin was voted the Bob Jones Award, the highest honor given by the United States Golf Association in recognition of distinguished sportsmanship in golf.
- In 2013, she was awarded a star on the St. Louis Walk of Fame.
- In 2024, she became the first woman to be awarded the PGA Lifetime Achievement Award in Journalism.

== Professional wins (28) ==
=== LPGA Tour wins (26) ===
No.	Date	Tournament	Winning score	Margin of victory	Runner(s)-up
1	Nov 10, 1968	Corpus Christi Civitan Open	+3 (75-69-69=213)	Playoff	(United States) Sandra Spuzich
2	Jun 27, 1970	George Washington Golf Classic	−7 (74-70-68=212)	1 stroke	(United States) Sandra Haynie
3	Jul 19, 1970	Springfield Jaycee Open	−10 (71-70-68=209)	1 stroke	(United States) Leslie Holbert
4	Sep 27, 1970	Lincoln-Mercury Open	−2 (69-71-77=217)	1 stroke	(United States) Kathy Whitworth
5	Oct 15, 1971	Quality First Classic	−2 (71-72-71=214)	Playoff	(United States) Jane Blalock
6	Mar 10, 1972	Lady Eve Open	−9 (69-71-70=210)	Playoff	(United States) Kathy Whitworth
7	Oct 10, 1972	Heritage Village Open	−7 (69-72-71=212)	5 strokes	(United States) Betty Burfeindt
8	May 6, 1973	American Defender-Raleigh Classic	+1 (73-72-72=217)	2 strokes	(Japan) Chako Higuchi
9	May 13, 1973	Lady Carling Open	−4 (75-67-73=215)	4 strokes	(United States) Sandra Haynie
10	Aug 5, 1973	Pabst Ladies Classic	−4 (69-71-72=212)	3 strokes	(United States) Debbie Austin
11	Oct 14, 1973	GAC Classic	−8 (69-67-70-66=272)	Playoff	(West Germany) Gerda Boykin (United States) Sandra Palmer
12	Jun 2, 1974	Baltimore Classic	−2 (71-73=144)	1 stroke	(United States) Susie Berning (United States) Carol Mann (United States) Marilynn Smith (United States) Kathy Whitworth
13	Aug 24, 1975	National Jewish Hospital Open	−9 (68-68-71=207)	2 strokes	(United States) Jane Blalock (United States) Sandra Haynie
14	Feb 1, 1976	Burdine's Invitational	−3 (73-69-71=213)	3 strokes	(United States) Pat Bradley
15	Apr 4, 1976	Colgate-Dinah Shore Winner's Circle	−3 (74-72-71-68=285)	3 strokes	(United States) Betty Burfeindt
16	Apr 18, 1976	Karsten-Ping Open	−11 (68-68-69=205)	7 strokes	(Canada) Sandra Post
17	Jun 27, 1976	Babe Zaharias Invitational	−1 (74-69-69-75=287)	1 stroke	(United States) Jane Blalock
18	Jul 18, 1976	Borden Classic	−11 (68-70-67=205)	5 strokes	(United States) Pat Bradley (United States) Hollis Stacy
19	Nov 20, 1976	Colgate-Hong Kong Open	Even (71-72-73=216)	3 strokes	(Japan) Chako Higuchi
20	Feb 20, 1977	Orange Blossom Classic	−8 (69-70-69=208)	5 strokes	(United States) Joyce Kazmierski
21	Feb 27, 1977	Bent Tree Classic	−7 (63-77-69=209)	4 strokes	(United States) Clifford Ann Creed
22	Jun 19, 1977	Mayflower Classic	−4 (68-72-72=212)	2 strokes	(United States) Jane Blalock
23	Jul 3, 1977	Peter Jackson Classic	−4 (72-66-74=212)	3 strokes	(United States) Pat Meyers (United States) Sandra Palmer
24	Aug 6, 1977	Colgate European Women's Open	−15 (69-71-71-70=281)	6 strokes	(United States) Nancy Lopez
25	Aug 13, 1978	WUI Classic	−9 (71-69-70-73=283)	2 strokes	(United States) Pam Higgins (United States) Debbie Massey
26	Aug 13, 1979	WUI Classic	−4 (76-71-71-70=288)	2 strokes	(United States) Beth Daniel

Note: Rankin won the Colgate-Dinah Shore Winner's Circle (now the Chevron Championship)
and the Peter Jackson Classic (later the du Maurier Classic) before they became major championships.

LPGA Tour playoff record (4–12)

No.	Year	Tournament	Opponent(s)	Result
1	1968	Corpus Christi Civitan Open	(United States) Sandra Spuzich	Won with par on second extra hole
2	1970	Women's Golf Charities Open	(United States) Sandra Haynie (United States) Marilynn Smith	Smith won with birdie on first extra hole
3	1971	Quality First Classic	(United States) Jane Blalock	Won with par on second extra hole
4	1972	Lady Eve Open	(United States) Kathy Whitworth	Won with eagle on first extra hole
5	1973	Sealy-Faberge Classic	(United States) Kathy Cornelius	Lost to par on first extra hole
6	1973	La Canadienne	(Canada) Jocelyne Bourassa (United States) Sandra Haynie	Bourassa won with birdie on third extra hole Rankin eliminated by par on first hole
7	1973	GAC Classic	(West Germany) Gerda Boykin (United States) Sandra Palmer	Won with par on third extra hole Boykin eliminated by par on first hole
8	1973	Corpus Christi Civitan Open	(United States) Sharon Miller	Lost to birdie on second extra hole
9	1975	Charity Golf Classic	(United States) Amy Alcott (United States) Sandra Haynie	Haynie won with par on fourth extra hole Rankin eliminated by par on first hole
10	1975	Birmingham Classic	(United States) Maria Astrologes (United States) JoAnne Carner	Astrologes won with birdie on first extra hole
11	1975	American Defender Classic	(United States) JoAnne Carner	Lost to par on first extra hole
12	1976	Girl Talk Classic	(United States) Pat Bradley (United States) Bonnie Lauer (Canada) Sandra Post	Bradley won with par on second extra hole Lauer and Post eliminated by birdie on first hole
13	1976	Peter Jackson Classic	(United States) Donna Caponi	Lost to par on first extra hole
14	1977	American Cancer Society Classic	(United States) Pam Higgins	Lost to par on first extra hole
15	1979	Mayflower Classic	(United States) Laura Baugh (United States) Hollis Stacy	Stacy won with par on second extra hole Rankin eliminated by par on first hole
16	1981	Elizabeth Arden Classic	(United States) JoAnne Carner (South Africa) Sally Little	Little won with par on third extra hole Carner eliminated by par on second hole

=== Other wins (2) ===
- 1974 (1) Colgate European Open
- 1977 (1) LPGA National Team Championship (with JoAnne Carner)

== See also ==
- List of golfers with most LPGA Tour wins
