= Janet Coles =

American professional golfer (born 1954)

Personal information
- Nationality: United States
- Born: August 4, 1954 (age 72) California, U.S.
- Height: 5 ft 6.5 in (1.69 m)

Career
- Sport: Golf
- College: UCLA
- Status: Professional
- Former tour: LPGA Tour (1977–1990)
- Professional wins: 2

Number of wins by tour
- LPGA Tour: 2

Best results in LPGA major championships
- Chevron Championship: T4: 1983
- Women's PGA C'ship: T11: 1983
- U.S. Women's Open: T4: 1985
- du Maurier Classic: T13: 1981

Janet Coles (born August 4, 1954) is an American professional golfer who played on the LPGA Tour.

== Career ==
Coles won twice on the LPGA Tour in 1978 and 1983.

On August 22, 2011, Coles was named head coach of the Dartmouth College women's golf team.

== Professional wins (2) ==
=== LPGA Tour wins (2) ===
No.	Date	Tournament	Winning score	Margin of victory	Runner(s)-up
1	Apr 30, 1978	Natural Light Lady Tara Classic	−8 (71-70-70=211)	Playoff	(United States) Gloria Ehret (United States) Hollis Stacy
2	May 8, 1983	Lady Michelob	−10 (67-70-69=206)	6 strokes	(Canada) Sandra Post

LPGA Tour playoff record (1–0)

No.	Year	Tournament	Opponents	Result
1	1978	Natural Light Lady Tara Classic	(United States) Gloria Ehret (United States) Hollis Stacy	Won with birdie on third extra hole Stacy eliminated by par on first hole
