= Babe Zaharias Invitational =

Golf tournament formerly on the LPGA Tour

The Babe Zaharias Invitational was a golf tournament on the LPGA Tour, played only in 1976. It was played at the Tanglewood Country Club in Chagrin Falls, Ohio. Judy Rankin won the event by one stroke over Jane Blalock.

== See also ==
- Babe Zaharias Open - an unrelated LPGA Tour event played in Texas from 1953 to 1967
