= 1982 LPGA Championship =

Coordinates: 39.349°N 84.278°W

Tournament information
- Dates: June 10–13, 1982
- Location: Mason, Ohio
- Courses: Jack Nicklaus Golf Center; Grizzly Course
- Tour: LPGA Tour
- Format: Stroke play - 72 holes

Statistics
- Par: 72
- Length: 6,298 yards (5,759 m)
- Cut: 151 (+7)
- Prize fund: $200,000
- Winner's share: $30,000

Champion
- (Australia) Jan Stephenson
- 279 (−9)

Location in the United States
Location in Ohio

The 1982 LPGA Championship was the 28th LPGA Championship, played June 10–13 at Jack Nicklaus Golf Center at Kings Island in Mason, Ohio, a suburb northeast of Cincinnati.

Jan Stephenson led wire-to-wire to win the second of her three major titles, two strokes ahead of JoAnne Carner. She entered the final round with a two-stroke lead over Beth Daniel.

== Final leaderboard ==
Sunday, June 13, 1982

Place	Player	Score	To par	Money ($)
1	(Australia) Jan Stephenson	69-69-70-71=279	−9	30,000
2	(United States) JoAnne Carner	71-70-71-69=281	−7	19,600
T3	(United States) Janet Anderson	72-72-72-67=283	−5	12,000
T3	(United States) Pam Gietzen	72-69-71-71=283	−5	12,000
T5	(United States) Amy Alcott	74-68-72-70=284	−4	7,500
T5	(United States) Kathryn Young-Robyn	72-74-70-68=284	−4	7,500
T7	(United States) Beth Daniel	69-70-71-75=285	−3	5,867
T7	(United States) Sandra Haynie	73-69-73-70=285	−3	5,867
T7	(United States) Hollis Stacy	73-70-69-73=285	−3	5,867
T10	(South Africa) Sally Little	71-73-71-71=286	−2	4,800
T10	(United States) Sandra Palmer	70-70-74-72=286	−2	4,800
