= 1972 Titleholders Championship =

Golf tournament in North Carolina, US

Tournament information
- Dates: May 26–29, 1972
- Location: Southern Pines, North Carolina; 35.1970°N 79.3921°W
- Course: Pine Needles Lodge and Golf Club
- Tour: LPGA Tour
- Format: Stroke play – 72 holes

Statistics
- Par: 71
- Length: 6,432 yards (5,881 m)
- Prize fund: $20,000
- Winner's share: $3,000

Champion
- (United States) Sandra Palmer
- 283 (−1)
- Location in the United States Location in North Carolina

The 1972 Titleholders Championship was contested from May 26–29 at Pine Needles Lodge and Golf Club in Southern Pines, North Carolina. It was the 28th and final edition of the Titleholders Championship, following a six-year hiatus. It was the only edition not played at the Augusta Country Club.

The event was won by Sandra Palmer.

== Final leaderboard ==
Place	Player	Score	To par	Money ($)
1	(United States) Sandra Palmer	71-68-72-72=283	−1	3,000
T2	(United States) Judy Rankin	73-74-70-76=293	+9	2,032
T2	(United States) Mickey Wright	73-73-70-77=293	+9	2,032
T4	(United States) Marlene Hagge	72-77-72-73=294	+10	1,337
T4	(United States) Kathy Whitworth	78-69-77-70=294	+10	1,337
6	(United States) Marilynn Smith	72-70-74-80=296	+12	1,000
T7	(United States) Jane Blalock	72-76-76-74=298	+14	800
T7	(United States) Carol Mann	78-72-74-74=298	+14	800
9	(United States) Clifford Ann Creed	79-72-73-76=300	+16	655
T10	(United States) JoAnne Carner	78-76-72-76=302	+18	555
T10	(United States) Peggy Wilson	74-75-74-79=302	+18	555
