= 1971 U.S. Women's Open =

Coordinates: 42.055°N 80.210°W

Tournament information
- Dates: June 24–27, 1971
- Location: Erie, Pennsylvania
- Course: Kahkwa Club
- Organized by: USGA
- Tour: LPGA Tour
- Format: Stroke play – 72 holes

Statistics
- Par: 72
- Length: 6,306 yards (5,766 m)
- Field: 134, 53 after cut
- Cut: 159 (+15)
- Prize fund: $31,000
- Winner's share: $5,000

Champion
- (United States) JoAnne Carner
- 288 (E)

Location in the United States
Location in Pennsylvania

The 1971 U.S. Women's Open was the 26th U.S. Women's Open, held June 24–27 at Kahkwa Club in Erie, Pennsylvania.

JoAnne Carner won the first of her two U.S. Women's Open titles, seven strokes ahead of runner-up Kathy Whitworth. Carner led (or co-led) wire-to-wire and entered the final round with a five-stroke lead over 1963 champion Mary Mills. The course was designed by Donald Ross.

== Final leaderboard ==
Sunday, June 27, 1971

Place	Player	Score	To par	Money ($)
1	(United States) JoAnne Carner	70-73-72-73=288	E	5,000
2	(United States) Kathy Whitworth	73-77-73-72=295	+7	2,500
T3	(United States) Jane Booth (a)	72-77-76-74=299	+11	0
T3	(United States) Jane Blalock	75-73-74-77=299	+11	1,233
T3	(United States) Donna Caponi	70-75-77-77=299	+11	1,233
T3	(United States) Mickey Wright	73-75-75-76=299	+11	1,233
T7	(United States) Kathy Cornelius	73-78-73-76=300	+12	875
T7	(United States) Lesley Holbert	71-75-81-73=300	+12	875
T9	(United States) Martha Kirouac (a)	74-78-77-72=301	+13	0
T9	(United States) Shelley Hamlin (a)	77-76-73-75=301	+13	0
