= Beth Solomon =

American professional golfer (born 1952)

Personal information
- Nationality: United States
- Born: October 29, 1952 (age 74)
- Height: 5 ft 8 in (1.73 m)

Career
- Sport: Golf
- College: Furman University
- Status: Professional
- Former tour: LPGA Tour (1975–1987)
- Professional wins: 1

Number of wins by tour
- LPGA Tour: 1

Best results in LPGA major championships
- Chevron Championship: T4: 1985
- Women's PGA C'ship: T22: 1977
- U.S. Women's Open: T34: 1978
- du Maurier Classic: T18: 1980

Beth Solomon (born October 29, 1952) is an American professional golfer who played on the LPGA Tour.

== Career ==
Solomon won once on the LPGA Tour in 1981.

== Professional wins (1) ==
=== LPGA Tour wins (1) ===
No.	Date	Tournament	Winning score	Margin of victory	Runner-up
1	Apr 26, 1981	Birmingham Classic	−10 (67-71-68=206)	Playoff	(United States) Jane Blalock

LPGA Tour playoff record (1–0)

No.	Year	Tournament	Opponent	Result
1	1981	Birmingham Classic	(United States) Jane Blalock	Won with par on third extra hole
