= The Sarah Coventry =

Golf tournament formerly on the LPGA Tour

The Sarah Coventry was a women's professional golf tournament on the LPGA Tour from 1976 to 1981. The inaugural event was played in Florida at the Lely Country Club in Naples in February 1976, then moved to northern California and the Round Hill Country Club in Alamo in September for two years, 1977 and 1978. It relocated to western New York in 1979 and was renamed the Rochester International in 1982; it later became the Wegman's LPGA, played through 2009, until replaced by the Wegman's LPGA Championship.

== Tournament names ==
- 1976: Sarah Coventry Naples Classic (Florida)
- 1977–1978: The Sarah Coventry (California)
- 1979–1981: The Sarah Coventry (New York, included in Wegman's LPGA records)

== Winners ==
Year	Dates	Champion	Country	Score	To par	Purse ($)	Winner's share ($)
1981	Jun 25–28	Nancy Lopez (2)	United States	285	–7	125,000	18,750
1980	Jun 26–29	Nancy Lopez	United States	283	–9	125,000	18,750
1979	Jun 14–17	Jane Blalock (2)	United States	280	–12	100,000	15,000
1978	Sep 14–17	Donna Caponi	United States	282	–10	100,000	15,000
1977	Sep 22–25	Jane Blalock	United States	282	–10	100,000	15,000
1976	Feb 6–8	Jan Stephenson	Australia	218	+2	60,000	8,500

== Wegmans LPGA ==
After 1978, the tournament relocated from California to New York and was played at the Locust Hill Country Club near Rochester from 1979 to 1981. In 1979, the tournament recognized the 1976–78 tournaments as its predecessors, and not the Bankers Trust Classic which had been played at Locust Hill in 1977 and 1978. Today however the Wegmans LPGA recognizes the Bankers Trust Classics and not the first three Sarah Coventry events as part of the tournament's history. The change gave Nancy Lopez three wins in the event, as she won the Bankers Trust Classic at Locust Hill in 1978.

== See also ==
- Naples Lely Classic, another LPGA Tour event played at Lely Country Club from 1973 to 1975.
