= Jan Stephenson =

Australian professional golfer (born 1951)

Personal information
- Full name: Jan Lynn Stephenson
- Nationality: Australia
- Born: 22 December 1951 (age 74) Sydney, New South Wales, Australia
- Height: 5 ft 5 in (1.65 m)

Career
- Sport: Golf
- College: Hales College
- Turned professional: 1973
- Former tours: LPGA Tour (joined 1974); ALPG Tour (joined 1973)
- Professional wins: 27

Number of wins by tour
- LPGA Tour: 16
- Ladies European Tour: 1
- LPGA of Japan Tour: 2
- WPGA Tour of Australasia: 2
- Other: 6

Best results in LPGA major championships (wins: 3)
- Chevron Championship: 2nd: 1985
- Women's PGA C'ship: Won: 1982
- U.S. Women's Open: Won: 1983
- du Maurier Classic: Won: 1981
- Women's British Open: DNP

Achievements and awards
- World Golf Hall of Fame: 2019 (member page)
- LPGA Tour Rookie of the Year: 1974

Jan Lynn Stephenson (born 22 December 1951) is an Australian professional golfer. She became a member of the LPGA Tour in 1974 and won three major championships and 16 LPGA Tour events. She has 41 worldwide victories including (10) LPGA Legends Tour wins and 8 worldwide major championships. She has 15 holes-in-one with nine in competition. She was elected to the World Golf Hall of Fame, class of 2019.

== Early life and amateur career ==
Stephenson was born on 22 December 1951 in Sydney. While a teenager, she won five consecutive New South Wales Schoolgirl Championships in Australia, beginning in 1964, and followed that up with three straight wins in the New South Wales Junior Championship.

== Professional career ==
In 1973, Stephenson turned professional. She won the Wills Australian Ladies Open that year. She joined the LPGA Tour in 1974 and was named LPGA Rookie of the Year.

Stephenson's first LPGA victory was the 1976 Sarah Coventry Naples Classic. Her most productive period was the early 1980s, when she won all of her majors in consecutive years: 1981 Peter Jackson Classic, the 1982 LPGA Championship and the 1983 U.S. Women's Open.

Stephenson was one of the first LPGA stars to openly embrace and champion a sex-sells approach to marketing. Stephenson became as famous for her sex appeal as her golf during the early to mid-1980s, when she posed in a bathtub – covered up only by the golf balls filling the tub – and later in a pinup calendar. She urged the LPGA Tour to fully embrace her approach to marketing.

On the golf course, Stephenson won three times each in 1981, 1983 and 1987, those wins in 1987 being her final ones on the LPGA. Stephenson continued playing LPGA events throughout the 1990s, but was hampered by an injury incurred during a mugging in Miami in 1990. Her left ring finger was broken in two places, an injury that still bothers her play in cold or wet weather.

Stephenson went on to win on the Women's Senior Golf Tour, a tour she helped found. In 2003, she became the first woman to play on the Champions Tour at the Turtle Bay Championship, where she finished in last place. Stephenson is among the few women in the course design business, and produced an exercise video for people with arthritis. Her many charitable efforts include being an honorary chairman of the National Multiple Sclerosis Society.

Stephenson is an Ambassador for blind and disabled golf through ISPS Handa and has acquired Tarpon Woods Golf Club in Palm Harbor through her Foundation (Jan Stephenson's Crossroads Foundation) www.jscrossroads.com. The golf course provides initiatives for blind/disabled and wounded veterans and first responders. Her mission is, "Giving to Those that have Given so Much". She has been recognised for her philanthropic work by the Government of Australia and other charitable organisations. She was awarded recognition by the Military Order of the Purple Heart in October 2017 for her service to combat wounded/disabled/blind veterans and first responders. Her Foundation was awarded the Charity of the Year by the Palm Harbor Chamber of Commerce in September 2018.

== Controversy ==
Stephenson made a controversial remark in 2003 when she said "Asians are killing the (LPGA) Tour", referring to the large number of Korean-born players who were winning on tour, and calling for quotas on international players – although she was also an international player she believed that the LPGA should focus on American players. She later apologised, saying that she "did not intend to make it a racial issue."

== Personal life ==
Stephenson was briefly married to Sydney business man Gilbert Thomas in her young adulthood.

She was a contestant in the 2011 season of Dancing with the Stars on Channel Seven.

== Awards and honours ==
- In 1974, Stephenson earned LPGA Rookie of the Year honors.
- In 1985, she was inducted into the Sport Australia Hall of Fame.
- In the 2018 Australia Day Honours, Stephenson was awarded a Medal of the Order of Australia (OAM) "for service to golf, and to not-for-profit organisations."
- In 2019, she was elected to the World Golf Hall of Fame.

== Professional wins (27) ==
=== LPGA Tour (16) ===
Legend
LPGA Tour major championships (3)
Other LPGA Tour (13)

No.	Date	Tournament	Winning score	Margin of victory	Runner(s)-up
1	8 Feb 1976	Sarah Coventry Naples Classic	+2 (73-69-76=218)	1 stroke	(United States) Sandra Haynie (United States) Judy Meister
2	25 Apr 1976	Birmingham Classic	−13 (65-70-68=203)	4 strokes	(United States) Kathy Martin
3	8 May 1978	Women's International	−5 (68-72-69-74=283)	4 strokes	(United States) Beth Daniel (a)
4	2 Mar 1980	Sun City Classic	−13 (66-71-67-71=275)	1 stroke	(New Zealand) M.J. Smith
5	5 Jul 1981	Peter Jackson Classic	−10 (69-66-70-73=278)	1 stroke	(United States) Pat Bradley (United States) Nancy Lopez
6	16 Aug 1981	Mary Kay Classic	−18 (65-69-64=198)	11 strokes	(United States) Sandra Haynie
7	13 Sep 1981	United Virginia Bank Classic	−14 (66-71-68=205)	3 strokes	(United States) Janet Alex (South Africa) Sally Little
8	13 Jun 1982	LPGA Championship	−9 (69-69-70-71=279)	2 strokes	(United States) JoAnne Carner
9	20 Jun 1982	Lady Keystone Open	−5 (71-71-69=211)	1 stroke	(United States) Barbara Moxness (United States) Alexandra Reinhardt
10	27 Feb 1983	Tucson Conquistadores LPGA Open	−9 (72-68-67=207)	5 strokes	(United States) Amy Alcott
11	19 Jun 1983	Lady Keystone Open	−11 (69-67-69=205)	1 stroke	(United States) Pat Bradley
12	31 Jul 1983	U.S. Women's Open	+6 (72-73-71-74=290)	1 stroke	(United States) JoAnne Carner (United States) Patty Sheehan
13	24 Mar 1985	GNA Classic	+2 (70-73-72-75=290)	1 stroke	(United States) Amy Alcott (United States) Pat Bradley (United States) Barbara Moxness
14	19 Apr 1987	Santa Barbara Open	−1 (74-68-73=215)	1 stroke	(United States) Jane Geddes (Japan) Ayako Okamoto
15	20 Sep 1987	Safeco Classic	−11 (68-70-71-68=277)	1 stroke	(United States) Nancy Lopez
16	27 Sep 1987	Konica San Jose Classic	−11 (69-71-65=205)	5 strokes	(United States) Amy Alcott

LPGA Tour playoff record (0–4)

No.	Year	Tournament	Opponent(s)	Result
1	1979	Women's Kemper Open	(United States) Donna Caponi (United States) JoAnne Carner (Japan) Chako Higuchi (United States) Nancy Lopez	Carner won with par on second extra hole Caponi, Lopez, and Stephenson eliminated by par on first hole
2	1981	Inamori Classic	(United States) Amy Alcott (United States) Donna Caponi (United States) Hollis Stacy	Stacy won with birdie on first extra hole
3	1986	Mayflower Classic	(United States) Christa Johnson (United States) Sandra Palmer	Palmer won with birdie on first extra hole
4	1999	Firstar LPGA Classic	(United States) Becky Iverson (United States) Rosie Jones	Jones won with par on fourth extra hole Stephenson eliminated by par on first hole

=== ALPG Tour (2) ===
- 1973 (1) Wills Australian Ladies Open
- 1977 (1) Wills Qantas Australian Ladies Open

=== Ladies European Tour (1) ===
- 1985 (1) Hennessy Cognac Ladies Cup

=== LPGA of Japan Tour (2) ===
- 1981 (1) World Ladies
- 1985 (1) Nichirei Ladies Cup

=== Legends Tour (4) ===
- 2000 HyVee Classic
- 2005 BJ's Charity Championship (with Cindy Rarick; tie with Pat Bradley and Patty Sheehan)
- 2007 Handa Australia Cup
- 2021 BJ's Charity Championship (with Laura Diaz)

=== Other (2) ===
- 1983 JCPenney Mixed Team Classic (with Fred Couples)
- 1990 JCPenney/LPGA Skins Game

== Major championships ==
=== Wins (3) ===
Year	Championship	Winning score	Margin	Runner(s)-up
1981	Peter Jackson Classic	−10 (69-66-70-73=278)	1 stroke	(United States) Pat Bradley, (United States) Nancy Lopez-Melton
1982	LPGA Championship	−9 (69-69-70-71=279)	2 strokes	(United States) JoAnne Carner
1983	U.S. Women's Open	+6 (72-73-71-74=290)	1 stroke	(United States) JoAnne Carner, (United States) Patty Sheehan

== Team appearances ==
Amateur

- Tasman Cup (representing Australia): 1970 (winners)

Professional

- Handa Cup (representing World team): 2006, 2007, 2008, 2009, 2010, 2012 (tie), 2013 (winners), 2015

== See also ==
- List of golfers with most LPGA Tour wins
- List of golfers with most LPGA major championship wins
