= Kris Monaghan =

American professional golfer (born 1960)

Personal information
- Nationality: United States
- Born: August 24, 1960 (age 66) Spokane, Washington, U.S.
- Height: 5 ft 6 in (1.68 m)

Career
- Sport: Golf
- College: University of Oklahoma; University of New Mexico; Eastern Washington University
- Status: Professional
- Former tour: LPGA Tour (1985–1999)
- Professional wins: 2

Number of wins by tour
- LPGA Tour: 2

Best results in LPGA major championships
- Chevron Championship: T15: 1994
- Women's PGA C'ship: T17: 1994
- U.S. Women's Open: T25: 1992
- du Maurier Classic: T5: 1993

Kris Monaghan (born August 24, 1960) is an American professional golfer who played on the LPGA Tour.

Monaghan won twice on the LPGA Tour: in 1990 and 1993.

== Professional wins ==
=== LPGA Tour wins (2) ===
No.	Date	Tournament	Winning score	Margin of victory	Runner-up
1	Apr 8, 1990	Red Robin Kyocera Inamori Classic	–8 (72-67-70-67=276)	2 strokes	(United States) Cathy Gerring
2	Sep 26, 1993	Kyocera Inamori Classic	–13 (66-69-69-71=275)	1 stroke	(United States) Juli Inkster
