= Maria Astrologes =

American professional golfer (born 1951)

Personal information
- Full name: Maria Elana Astrologes Combs
- Nationality: United States
- Born: August 10, 1951 (age 75) Valparaiso, Indiana, U.S.

Career
- Sport: Golf
- College: San Fernando Valley State College; University of New Mexico
- Status: Professional
- Former tour: LPGA Tour (1972–1979)
- Professional wins: 1

Number of wins by tour
- LPGA Tour: 1

Best results in LPGA major championships
- Chevron Championship: CUT: 1985
- Women's PGA C'ship: T33: 1976
- U.S. Women's Open: T12: 1975
- du Maurier Classic: DNP

Maria Elana Astrologes Combs (born August 10, 1951) is an American professional golfer who played on the LPGA Tour. She played under her maiden name, Maria Astrologes, until her marriage in 1979.

Astrologes won once on the LPGA Tour in 1975.

== Professional wins ==
=== LPGA Tour wins (1) ===
No.	Date	Tournament	Winning score	Margin of victory	Runners-up
1	May 4, 1975	Birmingham Classic	−6 (66-74-70=210)	Playoff	(United States) JoAnne Carner (United States) Judy Rankin

LPGA Tour playoff record (1–0)

No.	Year	Tournament	Opponents	Result
1	1975	Birmingham Classic	(United States) JoAnne Carner (United States) Judy Rankin	Won with birdie on first extra hole
