= The Carlton (LPGA Tour) =

Golf tournament formerly on the LPGA Tour

The Carlton was a golf tournament on the LPGA Tour played in 1976 and 1978. It was played at the Calabasas Country Club in Calabasas, California.

== Winners ==
Golden Lights Championship

- 1978 Jane Blalock

The Carlton

- 1976 Donna Caponi

== See also ==
- Golden Lights Championship, another LPGA Tour event, played from 1978 to 1981, in New York and Connecticut
