= Cathy Reynolds =

American professional golfer (born 1957)

Personal information
- Nationality: United States
- Born: July 19, 1957 (age 69) Kansas City, Missouri, U.S.
- Height: 5 ft 8 in (1.73 m)

Career
- Sport: Golf
- College: University of Tulsa
- Status: Professional
- Former tour: LPGA Tour (1978–1994)
- Professional wins: 1

Number of wins by tour
- LPGA Tour: 1

Best results in LPGA major championships
- Chevron Championship: T17: 1986
- Women's PGA C'ship: T12: 1981
- U.S. Women's Open: T42: 1977
- du Maurier Classic: T15: 1989

Cathy Reynolds (born July 19, 1957) is an American professional golfer who played on the LPGA Tour.

== Career ==
Reynolds won once on the LPGA Tour in 1981.

== Professional wins ==
=== LPGA Tour wins (1) ===
No.	Date	Tournament	Winning score	Margin of victory	Runner-up
1	May 31, 1981	Golden Lights Championship	−3 (70-71-72-72=285)	2 strokes	(United States) Betsy King
