= S&H Green Stamp Classic =

Golf tournament formerly on the LPGA Tour

The S&H Green Stamp Classic was a golf tournament on the LPGA Tour from 1972 to 1974. It was played at the Memorial Golf Course in 1972 and the Westwood Country Club in Houston, Texas in 1973 and 1974.

Judy Rankin won the 1972 tournament on the first hole of a sudden-death playoff with Kathy Whitworth. To get in the playoff, Rankin eagled the 72nd hole. Then Rankin made eagle on the first playoff hole to get the victory.

== Winners ==
S&H Green Stamp Classic

- 1974 Carol Mann
- 1973 Kathy Whitworth

Lady Eve Open

- 1972 Judy Rankin
