= Sandra Post =

Canadian professional golfer (born 1948)

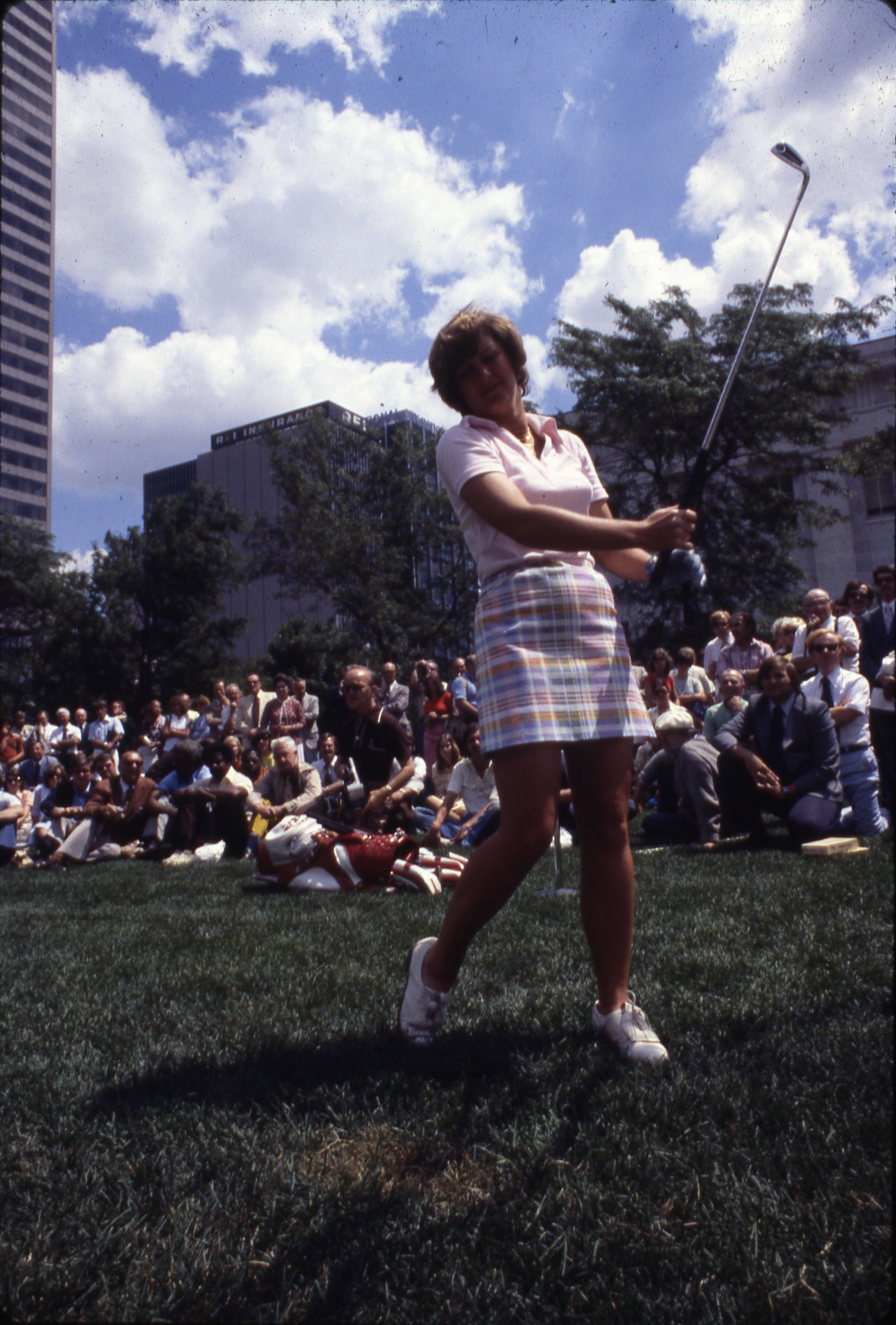
- Post in 1978

Personal information
- Full name: Sandra Post
- Nationality: Canada
- Born: June 4, 1948 (age 78) Oakville, Ontario
- Height: 5 ft 4 in (1.63 m)
- Spouses: John Elliot, Jr. (m. 1970; died 1971) John McDermid (m. 1992; died 2008)

Career
- Sport: Golf
- Turned professional: 1968
- Former tour: LPGA Tour (1968–1983)
- Professional wins: 10

Number of wins by tour
- LPGA Tour: 8
- LPGA of Japan Tour: 1
- Other: 1

Best results in LPGA major championships (wins: 1)
- Titleholders C'ship: DNP
- Chevron Championship: T62: 1983
- Women's PGA C'ship: Won: 1968
- U.S. Women's Open: T2: 1975
- du Maurier Classic: T7: 1979

Achievements and awards
- LPGA Tour Rookie of the Year: 1968

Sandra Post, CM (born June 4, 1948) is a retired professional golfer, the first Canadian to play on the LPGA Tour. In 1968 at age 20 in her rookie professional year, she won a women's major – the LPGA Championship, and was the youngest player at the time to win a major.

Over her 16 year career on the LPGA Tour, Post won eight championships and became the first Canadian to win multiple times in the same season, doing so twice in each of 1978 and 1979. The next time a two-win season by a Canadian occurred was in 2000 by Lorie Kane. In 1988, Post was named to both the Canadian Golf Hall of Fame and the Canadian Sports Hall of Fame. In 2004, she was inducted into the Order of Canada as a Member with the designation, CM.

== Early years ==
Born in Oakville, Ontario, Post was introduced to golf at age five by her father, and was a youthful prodigy who learned her golf at the nearby Trafalgar Golf & Country Club. She was competing in Ontario provincial events by age 13 and compiled an outstanding junior and amateur career that included winning the Ontario and Canadian Junior Girls Championships three times each.

== Professional career ==
=== Wins major, LPGA Rookie of the Year ===
Bypassing college, Post turned professional in the spring of 1968 and joined the LPGA Tour at age 19. In her debut season of 1968, Post became the youngest player to win a women's major title at the LPGA Championship. Her 18-hole playoff victory over defending champion Kathy Whitworth, by 68 to 75, also marked the first victory in the championship by a non-U.S. player. She was the only Canadian to win an LPGA major for 48 years, until 18-year-old Brooke Henderson in 2016.

For her performance on the professional circuit, Post was voted the Tour's Rookie of the Year award. Post did not return to the winner's circle on the Tour until 1978; however, she challenged to win on many occasions during that ten-year period. In December 1974, she won the Colgate Far East Open, a non-tour event in Melbourne, Australia.

=== Second on 1979 money list ===
Post hit her peak form from 1978 to 1981, winning seven of her eight career titles, and became one of the world's top players. She captured back-to-back wins at the Colgate-Dinah Shore Winner's Circle in 1978 and 1979.

For the 1979 season, she finished second on the LPGA money list, and won the Lou Marsh Trophy as Canada's "Athlete of the Year." During her 16 years on the pro tour, Post also had 20 runner-up finishes, including the U.S. Women's Open in 1975.

== Honors ==
Several nagging injuries led Post to retire from most LPGA competition by the mid-1980s, but she competed occasionally after that. In 1988, she was elected to the Canada's Sports Hall of Fame and the Canadian Golf Hall of Fame. In 1999, she was inducted into the Ontario Sports Hall of Fame. In 2003, she was honored by her country with membership in the Order of Canada. She was voted No. 8 of the females chosen as Canada's Athletes of the 20th Century.

Post has captained Canada's Nations Cup team, serves as a commentator on televised golf events in Canada, and writes golf instructional articles for several Canadian magazines. She is involved in a number of charitable causes, and runs the Sandra Post School of Golf near Toronto. Post has her own golf apparel firm, and has designed a set of women's golf clubs for the Jazz Golf company.

== Professional wins ==
=== LPGA Tour wins (8) ===
Legend
LPGA Tour major championships (1)
Other LPGA Tour (7)

No.	Date	Tournament	Winning score	To par	Margin of victory	Runner(s)-up
1	Jun 23, 1968	LPGA Championship	72-75-74-73=294	+2	Playoff	(United States) Kathy Whitworth
2	Apr 2, 1978	Colgate-Dinah Shore Winner's Circle	65-74-72-72=283	–5	Playoff	(Australia) Penny Pulz
3	Aug 20, 1978	Lady Stroh's Open	69-71-71-75=286	–2	Playoff	(United States) Pat Meyers (United States) Kathy Whitworth
4	Apr 8, 1979	Colgate-Dinah Shore Winner's Circle (2)	68-70-68-70=276	–12	1 stroke	(United States) Nancy Lopez
5	May 13, 1979	Lady Michelob	72-69-69=210	–9	2 strokes	(United States) Pat Bradley
6	Sep 23, 1979	ERA Real Estate Classic	71-73-70-70=284	–8	2 strokes	(United States) Donna Caponi
7	Aug 3, 1980	West Virginia LPGA Classic	69-69-73=211	–5	Playoff	(United States) Donna Caponi
8	Jun 7, 1981	McDonald's Kids Classic	69-69-73-71=282	–6	2 strokes	(United States) Amy Alcott

Note: Post's wins in the Colgate-Dinah Shore Winner's Circle (now Chevron Championship) were before it became a major championship.

LPGA Tour playoff record (4–2)
No.	Year	Tournament	Opponent(s)	Result
1	1968	LPGA Championship	(United States) Kathy Whitworth	Won 18-hole playoff (Post:68, Whitworth:75)
2	1976	Girl Talk Classic	(United States) Pat Bradley (United States) Bonnie Lauer (United States) Judy Rankin	Bradley won with par on second extra hole Lauer and Post eliminated by birdie on first hole
3	1978	Colgate-Dinah Shore Winner's Circle	(Australia) Penny Pulz	Won with par on second extra hole
4	1978	Lady Stroh's Open	(United States) Pat Meyers (United States) Kathy Whitworth	Won with birdie on second extra hole
5	1979	Elizabeth Arden Classic	(United States) Amy Alcott	Lost to eagle on third extra hole
6	1980	West Virginia LPGA Classic	(United States) Donna Caponi	Won with birdie on third extra hole

=== LPGA of Japan Tour wins (1) ===
- 1976 Sun Star Ladies

=== Other wins (1) ===
- 1974 Colgate Far East Open

== Major championships ==
=== Wins (1) ===
Year	Championship	Winning score	Margin	Runner-up
1968	LPGA Championship	+2 (72-75-74-73=294)	Playoff^{1}	(United States) Kathy Whitworth

^{1}Won in a playoff (68 Post, 75 Whitworth).
