= Lady Stroh's Open =

Golf tournament formerly on the LPGA Tour

The Lady Stroh's Open was a golf tournament on the LPGA Tour from 1978 to 1979. It was played at the Dearborn Country Club in Dearborn, Michigan.

== Winners ==
- 1979 Vicki Fergon
- 1978 Sandra Post
