= Colgate-Hong Kong Open =

Golf tournament in Hong Kong

The Colgate-Hong Kong Open was a golf tournament on the LPGA Tour played only in 1976. It was played at the Royal Hong Kong Golf Club in Hong Kong. Judy Rankin won the event by one stroke over Hisako "Chako" Higuchi.
