= Donna Caponi =

American professional golfer (born 1945)

Personal information
- Full name: Donna Caponi-Byrnes
- Nationality: United States
- Born: January 29, 1945 (age 81) Detroit, Michigan, U.S.
- Height: 5 ft 5 in (1.65 m)
- Spouses: Ken Young (1971–81); Ted Byrnes (2006–)

Career
- Sport: Golf
- Turned professional: 1965
- Former tour: LPGA Tour (joined 1965)
- Professional wins: 29

Number of wins by tour
- LPGA Tour: 24
- Other: 5

Best results in LPGA major championships (wins: 4)
- Western Open: 21st: 1967
- Titleholders C'ship: 12th: 1966
- Chevron Championship: T13: 1985
- Women's PGA C'ship: Won: 1979, 1981
- U.S. Women's Open: Won: 1969, 1970
- du Maurier Classic: 3rd: 1980, 1982

Achievements and awards
- World Golf Hall of Fame: 2001 (member page)
- GWAA Female Player of the Year: 1981
- PGA First Lady of Golf Award: 2010

Donna Caponi-Byrnes (born January 29, 1945) is an American LPGA Tour professional golfer. She became a member of the tour in 1965 and won four major championships and 24 LPGA Tour career events. She is a member of the World Golf Hall of Fame.

== Early life and amateur career ==
Caponi was born in Detroit, Michigan. She started playing golf at the age of 5. She learned golf from her father, Harry, and won the Los Angeles Junior title in 1956.

She tied for 21st as an amateur at the 1964 Hillside House Ladies' Open on the LPGA Tour.

== Professional career ==
In 1965, Caponi joined the LPGA Tour. She won her first tournament in 1969 at the U.S. Women's Open. She is one of 14 players to make the U.S. Women’s Open her first LPGA victory. She would repeat as champion in 1970. Only Mickey Wright had ever won back-to-back U.S. Women's Opens before Caponi, who also matched Wright's 72-hole scoring record of 287. She would go on to win a total of 24 events on the LPGA Tour, including four major championships.

Caponi was named Female Player of the Year by Golf Writers Association of America in 1981. She finished in the top ten on the money list ten times between 1968 and 1981, including second-place finishes in 1976 and 1980. She retired from full-time competition in 1988. She was inducted into the World Golf Hall of Fame in 2001. In 2009, she was the recipient of the PGA First Lady of Golf Award.

She is currently an announcer on the Golf Channel, covering the Champions Tour.

== Personal life ==
From 1971 to 1981, Caponi was married to Ken Young and was known as Donna Caponi Young. After her divorce in 1981, she changed her name back to Donna Caponi.

She married her longtime boyfriend Edward "Ted" Byrnes on July 29, 2006, and changed her name to Donna Caponi-Byrnes.

== Awards and honors ==
- In 1981, Caponi was named Female Player of the Year by Golf Writers Association of America.
- In 2001, she was inducted into the World Golf Hall of Fame.
- In 2009, Caponi-Byrnes earned the PGA First Lady of Golf Award.

== Professional wins (29) ==
=== LPGA Tour wins (24) ===
Legend
LPGA Tour major championships (4)
Other LPGA Tour (20)

No.	Date	Tournament	Winning score	Margin of victory	Runner(s)-up
1	Jun 29, 1969	U.S. Women's Open	+2 (74-75-76-69=294)	1 stroke	(United States) Peggy Wilson
2	Sep 21, 1969	Lincoln-Mercury Open	−2 (74-68-72=214)	Playoff	(United States) Kathy Whitworth
3	May 24, 1970	Bluegrass Invitational	−2 (72-70-72=214)	1 stroke	(United States) Mary Mills
4	Jul 5, 1970	U.S. Women's Open	+3 (69-70-71-77=287)	1 stroke	(United States) Sandra Haynie (United States) Sandra Spuzich
5	May 20, 1973	Bluegrass Invitational	−3 (72-72-72=216)	2 strokes	(United States) Sandra Spuzich
6	Feb 2, 1975	Burdine's Invitational	−8 (70-71-67=208)	3 strokes	(United States) Kathy Cornelius
7	May 11, 1975	Lady Tara Classic	−5 (72-70-72=214)	1 stroke	(United States) Gloria Ehret (Canada) Sandra Post
8	Jun 13, 1976	Peter Jackson Classic	−4 (72-73-67=212)	Playoff	(United States) Judy Rankin
9	Sep 19, 1976	Portland Classic	−2 (72-71-74=217)	Playoff	(United States) Clifford Ann Creed
10	Sep 26, 1976	The Carlton	−6 (69-69-72-72=282)	5 strokes	(United States) Jane Blalock (United States) Judy Rankin
11	Nov 3, 1976	LPGA/Japan Mizuno Classic	−5 (74-71-72=217)	4 strokes	(Japan) Chako Higuchi
12	Sep 17, 1978	The Sarah Coventry	−10 (72-71-68-71=282)	5 strokes	(United States) Jane Blalock
13	Oct 22, 1978	Houston Exchange Clubs Classic	−9 (70-68-69=207)	3 strokes	(United States) Alexandra Reinhardt
14	Jun 10, 1979	LPGA Championship	−9 (69-70-70-70=279)	3 strokes	(United States) Jerilyn Britz
15	Mar 23, 1980	LPGA National Pro-Am	−2 (71-74-71-70=286)	1 stroke	(United States) Nancy Lopez
16	Apr 6, 1980	Colgate-Dinah Shore Winner's Circle	−13 (71-67-66-71=275)	2 strokes	(United States) Amy Alcott
17	May 25, 1980	Corning Classic	−7 (66-72-69-74=281)	2 strokes	(United States) Myra Blackwelder
18	Sep 14, 1980	United Virginia Bank Classic	−11 (70-67-66-74=277)	4 strokes	(United States) Nancy Lopez
19	Sep 21, 1980	ERA Real Estate Classic	−9 (75-68-71-69=283)	5 strokes	(United States) Shelley Hamlin
20	Mar 22, 1981	LPGA Desert Inn Pro-Am	−3 (74-75-69-68=286)	3 strokes	(United States) Pat Bradley
21	Apr 12, 1981	American Defender/WRAL Golf Classic	−8 (71-65-72=208)	1 stroke	(Canada) Cathy Sherk
22	Jun 14, 1981	LPGA Championship	−8 (69-68-70-73=280)	1 stroke	(United States) Jerilyn Britz (United States) Pat Meyers
23	Jul 19, 1981	WUI Classic	−6 (71-69-69-73=282)	2 strokes	(United States) Julie Pyne
24	Aug 2, 1981	Boston Five Classic	−12 (69-68-68-71=276)	6 strokes	(Australia) Jan Stephenson

Note: Caponi won the Peter Jackson Classic (which became the du Maurier Classic) and the Colgate-Dinah Shore Winner's Circle (now known as the Kraft Nabisco Championship) before they became major championships.

LPGA Tour playoff record (3–5)

No.	Year	Tournament	Opponent(s)	Result
1	1969	Lincoln-Mercury Open	(United States) Kathy Whitworth	Won with par on first extra hole
2	1974	Lady Tara Classic	(United States) Sandra Spuzich (United States) Kathy Whitworth	Spuzich won with par on fifth extra hole Whitworth eliminated by par on third hole
3	1976	Peter Jackson Classic	(United States) Judy Rankin	Won with par on first extra hole
4	1976	Portland Classic	(United States) Clifford Ann Creed	Won with birdie on second extra hole
5	1979	Women's Kemper Open	(United States) JoAnne Carner (Japan) Chako Higuchi (United States) Nancy Lopez (Australia) Jan Stephenson	Carner won with par on second extra hole Caponi, Lopez, and Stephenson eliminated by par on first hole
6	1980	West Virginia LPGA Classic	(Canada) Sandra Post	Lost to birdie on third extra hole
7	1981	Florida Lady Citrus	(United States) Beth Daniel (United States) Cindy Hill (United States) Patti Rizzo (United States) Patty Sheehan	Daniel won with birdie on second extra hole Hill, Rizzo, and Sheehan eliminated by par on first hole
8	1981	Inamori Classic	(United States) Amy Alcott (United States) Hollis Stacy (Australia) Jan Stephenson	Stacy won with birdie on first extra hole

=== Other wins (5) ===
- 1975 Colgate European Open
- 1976 Wills Qantas Australian Ladies Open
- 1978 Ping Classic Team Championship (with Kathy Whitworth)
- 1980 Portland Ping Team Championship (with Kathy Whitworth)
- 1981 Portland Ping Team Championship (with Kathy Whitworth)

== Major championships ==
=== Wins (4) ===
Year	Championship	Winning score	Margin	Runner(s)-up
1969	U.S. Women's Open	+2 (74-76-75-69=294)	1 stroke	(United States) Peggy Wilson
1970	U.S. Women's Open	+3 (69-70-71-77=287)	1 stroke	(United States) Sandra Haynie, (United States) Sandra Spuzich
1979	LPGA Championship	−9 (69-70-70-70=279)	3 strokes	(United States) Jerilyn Britz
1981	LPGA Championship	−8 (69-68-70-73=280)	1 stroke	(United States) Jerilyn Britz, (United States) Pat Meyers

== See also ==
- List of golfers with most LPGA Tour wins
- List of golfers with most LPGA major championship wins
