= GAC Classic =

LPGA Tour golf tournament

The GAC Classic was a golf tournament on the LPGA Tour from 1972 to 1973. It was played at the 49ers Country Club in Tucson, Arizona.

== Winners ==
- 1973 Judy Rankin
- 1972 Betsy Rawls
