= Karsten-Ping Open =

LPGA Tour event from 1975 to 1976

The Karsten-Ping Open was a golf tournament on the LPGA Tour from 1975 to 1976. It was played at the Camelback Country Club in Paradise Valley, Arizona in 1975 and at the McCormick Ranch Golf Club in Scottsdale, Arizona in 1976.

== Winners ==
- 1976 Judy Rankin
- 1975 Jane Blalock
