= Suzuki Golf Internationale =

Golf tournament formerly on the LPGA Tour

The Suzuki Golf Internationale was a golf tournament on the LPGA Tour from 1971 to 1972. It was played at the Los Coyotes Country Club in Buena Park, California in 1971 and at the Brookside Golf Club in Pasadena, California in 1972.

== Winners ==
- 1972 Jane Blalock
- 1971 Kathy Whitworth
