= Lady Errol Classic =

Golf tournament formerly on the LPGA Tour

The Lady Errol Classic was a golf tournament on the LPGA Tour from 1972 to 1974. It was founded by Joan Majors with help from her neighbor Martha Rayborn. Majors lived in Winter Park, Florida with her husband John, and three children, Kathy, Diana and Gary. The golf tournament was played at the Errol Estates Country Club in Apopka, Florida. When Majors' husband was transferred to Columbia, South Carolina, she was unable to direct the tournament and it ceased to continue.

== Winners ==
- 1974 Jane Blalock
- 1973 Kathy Whitworth
- 1972 Jane Blalock
