= Columbia Savings LPGA National Pro-Am =

Golf tournament in Colorado, US

The Columbia Savings LPGA National Pro-Am was a golf tournament on the LPGA Tour from 1972 to 1987. It was played at several clubs in the Denver, Colorado area. From 1985 to 1987, the tournament was played on two courses.

== Tournament locations ==
Years	Venue	Location
1972–73, 1976, 1978–79, 1984	Green Gables Country Club	Denver, Colorado
1974	Rolling Hills Country Club	Golden, Colorado
1975	Pinehurst Country Club	Denver, Colorado
1977, 1980–83	Columbine Country Club	Columbine Valley, Colorado
1985–87	Lone Tree Golf Club	Lone Tree, Colorado
1985, 1987	Meridian Golf Club	Englewood, Colorado
1986	Glenmoor Country Club	Cherry Hills Village, Colorado

== Winners ==
Columbia Savings LPGA National Pro-Am

- 1987 Christa Johnson

LPGA National Pro-Am

- 1986 Amy Alcott
- 1985 Pat Bradley

Columbia Savings Classic

- 1984 Betsy King
- 1983 Pat Bradley
- 1982 Beth Daniel

Columbia Savings LPGA Classic

- 1981 JoAnne Carner
- 1980 Beth Daniel

Columbia Savings Classic

- 1979 Sally Little

National Jewish Hospital Open

- 1978 Kathy Whitworth
- 1977 JoAnne Carner
- 1976 Sandra Palmer
- 1975 Judy Rankin
- 1974 Sandra Haynie
- 1973 Sandra Palmer
- 1972 Sandra Haynie
