= Kyocera Inamori Classic =

Golf tournament formerly on the LPGA Tour

The Kyocera Inamori Classic was a golf tournament on the LPGA Tour from 1980 to 1993. It was played at several different courses in California, mostly in the San Diego area.

Jane Blalock's streak of 299 consecutive cuts made, an all-time LPGA Tour record, ended at the 1980 Inamori Golf Classic when she shot rounds of 78 and 76.

== Tournament locations ==
Years	Venue	Location
1980-82	Almaden Golf & Country Club	San Jose, California
1983	Torrey Pines Golf Course	San Diego, California
1985	Fairbanks Ranch Country Club	San Diego, California
1985-86	Bernardo Heights Country Club	San Diego, California
1987-92	StoneRidge Country Club	Poway, California
1993	Stardust Country Club	San Diego, California

== Winners ==
Kyocera Inamori Classic

- 1993 Kris Monaghan

Inamori Classic

- 1992 Judy Dickinson
- 1991 Laura Davies

Red Robin Kyocera Inamori Classic

- 1990 Kris Monaghan
- 1989 Patti Rizzo

San Diego Inamori Golf Classic

- 1988 Ayako Okamoto

Kyocera Inamori Golf Classic

- 1987 Ayako Okamoto

Kyocera Inamori Classic

- 1986 Patty Sheehan
- 1985 Beth Daniel

Inamori Classic

- 1984 No tournament
- 1983 Patty Sheehan
- 1982 Patty Sheehan
- 1981 Hollis Stacy

Inamori Golf Classic

- 1980 Amy Alcott
