= Pat Meyers =

American professional golfer (born 1954)

Personal information
- Nationality: United States
- Born: May 8, 1954 (age 72)
- Height: 5 ft 4 in (1.63 m)

Career
- Sport: Golf
- College: Daytona Beach Community College
- Status: Professional
- Former tour: LPGA Tour (1976–1987)
- Professional wins: 1

Number of wins by tour
- LPGA Tour: 1

Best results in LPGA major championships
- Chevron Championship: T52: 1983, 1984
- Women's PGA C'ship: T2: 1981
- U.S. Women's Open: T12: 1978
- du Maurier Classic: T21: 1983

Pat Meyers (born May 8, 1954) is an American professional golfer who played on the LPGA Tour.

Meyers won once on the LPGA Tour in 1979.

== Professional wins ==
=== LPGA Tour wins (1) ===
| No. | Date | Tournament | Winning score | Margin of victory | Runners-up |
|---|---|---|---|---|---|
| 1 | Jul 22, 1979 | Greater Baltimore Classic | −9 (70-69-71=210) | 1 stroke | (United States) Dot Germain (South Africa) Sally Little |

LPGA Tour playoff record (0–1)

| No. | Year | Tournament | Opponents | Result |
|---|---|---|---|---|
| 1 | 1978 | Lady Stroh's Open | (United States) Sandra Post (United States) Kathy Whitworth | Post won with birdie on second extra hole |
