= George Washington Classic =

Golf tournament

The George Washington Classic was a golf tournament on the LPGA Tour from 1970 to 1975. It was played at the Hidden Spring Golf Club in Horsham, Pennsylvania.

== Winners ==
George Washington Ladies Classic

- 1975 Carol Mann

George Washington Classic

- 1974 Sandra Haynie
- 1973 Carole Jo Skala
- 1972 Kathy Ahern
- 1971 Jane Blalock

George Washington Golf Classic

- 1970 Judy Rankin
