= Bluegrass Invitational =

Golf tournament formerly on the LPGA Tour

The Bluegrass Invitational was a golf tournament on the LPGA Tour from 1965 to 1974. It was played at the Hunting Creek Country Club in Prospect, Kentucky.

== Winners ==
Bluegrass Invitational

- 1974 JoAnne Carner
- 1973 Donna Caponi
- 1972 Kathy Cornelius
- 1971 JoAnne Carner
- 1970 Donna Caponi
- 1969 Mickey Wright

Bluegrass Ladies Invitational

- 1968 Carol Mann

Bluegrass Invitational

- 1967 Mickey Wright

Bluegrass Ladies Invitational

- 1966 Mickey Wright

Blue Grass Invitational

- 1965 Kathy Whitworth
