= Potamkin Cadillac Classic =

Golf tournament formerly on the LPGA Tour

The Potamkin Cadillac Classic was a golf tournament on the LPGA Tour from 1968 to 1984 sponsored by Victor Potamkin. It was played at three different courses in the Atlanta, Georgia area.

At the 1982 Lady Michelob, Joan Joyce set a tour record by only taking 17 putts during the tournament's final round.

== Tournament locations ==
Years	venue	Location
1968–1969	Canongate Country Club	Sharpsburg, Georgia
1970–1976	Indian Hills Country Club	Marietta, Georgia
1977–1984	Brookfield West Golf & Country Club	Roswell, Georgia

== Winners ==
Potamkin Cadillac Classic

- 1984 Sharon Barrett

Lady Michelob

- 1983 Janet Coles
- 1982 Kathy Whitworth
- 1981 Amy Alcott
- 1980 Pam Higgins
- 1979 Sandra Post

Natural Light Lady Tara Classic

- 1978 Janet Coles

Lady Tara Classic

- 1977 Hollis Stacy
- 1976 JoAnne Carner
- 1975 Donna Caponi
- 1974 Sandra Spuzich
- 1973 Mary Mills

Lady Pepsi Open

- 1972 Jan Ferraris
- 1971 Jane Blalock

Lady Carling Open

- 1970 Jane Blalock
- 1969 Kathy Whitworth
- 1968 Carol Mann
