= Golden Lights Championship =

Golf tournament formerly on the LPGA Tour

The Golden Lights Championship was a golf tournament on the LPGA Tour from 1975 to 1981. It was played at the All-American Sports City Country club in Pine Plains, New York in 1975, at the Wykagyl Country Club in New Rochelle, New York from 1976 to 1980 and at The Stanwich Club in Greenwich, Connecticut in 1981.

== Winners ==
Golden Lights Championship

- 1981 Cathy Reynolds
- 1980 Beth Daniel
- 1979 Nancy Lopez
- 1978 Nancy Lopez

Talk Tournament '77

- 1977 JoAnne Carner

Girl Talk Classic

- 1976 Pat Bradley
- 1975 JoAnne Carner
