= Elizabeth Arden Classic =

Golf tournament formerly on the LPGA Tour

The Elizabeth Arden Classic was a golf tournament on the LPGA Tour from 1969 to 1986. It was played at several different courses in the Miami, Florida area.

== Tournament locations ==
Years	Venue	Location
1969–1971	Country Club of Miami	Miami, Florida
1972–1973	Doral Country Club, Red Course	Doral, Florida
1974–1978	Kendale Lakes Country Club	Kendale Lakes, Florida
1979	Country Club of Aventura	Aventura, Florida
1980–1986	Turnberry Isle Country Club	Aventura, Florida

== Winners ==
Elizabeth Arden Classic

- 1986 Ayako Okamoto
- 1985 JoAnne Carner
- 1984 Patty Sheehan
- 1983 Nancy Lopez
- 1982 JoAnne Carner
- 1981 Sally Little
- 1980 Jane Blalock
- 1979 Amy Alcott

American Cancer Society Classic

- 1978 Debbie Austin
- 1977 Pam Higgins

Burdine's Invitational

- 1976 Judy Rankin
- 1975 Donna Caponi
- 1974 Sandra Palmer
- 1973 Jo Ann Prentice
- 1972 Marlene Hagge
- 1971 Sandra Haynie
- 1970 Carol Mann
- 1969 JoAnne Gunderson (as an amateur)
