= Birmingham Classic (golf) =

Golf tournament formerly on the LPGA Tour

The Birmingham Classic was a golf tournament on the LPGA Tour from 1972 to 1982. It was played at the Green Valley Country Club in Birmingham, Alabama.

== Winners ==
Birmingham Classic

- 1982 Beth Daniel
- 1981 Beth Solomon
- 1980 Barbara Barrow

Otey Crisman Classic

- 1979 Jane Blalock

Birmingham Classic

- 1978 Hollis Stacy
- 1977 Debbie Austin
- 1976 Jan Stephenson
- 1975 Maria Astrologes
- 1974 Jane Blalock
- 1973 Gloria Ehret

Birmingham Centennial Classic

- 1972 Betty Burfeindt
