= 1968 LPGA Tour =

Golf tour season

1968 LPGA Tour season
- Duration: March 14, 1968 – December 1, 1968
- Number of official events: 32
- Most wins: 10 (United States) Carol Mann, (United States) Kathy Whitworth
- Money leader: (United States) Kathy Whitworth
- Player of the Year: (United States) Kathy Whitworth
- Vare Trophy: (United States) Carol Mann
- Rookie of the Year: (Canada) Sandra Post

The 1968 LPGA Tour was the 19th season since the LPGA Tour officially began in 1950. The season ran from March 14 to December 1. The season consisted of 32 official money events. Carol Mann and Kathy Whitworth won the most tournaments, 10 each. Whitworth led the money list with earnings of $48,379.

There were three first-time winners in 1968: Sandra Post, the first Canadian winner, Judy Rankin, and Peggy Wilson.

The tournament results and award winners are listed below.

== Tournament results ==
The following table shows all the official money events for the 1968 season. "Date" is the ending date of the tournament. The numbers in parentheses after the winners' names are the number of wins they had on the tour up to and including that event. Majors are shown in bold.

Date	Tournament	Location	Winner	Score	Purse ($)	1st prize ($)
Mar 17	St. Petersburg Orange Blossom Open	Florida	(United States) Kathy Whitworth (37)	213	12,500	1,875
Mar 24	Port Malabar Invitational	Florida	(United States) Mickey Wright (77)	216 (+3)	10,000	1,500
Mar 31	Palm Beach County Open	Florida	(United States) Mickey Wright (78)	215 (−1)	12,500	1,875
Apr 14	O'Sullivan Open	Virginia	(United States) Marilynn Smith (19)	216 (+3)	12,500	1,875
Apr 21	Lady Carling Open	Georgia	(United States) Carol Mann (11)	200 (−16)	15,000	2,250
Apr 28	Raleigh Ladies Invitational	North Carolina	(United States) Carol Mann (12)	214 (−2)	15,000	2,250
May 5	Shreveport Kiwanis Club Invitational	Louisiana	(United States) Carol Mann (13)	217 (+1)	11,500	1,725
May 12	Tall City Open	Texas	(United States) Mickey Wright (79)	204 (−3)	17,500	2,625
May 26	Dallas Civitan Open	Texas	(United States) Kathy Whitworth (38)	209 (−4)	18,500	2,775
Jun 9	Bluegrass Ladies Invitational	Kentucky	(United States) Carol Mann (14)	210 (−6)	14,250	2,100
Jun 16	500 Ladies Classic	Indiana	(United States) Mickey Wright (80)	212 (−4)	15,500	2,250
Jun 23	**LPGA Championship**	Massachusetts	(Canada) **Sandra Post (1)**	294 (+2)	20,000	3,000
Jun 30	Lady Carling Open	Maryland	(United States) Kathy Whitworth (39)	214 (−2)	20,000	3,000
Jul 7	**U.S. Women's Open**	Pennsylvania	(United States) **Susie Berning (5)**	289 (+5)	25,000	5,000
Jul 14	Pabst Ladies Classic	Ohio	(United States) Carol Mann (15)	206 (−10)	28,000	4,200
Jul 21	Buckeye Savings Invitational	Ohio	(United States) Carol Mann (16)	209 (−7)	18,500	2,775
Jul 27	Supertest Canadian Open	Canada	(United States) Carol Mann (17)	213 (−6)	20,500	3,000
Aug 4	Gino Paoli Open	Connecticut	(United States) Kathy Whitworth (40)	215 (−1)	15,000	2,250
Aug 10	Concord Open	New York	(United States) Shirley Englehorn (7)	229 (−2)	28,500	4,275
Aug 18	Holiday Inn Classic	Missouri	(United States) Kathy Whitworth (41)	206 (−1)	15,685	2,260
Sep 1	Willow Park Ladies Invitational	Canada	(United States) Carol Mann (18)	205 (−8)	15,000	2,250
Sep 8	Pacific Ladies Classic	Oregon	(United States) Sandra Haynie (14)	213 (−3)	12,500	1,875
Sep 15	Shirley Englehorn Invitational	Idaho	(United States) Carol Mann (19)	208 (−5)	11,500	1,725
Sep 22	Kings River Open	California	(United States) Kathy Whitworth (42)	208 (−8)	15,000	2,250
Sep 29	Mickey Wright Invitational	California	(United States) Betsy Rawls (51)	208 (−8)	13,500	2,025
Oct 20	Quality Chek'd Classic	Texas	(United States) Carol Mann (20)	212 (−4)	12,500	1,875
Oct 27	River Plantation Invitational	Texas	(United States) Kathy Whitworth (43)	205 (−8)	12,500	1,875
Nov 3	Canyon Ladies Classic	California	(United States) Kathy Whitworth (44)	218 (+2)	22,750	3,300
Nov 10	Corpus Christi Civitan Open	Texas	(United States) Judy Rankin (1)	213 (+3)	12,500	1,875
Nov 17	Pensacola Ladies Invitational	Florida	(United States) Kathy Whitworth (45)	216 (−3)	12,500	1,875
Nov 24	Louise Suggs Invitational	Florida	(United States) Kathy Whitworth (46)	210 (−6)	12,500	1,875
Dec 1	Hollywood Lakes Open	Florida	(United States) Peggy Wilson (1)	209 (−7)	12,500	1,875

== Awards ==
Award	Winner	Country
Money winner	Kathy Whitworth (4)	United States
Scoring leader (Vare Trophy)	Carol Mann	United States
Player of the Year	Kathy Whitworth (3)	United States
Rookie of the Year	Sandra Post	Canada
