= 1969 LPGA Tour =

Golf tour season

1969 LPGA Tour season
- Duration: January 16, 1969 – November 2, 1969
- Number of official events: 29
- Most wins: 8 (United States) Carol Mann
- Money leader: (United States) Carol Mann
- Player of the Year: (United States) Kathy Whitworth
- Vare Trophy: (United States) Kathy Whitworth
- Rookie of the Year: (United States) Jane Blalock

The 1969 LPGA Tour was the 20th season since the LPGA Tour officially began in 1950. The season ran from January 16 to November 2. The season consisted of 29 official money events. Carol Mann won the most tournaments, eight. She also led the money list with earnings of $49,152.

There were two first-time winners in 1969: Donna Caponi and JoAnne Carner, who would win 43 LPGA events in her career.

The tournament results and award winners are listed below.

== Tournament results ==
The following table shows all the official money events for the 1969 season. "Date" is the ending date of the tournament. The numbers in parentheses after the winners' names are the number of wins they had on the tour up to and including that event. Majors are shown in bold.

Date	Tournament	Location	Winner	Score	Purse ($)	1st prize ($)
Jan 19	Burdine's Invitational	Florida	(United States) JoAnne Carner (1*) (a)	216 (E)	35,000	5,200
Mar 17	Orange Blossom Open	Florida	(United States) Kathy Whitworth (47)	216 (+3)	15,000	2,250
Mar 23	Port Charlotte Invitational	Florida	(United States) Kathy Whitworth (48)	218 (−1)	15,000	2,250
Mar 30	Port Malabar Invitational	Florida	(United States) Kathy Whitworth (49)	210 (−3)	17,500	2,625
Apr 20	Lady Carling Open	Georgia	(United States) Kathy Whitworth (50)	212 (−4)	17,500	2,625
Apr 27	Raleigh Ladies Invitational	North Carolina	(United States) Carol Mann (21)	212 (−4)	15,000	2,250
May 4	Shreveport Kiwanis Club Invitational	Louisiana	(United States) Sandra Haynie (15)	214 (−2)	15,000	2,250
May 11	Dallas Civitan Open	Texas	(United States) Carol Mann (22)	209 (−4)	22,000	3,225
May 18	St. Louis Women's Invitational	Missouri	(United States) Sandra Haynie (16)	208 (−5)	16,000	2,400
May 25	Bluegrass Invitational	Kentucky	(United States) Mickey Wright (81)	216 (E)	15,750	2,325
Jun 2	O'Sullivan Ladies Open	Virginia	(United States) Murle Lindstrom (4)	208 (−5)	15,000	2,250
Jun 8	Lady Carling Open	Maryland	(United States) Susie Berning (6)	213 (−6)	20,000	3,000
Jun 15	Patty Berg Classic	Massachusetts	(United States) Kathy Whitworth (51)	214 (−5)	25,000	3,750
Jun 22	Pabst Ladies Classic	Ohio	(United States) Susie Berning (7)	211 (−5)	30,000	4,500
Jun 29	**U.S. Women's Open**	Florida	(United States) **Donna Caponi (1)**	294 (+2)	31,040	5,000
Jul 13	Ladies' Supertest Open	Canada	(United States) Sandra Haynie (17)	216 (−3)	22,000	3,300
Jul 20	Danbury Lady Carling Open	Connecticut	(United States) Carol Mann (23)	215 (−1)	20,000	3,000
Jul 27	**LPGA Championship**	New York	(United States) **Betsy Rawls (52)**	293 (+1)	35,000	5,250
Aug 3	Buckeye Savings Invitational	Ohio	(United States) Sandra Spuzich (2)	213 (+3)	20,000	3,000
Aug 10	Stroh's-WBLY Open	Ohio	(United States) Marlene Hagge (25)	216 (−2)	20,000	3,000
Aug 17	Southgate Ladies Open	Kansas	(United States) Carol Mann (24)	217 (+1)	20,000	3,000
Aug 24	Tournament of Champs	Canada	(United States) Carol Mann (25)	216 (−3)	20,000	3,000
Sep 7	Molson's Canadian Open	Canada	(United States) Carol Mann (26)	212 (−4)	25,500	3,750
Sep 14	Wendell-West Open	Washington	(United States) Kathy Whitworth (52)	213 (−3)	22,000	3,225
Sep 21	Lincoln-Mercury Open	California	(United States) Donna Caponi (2)	214 (−2)	20,500	3,000
Oct 5	Mickey Wright Invitational	California	(United States) Carol Mann (27)	212 (−7)	20,000	3,000
Oct 19	Quality Chek'd Classic	Texas	(United States) Mary Mills (6)	213 (−3)	15,000	2,250
Oct 26	Corpus Christi Civitan Open	Texas	(United States) Carol Mann (28)	212 (+2)	15,000	2,250
Nov 2	River Plantation Women's Open	Texas	(United States) Kathy Whitworth (53)	213 (E)	17,500	2,625

a – amateur
* - non-member at time of win

== Awards ==
Award	Winner	Country
Money winner	Carol Mann	United States
Scoring leader (Vare Trophy)	Kathy Whitworth (4)	United States
Player of the Year	Kathy Whitworth (4)	United States
Rookie of the Year	Jane Blalock	United States
