= 1967 LPGA Tour =

Golf tour season

1967 LPGA Tour season
- Duration: March 16, 1967 – November 19, 1967
- Number of official events: 28
- Most wins: 8 (United States) Kathy Whitworth
- Money leader: (United States) Kathy Whitworth
- Player of the Year: (United States) Kathy Whitworth
- Vare Trophy: (United States) Kathy Whitworth
- Rookie of the Year: (United States) Sharron Moran

The 1967 LPGA Tour was the 18th season since the LPGA Tour officially began in 1950. The season ran from March 16 to November 19. The season consisted of 28 official money events. Kathy Whitworth won the most tournaments, eight. She also led the money list with earnings of $32,937.

There were two first-time winners in 1967: Catherine Lacoste from France and Margie Masters from Australia. They were the first winners from the continents of Europe and Australia, respectively. This season also saw the last playing of the Women's Western Open, an LPGA major.

The tournament results and award winners are listed below.

== Tournament results ==
The following table shows all the official money events for the 1967 season. "Date" is the ending date of the tournament. The numbers in parentheses after the winners' names are the number of wins they had on the tour up to and including that event. Majors are shown in bold.

Date	Tournament	Location	Winner	Score	Purse ($)	1st prize ($)
Mar 19	St. Petersburg Orange Classic	Florida	(United States) Marilynn Smith (17)	283	12,500	1,875
Mar 26	Venice Ladies Open	Florida	(United States) Kathy Whitworth (29)	217	10,000	1,500
Apr 2	Louise Suggs Invitational	Florida	(United States) Susie Maxwell (3)	224	10,000	1,500
Apr 23	Raleigh Ladies Invitational	North Carolina	(United States) Kathy Whitworth (30)	215	12,000	1,800
Apr 30	Shreveport Kiwanis Club Invitational	Louisiana	(United States) Mickey Wright (73)	219	10,000	1,500
May 7	Tall City Open	Texas	(United States) Carol Mann (8)	214	12,500	1,875
May 15	Dallas Civitan Open	Texas	(United States) Jo Ann Prentice (2)	281	16,800	2,475
May 21	Babe Zaharias Open	Texas	(United States) Marilynn Smith (18)	210	10,000	1,500
Jun 4	St. Louis Women's Invitational	Missouri	(United States) Kathy Whitworth (31)	209	13,500	2,025
Jun 11	Bluegrass Invitational	Kentucky	(United States) Mickey Wright (74)	208	10,000	1,500
Jun 18	Milwaukee Jaycee Open	Wisconsin	(United States) Susie Maxwell (4)	216	15,000	2,250
Jun 25	Buckeye Savings Invitational	Ohio	(United States) Carol Mann (9)	207	14,000	2,100
Jul 2	**U.S. Women's Open**	Virginia	(France) **Catherine Lacoste (1*)** (a)	294	25,000	(5,000)
Jul 9	Lady Carling Open	Maryland	(United States) Mickey Wright (75)	207	15,000	2,250
Jul 16	**LPGA Championship**	Massachusetts	(United States) **Kathy Whitworth (32)**	284	17,500	2,625
Jul 22	Supertest Ladies' Open	Canada	(United States) Carol Mann (10)	210	18,000	2,700
Aug 6	Lady Carling Open	Ohio	(United States) Kathy Whitworth (33)	212	20,500	3,075
Aug 20	**Women's Western Open**	Illinois	(United States) **Kathy Whitworth (34)**	289	10,000	1,500
Aug 27	Amarillo Ladies' Open	Texas	(United States) Sandra Haynie (12)	212	13,000	1,950
Sep 10	Pacific Golf Classic	Oregon	(United States) Clifford Ann Creed (10)	211	10,750	1,575
Sep 17	Shirley Englehorn Invitational	Idaho	(United States) Shirley Englehorn (6)	210	11,000	1,650
Sep 24	Mickey Wright Invitational	California	(United States) Sandra Haynie (13)	212	11,500	1,725
Oct 1	Ladies' Los Angeles Open	California	(United States) Kathy Whitworth (35)	212	16,000	2,325
Oct 22	Carlsbad Jaycee Open	New Mexico	(United States) Murle Lindstrom (3)	216	11,000	1,650
Oct 29	Alamo Ladies' Open	Texas	(United States) Kathy Whitworth (36)	213	12,500	1,875
Nov 5	Corpus Christi Civitan Open	Texas	(United States) Clifford Ann Creed (11)	214	11,500	1,725
Nov 12	Quality Chek'd Classic	Texas	(Australia) Margie Masters (1)	214	11,500	1,725
Nov 19	Pensacola Ladies Invitational	Florida	(United States) Mickey Wright (76)	210	10,000	1,500

a - amateur
* - non-member at time of win

== Awards ==
Award	Winner	Country
Money winner	Kathy Whitworth (3)	United States
Scoring leader (Vare Trophy)	Kathy Whitworth (3)	United States
Player of the Year	Kathy Whitworth (2)	United States
Rookie of the Year	Sharron Moran	United States
