= List of Women's PGA Championship champions =

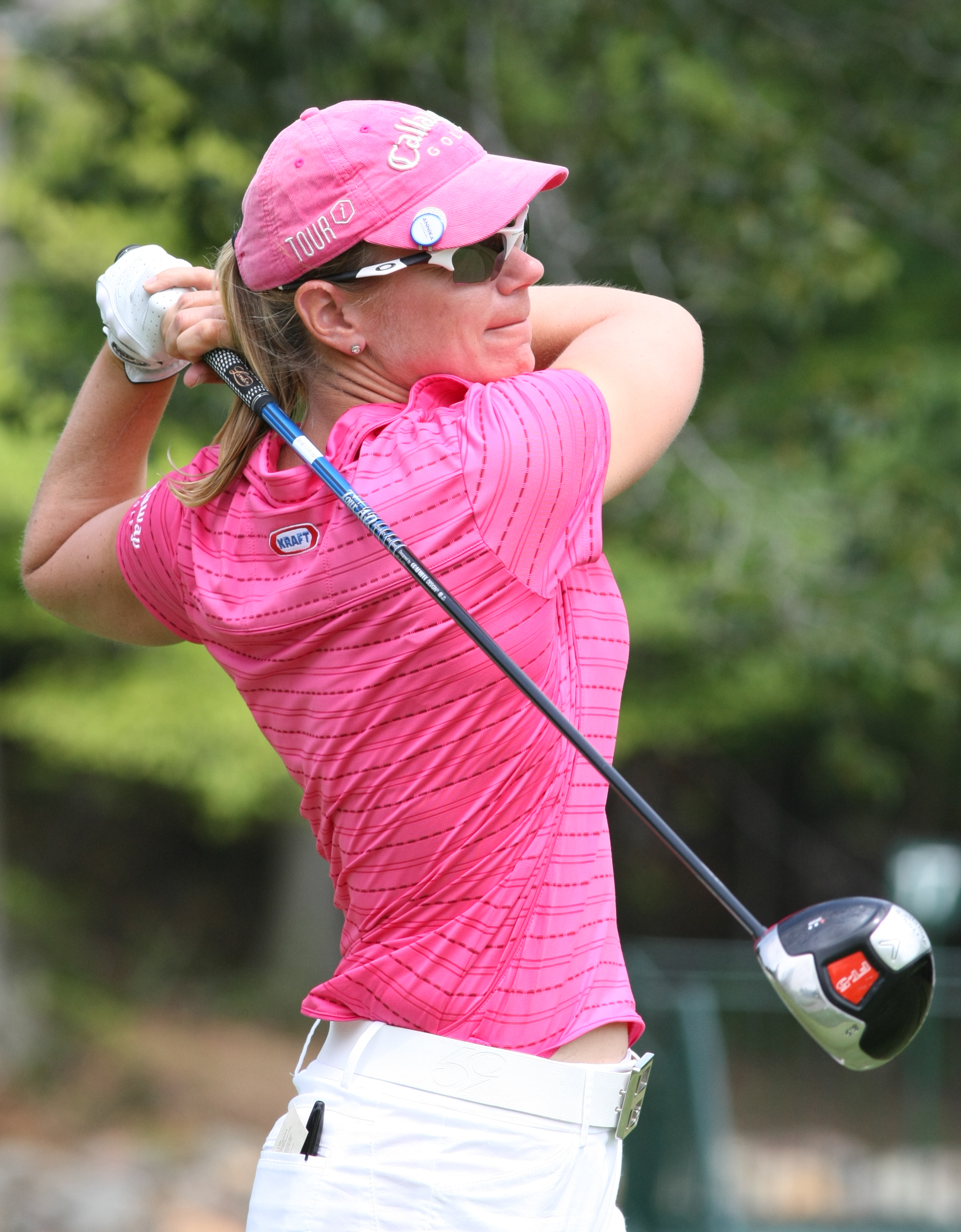
Annika Sörenstam was a three-time consecutive champion of the event in 2003, 2004 and 2005.

The Women's PGA Championship^{[a]} is an annual golf competition held in June, and is conducted by the Professional Golfers Association of America (PGA). The event was established in 1955, and is one of the five women's major championships played each year; the others are the ANA Inspiration, the U.S. Women's Open, the Women's British Open, and the Evian Championship. This event has always been conducted in stroke play competition, and is always the second women's major of the year. The first year was played with three rounds of stroke play and a final round of match play to determine the final places (36 holes for the championship, 18 holes for other matches) in order to distribute prize money. The trophy, formally known as the "LPGA Championship Trophy" is presented to the champion every year, with each recipient being awarded a replica of the trophy to keep.

Mickey Wright holds the record for the most victories with four. Annika Sörenstam has the record for most consecutive wins with three. The lowest score for 72 holes on a par 71 golf course is Betsy King's 267, 17-under par in 1992, and on a par 72 golf course is Cristie Kerr's and Yani Tseng's 269, 19-under par in 2010 and 2011 respectively. The LPGA Championship has had eleven wire-to-wire champions on twelve different occasions: Beverly Hanson in 1955, Wright in 1958 and 1961, Judy Kimball in 1962, Kathy Whitworth in 1967, Sandra Post in 1968, Jan Stephenson in 1982, Nancy Lopez in 1985, King in 1992, Se Ri Pak in 1998, Kerr in 2010, and Tseng in 2011. The current champion is Ryu Hae-ran.

== Champions ==
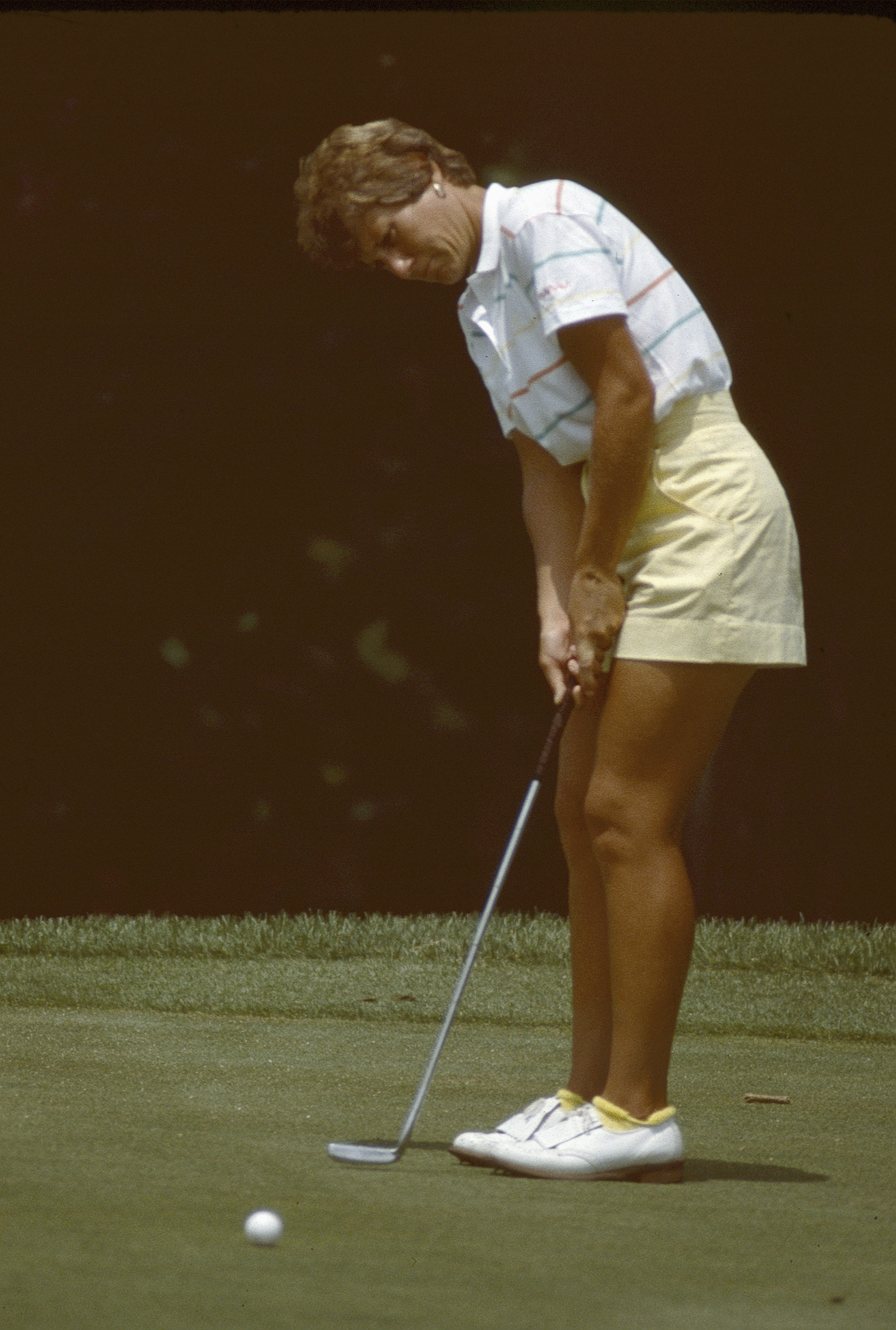
Patty Sheehan was a three-time champion of the event in 1983, 1984 and 1993.

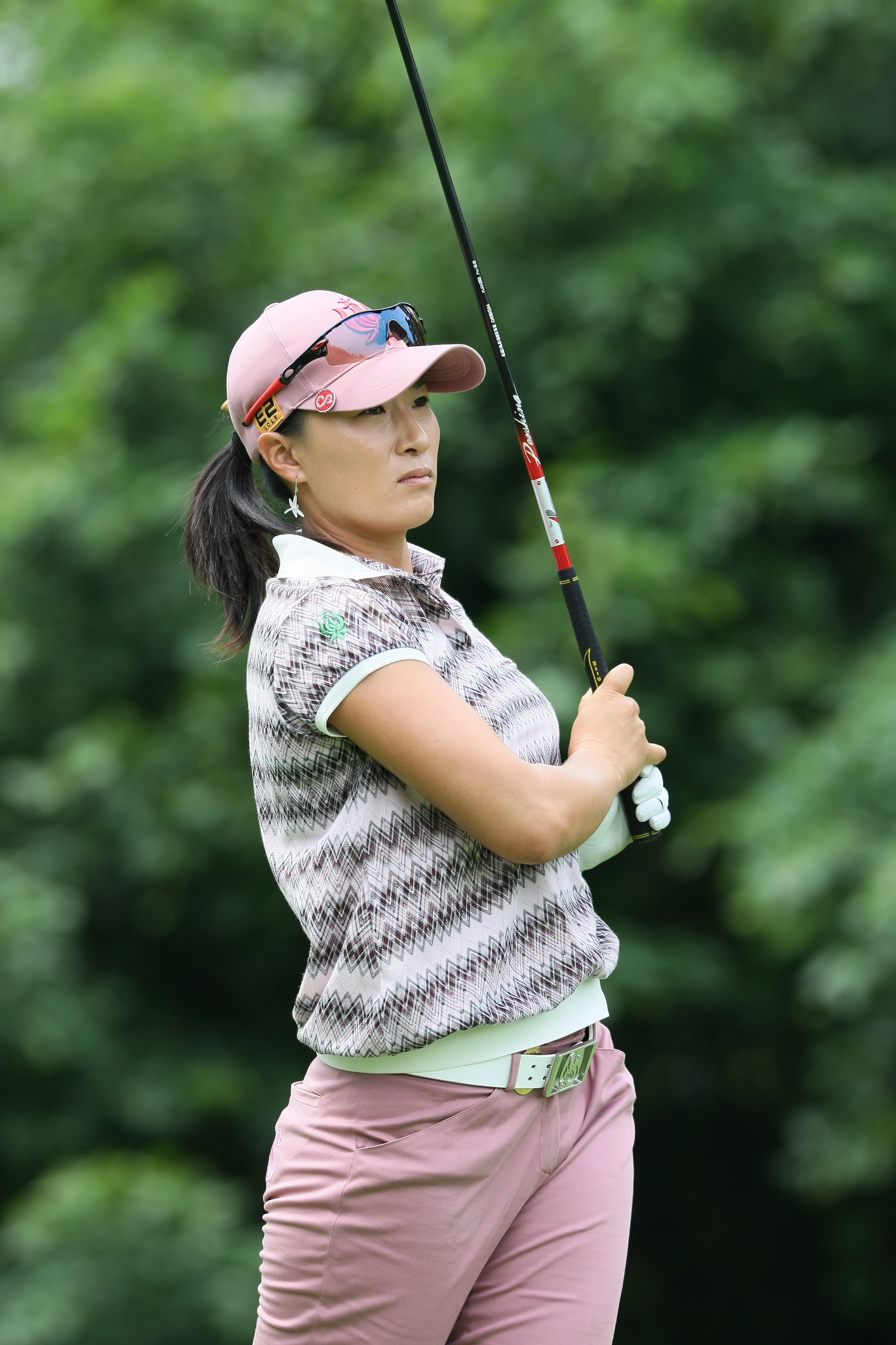
Se Ri Pak is a three-time winner of the event in 1998, 2002 and 2006. She is one of eleven champions to win wire-to-wire with her victory in 1998.

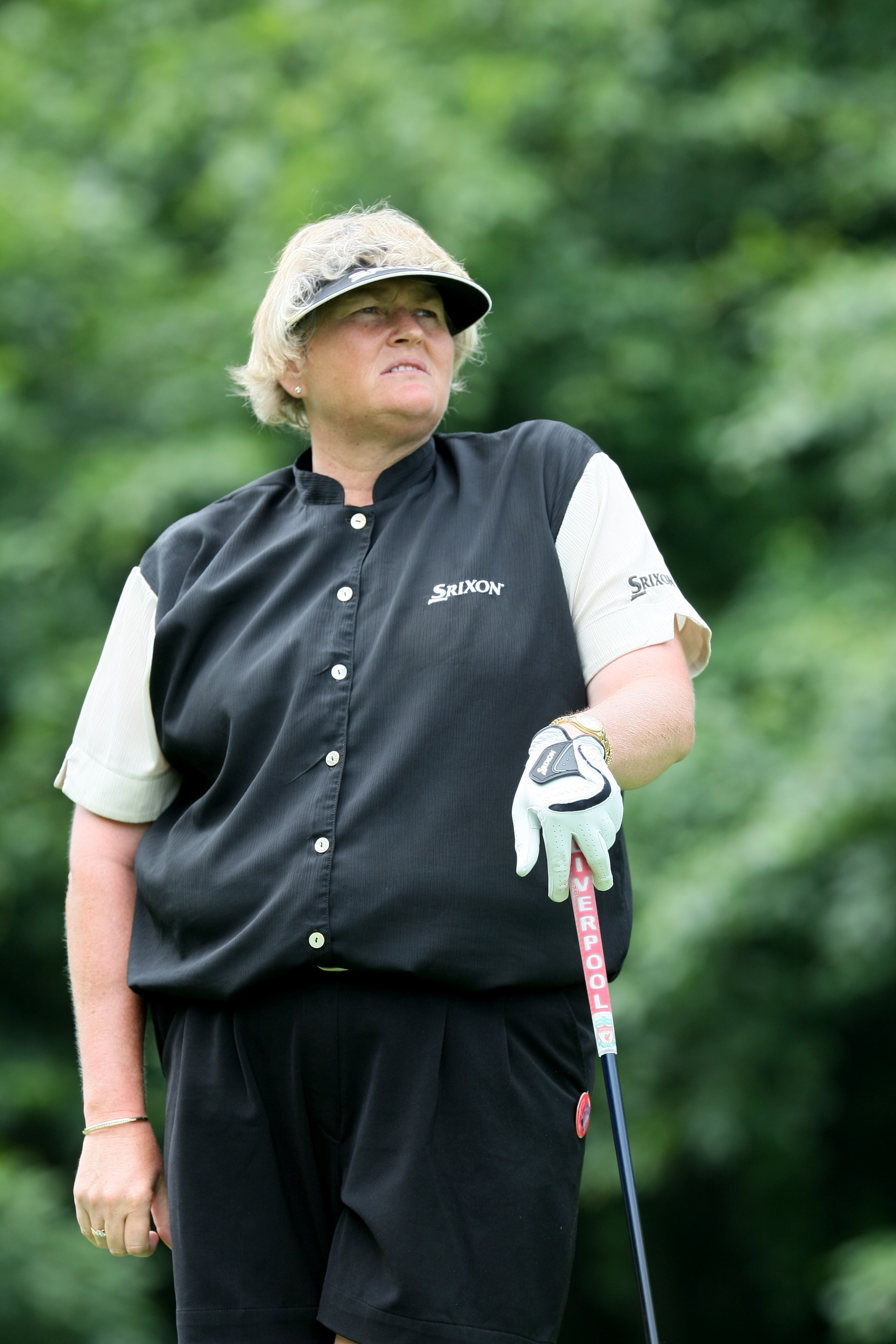
Laura Davies is a two-time champion of the event in 1994 and 1996.

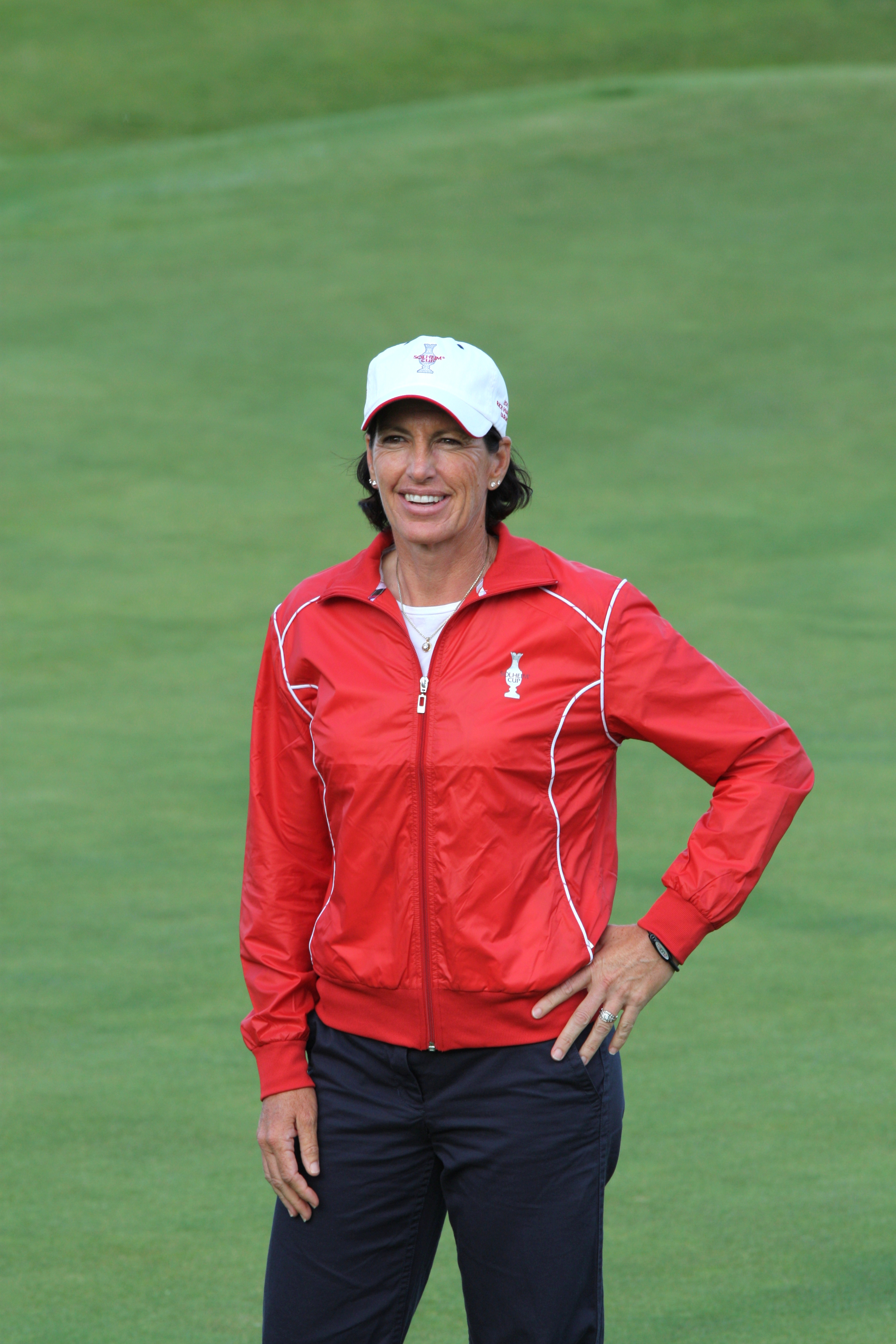
Juli Inkster is only one of four golfers to win repeat titles at the event in 1999 and 2000.

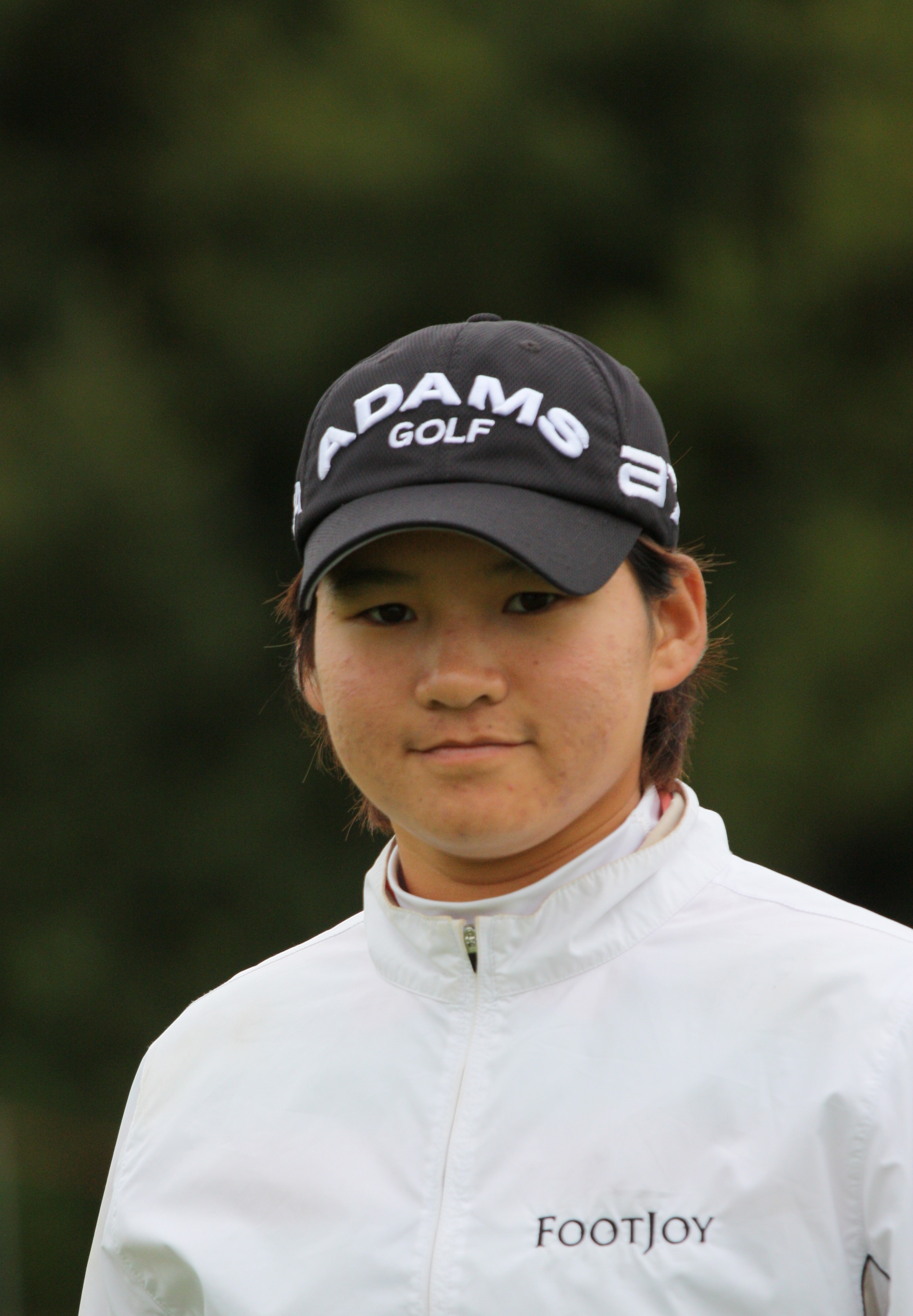
Yani Tseng is the co-holder of the record for most shots under par, and is the champion of this event in 2008 and 2011. She is one of eleven champions to win wire-to-wire with her victory in 2011.

Key

*	Tournament won in a playoff
#	Tournament was won in 54 holes
‡	Wire-to-wire victory

Edition	Year	Country	Champion	Course	Location	Total score	To par^{[b]}	Notes
1st	1955‡	United States	Beverly Hanson	Orchard Ridge Country Club	Fort Wayne, Indiana	220^{[c]}	4&3^{[d]}	
2nd	1956	United States	Marlene Hagge *	Forest Lake Country Club	Detroit, Michigan	291	−9	^{[e]}
3rd	1957	United States	Louise Suggs	Churchill Valley Country Club	Pittsburgh, Pennsylvania	285	+5	
4th	1958‡	United States	Mickey Wright	Churchill Valley Country Club	Pittsburgh, Pennsylvania	288	+8	
5th	1959	United States	Betsy Rawls	Sheraton Hotel Country Club	French Lick, Indiana	288	−8	
6th	1960	United States	Mickey Wright	Sheraton Hotel Country Club	French Lick, Indiana	292	−4	
7th	1961‡	United States	Mickey Wright	Stardust Country Club	Paradise, Nevada	287	+3	
8th	1962‡	United States	Judy Kimball	Stardust Country Club	Paradise, Nevada	282	−2	
9th	1963	United States	Mickey Wright	Stardust Country Club	Paradise, Nevada	294	+10	
10th	1964	United States	Mary Mills	Stardust Country Club	Paradise, Nevada	294	−6	
11th	1965	United States	Sandra Haynie	Stardust Country Club	Paradise, Nevada	279	−5	
12th	1966	United States	Gloria Ehret	Stardust Country Club	Paradise, Nevada	282	−2	
13th	1967‡	United States	Kathy Whitworth	Pleasant Valley Country Club	Sutton, Massachusetts	284	−8	
14th	1968‡	Canada	Sandra Post *	Pleasant Valley Country Club	Sutton, Massachusetts	294	+2	^{[f]}
15th	1969	United States	Betsy Rawls	Concord Golf Course	Kiamesha Lake, New York	293	+1	
16th	1970	United States	Shirley Englehorn *	Pleasant Valley Country Club	Sutton, Massachusetts	285	−7	^{[g]}
17th	1971	United States	Kathy Whitworth	Pleasant Valley Country Club	Sutton, Massachusetts	288	−4	
18th	1972	United States	Kathy Ahern	Pleasant Valley Country Club	Sutton, Massachusetts	293	+1	
19th	1973	United States	Mary Mills	Pleasant Valley Country Club	Sutton, Massachusetts	288	−4	
20th	1974	United States	Sandra Haynie	Pleasant Valley Country Club	Sutton, Massachusetts	288	−4	
21st	1975	United States	Kathy Whitworth	Pine Ridge Golf Course	Baltimore, Maryland	288	−4	
22nd	1976	United States	Betty Burfeindt	Pine Ridge Golf Course	Baltimore, Maryland	287	−5	
23rd	1977	Japan	Hisako Higuchi	Bay Tree Golf Plantation	North Myrtle Beach, South Carolina	279	−9	
24th	1978	United States	Nancy Lopez	Jack Nicklaus Golf Center	Mason, Ohio	275	−13	
25th	1979	United States	Donna Caponi	Jack Nicklaus Golf Center	Mason, Ohio	279	−9	
26th	1980	South Africa	Sally Little	Jack Nicklaus Golf Center	Mason, Ohio	285	−3	
27th	1981	United States	Donna Caponi	Jack Nicklaus Golf Center	Mason, Ohio	280	−8	
28th	1982‡	Australia	Jan Stephenson	Jack Nicklaus Golf Center	Mason, Ohio	280	−9	
29th	1983	United States	Patty Sheehan	Jack Nicklaus Golf Center	Mason, Ohio	280	−9	
30th	1984	United States	Patty Sheehan	Jack Nicklaus Golf Center	Mason, Ohio	272	−16	
31st	1985‡	United States	Nancy Lopez	Jack Nicklaus Golf Center	Mason, Ohio	273	−15	
32nd	1986	United States	Pat Bradley	Jack Nicklaus Golf Center	Mason, Ohio	277	−11	
33rd	1987	United States	Jane Geddes	Jack Nicklaus Golf Center	Mason, Ohio	275	−13	
34th	1988	United States	Sherri Turner	Jack Nicklaus Golf Center	Mason, Ohio	281	−7	
35th	1989	United States	Nancy Lopez	Jack Nicklaus Golf Center	Mason, Ohio	274	−14	
36th	1990	United States	Beth Daniel	Bethesda Country Club	Bethesda, Maryland	280	−4	
37th	1991	United States	Meg Mallon	Bethesda Country Club	Bethesda, Maryland	274	−10	
38th	1992‡	United States	Betsy King	Bethesda Country Club	Bethesda, Maryland	267	−17	
39th	1993	United States	Patty Sheehan	Bethesda Country Club	Bethesda, Maryland	275	−9	
40th	1994	England	Laura Davies	DuPont Country Club	Wilmington, Delaware	279	−5	
41st	1995	United States	Kelly Robbins	DuPont Country Club	Wilmington, Delaware	274	−10	
42nd	1996	England	Laura Davies	DuPont Country Club	Wilmington, Delaware	213 #	E	
43rd	1997	United States	Christa Johnson *	DuPont Country Club	Wilmington, Delaware	281	−3	^{[h]}
44th	1998‡	South Korea	Se Ri Pak	DuPont Country Club	Wilmington, Delaware	273	−11	
45th	1999	United States	Juli Inkster	DuPont Country Club	Wilmington, Delaware	268	−16	
46th	2000	United States	Juli Inkster *	DuPont Country Club	Wilmington, Delaware	281	−3	^{[i]}
47th	2001	Australia	Karrie Webb	DuPont Country Club	Wilmington, Delaware	270	−14	
48th	2002	South Korea	Se Ri Pak	DuPont Country Club	Wilmington, Delaware	279	−5	
49th	2003	Sweden	Annika Sörenstam *	DuPont Country Club	Wilmington, Delaware	278	−6	^{[j]}
50th	2004	Sweden	Annika Sörenstam	DuPont Country Club	Wilmington, Delaware	271	−13	
51st	2005	Sweden	Annika Sörenstam	Bulle Rock Golf Course	Havre de Grace, Maryland	277	−11	
52nd	2006	South Korea	Se Ri Pak *	Bulle Rock Golf Course	Havre de Grace, Maryland	280	−8	^{[k]}
53rd	2007	Norway	Suzann Pettersen	Bulle Rock Golf Course	Havre de Grace, Maryland	274	−14	
54th	2008	Taiwan	Yani Tseng *	Bulle Rock Golf Course	Havre de Grace, Maryland	276	−12	^{[l]}
55th	2009	Sweden	Anna Nordqvist	Bulle Rock Golf Course	Havre de Grace, Maryland	273	−15	
56th	2010‡	United States	Cristie Kerr	Locust Hill Country Club	Pittsford, New York	269	−19	
57th	2011‡	Taiwan	Yani Tseng	Locust Hill Country Club	Pittsford, New York	269	−19	
58th	2012	China	Shanshan Feng	Locust Hill Country Club	Pittsford, New York	283	−5	
59th	2013	South Korea	Inbee Park *	Locust Hill Country Club	Pittsford, New York	282	−6	
60th	2014	South Korea	Inbee Park *	Monroe Golf Club	Pittsford, New York	277	−11	
61st	2015	South Korea	Inbee Park	Westchester Country Club	Harrison, New York	273	−19	
62nd	2016	Canada	Brooke Henderson*	Sahalee Country Club	Sammamish, Washington	278	−6	
63rd	2017	United States	Danielle Kang	Olympia Fields Country Club	Olympia Fields, Illinois	271	−13	
64th	2018	South Korea	Park Sung-hyun*	Kemper Lakes Golf Club	Long Grove, Illinois	278	−10	
65th	2019	Australia	Hannah Green	Hazeltine National Golf Club	Chaska, Minnesota	279	−9	
66th	2020	South Korea	Kim Sei-young	Aronimink Golf Club	Newtown Square, Pennsylvania	266	−14	
67th	2021	United States	Nelly Korda	Atlanta Athletic Club	Johns Creek, Georgia	269	−19	
68th	2022‡	South Korea	Chun In-gee	Congressional Country Club	Bethesda, Maryland	283	−5	
69th	2023	China	Yin Ruoning	Baltusrol Golf Club	Springfield, New Jersey	276	−8	
70th	2024	South Korea	Amy Yang	Sahalee Country Club	Sammamish, Washington	281	−7	
71st	2025	Australia	Minjee Lee	PGA Frisco	Frisco, Texas	284	−4	
72nd	2026	South Korea	Ryu Hae-ran	Hazeltine National Golf Club	Chaska, Minnesota	275	–13	

== Multiple champions ==
This table lists the golfers who have won more than one LPGA Championship. Champions who won in consecutive years are indicated by the years with italics*.

Key

‡	Career Grand Slam winners
T2	Tied for second place
T8	Tied for eighth place

Rank	Country	Golfer	Total	Years
1	United States	Mickey Wright ‡	4	1958, 1960, 1961*, 1963
T2	United States	Kathy Whitworth	3	1967, 1971, 1975
T2	United States	Nancy Lopez	3	1978, 1985, 1989
T2	United States	Patty Sheehan	3	1983, 1984*, 1993
T2	Sweden	Annika Sörenstam ‡	3	2003, 2004*, 2005*
T2	South Korea	Se Ri Pak	3	1998, 2002, 2006
T2	South Korea	Inbee Park	3	2013, 2014*, 2015*
T8	United States	Betsy Rawls	2	1959, 1969
T8	United States	Mary Mills	2	1964, 1973
T8	United States	Sandra Haynie	2	1965, 1974
T8	United States	Donna Caponi	2	1979, 1981
T8	England	Laura Davies	2	1994, 1996
T8	United States	Juli Inkster ‡	2	1999, 2000*
T8	Taiwan	Yani Tseng	2	2008, 2011

== Champions by nationality ==
This table lists the total number of titles won by golfers of each nationality.

Key

T5	Tied for fifth place
T9	Tied for ninth place

Rank	Nationality	Wins	Winners	First title	Last title
1	United States	42	28	1955	2021
2	South Korea	11	7	1998	2026
T3	Australia	4	4	1982	2025
T3	Sweden	4	2	2003	2009
T5	Canada	2	2	1968	2016
T5	China	2	2	2012	2023
T5	England	2	1	1994	1996
T5	Taiwan	2	1	2008	2011
T9	Japan	1	1	1977	1977
T9	South Africa	1	1	1980	1980
T9	Norway	1	1	2007	2007

== See also ==
- Chronological list of LPGA major golf champions
- List of LPGA major championship winning golfers

== Notes ==
- ^{a} This tournament has had several name changes, which are the following: 1955–86 LPGA Championship, 1987–93 Mazda LPGA Championship, 1994–2000 McDonald's LPGA Championship, 2001–03 McDonald's LPGA Championship presented by AIG, 2004–09 McDonald's LPGA Championship presented by Coca-Cola, 2010 LPGA Championship presented by Wegmans, 2011–14 Wegmans LPGA Championship, and 2015–present KPMG Women's PGA Championship.
- ^{b} Par is a predetermined number of strokes that a golfer should require to complete a hole, a round (the sum of the total pars of the played holes), or a tournament (the sum of the total pars of each round). E stands for even, which means the tournament was completed in the predetermined number of strokes.
- ^{c} The first two days over three rounds were conducted in stroke play.
- ^{d} The last day was a 36-hole final for the championship in match play.
- ^{b} Marlene Hagge won in a sudden death playoff over Patty Berg.
- ^{c} Sandra Post won in an 18-hole playoff over Kathy Whitworth.
- ^{d} Shirley Englehorn won in an 18-hole playoff over Kathy Whitworth.
- ^{e} Christa Johnson won in a sudden death playoff over Leta Lindley.
- ^{f} Juli Inkster won in a sudden death playoff over Stefania Croce.
- ^{g} Annika Sörenstam won in a sudden death playoff over Grace Park.
- ^{h} Se Ri Pak won in a sudden death playoff over Karrie Webb.
- ^{i} Yani Tseng won in a sudden death playoff over Maria Hjorth.
