= 1971 LPGA Tour =

Golf tour season

1971 LPGA Tour season
- Duration: February 18, 1971 – October 17, 1971
- Number of official events: 20
- Most wins: 5 (United States) Kathy Whitworth
- Money leader: (United States) Kathy Whitworth
- Player of the Year: (United States) Kathy Whitworth
- Vare Trophy: (United States) Kathy Whitworth
- Rookie of the Year: (South Africa) Sally Little

The 1971 LPGA Tour was the 22nd season since the LPGA Tour officially began in 1950. The season ran from February 18 to October 17. The season consisted of 20 official money events. Kathy Whitworth won the most tournaments, five. She also led the money list with earnings of $41,181.

The season saw the first $10,000 first prize at the Sears Women's World Classic won by Ruth Jessen. There were four first-time winners in 1971: Pam Barnett, Jan Ferraris, Pam Higgins, and Sandra Palmer.

The tournament results and award winners are listed below.

== Tournament results ==
The following table shows all the official money events for the 1971 season. "Date" is the ending date of the tournament. The numbers in parentheses after the winners' names are the number of wins they had on the tour up to and including that event. Majors are shown in bold.

Date	Tournament	Location	Winner	Score	Purse ($)	1st prize ($)
Feb 21	Sears Women's World Classic	Florida	(United States) Ruth Jessen (11)	220 (+1)	60,000	10,000
Mar 21	Orange Blossom Classic	Florida	(United States) Jan Ferraris (1)	218 (+2)	20,000	3,000
Apr 18	Raleigh Golf Classic	North Carolina	(United States) Kathy Whitworth (56)	212 (−4)	20,000	3,000
Apr 25	Burdine's Invitational	Florida	(United States) Sandra Haynie (20)	219 (−3)	30,000	4,500
May 2	Dallas Civitan Open	Texas	(United States) Sandra Haynie (21)	201 (−12)	31,500	4,725
May 9	San Antonio Alamo Open	Texas	(United States) Sandra Haynie (22)	206 (−13)	20,000	3,000
May 16	Sealy LPGA Classic	Nevada	(United States) Sandra Palmer (1)	289 (−3)	50,000	10,000
May 23	Suzuki Golf Internationale	California	(United States) Kathy Whitworth (57)	217 (+1)	38,000	5,700
Jun 6	Lady Carling Open	Maryland	(United States) Kathy Whitworth (58)	210 (−9)	25,000	3,750
Jun 13	**Eve-LPGA Championship**	Massachusetts	(United States) **Kathy Whitworth (59)**	288 (−4)	53,000	7,950
Jun 20	Heritage Open	Connecticut	(United States) Sandra Palmer (2)	211 (−8)	25,000	3,750
Jun 27	**U.S. Women's Open**	Pennsylvania	(United States) **JoAnne Carner (3)**	288 (E)	31,000	5,000
Jul 11	George Washington Classic	Pennsylvania	(United States) Jane Blalock (2)	208 (−11)	25,000	3,750
Jul 25	O'Sullivan Ladies Open	Virginia	(United States) Judy Kimball (3)	211 (−4)	20,000	3,000
Aug 1	Bluegrass Invitational	Kentucky	(United States) JoAnne Carner (4)	210 (−6)	25,000	3,750
Aug 8	Lady Pepsi Open	Georgia	(United States) Jane Blalock (3)	214 (−5)	20,000	3,000
Aug 15	Len Immke Buick Open	Ohio	(United States) Sandra Haynie (23)	206 (−10)	25,000	3,750
Aug 22	Southgate Open	Kansas	(United States) Pam Barnett (1)	210 (−6)	20,000	3,000
Sep 26	Lincoln-Mercury Open	California	(United States) Pam Higgins (1)	215 (−4)	25,000	3,750
Oct 17	Quality First Classic	Texas	(United States) Judy Rankin (5)	214 (−5)	20,000	3,000

== Awards ==
Award	Winner	Country
Money winner	Kathy Whitworth (6)	United States
Scoring leader (Vare Trophy)	Kathy Whitworth (6)	United States
Player of the Year	Kathy Whitworth (5)	United States
Rookie of the Year	Sally Little	South Africa
