= 1975 LPGA Tour =

Golf tour season

1975 LPGA Tour season
- Duration: January 31, 1975 – November 23, 1975
- Number of official events: 27
- Most wins: 4 (United States) Sandra Haynie, (United States) Carol Mann
- Money leader: (United States) Sandra Palmer
- Player of the Year: (United States) Sandra Palmer
- Vare Trophy: (United States) JoAnne Carner
- Rookie of the Year: (United States) Amy Alcott

The 1975 LPGA Tour was the 26th season since the LPGA Tour officially began in 1950. The season ran from January 31 to November 23. The season consisted of 27 official money events. Sandra Haynie and Carol Mann won the most tournaments, four each. Sandra Palmer led the money list with earnings of $76,374.

There were five first-time winners in 1975: Amy Alcott, Maria Astrologes, Susie McAllister, Mary Bea Porter, and Jo Ann Washam.

The tournament results and award winners are listed below.

== Tournament results ==
The following table shows all the official money events for the 1975 season. "Date" is the ending date of the tournament. The numbers in parentheses after the winners' names are the number of wins they had on the tour up to and including that event. Majors are shown in bold.

Date	Tournament	Location	Winner	Score	Purse ($)	1st prize ($)
Feb 2	Burdine's Invitational	Florida	(United States) Donna Caponi (6)	208	40,000	5,700
Feb 9	Naples Lely Classic	Florida	(United States) Sandra Haynie (36)	211	40,000	5,700
Feb 23	Orange Blossom Classic	Florida	(United States) Amy Alcott (1)	207	35,000	5,000
Mar 23	Bing Crosby International Classic	Mexico	(United States) Sue Roberts (3)	214	45,000	6,400
Mar 29	Karsten-Ping Open	Arizona	(United States) Jane Blalock (12)	209	70,000	10,000
Apr 20	Colgate-Dinah Shore Winner's Circle	California	(United States) Sandra Palmer (10)	283	180,000	32,000
Apr 27	Charity Golf Classic	Texas	(United States) Sandra Haynie (37)	212	45,000	6,400
May 4	Birmingham Classic	Alabama	(United States) Maria Astrologes (1)	210	40,000	5,700
May 11	Lady Tara Classic	Georgia	(United States) Donna Caponi (7)	214	40,000	5,700
May 25	American Defender Classic	North Carolina	(United States) JoAnne Carner (11)	206	40,000	5,700
Jun 1	**LPGA Championship**	Maryland	(United States) **Kathy Whitworth (73)**	288	55,000	8,000
Jun 8	Girl Talk Classic	New York	(United States) JoAnne Carner (12)	213	50,000	7,000
Jun 15	Lawson's LPGA Classic	Ohio	(United States) Carol Mann (35)	217	50,000	7,000
Jun 22	Hoosier Classic	Indiana	(United States) Betsy Cullen (3)	211	40,000	5,700
Jun 29	Peter Jackson Classic	Canada	(United States) JoAnne Carner (13)	214	60,000	12,000
Jul 6	Wheeling Ladies Classic	West Virginia	(United States) Susie McAllister (1)	212	40,000	5,700
Jul 13	Borden Classic	Ohio	(United States) Carol Mann (36)	209	65,000	9,200
Jul 20	**U.S. Women's Open**	New Jersey	(United States) **Sandra Palmer (11)**	295	55,000	8,044
Jul 27	George Washington Ladies Classic	Pennsylvania	(United States) Carol Mann (37)	206	40,000	5,700
Aug 17	Patty Berg Classic	Minnesota	(United States) Jo Ann Washam (1)	206	45,000	6,400
Aug 24	National Jewish Hospital Open	Colorado	(United States) Judy Rankin (13)	207	40,000	5,700
Sep 7	Dallas Civitan Open	Texas	(United States) Carol Mann (38)	208	40,000	6,200
Sep 14	Southgate Open	Kansas	(United States) Kathy Whitworth (74)	213	40,000	5,700
Sep 21	Portland Ladies Classic	Oregon	(United States) Jo Ann Washam (2)	215	40,000	5,700
Oct 26	Golf Inns of America	California	(United States) Mary Bea Porter (1)	287	40,000	5,700
Nov 16	Jacksonville Ladies Open	Florida	(United States) Sandra Haynie (38)	223	50,000	7,000
Nov 23	Greater Ft. Myers Classic	Florida	(United States) Sandra Haynie (39)	210	40,000	5,700

== LPGA Tour settles Jane Blalock lawsuit ==
The LPGA Tour dropped its appeal and made settlement in the lawsuit Jane Blalock filed against the Tour after they suspended her for one year due to cheating allegations that began at the 1972 Bluegrass Invitational where Blalock was disqualified. Blalock, with the help of a court order, was allowed to continue playing LPGA tournaments while her suit was being resolved. In August 1974, a court had ruled in favor of Blalock and awarded her $4,500 in damages. Those damages were subsequently tripled in March 1975. The LPGA was also ordered to pay Blalock's legal fees, which totaled $95,303.

After settling with Blalock, the LPGA Tour adopted a formal organization which included having a commissioner.

== Awards ==
Award	Winner	Country
Money winner	Sandra Palmer	United States
Scoring leader (Vare Trophy)	JoAnne Carner (2)	United States
Player of the Year	Sandra Palmer	United States
Rookie of the Year	Amy Alcott	United States
