= Betsy Cullen =

American professional golfer (born 1938)

Personal information
- Full name: Mary Elizabeth Cullen
- Nationality: United States
- Born: August 14, 1938 (age 88) Tulsa, Oklahoma, U.S.
- Height: 5 ft 4 in (1.63 m)

Career
- Sport: Golf
- College: University of Oklahoma
- Turned professional: 1962
- Former tour: LPGA Tour (1965–1979)
- Professional wins: 3

Number of wins by tour
- LPGA Tour: 3

Best results in LPGA major championships
- Western Open: T11: 1967
- Titleholders C'ship: T12: 1965
- Women's PGA C'ship: 7th: 1967
- U.S. Women's Open: T12: 1972
- du Maurier Classic: 62nd: 1979

Mary Elizabeth "Betsy" Cullen (born August 14, 1938) is an American professional golfer who played on the LPGA Tour.

Cullen was born in Tulsa, Oklahoma. She graduated from University of Oklahoma in 1960 with a degree in Physical Education. She turned professional in 1962 and became a teaching pro. In 1965, she joined the LPGA Tour.

Cullen won three times on the LPGA Tour between 1972 and 1975.

After her playing career, Cullen became a club professional.

== Professional wins (3) ==
=== LPGA Tour wins (3) ===
No.	Date	Tournament	Winning score	Margin of victory	Runner-up
1	Mar 26, 1972	Sears Women's World Classic	−1 (72)	1 stroke	(United States) Kathy Whitworth
2	Apr 1, 1973	Alamo Ladies Classic	−1 (69-73-76=218)	2 strokes	(United States) Betty Burfeindt
3	Jun 22, 1975	Hoosier Classic	−5 (71-70-70=211)	1 stroke	(United States) Judy Rankin
