= 1975 U.S. Women's Open =

Coordinates: 39.370°N 74.542°W

Tournament information
- Dates: July 17–20, 1975
- Location: Northfield, New Jersey
- Course: Atlantic City Country Club
- Organized by: USGA
- Tour: LPGA Tour

Statistics
- Par: 72
- Length: 6,165 yards (5,637 m)
- Field: 155 players, 50 after cut
- Cut: 158 (+14)
- Prize fund: $55,000
- Winner's share: $8,045

Champion
- (United States) Sandra Palmer
- 295 (+7)

Location in the United States
Location in New Jersey

The 1975 U.S. Women's Open was the 30th U.S. Women's Open, held July 17–20 at Atlantic City Country Club in Northfield, New Jersey, west of Atlantic City.

This champion was Sandra Palmer at 295 (+7), four strokes ahead of the three runners-up, JoAnne Carner, Sandra Post, and amateur Nancy Lopez. Age 18 and a recent high school graduate, Lopez co-led after 36 holes at 147 (+3).

== Final leaderboard ==
Sunday, July 21, 1974

Place	Player	Score	To par	Money ($)
1	(United States) Sandra Palmer	78-74-71-72=295	+7	8,045
T2	(United States) JoAnne Carner	73-77-74-75=299	+11	4,045
T2	(Canada) Sandra Post	74-73-76-76=299	+11	4,045
T2	(United States) Nancy Lopez (a)	73-74-77-75=299	+11	0
5	(United States) Susie McAllister	79-75-74-72=300	+12	2,445
6	(United States) Sandra Haynie	74-77-74-76=301	+13	2,245
7	(United States) Kathy Whitworth	76-76-75-75=302	+14	2,045
8	(United States) Debbie Austin	76-76-72-79=303	+15	1,945
T9	(Canada) Jocelyne Bourassa	77-76-75-76=304	+16	1,745
T9	(United States) Judy Rankin	72-77-79-76=304	+16	1,745
T9	(South Africa) Sally Little	80-70-73-81=304	+16	1,745
