= 1966 Titleholders Championship =

Golf tournament in Augusta, Georgia, US

Tournament information
- Dates: November 24–27, 1966
- Location: Augusta, Georgia; 33.483°N 82.011°W
- Course: Augusta Country Club
- Tour: LPGA Tour
- Format: Stroke play – 72 holes

Statistics
- Par: 72
- Length: 6,351 yards (5,807 m)
- Prize fund: $10,000
- Winner's share: $1,500

Champion
- (United States) Kathy Whitworth
- 291 (+3)
- Location in the United States Location in Georgia

The 1966 Titleholders Championship was the 27th Titleholders Championship, held November 24–27 at Augusta Country Club in Augusta, Georgia.

Reigning champion Kathy Whitworth successfully defended her title and won the second of her six major titles, two strokes ahead of runners-up Judy Kimball and Mary Mills.

It was Whitworth's 28th victory on the LPGA Tour and ninth of the 1966 season.

Mills was the 54-hole leader at 217 (+1), with Whitworth and Kimball a stroke back.

This was the last time the championship was held in Augusta; it took a hiatus and resumed six years later for one time only in 1972 in North Carolina.

== Final leaderboard ==
Sunday, November 27, 1966

Place	Player	Score	To par	Money ($)
1	(United States) Kathy Whitworth	74-70-74-73=291	+3	1,500
T2	(United States) Judy Kimball	73-72-73-75=293	+5	1,100
T2	(United States) Mary Mills	73-71-73-76=293	+5	1,100
4	(United States) Judy Rankin	75-76-70-73=294	+6	800
5	(United States) Betsy Rawls	77-73-72-74=296	+8	675
6	(United States) Marilynn Smith	75-78-74-70=297	+9	560
7	(United States) Marlene Hagge	74-72-78-74=298	+10	480
8	(United States) Shirley Englehorn	74-74-74-77=299	+11	420
9	(United States) Sandra Spuzich	75-77-75-74=301	+13	370
10	(United States) Peggy Wilson	77-79-75-72=303	+15	330
