= Gerda Boykin =

German professional golfer

Personal information
- Full name: Gerda Whalen Boykin
- Nationality: West Germany
- Born: Baden-Baden, Germany
- Height: 5 in 2 ft

Career
- Sport: Golf
- Status: Professional
- Current tour: LPGA Tour (joined 1968)

Best results in LPGA major championships
- Women's PGA C'ship: 3rd: 1968
- U.S. Women's Open: 8th: 1968

Achievements and awards
- Golf Digest Most Improved Female Professional Golfer: 1968

Gerda Boykin (née Schleeh) is Germany's first female professional golfer. She competed full time on the LPGA Tour from 1968 to 1977, where she was runner-up three times and finished 3rd at the 1968 LPGA Championship.

== Early life ==
Boykin grew up in Baden-Baden in the aftermath of World War II. After becoming interested in the sport while caddying for American military personnel, she started practicing golf at age 10 under Paul Henkel.

At 19, she became the first female German professional golfer. She worked as a golf instructor assisting Henkel, and at 21 she became head pro. Forced to enter men's tournaments, she finished fourth in the German PGA Championship. She also captained the German amateur teams in European competition.

In 1961, she married American golf instructor Dan Whalen and moved to Illinois.

== LPGA Tour ==
Boykin started playing on the LPGA Tour in 1961 but played a very limited schedule until 1968. Encouraged by her solo third finish at the 1968 LPGA Championship, one stroke away from joining the playoff between Sandra Post and Kathy Whitworth, she joined the tour full time. Later that year, she finished 8th at the 1968 U.S. Women's Open. At the 1969 U.S. Women's Open she aced the 165-yard 7th hole with a five-wood, a shot that five weeks earlier would have earned her the Janet Olson Hole-in-One Award and $1,000, instead the check went to a foundation for the blind. It was only the third ace in the tournament's history. She was named "most improved" golfer in 1968 by Golf Digest, alongside Bob Lunn.

In 1970, she tied for 8th place at the 1970 LPGA Championship, and in 1972 was one of the 40 players in the inaugural Colgate-Dinah Shore Winner's Circle, now the Chevron Championship. At the 1976 LPGA Championship, she shared the lead at the halfway point.

Boykin lost a playoff to Judy Rankin at the 1973 GAC Classic in Tucson. She posted three-second place finishes during her LPGA career, including at the 1973 and 1975 Southgate Ladies Open in Prairie Village, Kansas, both times behind Kathy Whitworth. 1977 was her last season of full-time competition, and she started cutting back her schedule again. A fourth place tie in the 1984 Potamkin Cadillac Classic marked her best showing after 1977.

== Personal life ==
Boykin was born Gerda Schleeh and competed as Gerda Whalen until she married Bill Boykin in 1970.

== Playoff record ==
=== LPGA Tour playoff record (0–1) ===
| No. | Year | Tournament | Opponents | Result |
|---|---|---|---|---|
| 1 | 1973 | GAC Classic | (United States) Judy Rankin (United States) Sandra Palmer | Boykin eliminated by par on first hole Rankin won with par on third extra hole |
