= Patty Berg Classic =

Golf tournament

The Patty Berg Classic was a women's professional golf tournament in Minnesota on the LPGA Tour from 1973 to 1980. Played at Keller Golf Course in Maplewood, a suburb north of St. Paul, the tournament was named in honor of hall of famer Patty Berg.

== Winners ==
Patty Berg Golf Classic

- 1980 Beth Daniel (2)

Patty Berg Classic

- 1979 Beth Daniel
- 1978 Shelley Hamlin
- 1977 Bonnie Lauer
- 1976 Kathy Whitworth
- 1975 Jo Ann Washam

St. Paul Open

- 1974 JoAnne Carner
- 1973 Sandra Palmer

== See also ==
- Patty Berg Classic (Massachusetts) - an unrelated one-time LPGA Tour event played in June 1969 in Sutton, Massachusetts.
