= Glen Echo Country Club =

Golf club in Missouri, U.S.

Coordinates: 38°42′04″N 90°18′02″W

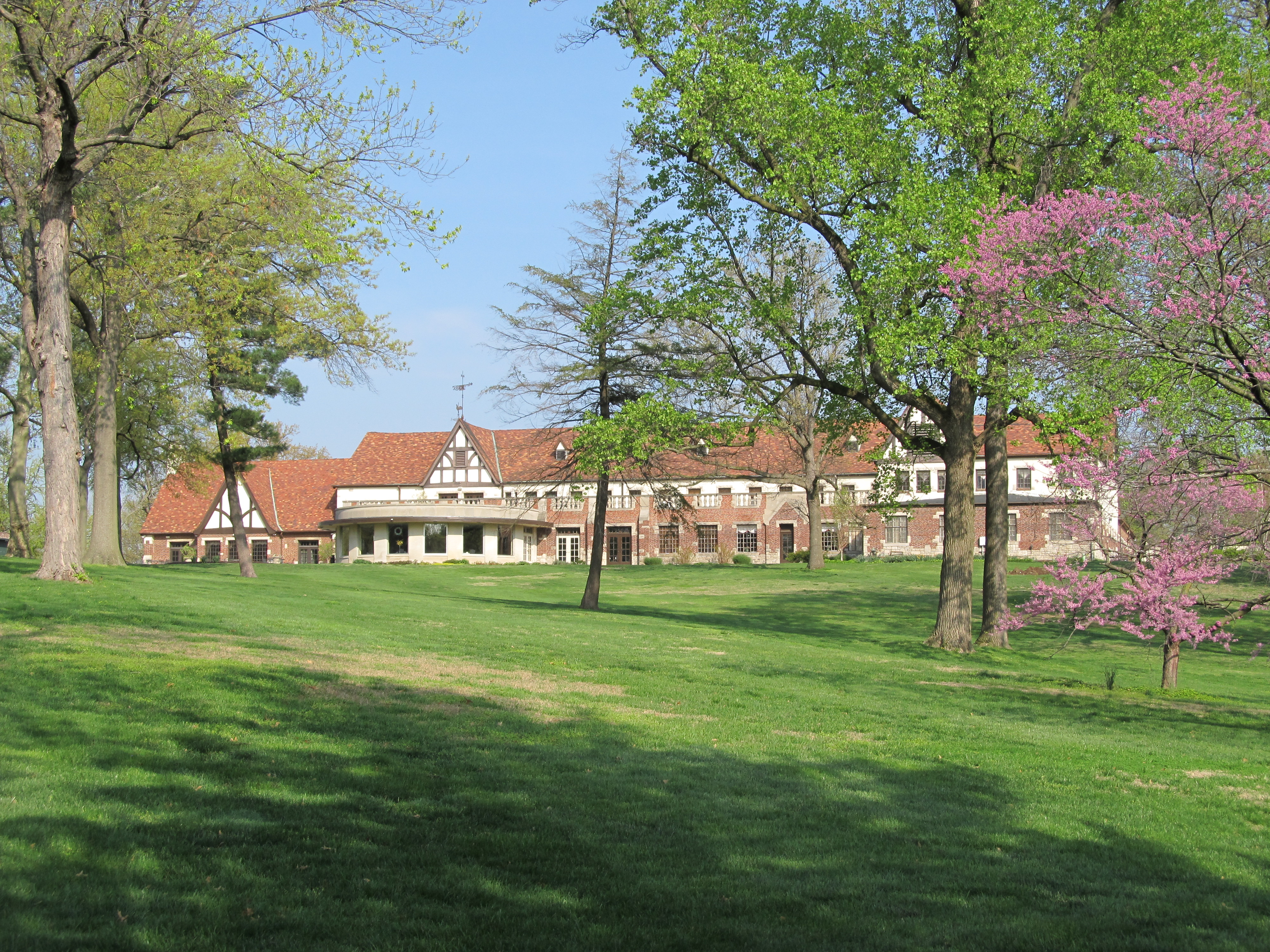
- Clubhouse, April 2012
- Interactive map of Glen Echo Country Club

Club information
- Location: Normandy, St. Louis County, near St. Louis, Missouri, USA
- Established: 1901
- Type: Private
- Tota holes: 18
- Tournaments: 1904 Summer Olympics
- Website: Official website
- Designed by: James Foulis
- Par: 71
- Length: 6382 yards Longest hole is #4 - 538 yards

Glen Echo County Club, located in Normandy, Missouri, is a private golf club that was founded by George McGrew and his son-in-law, Albert Bond Lambert. Completed in 1901, it was the first 18-hole golf course in St. Louis and the first golf course constructed west of the Mississippi River. The course hosted the golf events for the 1904 Summer Olympics.

== History ==
The club was designed by James Foulis from Scotland, winner of the 1896 U.S. Open, and built by him and his brother Robert. It opened on May 25, 1901 and hosted the golf events for the 1904 Summer Olympics. The LPGA Tour visited the course, hosting the St. Louis Women's Invitational in 1954, 1964, and 1970.

== Hole information ==
All information about the holes are from this source.

Hole #	Name	Par	Yards
1	Lilac Way	4	380
2	The Valley	4	432
3	Spirits	4	357
4	Long Drive	5	538
5	Roadway	4	277
6	The Glen	3	176
7	Boomerang	4	468
8	Alps	5	472
9	Fountain	3	164

Hole #	Name	Par	Yards
10	Hard Scrabble	5	510
11	Hillside	3	244
12	Westward Ho	4	406
13	Echo	4	353
14	Dewdrop	3	136
15	The Lake	4	360
16	Punch Bowl	4	434
17	Old Hickory	4	384
18	Sweet Home	4	411

== Other amenities ==
The course offers a short range tee and a separate Zoysia long range tee. It also has driving range, a chipping green, and a practice bunker. It has a bent grass green that allows for walking and golf carts on the course. The fairways for the course are Zoysia grass. The course's bunkers were renovated in the fall of 2012 by Goalby Golf Design and the Glen Echo staff, resulting in the bunkers being modified to the old style flat bottomed bunker.
