= Lady Carling Eastern Open =

Golf tournament formerly on the LPGA Tour

The Lady Carling Eastern Open was a golf tournament on the LPGA Tour from 1962 to 1966 played at the Pleasant Valley Country Club in Sutton, Massachusetts, United States.

== Winners ==
Lady Carling Open

- 1966 Kathy Whitworth

Lady Carling Eastern Open

- 1965 No tournament
- 1964 Mickey Wright
- 1963 Shirley Englehorn (2)

Eastern Open

- 1962 Shirley Englehorn

== See also ==
- Lady Carling Open - another LPGA Tour event, played in Maryland from 1964 to 1973
- Danbury Lady Carling Open - another LPGA Tour event, played in Connecticut in 1969
