= Jo Ann Washam =

American professional golfer (1950–2019)

Personal information
- Nationality: United States
- Born: May 24, 1950 Auburn, Washington, U.S.
- Died: December 6, 2019 (aged 69) King County, Washington, U.S.
- Height: 5 ft 3 in (1.60 m)

Career
- Sport: Golf
- College: Washington State University
- Turned professional: 1973
- Former tour: LPGA Tour (1973–1989)
- Professional wins: 5

Number of wins by tour
- LPGA Tour: 3
- Other: 2

Best results in LPGA major championships
- Chevron Championship: T9: 1983
- Women's PGA C'ship: 3rd: 1975
- U.S. Women's Open: T5: 1979
- du Maurier Classic: T6: 1985

Jo Ann Washam (May 24, 1950 – December 6, 2019) was an American professional golfer who played on the LPGA Tour.

== Career ==
Washam was born in Auburn, Washington in 1950. She played college golf and basketball at Washington State University, where she also joined the women's fraternity Alpha Gamma Delta.

Washam won three times on the LPGA Tour between 1975 and 1979.

Washam died on December 6, 2019.

== Awards and honors ==
In 1982, Washam was elected to the Washington State University Athletic Hall of Fame.

== Professional wins (5) ==
=== LPGA Tour wins (3) ===
No.	Date	Tournament	Winning score	Margin of victory	Runner(s)-up
1	Aug 17, 1975	Patty Berg Classic	−13 (69-69-68=206)	4 strokes	(Canada) Jocelyne Bourassa (United States) JoAnne Carner
2	Sep 21, 1975	Portland Ladies Classic	−4 (71-75-69=215)	1 stroke	(United States) Sandra Haynie
3	Sep 3, 1979	Rail Charity Classic	−13 (69-71-68-67=275)	1 stroke	(Argentina) Silvia Bertolaccini

LPGA Tour playoff record (0–1)

No.	Year	Tournament	Opponents	Result
1	1979	Coca-Cola Classic	(United States) Bonnie Bryant (United States) Nancy Lopez (United States) Hollis Stacy (United States) Mickey Wright	Lopez defeated Wright with birdie on second extra hole Bryant, Stacy, and Washam eliminated by birdie on first hole

=== Other wins (2) ===
- 1976 Pepsi-Cola Mixed Team Championship (with Chi-Chi Rodríguez)
- 1979 Portland Ping Team Championship (with Nancy Lopez)
