= 1972 U.S. Women's Open =

Coordinates: 40.958°N 73.754°W

Tournament information
- Dates: June 29 – July 2, 1972
- Location: Mamaroneck, New York
- Courses: Winged Foot Golf Club, East Course
- Organized by: USGA
- Tour: LPGA Tour
- Format: Stroke play – 72 holes

Statistics
- Par: 72
- Length: 6,226 yards (5,693 m)
- Field: 150 players, 53 after cut
- Cut: 161 (+17)
- Prize fund: $40,000
- Winner's share: $6,000

Champion
- (United States) Susie Berning
- 299 (+11)

Location in the United States
Location in New York

The 1972 U.S. Women's Open was the 27th U.S. Women's Open, held June 29 to July 2 at the East Course of Winged Foot Golf Club in Mamaroneck, New York.

Susie Berning won the second of her three U.S. Women's Open titles, a stroke ahead of runners-up Kathy Ahern, Pam Barnett, and Judy Rankin. Berning opened with a 79 (+7) and started the final round at 228 (+12), four strokes behind 54-hole leader Barnett. Berning carded a one-under 71 for the third of her four major wins. Defending champion JoAnne Carner finished at 312 (+24), thirteen strokes back.

With a winner's share of $6,000, the 1972 edition was the first to exceed that of the inaugural championship in 1946, the only one conducted as a match play event. The course conditions at Winged Foot were soft, affected by the recent heavy rains of tropical storm Agnes, originally a hurricane. Two-time champion Louise Suggs made the cut at age 48.

The championship was previously held at the East Course in 1957; the adjacent West Course has hosted many major championships.

== Final leaderboard ==
Sunday, July 2, 1972

Place	Player	Score	To par	Money ($)
1	(United States) Susie Berning	79-73-76-71=299	+11	6,000
T2	(United States) Kathy Ahern	74-80-76-70=300	+12	2,200
T2	(United States) Pam Barnett	73-76-75-76=300	+12	2,200
T2	(United States) Judy Rankin	76-75-76-73=300	+12	2,200
5	(United States) Betty Burfeindt	75-78-74-75=302	+14	1,500
T6	(United States) Jane Booth (a)	79-75-78-72=304	+16	0
T6	(United States) Gloria Ehret	74-74-80-76=304	+16	1,350
T6	(United States) Mickey Wright	77-80-76-71=304	+16	1,350
T9	(Canada) Jocelyne Bourassa	76-75-78-76=305	+17	1,150
T9	(United States) Carol Mann	79-77-78-71=305	+17	1,150
T9	(United States) Carol Semple Thompson (a)	79-79-74-73=305	+17	0
