= Mary Bea Porter =

American professional golfer (born 1949)

Personal information
- Full name: Mary Bea Porter-King
- Nationality: United States
- Born: December 4, 1949 (age 76) Everett, Washington, U.S.
- Height: 5 ft 7 in (1.70 m)

Career
- Sport: Golf
- College: Arizona State University
- Status: Professional
- Former tour: LPGA Tour (1973–1996)
- Professional wins: 1

Number of wins by tour
- LPGA Tour: 1

Best results in LPGA major championships
- Chevron Championship: CUT: 1983, 1984, 1985, 1986
- Women's PGA C'ship: 25th: 1975
- U.S. Women's Open: 68th: 1981
- du Maurier Classic: T48: 1980

Mary Bea Porter-King (born December 4, 1949) is an American professional golfer who played on the LPGA Tour.

Porter was born in Everett, Washington. She attended Arizona State University, where she played four sports; golf, basketball, volleyball, and softball. She was inducted into the Arizona State Sports Hall of Fame in 2001.

Porter turned professional in 1973 and joined the LPGA Tour after winning the qualifying school tournament in June 1973. She won once on the LPGA Tour in 1975.

During a qualifying round for the 1988 Samaritan Turquoise Classic, Porter saved the life of a drowning boy at a home adjacent to the fairway.

Porter-King moved to Hawaii in 1989 after her marriage and helped found the Hawaii State Junior Golf Association. She was inducted into the Hawaii Golf Hall of Fame in 2004.

Porter-King was awarded the 2011 PGA First Lady of Golf Award by the PGA of America.

== Professional wins ==
=== LPGA Tour wins (1) ===
No.	Date	Tournament	Winning score	Margin of victory	Runner-up
1	Oct 26, 1975	Golf Inns of America	−5 (68-72-71-76=287)	3 strokes	(United States) Donna Caponi
