= 1968 U.S. Women's Open =

Coordinates: 40.499°N 75.846°W

Tournament information
- Dates: July 4–7, 1968
- Location: Fleetwood, Pennsylvania
- Course: Moselem Springs Golf Club
- Organized by: USGA
- Tour: LPGA Tour
- Format: Stroke play – 72 holes

Statistics
- Par: 71
- Length: 6,232 yards (5,699 m)
- Field: 104: 65 pros, 39 amateurs; 44 after cut
- Cut: 156 (+14)
- Prize fund: $25,000
- Winner's share: $5,000

Champion
- (United States) Susie Maxwell Berning
- 294 (+10)

Location in the United States
Location in Pennsylvania

The 1968 U.S. Women's Open was the 23rd U.S. Women's Open, held July 4–7 at Moselem Springs Golf Club in Fleetwood, Pennsylvania, northeast of Reading.

Susie Maxwell Berning won the first of her three U.S. Women's Open titles, three shots ahead of runner-up Mickey Wright, a four-time champion. It was the second of four major titles for Berning, a newlywed of less than two months. She led wire-to-wire and bogeyed the final three holes.

Defending champion Catherine Lacoste, still an amateur, finished thirteen strokes back, tied for thirteenth place.

== Final leaderboard ==
Sunday, July 7, 1968

Place	Player	Score	To par	Money ($)
1	(United States) Susie Maxwell Berning	69-73-76-71=289	+5	5,000
2	(United States) Mickey Wright	70-78-76-68=292	+8	2,200
T3	(United States) Carol Mann	71-76-73-75=295	+11	1,125
T3	(United States) Marilynn Smith	72-76-74-73=295	+11	1,125
T5	(United States) Murle Lindstrom	73-73-75-75=296	+12	800
T5	(United States) Kathy Whitworth	75-74-73-74=296	+12	800
7	(United States) Clifford Ann Creed	77-73-76-71=297	+13	680
8	(West Germany) Gerda Whalen	75-72-79-73=299	+15	630
T9	(United States) Phyllis Preuss (a)	73-76-73-78=300	+16	0
T9	(United States) Judy Rankin	75-76-74-75=300	+16	570
T9	(United States) Sandra Spuzich	75-75-78-72=300	+16	570
