= Shirley Englehorn Invitational =

Golf tournament formerly on the LPGA Tour

Coordinates: 43.736°N 116.696°W

Tournament information
- Location: Caldwell, Idaho, U.S.
- Established: 1966
- Course: Purple Sage Golf Course
- Par: 71
- Tour: LPGA Tour
- Format: Stroke play - 54 holes
- Prize fund: $11,500
- Month played: September
- Final year: 1968

Tournament record score
- Aggregate: 203 Mickey Wright (1966)
- To par: −10 as above

Final champion
- (United States) Carol Mann

Location in the United States

The Shirley Englehorn Invitational was a women's professional golf tournament in Idaho for three seasons on the LPGA Tour. It was played from 1966 to 1968, at the Purple Sage Golf Course, north of Caldwell. Tour player Shirley Englehorn, a Caldwell native, hosted the tournament and won in 1967 in a playoff. Purple Sage was one of the final designs of A.V. Macan.

== Winners ==
Year	Dates	Champion	Country	Winning score	To par	Margin of victory	Runner-up	Purse ($)	Winner's share ($)	Notes
1968	Sep 13–15	Carol Mann	United States	70-69-69=208	−5	5 strokes	(United States) Gloria Ehret	11,500	1,725	
1967	Sep 15–17	Shirley Englehorn	United States	71-70-69=210	−3	Playoff	(United States) Kathy Whitworth	11,000	1,650	
1966	Sep 16–18	Mickey Wright	United States	65-68-70=203	−10	5 strokes	(United States) Sandra Haynie	10,000	1,500	
