= Knoxville Ladies Classic =

Golf tournament formerly on the LPGA Tour

The Knoxville Ladies Classic was a golf tournament on the LPGA Tour, played only in 1972. It was played at the Deane Hill Country Club in Knoxville, Tennessee. Kathy Whitworth won the event by four strokes over Sandra Haynie.
