= Patty Berg Classic (Massachusetts) =

Golf tournament formerly on the LPGA Tour

The Patty Berg Classic was a golf tournament on the LPGA Tour, played in 1969 at Pleasant Valley Country Club in Sutton, Massachusetts, United States. Kathy Whitworth won the event by one stroke over Sandra Haynie.

== See also ==
- Patty Berg Classic - an unrelated LPGA Tour event played in Minnesota from 1975 to 1980.
