= Southgate Ladies Open =

Golfing event in Kansas (U.S.)

The Southgate Ladies Open was a golf tournament on the LPGA Tour from 1969 to 1975. It was played at the Leawood South Country Club in Leawood, Kansas.

== Tournament locations ==
Years	Venue	Location
1969-1975	Leawood South Country Club	Leawood, Kansas

== Winners ==
Year	Winner	Score	To par	Margin of victory	Runner(s)-up	Purse ($)	Winner's share ($)	Ref.
Southgate Open
1975	(United States) Kathy Whitworth	213	E	4 strokes	(West Germany) Gerda Boykin	40,000	5,700	
Southgate Ladies Open
1974	(United States) Jane Blalock (tie) and (United States) Sue Roberts	142 (Note: Shortened to 36 holes due to rain.)	−2	Playoff	(United States) Shelley Hamlin (tie) and (United States) Mary Mills	35,000	4,375 each	
1973	(United States) Kathy Whitworth	142 (Note: Shortened to 36 holes due to rain.)	−2	1 stroke	(West Germany) Gerda Boykin	25,000	3,750	
1972	(United States) Kathy Whitworth	216	E	Playoff	(Canada) Jocelyne Bourassa	20,000	3,000	
Southgate Open
1971	(United States) Pam Barnett	210	−6	3 strokes	(United States) Jane Blalock (United States) JoAnne Carner	20,000	3,000	
Southgate Ladies Open
1970	(United States) Kathy Ahern	211	−5	3 strokes	(United States) Judy Rankin	20,000	3,000	
1969	(United States) Carol Mann	217	+1	1 stroke	(United States) Jan Ferraris	20,000	3,000	
