= Pam Higgins =

American professional golfer (born 1945)

Personal information
- Full name: Pamela Sue Higgins
- Nationality: United States
- Born: December 5, 1945 (age 80) Groveport, Ohio, U.S.
- Height: 5 ft 5 in (1.65 m)

Career
- Sport: Golf
- College: Ohio State University
- Turned professional: 1969
- Former tour: LPGA Tour (1969–1982)
- Professional wins: 3

Number of wins by tour
- LPGA Tour: 3

Best results in LPGA major championships
- Women's PGA C'ship: T14: 1975
- U.S. Women's Open: T4: 1978
- du Maurier Classic: T7: 1979

Pamela Sue Higgins (born December 5, 1945) is an American professional golfer who played on the LPGA Tour.

Higgins won three times on the LPGA Tour between 1971 and 1980.

== Professional wins ==
=== LPGA Tour wins (3) ===
No.	Date	Tournament	Winning score	Margin of Victory	Runner(s)-up
1	Sep 26, 1971	Lincoln-Mercury Open	-4 (74-70-71=215)	1 stroke	(United States) Kathy Whitworth
2	Feb 13, 1977	American Cancer Society Classic	-4 (72-71-69=212)	Playoff	(United States) Judy Rankin
3	May 11, 1980	Lady Michelob	-11 (67-71-70=208)	3 strokes	(United States) Amy Alcott (United States) Donna Caponi

LPGA Tour playoff record (1–0)

No.	Year	Tournament	Opponent(s)	Result
1	1977	American Cancer Society Classic	(United States) Judy Rankin	Won with par on first extra hole
