= 1970 LPGA Championship =

Coordinates: 42.151°N 71.737°W

Tournament information
- Dates: June 11–15, 1970
- Location: Sutton, Massachusetts
- Course: Pleasant Valley Country Club
- Tour: LPGA Tour
- Format: Stroke play – 72 holes

Statistics
- Par: 73
- Length: 6,130 yards (5,605 m)
- Field: 67 players
- Cut: none
- Prize fund: $30,000
- Winner's share: $4,500

Champion
- (United States) Shirley Englehorn
- 285 (−7), playoff

Location in the United States
Location in Massachusetts

The 1970 LPGA Championship was the 16th LPGA Championship, held June 11–15 at Pleasant Valley Country Club in Sutton, Massachusetts, southeast of Worcester.

In an 18-hole Monday playoff, Shirley Englehorn won her only major title, defeating 1967 champion Kathy Whitworth by four strokes. Englehorn bogeyed the second hole and parred the rest for a 74 (+1). Three years earlier Pleasant Valley, Whitworth had bested Englehorn by a stroke in 1967, after the pair had co-led after 54 holes. It was Englehorn's fourth consecutive victory during the 1970 season; defending champion Betsy Rawls tied for 26th, 21 strokes back.

This was the third LPGA Championship held at Pleasant Valley in four years, and the third of seven in an eight-year stretch.

== Final leaderboard ==
Sunday June 14, 1970

Whitworth had a four-stroke lead after 58 holes, but Englehorn was four-under on the back nine on Sunday, including a birdie on the final hole to force the Monday playoff.

| Place | Player | Score | To par | Money ($) |
|---|---|---|---|---|
| T1 | (United States) Shirley Englehorn | 70-70-75-70=285 | −7 | Playoff |
| T1 | (United States) Kathy Whitworth | 69-71-73-72=285 | −7 | Playoff |
| 3 | (United States) Sandra Palmer | 73-72-73-70=288 | −4 | 2,600 |
| 4 | (United States) Murle Breer | 75-71-70-74=290 | −2 | 2,150 |
| 5 | (United States) Sharon Miller | 74-74-72-71=291 | −1 | 1,800 |
| T6 | (United States) JoAnne Carner | 71-76-70-75=292 | E | 1,400 |
| T6 | (United States) Sandra Haynie | 73-72-72-75=292 | E | 1,400 |
| T8 | (West Germany) Gerda Whalen | 73-73-73-74=293 | +1 | 1,050 |
| T8 | (United States) Sharron Moran | 73-71-75-74=293 | +1 | 1,050 |
| T8 | (United States) Marilynn Smith | 74-69-73-77=293 | +1 | 1,050 |

== Playoff ==
Monday, June 15, 1970

No birdies were scored in the playoff: both bogeyed the second hole and Whitworth had another at the ninth to fall one back at the turn. She had a double bogey at the twelfth and dropped three back, while Englehorn had seventeen pars on the way to a one-over 74 for a four-stroke win and the title.

| Place | Player | Score | To par | Money ($) |
|---|---|---|---|---|
| 1 | (United States) Shirley Englehorn | 39-35=74 | +1 | 4,500 |
| 2 | (United States) Kathy Whitworth | 40-38=78 | +5 | 3,410 |
