= 1971 LPGA Championship =

Coordinates: 42.151°N 71.737°W

Tournament information
- Dates: June 10–13, 1971
- Location: Sutton, Massachusetts
- Course: Pleasant Valley Country Club
- Tour: LPGA Tour
- Format: Stroke play – 72 holes

Statistics
- Par: 73
- Length: 6,130 yards (5,605 m)
- Field: 52 after cut
- Cut: 160 (+14)
- Prize fund: $53,000
- Winner's share: $7,950

Champion
- (United States) Kathy Whitworth
- 288 (−4)

Location in the United States
Location in Massachusetts

The 1971 LPGA Championship was the 17th LPGA Championship, held June 10–13 at Pleasant Valley Country Club in Sutton, Massachusetts, southeast of Worcester.

Kathy Whitworth, the 1967 champion, won the second of her three LPGA Championship titles, four strokes ahead of runner-up Kathy Ahern, who won the following year. It was the fifth of Whitworth's six major titles.

== Final leaderboard ==
Sunday, June 13, 1971

Place	Player	Score	To par	Money ($)
1	(United States) Kathy Whitworth	71-73-70-74=288	−4	7,950
2	(United States) Kathy Ahern	70-74-73-75=292	E	5,800
T3	(United States) Jane Blalock	70-74-77-72=293	+1	3,278
T3	(Canada) Sandra Post Elliott	73-73-75-72=293	+1	3,278
T3	(United States) Sandra Haynie	75-73-71-74=293	+1	3,278
6	(United States) Susie Berning	75-74-74-71=294	+2	2,200
T7	(United States) Carol Mann	75-77-72-71=295	+3	1,750
T7	(United States) DeDe Owens	74-76-73-72=295	+3	1,750
T7	(United States) Judy Rankin	77-71-72-75=295	+3	1,750
T10	(United States) Debbie Austin	73-68-79-76=296	+4	1,450
T10	(Japan) Chako Higuchi	73-75-75-73=296	+4	1,450
