= 1968 LPGA Championship =

Coordinates: 42.151°N 71.737°W

Tournament information
- Dates: June 20–24, 1968
- Location: Sutton, Massachusetts
- Course: Pleasant Valley Country Club
- Tour: LPGA Tour
- Format: Stroke play – 72 holes

Statistics
- Par: 73
- Length: 6,130 yards (5,605 m)
- Field: 50 players
- Cut: none
- Prize fund: $20,000
- Winner's share: $3,000

Champion
- (Canada) Sandra Post
- 294 (+2), playoff

Location in the United States
Location in Massachusetts

The 1968 LPGA Championship was the fourteenth LPGA Championship, held June 20–24 at Pleasant Valley Country Club in Sutton, Massachusetts, southeast of Worcester.

In an 18-hole Monday playoff, Sandra Post won her only major title, defeating defending champion and LPGA president Kathy Whitworth by seven strokes. Post turned 20 earlier in the month and this was the first of her eight victories on the LPGA Tour. It was the only women's major won by a Canadian for 48 years, until 18-year-old Brooke Henderson won this event in 2016.

This was the second consecutive LPGA Championship held at Pleasant Valley, and the second of seven in an eight-year stretch. The PGA Tour also played at the course this year; the inaugural Kemper Open was held in mid-September, won by Arnold Palmer.

== Final leaderboard ==
Sunday, June 23, 1968

Defending champion Kathy Whitworth sank a three-foot (0.9 m) putt on the final hole to tie Sandra Post and force a Monday playoff. Both shot even-par 73 on Sunday to finish at 294 (+2).

Place	Player	Score	To par	Money ($)
T1	(Canada) Sandra Post	72-75-74-73=294	+2	Playoff
T1	(United States) Kathy Whitworth	74-74-73-73=294	+2	Playoff
3	(West Germany) Gerda Whalen	72-76-74-73=295	+3	1,800
4	(United States) Sandra Spuzich	74-75-73-74=296	+4	1,500
5	(United States) Clifford Ann Creed	77-78-71-72=298	+6	1,250
6	(United States) Sandra Haynie	73-76-75-75=299	+7	1,000
7	(United States) Betsy Rawls	80-76-73-71=300	+8	850
T8	(United States) Murle Lindstrom	75-74-81-72=302	+10	713
T8	(United States) Beth Stone	76-75-72-79=302	+10	713
10	(United States) Mickey Wright	78-80-73-72=303	+11	600

== Playoff ==
Monday, June 24, 1968

Place	Player	Score	To par	Money ($)
1	(Canada) Sandra Post	34-34=68	−5	3,000
2	(United States) Kathy Whitworth	35-40=75	+2	2,300

=== Scorecard ===
Hole	1	2	3	4	5	6	7	8	9	10	11	12	13	14	15	16	17	18
Par	5	5	3	4	4	5	5	4	3	4	4	4	4	3	4	3	4	5
(Canada) Post	−1	−2	−3	−3	−3	−3	−2	−3	−4	−4	−5	−6	−6	−6	−7	−7	−6	−5
(United States) Whitworth	E	−2	−2	−3	−3	−3	−3	−3	−3	−3	−3	−2	−2	−2	−2	−2	+2	+2

Eagle	Birdie	Bogey	Double bogey	Triple bogey+
