= 1975 LPGA Championship =

Coordinates: 39.445°N 76.581°W

Tournament information
- Dates: May 29 – June 1, 1975
- Location: Lutherville, Maryland
- Course: Pine Ridge Golf Course
- Tour: LPGA Tour
- Format: Stroke play – 72 holes

Statistics
- Par: 73
- Field: 96 players, 53 after cut
- Cut: 152 (+6)
- Prize fund: $55,000
- Winner's share: $8,000

Champion
- (United States) Kathy Whitworth
- 288 (−4)

Location in the United States
Location in Maryland

The 1975 LPGA Championship was the 21st LPGA Championship, held May 29 to June 1 at Pine Ridge Golf Course in Lutherville, Maryland, a suburb north of Baltimore.

Kathy Whitworth won her third LPGA Championship, a stroke ahead of defending champion Sandra Haynie. It was Whitworth's sixth and final major title.

== Final leaderboard ==
Sunday, June 1, 1975

Place	Player	Score	To par	Money ($)
1	(United States) Kathy Whitworth	70-70-75-73=288	−4	8,000
2	(United States) Sandra Haynie	72-72-71-74=289	−3	5,650
3	(United States) Jo Ann Washam	71-76-72-71=290	−2	4,300
4	(United States) Donna Caponi Young	72-72-73-74=291	−1	3,300
5	(United States) Carol Mann	71-77-72-72=292	E	2,550
T6	(Canada) Jocelyne Bourassa	74-74-72-73=293	+1	1,875
T6	(United States) Sandra Palmer	74-71-73-75=293	+1	1,875
T6	(United States) Sandra Spuzich	68-78-75-72=293	+1	1,875
T9	(United States) JoAnne Carner	73-77-74-70=294	+2	1,475
T9	(Japan) Chako Higuchi	75-74-74-71=294	+2	1,475
