= Pam Barnett =

American professional golfer (born 1944)

Personal information
- Full name: Pamela Barnett
- Nationality: United States
- Born: March 2, 1944 (age 82) Charlotte, North Carolina, U.S.
- Height: 5 ft 5 in (1.65 m)

Career
- Sport: Golf
- College: Winthrop College
- Turned professional: 1966
- Former tour: LPGA Tour (1966–77)
- Professional wins: 1

Number of wins by tour
- LPGA Tour: 1

Best results in LPGA major championships
- Western Open: T29: 1967
- Titleholders C'ship: T16: 1966
- Chevron Championship: T38: 1984
- Women's PGA C'ship: T7: 1972
- U.S. Women's Open: T2: 1972
- du Maurier Classic: DNP

Pamela Barnett (born March 2, 1944) is an American professional golfer who played on the LPGA Tour.

== Career ==
Barnett won once on the LPGA Tour in 1971.

== Professional wins (1) ==
=== LPGA Tour wins (1) ===
No.	Date	Tournament	Winning score	Margin of Victory	Runners-up
1	Aug 26, 1971	Southgate Open	-6 (70-72-68=210)	3 strokes	(United States) Jane Blalock (United States) JoAnne Carner
