= Naples Lely Classic =

Golf tournament formerly on the LPGA Tour

The Naples Lely Classic was a golf tournament on the LPGA Tour from 1973 to 1975. It was played at the Lely Country Club in Naples, Florida.

== Winners ==
- 1975 Sandra Haynie
- 1974 Carol Mann
- 1973 Kathy Whitworth

== See also ==
- The Sarah Coventry, another LPGA Tour event played at Lely Country Club in 1976.
