= Sears Women's Classic =

Former golf tournament

The Sears Women's Classic was a golf tournament on the LPGA Tour from 1971 to 1974. It was played at the Port St. Lucie Country Club, Sinners Course in Port St. Lucie, Florida. In 1971, the format was 54 holes of stroke play. From 1972 to 1974, the format changed to two rounds of match play to reduce the field from 64 to 16 players, followed by one round of stroke play.

== Winners ==
Sears Women's Classic

- 1974 Gail Denenberg
- 1973 Carol Mann

Sears Women's World Classic

- 1972 Betsy Cullen
- 1971 Ruth Jessen
