= 1969 LPGA Championship =

Coordinates: 41.665°N 74.65°W

Tournament information
- Dates: July 24–27, 1969
- Location: Kiamesha Lake, New York
- Course: Concord Golf Club
- Tour: LPGA Tour
- Format: Stroke play – 72 holes

Statistics
- Par: 73
- Length: 6,306 yards (5,766 m)
- Field: 63 players, 41 after cut
- Cut: 162 (+16)
- Prize fund: $36,000
- Winner's share: $5,250

Champion
- (United States) Betsy Rawls
- 293 (+1), playoff

Location in the United States
Location in New York

The 1969 LPGA Championship was the fifteenth LPGA Championship, held July 24–27 at Concord Golf Club in Kiamesha Lake, New York. Betsy Rawls won her second LPGA Championship, four strokes ahead of runners-up Carol Mann and Susie Maxwell Berning. She began the final round three strokes behind co-leaders Mann and Marlene Hagge. At age 41, it was Rawls' eighth and final major title; her previous major win was nine years earlier.

The purse was increased by 80% over the previous year, to US$36,000 (equivalent to $316,062 in 2025). The record field of 63 players required the championship's first 36-hole cut, which reduced the weekend field to 41 women.

== Final leaderboard ==
Sunday, July 27, 1969

Place	Player	Score	To par	Money ($)
1	(United States) Betsy Rawls	71-72-79-71=293	+1	5,250
T2	(United States) Carol Mann	70-74-75-78=297	+5	3,500
T2	(United States) Susie Maxwell Berning	70-72-80-75=297	+5	3,500
4	(United States) Marlene Hagge	74-72-73-79=298	+6	2,400
5	(United States) Murle Breer	73-76-75-75=299	+7	1,850
T6	(United States) Donna Caponi	76-75-73-76=300	+8	1,575
T6	(United States) Kathy Whitworth	72-74-78-76=300	+8	1,575
8	(United States) Sandra Palmer	77-75-76-73=301	+9	1,350
9	(United States) Judy Rankin	77-73-77-75=302	+10	1,200
T10	(Canada) Sandra Post	80-72-77-76=305	+13	1,008
T10	(United States) Sandra Spuzich	74-78-78-75=305	+13	1,008
T10	(United States) Louise Suggs	77-77-77-74=305	+13	1,008
