= Concord Open =

Golf tournament

The Concord Open was a golf tournament on the LPGA Tour, played only in 1968. It was played at the Concord Championship Golf Course in Kiamesha Lake, New York. Shirley Englehorn won the event by three strokes over Sandra Haynie.
