= Canyon Ladies Classic =

Golf tournament formerly on the LPGA Tour

The Canyon Ladies Classic was a golf tournament on the LPGA Tour, played only in 1968. It was played at the Canyon Country Club in Palm Springs, California. Kathy Whitworth won the event by two strokes over three other golfers.
