= Venice Ladies Open =

Golf tournament formerly on the LPGA Tour

The Venice Ladies Open was a golf tournament on the LPGA Tour from 1966 to 1967. It was played at the Lake Venice Golf Club in Venice, Florida.

== Winners ==
- 1967 Kathy Whitworth
- 1966 Mickey Wright
