= Paradise Palms =

Planned community in the Las Vegas Valley of Nevada

Coordinates: 36.13015°N 115.12310°W

Paradise Palms is a Mid-Century Modern housing community in Las Vegas, Nevada located between downtown and the city's University District. It was designated as a historic overlay district in 2021, the first such recognition in Clark County. The planned community, Las Vegas' first, was the brain child of Irwin Molasky in 1960 who hired the architectural firm of Palmer & Krisel to build a community within walking distance to his Boulevard Mall and when completed drew entertainers, mobsters and other members of the city's social scene. A house originally owned by Fred Glusman subsequently featured stays by Cher, Don Rickles, Diana Ross and other Vegas entertainers. The original homes off Cayuga Parkway debuted in 1960 and were developed by Molasky and Adelson's Paradise Homes. In 1963, other builders were added to the community, including California-based Americana Homes, Tropical Estates by Vallee Development, Stellar Greens by D.L Bradley, Miranti Homes and Fontainebleau Estates by Eastern Enterprises.

The inspiration for Paradise Palms was Palm Springs, California, which exhibited a similar post-World War II population boom. The land on which the houses were built was originally part of the Stardust Golf Course, now known as Las Vegas National.

The neighborhood and construction thereof were featured in a 2011 exhibit, A Place in Paradise...the Quintessential Las Vegas Neighborhood.

== Notable people ==
Residents of Paradise Palms throughout the decades have included celebrities Dean Martin, Johnny Carson, Sonny Liston, Debbie Reynolds, Howard Hughes' protégé Robert Maheu, Bobby Darrin, Dionne Warwick, Foster Brooks, Phyllis Diller, Buddy Hackett, Pat Cooper, Shecky Greene, Rip Taylor, and mobster Sam "Baby Shoes" Prezant. Other former residents include politicians Jack Vergiels, Melvin D. Close Jr., Imogene Ford and various casino strip entertainment executives such as Ash Resnick, Jimmy Newman and Jerry Gordon.
