= Wendell-West Open =

Golf tournament formerly on the LPGA Tour

The Wendell-West Open was a golf tournament on the LPGA Tour from 1969 to 1970. It was played at the Ocean Shores Golf Club in Ocean Shores, Washington.

== Winners ==
- 1970 JoAnne Carner
- 1969 Kathy Whitworth
