= Kings River Open =

Golf tournament formerly on the LPGA Tour

The Kings River Open was a golf tournament on the LPGA Tour, played only in 1968. It was played at the Kings River Country Club in Kingsburg, California. Kathy Whitworth won the event by 10 strokes over Sandra Haynie.
