= Jocelyne Bourassa =

Canadian professional golfer (1947–2021)

Personal information
- Nationality: Canada
- Born: May 30, 1947 Shawinigan, Quebec, Canada
- Died: August 3, 2021 (aged 74)
- Height: 5 ft 5.5 in (1.66 m)

Career
- Sport: Golf
- College: Université de Montréal
- Turned professional: 1972
- Former tour: LPGA Tour (1972–1979)
- Professional wins: 1

Number of wins by tour
- LPGA Tour: 1

Best results in LPGA major championships
- Titleholders C'ship: T17: 1972
- Women's PGA C'ship: T6: 1975
- U.S. Women's Open: T9: 1972, 1975
- du Maurier Classic: CUT: 1979

Achievements and awards
- Canadian Golf Hall of Fame: 1996
- LPGA Rookie of the Year: 1972
- Canada's Sports Hall of Fame: 2015

Jocelyne Bourassa, CM (May 30, 1947 – August 3, 2021) was a Canadian professional golfer, who had a distinguished amateur career. She was Rookie of the Year on the LPGA Tour in 1972 and ended her career with one victory on the tour.

== Early life and amateur career ==
Bourassa was born in Shawinigan, Quebec. She studied Physical Education at the Université de Montréal where she was a member of the volleyball, basketball, skiing and track and field teams.

Bourassa won the Quebec Junior golf championship in 1963, 1964, and 1965. In 1965, she also captured the Canadian Women's Amateur. She repeated as the national amateur champion in 1971.

== Professional career ==
In 1972, she turned professional. That year Bourassa won LPGA Rookie of the Year honors. The following year she won the first-ever La Canadienne golf championship, now the Canadian Women's Open. She was the only Canadian woman to win the Canadian Women's Open until Brooke Henderson in 2018.

== Awards and honours ==
- In 1972, she won the LPGA's Rookie of the Year award.
- In 1972, Bourassa won the Bobbie Rosenfeld Award as Canada's best female athlete.
- In 1972, she was also made a Member of the Order of Canada.
- In 1992, Bourassa was elected to the Quebec Sports Hall of Fame.
- In 1995, she was inducted the Quebec Golf Hall of Fame
- In 1996, Bourassa was inducted into the Canadian Golf Hall of Fame.
- In 2015, she was awarded the Order of Sport, marking her induction into Canada's Sports Hall of Fame.

== Amateur wins ==
this list may be incomplete

- 1963 Quebec Junior, Quebec Amateur
- 1964 Quebec Junior
- 1965 Quebec Junior, Canadian Women's Amateur
- 1967 Eastern Province Championship, Scottish Girls Open Stroke Play Championship
- 1968 Eastern Province Championship
- 1969 Eastern Province Championship, Quebec Amateur
- 1970 Eastern Province Championship, World Amateur Championships (individual)
- 1971 Canadian Women's Amateur, Ontario Amateur, New Zealand Women's Amateur, Quebec Amateur

== Professional wins (1) ==
=== LPGA Tour wins (1) ===
No.	Date	Tournament	Winning score	Margin of victory	Runners-up
1	Jun 17, 1973	La Canadienne	−5 (68-73-73=214)	Playoff	(United States) Sandra Haynie (United States) Judy Rankin

Note: Bourassa won the La Canadienne (which became the du Maurier Classic) before it became a major championship.

LPGA Tour playoff record (1–1)

No.	Year	Tournament	Opponent(s)	Result
1	1972	Southgate Ladies Open	(United States) Kathy Whitworth	Lost to par on fifth extra hole
2	1973	La Canadienne	(United States) Sandra Haynie (United States) Judy Rankin	Won with birdie on third extra hole Rankin eliminated by par on first hole
