= 1967 Women's Western Open =

Golf tournament

Coordinates: 40°34′20.78″N 89°35′16.89″W

Tournament information
- Dates: August 17–20, 1967
- Location: Pekin, Illinois
- Course: Pekin Country Club
- Tour: LPGA Tour
- Format: 72 holes, stroke play

Statistics
- Par: 75
- Length: 6,605 yards (6,040 m)
- Field: 112 players, 42 after cut
- Cut: 166 (+19)
- Prize fund: $10,000
- Winner's share: $1,500

Champion
- Kathy Whitworth
- 289 (−11)
- Location within the United States Location within Illinois

The 1967 Women's Western Open was held from August 17 to 20 at Pekin Country Club in Pekin, Illinois. It was the 38th and final edition of the Women's Western Open.

The event was won by Kathy Whitworth.

== Final leaderboard ==
Place	Player	Score	To par	Money ($)
1	(United States) Kathy Whitworth	71-74-73-71=289	−11	1,500
2	(United States) Sandra Haynie	76-72-70-74=292	−8	1,200
3	(United States) Shirley Englehorn	73-76-74-75=298	−2	1,000
4	(United States) Carol Mann	78-76-72-74=300	E	800
5	(United States) Mary Mills	76-75-76-75=302	+2	675
6	(United States) Clifford Ann Creed	78-76-76-74=304	+4	560
7	(United States) Marilynn Smith	79-79-74-74=306	+6	480
T8	(United States) Lesley Holbert	78-74-78-78=308	+8	373
T8	(United States) Sharon Miller	78-78-76-76=308	+8	373
T8	(United States) Betsy Rawls	79-80-75-74=308	+8	373
