= Amarillo Ladies' Open =

Golf tournament formerly on the LPGA Tour

The Amarillo Ladies' Open was a golf tournament on the LPGA Tour from 1966 to 1967. It was played at the Amarillo Country Club in Amarillo, Texas.

== Winners ==
- 1967 Sandra Haynie
- 1966 Kathy Whitworth
