= Ladies' Los Angeles Open =

Golf tournament formerly on the LPGA Tour

The Ladies' Los Angeles Open was a golf tournament on the LPGA Tour, played only in 1967. It was played at the Montebello Municipal Golf Course in Montebello, California. Kathy Whitworth won the event by four strokes over Murle Lindstrom.
