= Port Charlotte Invitational =

Golf tournament formerly on the LPGA Tour

The Port Charlotte Invitational was a golf tournament on the LPGA Tour, played only in 1969. It was played at the Port Charlotte Golf & Country Club in Port Charlotte, Florida. Kathy Whitworth won the event by one stroke over Sandra Haynie and Sandra Post.
