= Danbury Lady Carling Open =

Golf tournament formerly on the LPGA Tour

The Danbury Lady Carling Open was a golf tournament on the LPGA Tour from 1968 to 1969. It was played at the Ridgewood Country Club in Danbury, Connecticut.

== Winners ==
Danbury Lady Carling Open

- 1969 Carol Mann

Gino Paoli Open

- 1968 Kathy Whitworth

== See also ==
- Lady Carling Eastern Open - another LPGA Tour event, played in Massachusetts from 1962 to 1966
- Lady Carling Open - another LPGA Tour event, played in Maryland from 1964 to 1973
