= Louise Suggs Invitational =

Golf tournament formerly on the LPGA Tour

The Louise Suggs Invitational was a golf tournament on the LPGA Tour from 1966 to 1968. It was played at three locations in Palm Beach County, Florida. In 1966, it was named the Louise Suggs Delray Beach Invitational. Louise Suggs, LPGA Tour founder and Delray Beach, Florida resident, was the tournament host.

== Winners ==
Year	Venue	Location	Winner
1968	Pine Tree Golf Club	Delray Beach, Florida	Kathy Whitworth
1967	Cypress Creek Country Club	Boynton Beach, Florida	Susie Maxwell
1966	Delray Beach Country Club	Delray Beach, Florida	Marilynn Smith
