= River Plantation Invitational =

Golf tournament formerly on the LPGA Tour

The River Plantation Invitational was a golf tournament on the LPGA Tour from 1968 to 1969. It was played at the River Plantation Country Club in Conroe, Texas. Kathy Whitworth won both editions of the event.

== Winners ==
River Plantation Women's Open

- 1969 Kathy Whitworth

River Plantation Invitational

- 1968 Kathy Whitworth
