= Port Malabar Invitational =

Golf tournament formerly on the LPGA Tour

The Port Malabar Invitational was a golf tournament on the LPGA Tour from 1968 to 1969. It was played at the Port Malabar Country Club in Palm Bay, Florida.

== Winners ==
- 1969 Kathy Whitworth
- 1968 Mickey Wright
