= Shirley Englehorn =

American professional golfer (1940–2022)

Personal information
- Full name: Shirley Ruth Englehorn
- Nickname: Dimples
- Nationality: United States
- Born: December 12, 1940 Caldwell, Idaho, U.S.
- Died: October 2, 2022 (aged 81) Colorado Springs, Colorado, U.S.
- Height: 5 ft 7 in (1.70 m)

Career
- Sport: Golf
- Turned professional: 1959
- Former tour: LPGA Tour
- Professional wins: 12

Number of wins by tour
- LPGA Tour: 11
- Other: 1

Best results in LPGA major championships (wins: 1)
- Western Open: 3rd: 1967
- Titleholders C'ship: T6: 1964
- Women's PGA C'ship: Won: 1970
- U.S. Women's Open: T3: 1964
- du Maurier Classic: T52: 1979

Shirley Ruth Englehorn (December 12, 1940 – October 2, 2022) was an American professional golfer. Nicknamed "Dimples", she won 11 tournaments during her LPGA Tour career, including one major, the 1970 LPGA Championship.

== Early life and amateur career ==
Englehorn was born on December 12, 1940, in Caldwell, Idaho, where she was raised. She first played golf when she was six years old, having been introduced to the sport by Shirley Spork, one of the thirteen founders of the LPGA. She also studied with Johnny Revolta, an 18-time PGA Tour winner and the PGA Championship victor in 1935.

Englehorn won numerous amateur and open events. These included the McCall Open (1957 and 1958), the Idaho Open (1957 to 1959), and the Pacific Northwest Amateur (1958). She also won the Oregon Open in 1959, and won the Dorothy Pease Trophy (Trans-Miss) when she was fifteen, the youngest player to win the honor.

In 1958, she graduated from Caldwell High School.

== Professional career ==
In 1959, Englehorn turned pro at age 18 and joined the LPGA Tour. She was sponsored by the Athletic Round Table of Spokane from 1960 through 1962. Despite a career-threatening equestrian accident in Georgia in March 1960, Englehorn recovered and won her first tournament at age 21 in July 1962 at the Women's Eastern Open in Sutton, Massachusetts. She won a total of 11 events on the LPGA Tour, including one major championship, the LPGA Championship in 1970 in a playoff over Kathy Whitworth, her third victory at Sutton.

Englehorn led the tour that season in wins with four. Five years earlier, in 1965, she suffered injuries in an automobile accident and missed much of the season. Englehorn was awarded the Ben Hogan Award in early 1968 by the Golf Writers Association of America in honor of her successful comeback from injuries. She had surgery on her ankle in 1971 and 1973 and in each case returned to compete. She later became a golf instructor, and was conferred the LPGA Teacher of the Year Award in 1978. She made her last LPGA appearance in 1979.

== Personal life ==
Englehorn died at Penrose Hospital in Colorado Springs, Colorado, on October 2, 2022, at the age of 81.

== Awards and honors ==
- In 1968, Englehorn was bestowed the Ben Hogan Award by the Golf Writers Association of America.
- In 1978, she earned the PGA Teacher of the Year Award.

== Professional wins (12) ==
=== LPGA Tour wins (11) ===
Legend
LPGA Tour major championships (1)
Other LPGA Tour (10)

No.	Date	Tournament	Winning score	To par	Margin of victory	Runner(s)-up	Ref
1	Jul 22, 1962	Eastern Open	74-77-75=226	+4	3 strokes	(United States) Mary Mills	
2	Sep 9, 1962	Eugene Open	75-69-79-69=292	−4	7 strokes	(United States) Jackie Pung	
3	Jul 7, 1963	Lady Carling Eastern Open	71-79-71=221	+4	2 strokes	(United States) JoAnne Carner (a)	
4	Aug 9, 1964	Waterloo Women's Open Invitational	72-71-68=211	−5	4 strokes	(United States) Ruth Jessen	
5	May 22, 1966	Babe Zaharias Open	71-68-70=209	−1	2 strokes	(United States) Kathy Whitworth	
6	Sep 17, 1967	Shirley Englehorn Invitational	71-70-69=210	−3	Playoff	(United States) Kathy Whitworth	
7	Aug 10, 1968	Concord Open	77-76-76=229	−2	3 strokes	(United States) Sandra Haynie	
8	May 17, 1970	Johnny Londoff Chevrolet Tournament	74-74-68=216	E	2 strokes	(United States) Carol Mann	
9	May 31, 1970	O'Sullivan Ladies Open	71-68-71=210	−6	Playoff	(Australia) Margie Masters	
10	Jun 7, 1970	Lady Carling Open	72-67-71=210	−9	1 stroke	(United States) Carol Mann	
11	Jun 13, 1970	LPGA Championship	70-70-75-70=285	−7	Playoff	(United States) Kathy Whitworth	

LPGA Tour playoff record (3–2)

No.	Year	Tournament	Opponent(s)	Result	Ref
1	1963	Rock City Ladies Open	(United States) Barbara Romack	Lost to par on third extra hole	
2	1966	Alamo Ladies' Open	(United States) Sandra Haynie	Lost to birdie on third extra hole	
3	1967	Shirley Englehorn Invitational	(United States) Kathy Whitworth	Won with par on second extra hole	
4	1970	O'Sullivan Ladies Open	(Australia) Margie Masters	Won with birdie on first extra hole	
5	1970	LPGA Championship	(United States) Kathy Whitworth	Won 18-hole playoff (Englehorn: 74, Whitworth: 78)	

=== Other wins (1) ===
- 1964 Haig & Haig Scotch Foursome (with Sam Snead)

== Major championships ==
=== Wins (1) ===
Year	Championship	Winning score	Margin	Runner-up	Ref
1970	LPGA Championship	−7 (70-70-75-70=285)	Playoff^{1}	(United States) Kathy Whitworth	

^{1} Won in an 18-hole playoff. Englehorn: 74, Whitworth: 78

== See also ==
- List of golfers with most LPGA Tour wins
