= O'Sullivan Ladies Open =

Former LPGA golf tournament

The O'Sullivan Ladies Open was a golf tournament on the LPGA Tour from 1968 to 1971. It was played at the Winchester Country Club in Winchester, Virginia.

== Winners ==
O'Sullivan Ladies Open

- 1971 Judy Kimball
- 1970 Shirley Englehorn
- 1969 Murle Lindstrom

O'Sullivan Open

- 1968 Marilynn Smith
