= Lincoln-Mercury Open =

Women's golf tournament on the LPGA Tour

The Lincoln-Mercury Open was a golf tournament on the LPGA Tour from 1969 to 1973. It was played at the Round Hill Country Club in Alamo, California.

== Winners ==
- 1969 Donna Caponi
- 1970 Judy Rankin
- 1971 Pam Higgins
- 1972 Sandra Haynie
- 1973 Sandra Haynie
