= St. Louis Women's Invitational =

Golf tournament

The St. Louis Women's Invitational was a golf tournament on the LPGA Tour from 1954 to 1956 and again from 1964 to 1970. It was played at Glen Echo Country Club in St. Louis, Missouri in 1954, 1964, and 1970 and at the Norwood Hills Country Club in St. Louis, Missouri from 1955 to 1956 and 1965 to 1969.

== Winners ==
Johnny Londoff Chevrolet Tournament

- 1970 Shirley Englehorn

St. Louis Women's Invitational

- 1969 Sandra Haynie

Holiday Inn Classic

- 1968 Kathy Whitworth

St. Louis Women's Invitational

- 1967 Kathy Whitworth

Clayton Federal Invitational

- 1966 Kathy Whitworth

St. Louis Open

- 1965 Mary Mills

Squirt Ladies' Open Invitational

- 1964 Mickey Wright

St. Louis Open

- 1957-63 No tournament
- 1956 Fay Crocker
- 1955 Louise Suggs
- 1954 Betsy Rawls
