= Alamo Ladies Classic =

Golf tournament formerly on the LPGA Tour

The Alamo Ladies Classic was a golf tournament on the LPGA Tour from 1960 to 1973. It was played at several different courses in San Antonio, Texas.

== Tournament locations ==
Years	Venue
1960-62	Brackenridge Park Golf Course
1963-66	Pecan Valley Golf Club
1967-72	Olmos Basin Golf Course
1973	Woodlake Golf Club

== Winners ==
Alamo Ladies Classic

- 1973 Betsy Cullen

Alamo Ladies Open

- 1972 Kathy Whitworth

San Antonio Alamo Open

- 1971 Sandra Haynie

Alamo Ladies' Open

- 1968-70 No tournament
- 1967 Kathy Whitworth
- 1966 Sandra Haynie

Alamo Open

- 1965 Marlene Hagge

San Antonio Civitan Open

- 1964 Kathy Whitworth
- 1963 Kathy Whitworth

San Antonio Civitan

- 1962 Murle Lindstrom
- 1961 Louise Suggs
- 1960 Louise Suggs
