= Buckeye Savings Invitational =

Golf tournament in the United States

The Buckeye Savings Invitational was a golf tournament on the LPGA Tour from 1965 to 1970. It was played in Cincinnati, Ohio at the Clovernook Country Club from 1965 to 1968 and at the Royal Oak Racquet & Country Club from 1969 to 1970.

== Winners ==
Cincinnati Open

- 1970 Betsy Rawls

Buckeye Savings Invitational

- 1969 Sandra Spuzich
- 1968 Carol Mann
- 1967 Carol Mann
- 1966 Sandra Haynie
- 1965 Kathy Whitworth
