= Supertest Ladies Open =

1960s ladies' professional golf tournament

The Supertest Ladies Open was a golf tournament on the LPGA Tour from 1966 to 1969. It was played in Ontario, Canada at the Sunningdale Golf Club in London from 1966 to 1967 and at the Bayview Golf & Country Club in Thornhill from 1968 to 1969. It was the first LPGA Tour event to be played in Canada. The title sponsor was Supertest Petroleum, a Canadian petroleum company.

== Winners ==
Ladies' Supertest Open

- 1969 Sandra Haynie

Supertest Canadian Open

- 1968 Carol Mann

Supertest Ladies' Open

- 1967 Carol Mann

Supertest Ladies Open

- 1966 Kathy Whitworth
