= 1967 LPGA Championship =

Coordinates: 42.151°N 71.737°W

Tournament information
- Dates: July 13–16, 1967
- Location: Sutton, Massachusetts
- Course: Pleasant Valley Country Club
- Tour: LPGA Tour
- Format: Stroke play – 72 holes

Statistics
- Par: 73
- Length: 6,250 yards (5,715 m)
- Field: 51 players
- Cut: none
- Prize fund: $17,500
- Winner's share: $2,625

Champion
- (United States) Kathy Whitworth
- 284 (−8)

Location in the United States
Location in Massachusetts

The 1967 LPGA Championship was the thirteenth LPGA Championship, held July 13–16 at Pleasant Valley Country Club in Sutton, Massachusetts, southeast of Worcester.

Kathy Whitworth sank a fifty-foot (15 m) birdie putt on the final hole to win the first of her three LPGA Championships, one stroke ahead of runner-up Shirley Englehorn; the two were in the final pairing as 54-hole co-leaders at 215 (−4). With three holes to play, Whitworth led by two strokes, but an Englehorn birdie on 16 and a Whitworth bogey on 17 left them tied on the final tee. Defending champion Gloria Ehret finished thirteen strokes back, tied for tenth. It was the third of Whitworth's six major titles.

This was the first of seven LPGA Championships held at Pleasant Valley in an eight-year stretch.

== Final leaderboard ==
Sunday, July 16, 1967

Place	Player	Score	To par	Money ($)
1	(United States) Kathy Whitworth	69-74-72-69=284	−8	2,625
2	(United States) Shirley Englehorn	75-68-72-70=285	−7	2,000
3	(United States) Clifford Ann Creed	73-70-73-74=290	−2	1,600
4	(United States) Carol Mann	77-74-67-73=291	−1	1,300
5	(United States) Mickey Wright	71-73-75-73=292	E	1,100
6	(United States) Sandra Haynie	74-72-74-73=293	+1	925
7	(United States) Betsy Cullen	74-71-73-76=294	+2	775
8	(United States) Susie Maxwell	72-76-75-72=295	+3	675
9	(United States) Judy Kimball	74-75-71-76=296	+4	600
T10	(United States) Gloria Ehret	70-78-74-75=297	+5	505
T10	(United States) Sandra Palmer	75-73-73-76=297	+5	505
