= Greater Baltimore Golf Classic =

Defunct LPGA Tour golf tournament in Maryland, US

The Greater Baltimore Golf Classic was a golf tournament on the LPGA Tour from 1962 to 1980. It was played at the Turf Valley Country Club in Ellicott City, Maryland from 1962 to 1966 and at the Pine Ridge Golf Course in Timonium, Maryland from 1967 to 1980.

== Winners ==
Greater Baltimore Golf Classic

- 1980 Pat Bradley

Greater Baltimore Classic

- 1979 Pat Meyers
- 1978 Nancy Lopez

Greater Baltimore Golf Classic

- 1977 Jane Blalock

Baltimore Classic

- 1975–76 No tournament
- 1974 Judy Rankin

Lady Carling Open

- 1973 Judy Rankin
- 1972 Carol Mann
- 1971 Kathy Whitworth
- 1970 Shirley Englehorn
- 1969 Susie Berning
- 1968 Kathy Whitworth
- 1967 Mickey Wright
- 1966 Kathy Whitworth
- 1965 Carol Mann
- 1964 Clifford Ann Creed

Sight Open

- 1963 Marlene Hagge

Kelly Girls Open

- 1962 Kathy Whitworth

== See also ==
- Lady Carling Eastern Open - another LPGA Tour event, played in Massachusetts from 1962 to 1966
- Danbury Lady Carling Open - another LPGA Tour event, played in Connecticut in 1969
