= Waco Tribune Herald Ladies Classic =

Golf tournament

The Waco Tribune Herald Ladies Classic was a golf tournament on the LPGA Tour from 1966 to 1973. It was played at the Lake Waco Country Club in Waco, Texas.

== Winners ==
Waco Tribune Herald Ladies Classic

- 1973 Kathy Whitworth

Quality First Classic

- 1972 Sandra Haynie
- 1971 Judy Rankin

Quality Chek'd Classic

- 1970 Kathy Whitworth
- 1969 Mary Mills
- 1968 Carol Mann
- 1967 Margie Masters

The Success Open

- 1966 Clifford Ann Creed
