= Kathy Whitworth =

American professional golfer (1939–2022)

Personal information
- Full name: Kathrynne Ann Whitworth
- Nationality: United States
- Born: September 27, 1939 Monahans, Texas, U.S.
- Died: December 24, 2022 (aged 83) Flower Mound, Texas, U.S.
- Height: 5 ft 9 in (175 cm)

Career
- Sport: Golf
- College: Odessa College
- Turned professional: 1958
- Former tours: Legends Tour; LPGA Tour (joined 1958)
- Professional wins: 98

Number of wins by tour
- LPGA Tour: 88 (1st all time)
- Ladies European Tour: 1
- Other: 9

Best results in LPGA major championships (wins: 6)
- Western Open: Won: 1967
- Titleholders C'ship: Won: 1965, 1966
- Chevron Championship: T2: 1983
- Women's PGA C'ship: Won: 1967, 1971, 1975
- U.S. Women's Open: 2nd: 1971
- du Maurier Classic: T14: 1980

Achievements and awards
- World Golf Hall of Fame: 1975 (member page)
- LPGA Tour Money Winner: 1965, 1966, 1967, 1968, 1970, 1971, 1972, 1973
- LPGA Tour Player of the Year: 1966, 1967, 1968, 1969, 1971, 1972, 1973
- LPGA Vare Trophy: 1965, 1966, 1967, 1969, 1970, 1971, 1972
- Associated Press Female Athlete of the Year: 1965, 1966
- LPGA William and Mousie Powell Award: 1986
- Patty Berg Award: 1987

Kathrynne Ann Whitworth (September 27, 1939 – December 24, 2022) was an American professional golfer. During her playing career she won 88 LPGA Tour tournaments, more than anyone else on the LPGA or PGA Tours. Whitworth was also a runner-up 93 times, giving her 181 top-two finishes. In 1981, she became the first woman to reach career earnings of $1 million on the LPGA Tour. She is a member of the World Golf Hall of Fame.

== Early life and amateur career ==
Whitworth was born on September 27, 1939, in Monahans, Texas, the youngest of three daughters of Morris Whitworth, a hardware store owner and later mayor in Jal, New Mexico, where she grew up. She attended Odessa College.

Initially a tennis player, Whitworth began playing golf at 14. After working with Hardy Loudermilk, she won the 1957 and 1958 New Mexico State Amateur Championships. At 19, she changed coaches to Harvey Penick and turned pro, joining the LPGA in December 1958.

== Professional career ==
In 1962, Whitworth won her first tournament, the Kelly Girls Open. Between that and her victory in the United Virginia Bank Classic in 1985, she won 88 tournaments on the LPGA Tour, the highest number of any player in the history of professional golf, including on the men's PGA Tour. Six were major championships. In 1974, she won the Orange Blossom Classic for the fifth time, one of only four LPGA golfers to have won the same tournament five times. She was the U.S. team captain at the inaugural Solheim Cup match in 1990. She was the first LPGA player to earn $1 million, in 1981.

Whitworth was LPGA Player of the Year seven times between 1966 and 1973, won the Vare Trophy for best scoring average by an LPGA Tour player a record seven times between 1965 and 1972, and was inducted into the LPGA Hall of Fame in 1975 and into the World Golf Hall of Fame in 1982. She was named Associated Press Female Athlete of the Year in 1965 and 1967. She was Named "Golfer of the Decade" by Golf Magazine for the years 1968 to 1977 during the 1988 Centennial of Golf in America celebration. She received the 1986 William Richardson Award from the Golf Writers Association of America for consistent outstanding contributions to golf. She is also a member of the New Mexico Hall of Fame, Texas Sports Hall of Fame, Texas Golf Hall of Fame, and the Women's Sports Foundation Hall of Fame.

== Later life and death ==
Whitworth retired from competitive golf in 2005 after competing in the BJ's Charity Classic on the Women's Senior Golf Tour. In 2007, with Jay Golden, she published Kathy Whitworth's Little Book of Golf Wisdom. At the time of her death she lived in Flower Mound, Texas with her partner, Bettye Odle. She died in Flower Mound on December 24, 2022, at age 83, after collapsing while attending a neighbor's Christmas party.

== Professional wins ==
=== LPGA Tour wins (88) ===
Legend
LPGA Tour major championships (6)
Other LPGA Tour (82)

No.	Date	Tournament	Winning score	Margin of victory	Runner(s)-up
1	Jul 8, 1962	Kelly Girls Open	−7 (73-73-69=215)	1 stroke	(United States) Sandra Haynie
2	Oct 14, 1962	Phoenix Thunderbird Open	−3 (72-71-70=213)	4 strokes	(United States) Mickey Wright
3	Jun 30, 1963	Carvel Ladies Open	−2 (72-74-71=217)	1 stroke	(United States) Marilynn Smith
4	Jul 28, 1963	Wolverine Open	−9 (72-64-62=198)	5 strokes	(United States) Betsy Rawls
5	Aug 4, 1963	Milwaukee Jaycee Open	−2 (70-73-73-70=286)	7 strokes	(United States) Jackie Pung (United States) Louise Suggs
6	Aug 25, 1963	Ogden Ladies' Open	−5 (69-75-71=215)	5 strokes	(United States) Mickey Wright
7	Sep 8, 1963	Spokane Women's Open	−3 (67-70-73=210)	2 strokes	(United States) Marilynn Smith
8	Oct 20, 1963	Hillside Open	Even (70-72-77=219)	4 strokes	(United States) Mickey Wright
9	Nov 10, 1963	San Antonio Civitan Open	+7 (73-73-78-75=299)	Playoff	(United States) Mickey Wright
10	Nov 17, 1963	Mary Mills Mississippi Gulf Coast Invitational	Even (72-77-70=219)	4 strokes	(United States) Mickey Wright
11	Jul 5, 1964	San Antonio Civitan Open	−5 (70-72-71-70=283)	3 strokes	(United States) Marlene Hagge
12	Mar 21, 1965	St. Petersburg Open	−7 (70-66-71-74=281)	4 strokes	(United States) Sandra Haynie
13	May 2, 1965	Shreveport Kiwanis Invitational	−6 (70-70-70=210)	6 strokes	(United States) Patty Berg
14	Jun 6, 1965	Blue Grass Invitational	−3 (70-69-74=213)	4 strokes	(United States) Clifford Ann Creed
15	Aug 1, 1965	Lady Carling Midwest Open	Even (72-77-70=219)	1 stroke	(United States) Sandra Haynie
16	Jul 18, 1965	Yankee Open	−3 (73-68-72=213)	2 strokes	(United States) Carol Mann
17	Jul 25, 1965	Buckeye Savings Invitational	−6 (70-67-70=207)	1 stroke	(United States) Susie Maxwell Berning
18	Oct 3, 1965	Mickey Wright Invitational	−9 (68-73-71-71=283)	6 strokes	(United States) Donna Caponi
19	Nov 28, 1965	Titleholders Championship	−1 (71-71-74-71=287)	10 strokes	(United States) Peggy Wilson
20	May 8, 1966	Tall City Open	−5 (67-70-71=208)	1 stroke	(United States) Mickey Wright
21	Jun 5, 1966	Clayton Federal Invitational	+1 (68-72-68=208)	4 strokes	(United States) Shirley Englehorn
22	Jun 19, 1966	Milwaukee Jaycee Open	−7 (68-71-69-65=273)	12 strokes	(United States) Sandra Haynie
23	Jul 30, 1966	Supertest Ladies Open	−3 (71-70-72=213)	3 strokes	(United States) Mickey Wright
24	Aug 7, 1966	Lady Carling Open (Massachusetts)	−5 (74-73-70=217)	1 stroke	(United States) Carol Mann
25	Aug 13, 1966	Lady Carling Open (Maryland)	−2 (70-71-73=214)	3 strokes	(United States) Peggy Wilson
26	Oct 30, 1966	Las Cruces Ladies Open	−2 (69-71-74=214)	6 strokes	(United States) Marilynn Smith
27	Nov 6, 1966	Amarillo Ladies' Open	+2 (76-71-68=215)	Playoff	(United States) Mickey Wright
28	Nov 27, 1966	Titleholders Championship	+3 (74-70-74-73=291)	2 strokes	(United States) Judy Kimball Simon (United States) Mary Mills
29	Mar 26, 1967	Venice Ladies Open	+4 (70-71-76=217)	1 stroke	(United States) Clifford Ann Creed (United States) Gloria Ehret
30	Apr 23, 1967	Raleigh Ladies Invitational	−1 (72-72-71=215)	5 strokes	(United States) Susie Maxwell Berning
31	Jun 7, 1967	St. Louis Women's Invitational	+2 (68-70-71=209)	2 strokes	(United States) Carol Mann
32	Jul 16, 1967	LPGA Championship	−8 (69-74-72-69=284)	1 stroke	(United States) Shirley Englehorn
33	Aug 6, 1967	Lady Carling Open (Ohio)	−4 (71-70-71=212)	1 stroke	(United States) Susie Maxwell Berning
34	Aug 20, 1967	Women's Western Open	−11 (71-74-73-71=289)	3 strokes	(United States) Sandra Haynie
35	Oct 1, 1967	Ladies' Los Angeles Open	−4 (71-68-73=212)	4 strokes	(United States) Murle Breer
36	Oct 29, 1967	Alamo Ladies' Open	−3 (71-71-71=213)	3 strokes	(United States) Sandra Haynie
37	Mar 17, 1968	St. Petersburg Orange Blossom Open	Even (70-71-72=213)	1 stroke	(United States) Sandra Haynie (United States) Judy Kimball Simon
38	May 26, 1968	Dallas Civitan Open	−4 (70-70-69=209)	1 stroke	(United States) Carol Mann
39	Jun 30, 1968	Lady Carling Open (Maryland)	−2 (71-70-73=214)	1 stroke	(United States) Carol Mann
40	Aug 4, 1968	Gino Paoli Open	−1 (69-72-74=215)	Playoff	(United States) Marlene Hagge
41	Aug 18, 1968	Holiday Inn Classic	−1 (74-70-62=206)	3 strokes	(United States) Judy Kimball Simon (United States) Carol Mann
42	Sep 22, 1968	Kings River Open	−8 (68-71-69=208)	10 strokes	(United States) Sandra Haynie
43	Oct 22, 1968	River Plantation Invitational	−8 (67-70-68=205)	8 strokes	(United States) Kathy Cornelius
44	Nov 3, 1968	Canyon Ladies Classic	+2 (78-69-71=218)	2 strokes	(United States) Donna Caponi (United States) Shirley Englehorn (United States) Mary Mills
45	Nov 17, 1968	Pensacola Ladies Invitational	−3 (71-71-74=216)	3 strokes	(United States) Jo Ann Prentice
46	Nov 24, 1968	Louise Suggs Invitational	−8 (69-69-72=210)	7 strokes	(United States) Carol Mann
47	Mar 17, 1969	Orange Blossom Classic	+3 (74-70-72=216)	Playoff	(United States) Shirley Englehorn (United States) Marlene Hagge
48	Mar 23, 1969	Port Charlotte Invitational	−1 (72-72-74=218)	1 stroke	(United States) Sandra Haynie (Canada) Sandra Post
49	Mar 30, 1969	Port Malabar Invitational	−3 (68-72-70=210)	4 strokes	(United States) Mickey Wright
50	Apr 20, 1969	Lady Carling Open (Georgia)	−4 (70-72-70=212)	Playoff	(United States) Mickey Wright
51	Jun 15, 1969	Patty Berg Classic	−5 (69-73-72=214)	1 stroke	(United States) Sandra Haynie
52	Sep 14, 1969	Wendell-West Open	−3 (69-72-72=213)	1 stroke	(United States) Judy Rankin
53	Nov 2, 1969	River Plantation Women's Open	Even (70-71-72=213)	1 stroke	(United States) Betsy Rawls
54	Mar 22, 1970	Orange Blossom Classic	+3 (73-72-71=216)	1 stroke	(United States) Carol Mann
55	Oct 18, 1970	Quality Chek'd Classic	−11 (71-67-67=205)	3 strokes	(United States) JoAnne Carner
56	Apr 18, 1971	Raleigh Golf Classic	−4 (71-72-69=212)	5 strokes	(United States) Pam Barnett
57	May 23, 1971	Suzuki Golf Internationale	+1 (72-72-73=217)	2 strokes	(United States) Sandra Haynie (United States) Sandra Palmer
58	Jun 6, 1971	Lady Carling Open	−9 (71-68-71=210)	6 strokes	(United States) Jane Blalock
59	Jun 13, 1971	Eve-LPGA Championship	−4 (71-73-70-74=288)	4 strokes	(United States) Kathy Ahern
60	Apr 30, 1972	Alamo Ladies Open	−10 (66-71-72=209)	3 strokes	(United States) Mickey Wright
61	Jul 23, 1972	Raleigh Golf Classic	−4 (72-69-71=212)	2 strokes	(United States) Marilynn Smith
62	Aug 6, 1972	Knoxville Ladies Classic	−4 (71-68-71=210)	4 strokes	(United States) Sandra Haynie
63	Aug 20, 1972	Southgate Ladies Open	Even (69-71-76=216)	Playoff	(Canada) Jocelyne Bourassa
64	Oct 1, 1972	Portland Ladies Open	−7 (75-69-68=212)	4 strokes	(United States) Sandra Haynie
65	Feb 11, 1973	Naples Lely Classic	+3 (68-76-75=219)	2 strokes	(United States) JoAnne Carner
66	Mar 11, 1973	S&H Green Stamp Classic	−2 (73-71-70=214)	2 strokes	(United States) Mary Mills
67	Sep 9, 1973	Dallas Civitan Open	−3 (75-72-66=213)	Playoff	(United States) Mary Mills
68	Sep 16, 1973	Southgate Ladies Open	−2 (72-70=142)	1 stroke	(West Germany) Gerda Boykin
69	Sep 23, 1973	Portland Ladies Open	−2 (71-73=144)	2 strokes	(United States) Sandra Palmer
70	Oct 21, 1973	Waco Tribune Herald Ladies Classic	−7 (68-72-69=209)	4 strokes	(United States) Kathy Cornelius (United States) Pam Higgins (United States) Marilynn Smith
71	Nov 4, 1973	Lady Errol Classic	−3 (68-75-70=213)	2 strokes	(United States) Gloria Ehret (United States) Shelley Hamlin
72	Mar 3, 1974	Orange Blossom Classic	−7 (70-68-71=209)	1 stroke	(United States) Sandra Haynie
73	Jun 1, 1975	LPGA Championship	−4 (70-70-75-73=288)	1 stroke	(United States) Sandra Haynie
74	Sep 14, 1975	Southgate Open	Even (72-72-69=213)	4 strokes	(West Germany) Gerda Boykin
75	Feb 7, 1976	Bent Tree Classic	−7 (69-69-71=209)	1 stroke	(United States) Hollis Stacy
76	Aug 22, 1976	Patty Berg Classic	−7 (66-73-73=212)	2 strokes	(Canada) Sandra Post
77	Apr 3, 1977	Colgate-Dinah Shore Winner's Circle	+1 (76-70-72-71=289)	1 stroke	(United States) JoAnne Carner (South Africa) Sally Little
78	Apr 24, 1977	American Defender Classic	−10 (69-68-69=206)	1 stroke	(United States) Pat Bradley
79	May 22, 1977	LPGA Coca-Cola Classic	−11 (67-68-67=202)	3 strokes	(United States) Donna Caponi
80	Sep 10, 1978	National Jewish Hospital Open	−5 (70-75-66-65=276)	3 strokes	(United States) Pat Bradley (United States) Gloria Ehret (United States) Jo Ann Washam
81	May 17, 1981	Coca-Cola Classic	−8 (69-72-70=211)	Playoff	(United States) Alice Ritzman
82	Apr 18, 1982	CPC Women's International	−7 (73-68-73-67=281)	9 strokes	(United States) Patty Sheehan
83	May 16, 1982	Lady Michelob	−9 (69-68-70=207)	4 strokes	(United States) Sharon Barrett (United States) Barbara Moxness
84	Mar 20, 1983	Women's Kemper Open	−4 (72-77-70-69=288)	1 stroke	(United States) Dale Eggeling
85	Jul 22, 1984	Rochester International	−7 (73-68-71-69=281)	Playoff	(United States) Rosie Jones
86	Sep 16, 1984	Safeco Classic	−9 (69-75-65-70=279)	2 strokes	(United States) Laura Baugh (Spain) Marta Figueras-Dotti
87	Oct 14, 1984	Smirnoff Ladies Irish Open	−3 (70-74-69-72=285)	2 strokes	(United States) Pat Bradley (United States) Becky Pearson
88	May 12, 1985	United Virginia Bank Classic	−9 (69-66-72=207)	1 stroke	(United States) Amy Alcott

Note: Whitworth won the Colgate-Dinah Shore Winner's Circle (now known as the ANA Inspiration) before it became a major championship.

LPGA Tour playoff record (8–20)

No.	Year	Tournament	Opponent(s)	Result
1	1960	Waterloo Open	(United States) Wiffi Smith	Lost to birdie on first extra hole
2	1962	J.E. McAuliffe Memorial	(United States) Betsy Rawls	Lost on second extra hole
3	1963	San Antonio Civitan Open	(United States) Mickey Wright	Won with birdie on first extra hole
4	1966	Amarillo Ladies' Open	(United States) Mickey Wright	Won with birdie on first extra hole
5	1966	Pensacola Ladies Invitational	(United States) Sandra Haynie	Lost to par on first extra hole
6	1967	Shirley Englehorn Invitational	(United States) Shirley Englehorn	Lost to par on second extra hole
7	1967	Mickey Wright Invitational	(United States) Sandra Haynie	Lost to birdie on first extra hole
8	1968	LPGA Championship	(Canada) Sandra Post	Lost 18-hole playoff (Post:68, Whitworth:75)
9	1968	Gino Paoli Open	(United States) Marlene Hagge	Won with birdie on first extra hole
10	1969	Lady Carling Open	(United States) Mickey Wright	Won with par on first extra hole
11	1969	St. Louis Women's Invitational	(United States) Sandra Haynie (United States) Peggy Wilson	Haynie won with par on third extra hole Whitworth eliminated by birdie on first hole
12	1969	Lincoln-Mercury Open	(United States) Donna Caponi	Lost to par on first extra hole
13	1969	Corpus Christi Civitan Open	(United States) Carol Mann	Lost to par on third extra hole
14	1970	LPGA Championship	(United States) Shirley Englehorn	Lost 18-hole playoff (Englehorn:74, Whitworth:78)
15	1972	Lady Eve Open	(United States) Judy Rankin	Lost to eagle on first extra hole
16	1972	Southgate Ladies Open	(Canada) Jocelyne Bourassa	Won with par on fifth extra hole
17	1972	Dallas Civitan Open	(United States) Jane Blalock	Lost to birdie on first extra hole
18	1972	Corpus Christi Civitan Open	(United States) Jo Ann Prentice (United States) Sandra Palmer	Prentice won with birdie on tenth extra hole Whitworth eliminated by par on third hole
19	1972	Lady Errol Classic	(United States) Jane Blalock (United States) Sandra Palmer	Blalock won with birdie on third extra hole
20	1973	Dallas Civitan Open	(United States) Mary Mills	Won with par on second extra hole
21	1974	Burdine's Invitational	(United States) Sandra Palmer	Palmer won with birdie on fifth extra hole
22	1974	Lady Tara Classic	(United States) Donna Caponi (United States) Sandra Spuzich	Spuzich won with par on fifth extra hole Whitworth eliminated by par on third hole
23	1978	Lady Stroh's Open	(United States) Pat Meyers (Canada) Sandra Post	Post won with birdie on second extra hole
24	1981	CPC Women's International	(South Africa) Sally Little (United States) Hollis Stacy	Little won with birdie on first extra hole
25	1981	Coca-Cola Classic	(United States) Alice Ritzman	Won with birdie on second extra hole
26	1982	United Virginia Bank Classic	(South Africa) Sally Little	Lost to birdie on first extra hole
27	1983	Rochester International	(Japan) Ayako Okamoto (United States) Donna White	Okamoto won with birdie on third extra hole
28	1984	Rochester International	(United States) Rosie Jones	Won with par on first extra hole

=== Ladies European Tour wins ===
- 1984 Smirnoff Ladies Irish Open

=== Other wins ===
- 1962 Haig & Haig Scotch Foursome (with Mason Rudolph)
- 1966 Lagunita Invitational
- 1967 Ladies World Series of Golf
- 1968 Ladies World Series of Golf
- 1971 LPGA Four-Ball Championship (with Judy Kimball)
- 1975 Colgate Triple Crown
- 1978 Ping Classic Team Championship (with Donna Caponi)
- 1980 Portland Ping Team Championship (with Donna Caponi)
- 1981 Portland Ping Team Championship (with Donna Caponi)

== Major championships ==
=== Wins (6) ===
Year	Championship	Winning score	Margin	Runner(s)-up
1965	Titleholders Championship	−1 (71-71-74-71=287)	10 strokes	Peggy Wilson
1966	Titleholders Championship	+3 (74-70-74-73=291)	2 strokes	Judy Kimball-Simon, Mary Mills
1967	LPGA Championship	−8 (69-74-72-69=284)	1 stroke	Shirley Englehorn
1967	Women's Western Open	−11 (71-74-73-71=289)	3 strokes	Sandra Haynie
1971	Eve-LPGA Championship	−4 (71-73-70-74=288)	3 strokes	Kathy Ahern
1975	LPGA Championship	−4 (70-70-75-73=288)	1 stroke	Sandra Haynie

== See also ==
- List of golfers with most LPGA Tour wins
- List of golfers with most LPGA major championship wins
