= American Defender Classic =

Golf tournament formerly on the LPGA Tour

The American Defender Classic was a golf tournament on the LPGA Tour from 1966 to 1981. It was played in Raleigh, North Carolina at the Raleigh Country Club from 1966 to 1974 and at the North Ridge Country Club from 1975 to 1981. The tournament was the LPGA's first tournament in North Carolina. In 1975, purse was $5,700.

== Winners ==
American Defender/WRAL Golf Classic

- 1981 Donna Caponi

American Defender/WRAL Classic

- 1980 Amy Alcott

American Defender Classic

- 1978 Amy Alcott
- 1977 Kathy Whitworth
- 1976 Sue Roberts
- 1975 JoAnne Carner

American Defender-Raleigh Classic

- 1974 Jo Ann Prentice
- 1973 Judy Rankin

Raleigh Golf Classic

- 1972 Kathy Whitworth
- 1971 Kathy Whitworth

Raleigh Ladies Invitational

- 1970 Sandra Haynie
- 1969 Carol Mann
- 1968 Carol Mann
- 1967 Kathy Whitworth
- 1966 Carol Mann
