= Borden Classic (golf) =

Golf tournament formerly on the LPGA Tour

The Borden Classic was a golf tournament on the LPGA Tour from 1965 to 1978. It was played at several courses in the Columbus, Ohio area.

== Tournament locations ==
Years	Venue	Location
1965, 1967	Walnuts Hills Country Club	Columbus, Ohio
1966	Stoney Creek Country Club	Columbus, Ohio
1968-71	Raymond Memorial Golf Course	Columbus, Ohio
1972-78	Riviera Country Club	Dublin, Ohio

== Winners ==
Borden Classic

- 1978 JoAnne Carner
- 1977 JoAnne Carner
- 1976 Judy Rankin
- 1975 Carol Mann

LPGA Borden Classic

- 1974 Sharon Miller

Pabst Ladies Classic

- 1973 Judy Rankin
- 1972 Marilynn Smith

Len Immke Buick Open

- 1971 Sandra Haynie
- 1970 Mary Mills

Pabst Ladies Classic

- 1969 Susie Berning
- 1968 Carol Mann

Lady Carling Open

- 1967 Kathy Whitworth
- 1966 Clifford Ann Creed

Lady Carling Midwest Open

- 1965 Kathy Whitworth
