= 1973 LPGA Tour =

Golf tour season

1973 LPGA Tour season
- Duration: January 4, 1973 – November 4, 1973
- Number of official events: 34
- Most wins: 7 (United States) Kathy Whitworth
- Money leader: (United States) Kathy Whitworth
- Player of the Year: (United States) Kathy Whitworth
- Vare Trophy: (United States) Judy Rankin
- Rookie of the Year: (United States) Laura Baugh

The 1973 LPGA Tour was the 24th season since the LPGA Tour officially began in 1950. The season ran from January 4 to November 4. The season consisted of 34 official money events. Kathy Whitworth won the most tournaments, seven. She also led the money list with earnings of $82,864.

There were four first-time winners in 1973: Jocelyne Bourassa, Mary Lou Crocker, Sharon Miller, and Carole Jo Skala. Mickey Wright won the last of her 82 LPGA events in 1973.

The tournament results and award winners are listed below.

== Tournament results ==
The following table shows all the official money events for the 1973 season. "Date" is the ending date of the tournament. The numbers in parentheses after the winners' names are the number of wins they had on the tour up to and including that event. Majors are shown in bold.

| Date | Tournament | Location | Winner | Score | Purse ($) | 1st prize ($) |
|---|---|---|---|---|---|---|
| Jan 7 | Burdine's Invitational | Florida | (United States) Jo Ann Prentice (4) | 212 (−4) | 30,000 | 4,500 |
| Feb 11 | Naples Lely Classic | Florida | (United States) Kathy Whitworth (65) | 219 (+3) | 25,000 | 3,750 |
| Feb 18 | Pompano Beach Classic | Florida | (United States) Sandra Palmer (4) | 215 (+2) | 35,000 | 5,250 |
| Mar 11 | S&H Green Stamp Classic | Texas | (United States) Kathy Whitworth (66) | 214 (−2) | 100,000 | 20,000 |
| Mar 18 | Orange Blossom Classic | Florida | (United States) Sandra Haynie (27) | 216 (E) | 25,000 | 3,750 |
| Mar 25 | Sears Women's Classic | Florida | (United States) Carol Mann (32) | 68 (−5) | 100,000 | 15,000 |
| Apr 1 | Alamo Ladies Classic | Texas | (United States) Betsy Cullen (2) | 218 (−1) | 30,000 | 4,500 |
| Apr 15 | Colgate-Dinah Shore Winner's Circle | California | (United States) Mickey Wright (82) | 284 (−4) | 135,000 | 25,000 |
| Apr 29 | Birmingham Classic | Alabama | (United States) Gloria Ehret (2) | 217 (+1) | 33,000 | 4,950 |
| May 6 | American Defender-Raleigh Classic | North Carolina | (United States) Judy Rankin (8) | 217 (+1) | 30,000 | 4,500 |
| May 13 | Lady Carling Open | Maryland | (United States) Judy Rankin (9) | 215 (−4) | 30,000 | 4,500 |
| May 20 | Bluegrass Invitational | Kentucky | (United States) Donna Caponi (5) | 216 (−3) | 30,000 | 4,500 |
| Jun 3 | Sealy-Faberge Classic | Nevada | (United States) Kathy Cornelius (6) | 217 (+1) | 100,000 | 25,000 |
| Jun 10 | **LPGA Championship** | Massachusetts | (United States) **Mary Mills (8)** | 288 (−4) | 35,000 | 5,250 |
| Jun 17 | La Canadienne | Canada | (Canada) Jocelyne Bourassa (1) | 214 (−5) | 50,000 | 10,000 |
| Jun 24 | Heritage Village Open | Connecticut | (United States) Susie Berning (9) | 207 (−12) | 30,000 | 4,500 |
| Jul 1 | Lady Tara Classic | Georgia | (United States) Mary Mills (9) | 217 (−2) | 30,000 | 4,500 |
| Jul 8 | MARC Equity Classic | New York | (United States) Mary Lou Crocker (1) | 210 (−9) | 35,000 | 5,250 |
| Jul 15 | George Washington Classic | Pennsylvania | (United States) Carole Jo Skala (1) | 214 (−5) | 30,000 | 4,500 |
| Jul 22 | **U.S. Women's Open** | New York | (United States) **Susie Berning (10)** | 290 (+2) | 40,000 | 6,000 |
| Aug 5 | Pabst Ladies Classic | Ohio | (United States) Judy Rankin (10) | 212 (−4) | 35,000 | 5,250 |
| Aug 12 | Child & Family Services Open | Illinois | (United States) Betty Burfeindt (3) | 212 (−7) | 30,000 | 4,500 |
| Aug 19 | St. Paul Open | Minnesota | (United States) Sandra Palmer (5) | 209 (−10) | 30,000 | 4,500 |
| Aug 26 | National Jewish Hospital Open | Colorado | (United States) Sandra Palmer (6) | 210 (−3) | 30,000 | 4,500 |
| Sep 2 | Charity Golf Classic | Texas | (United States) Sandra Haynie (28) | 208 (−8) | 30,000 | 4,500 |
| Sep 9 | Dallas Civitan Open | Texas | (United States) Kathy Whitworth (67) | 213 (−3) | 33,000 | 4,950 |
| Sep 16 | Southgate Ladies Open | Kansas | (United States) Kathy Whitworth (68) | 142 (−2)^ | 25,000 | 3,750 |
| Sep 23 | Portland Ladies Open | Oregon | (United States) Kathy Whitworth (69) | 144 (−2)^ | 30,000 | 4,500 |
| Sep 30 | Cameron Park Open | California | (United States) Sandra Palmer (7) | 212 (−7) | 30,000 | 4,500 |
| Oct 7 | Lincoln-Mercury Open | California | (United States) Sandra Haynie (29) | 212 (−7) | 30,000 | 4,500 |
| Oct 14 | GAC Classic | Arizona | (United States) Judy Rankin (11) | 215 (−1) | 35,000 | 5,250 |
| Oct 21 | Waco Tribune Herald Ladies Classic | Texas | (United States) Kathy Whitworth (70) | 209 (−7) | 25,000 | 3,750 |
| Oct 28 | Corpus Christi Civitan Open | Texas | (United States) Sharon Miller (1) | 210 (−6) | 25,000 | 3,750 |
| Nov 4 | Lady Errol Classic | Florida | (United States) Kathy Whitworth (71) | 213 (−6) | 50,000 | 7,500 |

^ - weather-shortened tournament

== Awards ==
| Award | Winner | Country |
|---|---|---|
| Money winner | Kathy Whitworth (8) | United States |
| Scoring leader (Vare Trophy) | Judy Rankin | United States |
| Player of the Year | Kathy Whitworth (7) | United States |
| Rookie of the Year | Laura Baugh | United States |
