= 1973 LPGA Championship =

Coordinates: 42.151°N 71.737°W

Tournament information
- Dates: June 7–10, 1973
- Location: Sutton, Massachusetts
- Course: Pleasant Valley Country Club
- Tour: LPGA Tour
- Format: Stroke play – 72 holes

Statistics
- Par: 73
- Length: 6,130 yards (5,605 m)
- Field: 55 after cut
- Cut: 159 (+13)
- Prize fund: $35,000
- Winner's share: $5,250

Champion
- (United States) Mary Mills
- 288 (−4)

Location in the United States
Location in Massachusetts

The 1973 LPGA Championship was the 19th LPGA Championship, held June 7–10 at Pleasant Valley Country Club in Sutton, Massachusetts, southeast of Worcester.

Mary Mills, the 1964 champion, won her second LPGA Championship, a stroke ahead of runner-up Betty Burfeindt. She entered the final round one stroke behind the three co-leaders; and carded a three-under 70 to gain her third and final major title.

== Final leaderboard ==
Sunday, June 10, 1973

Place	Player	Score	To par	Money ($)
1	(United States) Mary Mills	73-73-72-70=288	−4	5,250
2	(United States) Betty Burfeindt	76-73-70-70=289	−3	3,900
3	(United States) Kathy Whitworth	71-75-71-74=291	−1	2,950
T4	(United States) Jane Blalock	77-71-69-75=292	E	2,175
T4	(United States) Donna Caponi Young	74-73-73-72=292	E	2,175
6	(Japan) Chako Higuchi	71-71-75-76=293	+1	1,625
7	(United States) Debbie Austin	74-74-72-74=294	+2	1,425
T8	(United States) Susie Berning	73-76-71-76=296	+4	1,238
T8	(United States) Sandra Palmer	74-74-71-77=296	+4	1,238
10	(United States) Sherry Wilder	73-77-73-75=298	+6	1,075
