= 1966 U.S. Women's Open =

Coordinates: 44.834°N 93.591°W

Tournament information
- Dates: June 30 – July 3, 1966
- Location: Chaska, Minnesota
- Course: Hazeltine National Golf Club
- Organized by: USGA
- Tour: LPGA Tour
- Format: Stroke play – 72 holes

Statistics
- Par: 72
- Length: 6,325 yards (5,784 m)
- Field: 99: 52 pros, 47 amateurs; 44 after cut
- Cut: 162 (+16)
- Prize fund: $20,000
- Winner's share: $4,000

Champion
- (United States) Sandra Spuzich
- 297 (+9)

Location in the United States
Location in Minnesota

The 1966 U.S. Women's Open was the 21st U.S. Women's Open, held June 30 to July 3 at Hazeltine National Golf Club in Chaska, Minnesota, a suburb southwest of Minneapolis.

Sandra Spuzich, age 29, won her only major title, a stroke ahead of runner-up Carol Mann, the defending champion. A stroke back in third was four-time champion Mickey Wright. Spuzich was the 54-hole leader by a stroke over the two former champions and played in the final pair with Mann. It was the first of seven victories on the LPGA Tour for Spuzich.

The 36-hole cut at 162 (+18) reduced the field of 99 to 44, which included ten amateurs.

Designed by Robert Trent Jones and opened four years earlier in 1962, Hazeltine later hosted two U.S. Opens and two PGA Championships; the U.S. Women's Open returned in 1977.

== Final leaderboard ==
Sunday, July 3, 1966

Place	Player	Score	To par	Money ($)
1	(United States) Sandra Spuzich	75-74-76-72=297	+9	4,000
2	(United States) Carol Mann	73-78-75-72=298	+10	2,000
3	(United States) Mickey Wright	71-78-77-73=299	+11	1,200
4	(United States) Clifford Ann Creed	76-75-76-76=303	+15	900
T5	(United States) Sandra Haynie	79-75-78-74=306	+18	750
T5	(United States) Kathy Whitworth	80-74-76-76=306	+18	750
7	(United States) Judy Torluemke	77-78-79-73=307	+19	600
8	(United States) Mary Mills	79-73-76-80=308	+20	550
T9	(United States) Barbara Romack	80-77-77-77=311	+23	446
T9	(United States) Gloria Ehret	82-75-75-79=311	+23	446
T9	(United States) Peggy Wilson	76-76-81-78=311	+23	446
T9	(United States) Shirley Englehorn	83-77-75-76=311	+23	446
T9	(United States) Susie Maxwell	80-79-75-77=311	+23	446
T9	(United States) Shelley Hamlin (a)	81-74-80-76=311	+23	0
