= 1974 LPGA Championship =

Coordinates: 42.151°N 71.737°W

Tournament information
- Dates: June 20–23, 1974
- Location: Sutton, Massachusetts
- Course: Pleasant Valley Country Club
- Tour: LPGA Tour
- Format: Stroke play – 72 holes

Statistics
- Par: 73
- Length: 6,130 yards (5,605 m)
- Field: 88 players
- Prize fund: $50,000
- Winner's share: $7,000

Champion
- (United States) Sandra Haynie
- 288 (−4)

Location in the United States
Location in Massachusetts

The 1974 LPGA Championship was the 20th LPGA Championship, held June 20–23 at Pleasant Valley Country Club in Sutton, Massachusetts, southeast of Worcester.

Sandra Haynie, the 1965 champion, won her second LPGA Championship, two strokes ahead of JoAnne Carner. It was the second of her four major titles.

== Final leaderboard ==
Sunday, June 23, 1974

Place	Player	Score	To par	Money ($)
1	(United States) Sandra Haynie	69-73-73-73=288	−4	7,000
2	(United States) JoAnne Carner	73-70-75-72=290	−2	5,200
3	(United States) Sandra Palmer	74-66-76-75=291	−1	3,600
4	(Canada) Sandra Post	71-78-74-70=293	+1	2,860
5	(United States) Murle Breer	73-72-75-74=294	+2	2,250
T6	(United States) Jane Blalock	73-77-71-74=295	+3	1,650
T6	(United States) Mary Mills	69-74-76-76=295	+3	1,650
T6	(United States) Judy Rankin	77-73-74-71=295	+3	1,650
T6	(United States) Sue Roberts	78-72-75-70=295	+3	1,650
T10	(West Germany) Gerda Boykin	76-75-71-74=296	+4	1,150
T10	(United States) Jerilyn Britz	74-73-74-75=296	+4	1,150
T10	(United States) Bonnie Bryant	73-73-76-74=296	+4	1,150
T10	(United States) Donna Caponi	73-75-71-77=296	+4	1,150
T10	(United States) Kathy Whitworth	77-71-73-75=296	+4	1,150
