= 1966 LPGA Tour =

Golf tour season

1966 LPGA Tour season
- Duration: March 17, 1966 – December 4, 1966
- Number of official events: 32
- Most wins: 9 (United States) Kathy Whitworth
- Money leader: (United States) Kathy Whitworth
- Player of the Year: (United States) Kathy Whitworth
- Vare Trophy: (United States) Kathy Whitworth
- Rookie of the Year: (United States) Jan Ferraris

The 1966 LPGA Tour was the 17th season since the LPGA Tour officially began in 1950. The season ran from March 17 to December 4. The season consisted of 32 official money events. Kathy Whitworth won the most tournaments, nine. She also led the money list with earnings of $33,517.

The season saw the first tournament in Canada, the Supertest Ladies Open. An unofficial event, The Lagunita Invitational, was played in Venezuela. This was the last year that the Titleholders Championship, an LPGA major, would be played in Georgia. It would return for one final year in 1972. The LPGA introduced the Player of the Year in 1966, won by Kathy Whitworth. There were two first-time winners in 1966: Gloria Ehret and Sandra Spuzich.

The tournament results and award winners are listed below.

== Tournament results ==
The following table shows all the official money events for the 1966 season. "Date" is the ending date of the tournament. The numbers in parentheses after the winners' names are the number of wins they had on the tour up to and including that event. Majors are shown in bold.

Date	Tournament	Location	Winner	Score	Purse ($)	1st prize ($)
Mar 20	St. Petersburg Women's Open	Florida	(United States) Marilynn Smith (15)	285	11,000	1,650
Mar 27	Louise Suggs Delray Beach Invitational	Florida	(United States) Marilynn Smith (16)	211	8,500	1,275
Apr 3	Venice Ladies Open	Florida	(United States) Mickey Wright (66)	217	8,500	1,275
Apr 17	Raleigh Ladies Invitational	North Carolina	(United States) Carol Mann (4)	216	10,000	1,500
Apr 24	Peach Blossom Invitational	South Carolina	(United States) Carol Mann (5)	216	8,500	1,275
May 1	Shreveport Kiwanis Club Invitational	Louisiana	(United States) Mickey Wright (67)	217	9,000	1,350
May 8	Tall City Open	Texas	(United States) Kathy Whitworth (20)	208	12,500	1,875
May 15	Dallas Civitan Invitational	Texas	(United States) Clifford Ann Creed (7)	285	15,000	2,250
May 22	Babe Zaharias Open	Texas	(United States) Shirley Englehorn (5)	209	9,000	1,350
May 29	Baton Rouge Ladies Invitational	Louisiana	(United States) Carol Mann (6)	209	10,000	1,500
Jun 5	Clayton Federal Invitational	Missouri	(United States) Kathy Whitworth (21)	208	12,500	1,875
Jun 12	Bluegrass Ladies Invitational	Kentucky	(United States) Mickey Wright (68)	210	10,000	1,500
Jun 19	Milwaukee Jaycee Open	Wisconsin	(United States) Kathy Whitworth (22)	273	13,000	1,950
Jun 26	Waterloo Women's Open Invitational	Iowa	(United States) Carol Mann (7)	214	10,000	1,500
Jul 3	**U.S. Women's Open**	Minnesota	(United States) **Sandra Spuzich (1)**	297	20,000	4,000
Jul 10	Buckeye Savings Invitational	Ohio	(United States) Sandra Haynie (8)	205	13,000	1,950
Jul 17	Lady Carling Open	Ohio	(United States) Clifford Ann Creed (8)	221	17,500	2,625
Jul 30	Supertest Ladies Open	Canada	(United States) Kathy Whitworth (23)	213	15,000	2,250
Aug 7	Lady Carling Open	Massachusetts	(United States) Kathy Whitworth (24)	217	15,000	2,250
Aug 14	Lady Carling Open	Maryland	(United States) Kathy Whitworth (25)	214	12,500	1,875
Aug 21	**Women's Western Open**	Wisconsin	(United States) **Mickey Wright (69)**	302	10,000	1,500
Aug 28	Glass City Classic	Ohio	(United States) Sandra Haynie (9)	213	25,000	3,750
Sep 11	Pacific Ladies' Classic	Oregon	(United States) Mickey Wright (70)	284	10,000	1,500
Sep 18	Shirley Englehorn Invitational	Idaho	(United States) Mickey Wright (71)	203	10,000	1,500
Sep 25	**LPGA Championship**	Nevada	(United States) **Gloria Ehret (1)**	282	16,500	2,475
Oct 2	Mickey Wright Invitational	California	(United States) Mickey Wright (72)	289	10,000	1,500
Oct 30	Las Cruces Ladies Open	New Mexico	(United States) Kathy Whitworth (26)	214	9,000	1,350
Nov 6	Amarillo Ladies' Open	Texas	(United States) Kathy Whitworth (27)	215	10,000	1,500
Nov 13	Alamo Ladies' Open	Texas	(United States) Sandra Haynie (10)	213	12,500	1,875
Nov 20	The Success Open	Texas	(United States) Clifford Ann Creed (9)	207	10,000	1,500
Nov 27	**Titleholders Championship**	Georgia	(United States) **Kathy Whitworth (28)**	291	10,000	1,500
Dec 4	Pensacola Ladies Invitational	Florida	(United States) Sandra Haynie (11)	218	10,000	1,500

== Awards ==
Award	Winner	Country
Money winner	Kathy Whitworth (2)	United States
Scoring leader (Vare Trophy)	Kathy Whitworth (2)	United States
Player of the Year	Kathy Whitworth	United States
Rookie of the Year	Jan Ferraris	United States
