= 1973 U.S. Women's Open =

Coordinates: 43.123°N 77.537°W

Tournament information
- Dates: July 19–22, 1973
- Location: Rochester, New York
- Course: Country Club of Rochester
- Organized by: USGA
- Tour: LPGA Tour
- Format: Stroke play – 72 holes

Statistics
- Par: 72
- Length: 6,120 yards (5,596 m)
- Field: 147: 99 pros, 48 amateurs 59 after cut
- Cut: 155 (+11)
- Prize fund: $40,000
- Winner's share: $6,000

Champion
- (United States) Susie Berning
- 290 (+2)

Location in the United States
Location in New York

The 1973 U.S. Women's Open was the 28th U.S. Women's Open, held July 19–22 at the Country Club of Rochester in Rochester, New York.

Defending champion Susie Berning won the third of her three U.S. Women's Open titles, five strokes ahead of runners-up Gloria Ehret and Shelley Hamlin. After a three-under 69 in the third round, Berning was the co-leader with Pam Higgins, two strokes ahead of 36-hole leader Sharon Miller.

Berning was the third of seven to successfully defend the championship, following Mickey Wright in 1959 and Donna Caponi in 1970; it was the last of her four major titles.

The championship was held at the course twenty years earlier in 1953, the first Women's Open conducted by the United States Golf Association (USGA). It was the second consecutive Women's Open played in the state of New York; the 1972 edition was at Winged Foot in Mamaroneck.

== Final leaderboard ==
Sunday, July 22, 1973

Place	Player	Score	To par	Money ($)
1	(United States) Susie Berning	72-77-69-72=290	+2	6,000
T2	(United States) Gloria Ehret	75-75-74-71=295	+7	2,500
T2	(United States) Shelley Hamlin	76-70-75-74=295	+7	2,500
4	(United States) Anne Sander (a)	74-72-76-74=296	+8	0
5	(United States) Pam Higgins	72-76-70-79=297	+9	1,600
T6	(United States) Mary Mills	74-73-75-76=298	+10	1,400
T6	(United States) Sandra Palmer	76-72-74-76=298	+10	1,400
T6	(United States) Judy Rankin	77-72-75-74=298	+10	1,400
T9	(United States) Jane Blalock	78-76-72-73=299	+11	$1,117
T9	(United States) Mary Lou Crocker	75-78-69-77=299	+11	$1,117
T9	(United States) Sue Roberts	71-81-73-74=299	+11	$1,117
