= 1974 LPGA Tour =

Golf tour season

1974 LPGA Tour season
- Duration: February 1, 1974 – November 24, 1974
- Number of official events: 27
- Most wins: 6 (United States) JoAnne Carner, (United States) Sandra Haynie
- Money leader: (United States) JoAnne Carner
- Player of the Year: (United States) JoAnne Carner
- Vare Trophy: (United States) JoAnne Carner
- Rookie of the Year: (Australia) Jan Stephenson

The 1974 LPGA Tour was the 25th season since the LPGA Tour officially began in 1950. The season ran from February 1 to November 24. The season consisted of 32 official money events. JoAnne Carner and Sandra Haynie won the most tournaments, six each. Carner led the money list with earnings of $87,094.

The season saw the first tournament in Mexico, the Bing Crosby International Classic. There were three first-time winners in 1974: Bonnie Bryant, Gail Denenberg, and Sue Roberts. Bryant was the first, and through 2016 only, left-handed golfer to win on the LPGA Tour.

Kathy Whitworth won the LPGA's annual tour stop in St. Petersburg for a fifth time. Only three other golfers in tour history have won the same event five times.

The tournament results and award winners are listed below.

== Tournament results ==
The following table shows all the official money events for the 1974 season. "Date" is the ending date of the tournament. The numbers in parentheses after the winners' names are the number of wins they had on the tour up to and including that event. Majors are shown in bold.

Date	Tournament	Location	Winner	Score	Purse ($)	1st prize ($)
Feb 3	Burdine's Invitational	Florida	(United States) Sandra Palmer (8)	215 (−4)	33,000	4,950
Feb 10	Sears Women's Classic	Florida	(United States) Gail Denenberg (1)	71 (−2)	100,000	15,000
Feb 17	Naples Lely Classic	Florida	(United States) Carol Mann (33)	209 (−10)	38,000	5,400
Mar 3	Orange Blossom Classic	Florida	(United States) Kathy Whitworth (72)	209 (−7)	30,000	4,250
Mar 10	S&H Green Stamp Classic	Texas	(United States) Carol Mann (34)	219 (+3)	100,000	20,000
Mar 17	Bing Crosby International Classic	Mexico	(United States) Jane Blalock (8)	215 (−1)	30,000	4,250
Apr 21	Colgate-Dinah Shore Winner's Circle	California	(United States) Jo Ann Prentice (5)	289 (+1)	179,000	32,000
Apr 28	Birmingham Classic	Alabama	(United States) Jane Blalock (9)	211 (−5)	35,000	5,000
May 5	Lady Tara Classic	Georgia	(United States) Sandra Spuzich (3)	219 (E)	35,000	5,000
May 12	American Defender-Raleigh Classic	North Carolina	(United States) Jo Ann Prentice (6)	137 (−7)^	35,000	5,000
May 19	Bluegrass Invitational	Kentucky	(United States) JoAnne Carner (5)	215 (−4)	35,000	5,000
May 26	Hoosier LPGA Classic	Indiana	(United States) JoAnne Carner (6)	213 (−6)	35,000	5,000
Jun 2	Baltimore Classic	Maryland	(United States) Judy Rankin (12)	144 (−2)^	40,000	5,700
Jun 9	Desert Inn Classic	Nevada	(United States) JoAnne Carner (7)	284 (−4)	100,000	20,000
Jun 16	Lawson's LPGA Open	Ohio	(United States) Sandra Haynie (30)	215 (−1)	40,000	5,700
Jun 23	**LPGA Championship**	Massachusetts	(United States) **Sandra Haynie (31)**	288 (−4)	50,000	7,000
Jun 30	Peter Jackson Ladies Classic	Canada	(United States) Carole Jo Skala (2)	208 (−11)	60,000	12,000
Jul 7	Niagara Frontier Classic	New York	(United States) Sue Roberts (1)	213 (−6)	35,000	5,000
Jul 14	LPGA Borden Classic	Ohio	(United States) Sharon Miller (2)	211 (−5)	40,000	5,700
Jul 21	**U.S. Women's Open**	Illinois	(United States) **Sandra Haynie (32)**	295 (+7)	40,000	6,073
Jul 28	Wheeling Ladies Classic	West Virginia	(United States) Carole Jo Skala (3)	212 (−4)	35,000	5,000
Aug 4	George Washington Classic	Pennsylvania	(United States) Sandra Haynie (33)	213 (−6)	40,000	5,700
Aug 18	St. Paul Open	Minnesota	(United States) JoAnne Carner (8)	212 (−7)	35,000	5,000
Aug 24	National Jewish Hospital Open	Colorado	(United States) Sandra Haynie (34)	213 (−6)	35,000	5,000
Sep 1	Southgate Ladies Open	Kansas	(United States) Jane Blalock (10) (tie) (United States) Sue Roberts (2)	142 (−2)^	35,000	4,375 each
Sep 8	Dallas Civitan Open	Texas	(United States) JoAnne Carner (9)	217 (+1)	40,000	5,700
Sep 15	Charity Golf Classic	Texas	(United States) Sandra Haynie (35)	208 (−11)	40,000	5,700
Sep 29	Portland Ladies Classic	Oregon	(United States) JoAnne Carner (10)	211 (−5)	35,000	5,000
Oct 6	Sacramento Union Ladies Classic	California	(United States) Carole Jo Skala (4)	213 (−6)	35,000	5,000
Oct 21	Cubic Corporation Classic	California	(United States) Sandra Palmer (9)	215 (−1)	35,000	5,000
Nov 17	Bill Branch LPGA Classic	Florida	(United States) Bonnie Bryant (1)	209 (−7)	40,000	5,700
Nov 24	Lady Errol Classic	Florida	(United States) Jane Blalock (11)	215 (−1)	35,000	5,000

^ - weather-shortened tournament

== Awards ==
Award	Winner	Country
Money winner	JoAnne Carner	United States
Scoring leader (Vare Trophy)	JoAnne Carner	United States
Player of the Year	JoAnne Carner	United States
Rookie of the Year	Jan Stephenson	Australia
