= 1979 U.S. Women's Open =

Coordinates: 41.187°N 73.226°W

Tournament information
- Dates: July 12–15, 1979
- Location: Fairfield, Connecticut
- Course: Brooklawn Country Club
- Organized by: USGA
- Tour: LPGA Tour

Statistics
- Par: 71
- Length: 6,010 yards (5,496 m)
- Field: 153 players, 56 after cut
- Cut: 152 (+10)
- Prize fund: $125,000
- Winner's share: $19,000

Champion
- (United States) Jerilyn Britz
- 284 (E)

Location in the United States
Location in Connecticut

The 1979 U.S. Women's Open was the 34th U.S. Women's Open, held July 12–15 at Brooklawn Country Club in Fairfield, Connecticut.

Jerilyn Britz won her first LPGA Tour event (and only major), two shots ahead of runners-up Debbie Massey and Sandra Palmer.

Co-leading after the first round and leading after the second, Britz shot a four-over-par 75 in the third round on Saturday. She entered the final round three strokes behind Massey and shot a two-under 69 for an even-par 284 total.

== Final leaderboard ==
Sunday, July 15, 1979

| Place | Player | Score | To par | Money ($) |
|---|---|---|---|---|
| 1 | (United States) Jerilyn Britz | 70-70-75-69=284 | E | 19,000 |
| T2 | (United States) Debbie Massey | 70-72-70-74=286 | +2 | 9,200 |
| T2 | (United States) Sandra Palmer | 73-69-74-70=286 | +2 | 9,200 |
| 4 | (South Africa) Sally Little | 71-71-74-71=287 | +3 | 6,500 |
| T5 | (United States) Jo Ann Washam | 76-74-72-67=289 | +5 | 4,566 |
| T5 | (United States) Mary Dwyer | 73-71-74-71=289 | +5 | 4,566 |
| T5 | (United States) Susie Berning | 79-66-71-73=289 | +5 | 4,566 |
| T8 | (United States) Donna Caponi | 72-74-74-70=290 | +6 | 3,400 |
| T8 | (United States) Joyce Kazmierski | 76-72-72-70=290 | +6 | 3,400 |
| T8 | (United States) Laura Baugh | 73-72-77-68=290 | +6 | 3,400 |
