= 1977 LPGA Tour =

Golf tour season

1977 LPGA Tour season
- Duration: February 11, 1977 – November 13, 1977
- Number of official events: 32
- Most wins: 5 (United States) Debbie Austin, (United States) Judy Rankin
- Money leader: (United States) Judy Rankin
- Player of the Year: (United States) Judy Rankin
- Vare Trophy: (United States) Judy Rankin
- Rookie of the Year: (United States) Debbie Massey

The 1977 LPGA Tour was the 28th season since the LPGA Tour officially began in 1950. The season ran from February 11 to November 13. The season consisted of 32 official money events. Debbie Austin and Judy Rankin won the most tournaments, five each. Rankin led the money list with earnings of $122,890, becoming the first player to win $100,000 in a season.

There were six first-time winners in 1977: Debbie Austin, Silvia Bertolaccini, Vivian Brownlee, Bonnie Lauer, Debbie Massey, and Hollis Stacy.

The tournament results and award winners are listed below.

== Tournament results ==
The following table shows all the official money events for the 1977 season. "Date" is the ending date of the tournament. The numbers in parentheses after the winners' names are the number of wins they had on the tour up to and including that event. Majors are shown in bold.

| Date | Tournament | Location | Winner | Score | Purse ($) | 1st prize ($) |
|---|---|---|---|---|---|---|
| Feb 13 | American Cancer Society Classic | Florida | (United States) Pam Higgins (2) | 212 (−4) | 50,000 | 7,500 |
| Feb 20 | Orange Blossom Classic | Florida | (United States) Judy Rankin (20) | 208 (−8) | 50,000 | 7,500 |
| Feb 27 | Bent Tree Classic | Florida | (United States) Judy Rankin (21) | 209 (−7) | 100,000 | 15,000 |
| Mar 27 | Kathryn Crosby/Honda Civic Classic | California | (United States) Sandra Palmer (15) | 281 (−7) | 150,000 | 22,500 |
| Apr 3 | Colgate-Dinah Shore Winner's Circle | California | (United States) Kathy Whitworth (77) | 289 (+1) | 240,000 | 36,000 |
| Apr 17 | Women's International | South Carolina | (United States) Sandra Palmer (16) | 281 (−7) | 80,000 | 12,000 |
| Apr 24 | American Defender Classic | North Carolina | (United States) Kathy Whitworth (78) | 206 (−10) | 50,000 | 7,500 |
| May 1 | Birmingham Classic | Alabama | (United States) Debbie Austin (1) | 207 (−9) | 60,000 | 9,000 |
| May 8 | Lady Tara Classic | Georgia | (United States) Hollis Stacy (1) | 209 (−10) | 50,000 | 7,500 |
| May 15 | Greater Baltimore Golf Classic | Maryland | (United States) Jane Blalock (15) | 209 (−10) | 55,000 | 8,250 |
| May 22 | LPGA Coca-Cola Classic | New Jersey | (United States) Kathy Whitworth (79) | 202 (−11) | 77,000 | 11,500 |
| May 29 | Lady Keystone Open | Pennsylvania | (United States) Sandra Spuzich (4) | 201 (−9) | 50,000 | 7,500 |
| Jun 5 | Talk Tournament '77 | New York | (United States) JoAnne Carner (18) | 284 (−4) | 100,000 | 15,000 |
| Jun 12 | **LPGA Championship** | South Carolina | (Japan) **Hisako "Chako" Higuchi (2)** | 279 (−9) | 150,000 | 22,500 |
| Jun 19 | Mayflower Classic | Indiana | (United States) Judy Rankin (22) | 212 (−4) | 50,000 | 7,500 |
| Jun 26 | Hoosier Classic | Indiana | (United States) Debbie Austin (2) | 207 (−9) | 50,000 | 7,500 |
| Jul 3 | Peter Jackson Classic | Canada | (United States) Judy Rankin (23) | 212 (−4) | 80,000 | 12,000 |
| Jul 10 | Bankers Trust Classic | New York | (United States) Pat Bradley (2) | 213 (−6) | 75,000 | 11,000 |
| Jul 17 | Borden Classic | Ohio | (United States) JoAnne Carner (19) | 207 (−9) | 80,000 | 12,000 |
| Jul 24 | **U.S. Women's Open** | Minnesota | (United States) **Hollis Stacy (2)** | 292 (+4) | 75,000 | 11,040 |
| Jul 31 | Pocono Northeast Classic | Pennsylvania | (United States) Debbie Austin (3) | 213 (−6) | 75,000 | 11,000 |
| Aug 6 | Colgate European Women's Open | England | (United States) Judy Rankin (24) | 281 (−15) | 100,000 | 15,000 |
| Aug 14 | Long Island Charity Classic | New York | (United States) Debbie Austin (4) | 279 (−9) | 100,000 | 15,000 |
| Aug 21 | Wheeling Classic | West Virginia | (United States) Debbie Austin (5) | 209 (−7) | 50,000 | 7,500 |
| Aug 28 | Patty Berg Classic | Minnesota | (United States) Bonnie Lauer (1) | 212 (−7) | 55,000 | 8,250 |
| Sep 4 | Rail Muscular Dystrophy Classic | Illinois | (United States) Hollis Stacy (3) | 271 (−17) | 100,000 | 15,000 |
| Sep 11 | National Jewish Hospital Open | Colorado | (United States) JoAnne Carner (20) | 210 (−6) | 50,000 | 7,500 |
| Sep 25 | The Sarah Coventry | California | (United States) Jane Blalock (16) | 282 (−10) | 100,000 | 15,000 |
| Oct 2 | Dallas Civitan Open | Texas | (United States) Vivian Brownlee (1) | 217 (+1) | 50,000 | 7,500 |
| Oct 9 | Houston Exchange Clubs Classic | Texas | (United States) Amy Alcott (4) | 208 (−8) | 50,000 | 7,500 |
| Nov 3 | Mizuno Japan Classic | Japan | (United States) Debbie Massey (1) | 220 (−2) | 100,000 | 15,000 |
| Nov 13 | Colgate Far East Open | Singapore | (Argentina) Silvia Bertolaccini (1) | 214 (−2) | 100,000 | 15,000 |

== Awards ==
| Award | Winner | Country |
|---|---|---|
| Money winner | Judy Rankin (2) | United States |
| Scoring leader (Vare Trophy) | Judy Rankin (3) | United States |
| Player of the Year | Judy Rankin (2) | United States |
| Rookie of the Year | Debbie Massey | United States |
