= 1965 U.S. Women's Open =

Coordinates: 39.370°N 74.542°W

Tournament information
- Dates: July 1–4, 1965
- Location: Northfield, New Jersey
- Course: Atlantic City Country Club
- Organized by: USGA
- Tour: LPGA Tour
- Format: Stroke play – 72 holes

Statistics
- Par: 72
- Length: 6,220 yards (5,688 m)
- Field: 82 players, 41 after cut
- Cut: 159 (+15)
- Prize fund: $17,780
- Winner's share: $4,000

Champion
- (United States) Carol Mann
- 290 (+2)

Location in the United States
Location in New Jersey

The 1965 U.S. Women's Open was the 20th U.S. Women's Open, held July 1–4 at Atlantic City Country Club in Northfield, New Jersey.

Carol Mann, age 24, won her only U.S. Women's Open, two strokes ahead of runner-up Kathy Cornelius, the 1956 champion. It was the second of Mann's two major championships, who had an opening round of 78 (+6); at the 72nd hole on Sunday, she needed a par to win and made a birdie.

This was the first U.S. Women's Open scheduled for four days since 1952, with the final round on Sunday. From 1953 through 1964, the third and fourth rounds were both played on Saturday; the U.S. Open also moved its final round to Sunday in 1965. The purse was substantially increased, with a winner's share of $4,000, up from $2,200 in 1964.

Defending champion Mickey Wright, a four-time winner, had an injury to her left hand and did not compete.

The course previously hosted the championship in 1948 and it returned in 1975.

== Final leaderboard ==
Sunday, July 4, 1965

Place	Player	Score	To par	Money ($)
1	(United States) Carol Mann	78-70-70-72=290	+2	4,000
2	(United States) Kathy Cornelius	71-75-77-69=292	+4	2,000
3	(United States) Marilynn Smith	75-74-74-71=294	+6	1,200
4	(United States) Mary Mills	76-76-70-73=295	+7	900
T5	(United States) Susie Maxwell	75-75-75-71=296	+8	800
T5	(United States) Helen Sigel Wilson (a)	78-72-75-71=296	+8	0
7	(United States) Ruth Jessen	77-76-71-75=299	+11	700
8	(United States) Louise Suggs	76-77-71-76=300	+12	600
9	(Australia) Margie Masters	81-74-79-67=301	+13	550
T10	(United States) Clifford Ann Creed	77-76-76-73=302	+14	485
T10	(United States) Judy Torluemke	76-74-72-80=302	+14	485
