= 1970 U.S. Women's Open =

Coordinates: 35.778°N 95.321°W

Tournament information
- Dates: July 2–5, 1970
- Location: Muskogee, Oklahoma
- Course: Muskogee Country Club
- Organized by: USGA
- Tour: LPGA Tour
- Format: Stroke play – 72 holes

Statistics
- Par: 71
- Length: 6,210 yards (5,678 m)
- Prize fund: $30,000
- Winner's share: $5,000

Champion
- (United States) Donna Caponi
- 287 (+3)

Location in the United States
Location in Oklahoma

The 1970 U.S. Women's Open was the 25th U.S. Women's Open, held July 2–5 at Muskogee Country Club in Muskogee, Oklahoma.

Defending champion Donna Caponi won the second of her four major titles, one stroke ahead of runners-up Sandra Haynie and Sandra Spuzich. Caponi's four-foot (1.3 m) putt for a double bogey on the final hole hung on the lip before falling to avoid a Monday playoff. She was the second of seven to successfully defend the championship, following Mickey Wright in 1959. Caponi entered the final round with a four-stroke lead and shot a 77 (+6).

== Final leaderboard ==
Sunday, July 5, 1970

Place	Player	Score	To par	Money ($)
1	(United States) Donna Caponi	69-70-71-77=287	+3	5,000
T2	(United States) Sandra Haynie	71-72-71-74=288	+4	2,000
T2	(United States) Sandra Spuzich	72-72-70-74=288	+4	2,000
T4	(United States) Kathy Whitworth	71-71-76-71=289	+5	1,100
T4	(United States) Sandra Palmer	73-71-71-74=289	+5	1,100
6	(United States) Sharon Miller	70-77-74-69=290	+6	900
7	(United States) Jo Ann Prentice	72-75-70-74=291	+7	850
8	(United States) Carol Mann	69-70-77-76=292	+8	800
T9	(United States) Clifford Ann Creed	73-73-74-73=293	+9	725
T9	(United States) Shirley Englehorn	70-74-74-75=293	+9	725
