= 1965 LPGA Championship =

Coordinates: 36.128°N 115.125°W

Tournament information
- Dates: September 23–26, 1965
- Location: Las Vegas, Nevada
- Course: Stardust Country Club
- Tour: LPGA Tour
- Format: Stroke play – 72 holes

Statistics
- Par: 71
- Length: 5,903 yards (5,398 m)
- Field: 41 players
- Cut: none
- Prize fund: $17,500
- Winner's share: $2,475

Champion
- (United States) Sandra Haynie
- 279 (−5)

Location in the United States
Location in Nevada

The 1965 LPGA Championship was the eleventh LPGA Championship, held September 23–26 at Stardust Country Club in Las Vegas, Nevada.

Sandra Haynie, age 22, won the first of her two LPGA Championship titles, one stroke ahead of runner-up Clifford Ann Creed. In her fifth season on tour, it was the seventh win for Haynie and the first of her four career major victories. Defending champion Mary Mills was twelve strokes back, in a tie for seventh.

It was the fifth of six consecutive LPGA Championships at Stardust, which opened four years earlier. After several ownership and name changes, it became Las Vegas National Golf Club in 1998.

Four-time champion Mickey Wright did not compete due to a wrist injury.

== Final leaderboard ==
Sunday, September 26, 1965

| Place | Player | Score | To par | Money ($) |
|---|---|---|---|---|
| 1 | (United States) Sandra Haynie | 70-68-69-72=279 | −5 | 2,475 |
| 2 | (United States) Clifford Ann Creed | 71-70-66-73=280 | −4 | 1,900 |
| 3 | (United States) Carol Mann | 69-74-70-72=285 | +1 | 1,540 |
| 4 | (United States) Kathy Whitworth | 70-72-75-69=286 | +2 | 1,240 |
| T5 | (United States) Kathy Cornelius | 70-69-75-75=289 | +5 | 958 |
| T5 | (United States) Gloria Ehret | 69-75-73-72=289 | +5 | 958 |
| T7 | (United States) Marlene Hagge | 70-74-72-75=291 | +7 | 685 |
| T7 | (United States) Mary Mills | 70-74-71-76=291 | +7 | 685 |
| T9 | (United States) Judy Kimball | 75-70-72-75=292 | +8 | 538 |
| T9 | (United States) Marilynn Smith | 75-75-71-71=292 | +8 | 538 |
