= 1976 LPGA Championship =

Coordinates: 39.445°N 76.581°W

Tournament information
- Dates: May 27–30, 1976
- Location: Lutherville, Maryland
- Course: Pine Ridge Golf Course
- Tour: LPGA Tour
- Format: Stroke play – 72 holes

Statistics
- Par: 73
- Length: 6,449 yards (5,897 m)
- Field: 98 players, 54 after cut
- Cut: 152 (+6)
- Prize fund: $55,000
- Winner's share: $8,000

Champion
- (United States) Betty Burfeindt
- 287 (−5)

Location in the United States
Location in Maryland

The 1976 LPGA Championship was the 22nd LPGA Championship, held May 27–30 at Pine Ridge Golf Course in Lutherville, Maryland, a suburb north of Baltimore.

Betty Burfeindt won her only major title, a stroke ahead of runner-up Judy Rankin. It was her fourth and final win on the LPGA Tour.

== Final leaderboard ==
Sunday, May 30, 1976

Place	Player	Score	To par	Money ($)
1	(United States) Betty Burfeindt	71-72-73-71=287	−5	8,000
2	(United States) Judy Rankin	72-75-70-71=288	−4	5,650
3	(United States) Carole Jo Callison	71-74-73-72=290	−2	4,300
T4	(United States) Jane Blalock	75-74-71-71=291	−1	2,650
T4	(United States) Donna Caponi	74-73-72-72=291	−1	2,650
T4	(Australia) Jan Stephenson	71-75-72-73=291	−1	2,650
T7	(United States) Clifford Ann Creed	74-73-74-71=292	E	1,763
T7	(United States) Hollis Stacy	69-73-79-71=292	E	1,763
9	(Japan) Chako Higuchi	73-71-74-75=293	+1	1,525
T10	(United States) Kathy Ahern	73-73-76-72=294	+2	1,375
T10	(United States) Sharon Miller	74-68-76-76=294	+2	1,375
