= Jerilyn Britz =

American professional golfer (born 1943)

Personal information
- Nationality: United States
- Born: January 1, 1943 (age 83) Minneapolis, Minnesota, U.S.
- Height: 5 ft 6 in (1.68 m)

Career
- Sport: Golf
- College: Mankato State College; University of New Mexico
- Turned professional: 1974
- Former tour: LPGA Tour (1974–99)
- Professional wins: 2

Number of wins by tour
- LPGA Tour: 2

Best results in LPGA major championships (wins: 1)
- Chevron Championship: T10: 1986
- Women's PGA C'ship: 2nd/T2: 1979, 1981
- U.S. Women's Open: Won: 1979
- du Maurier Classic: T23: 1988

Jerilyn Britz (born January 1, 1943) was an American professional golfer on the LPGA Tour. She won the 1979 U.S. Women's Open.

== Early life and amateur career ==
Born in Minneapolis, Minnesota, Britz attended Mankato State College and the University of New Mexico.

Britz spent five years working as a high school teacher and three years as a college instructor.

== Career ==
She made her LPGA Tour debut at age 31 in 1974.

During her 26-year career on the tour, Britz won twice. Her first win came in 1979 at a major championship, the U.S. Women's Open; the second was at the Mary Kay Classic in Texas in 1980. Britz also had two runner-up finishes in major championships, at the LPGA Championship in 1979 and 1981. Her best finish on the LPGA Tour money list was 14th in 1980, and she played her last tour event in 1999.

Britz finished fifth in the 1980 Women's Superstars competition.

== Awards and honors ==
- In 1979, she was awarded Golf Digest’s Most Improved Golfer of the Year award.
- In 1979, she was also awarded the Peter Jackson Award.
- She is in the Minnesota State Maverick Athletic Hall of Fame.

== Professional wins (2) ==
=== LPGA Tour wins (2) ===
Legend
LPGA Tour major championships (1)
Other LPGA Tour (1)

No.	Date	Tournament	Winning score	Margin of victory	Runner(s)-up
1	Jul 15, 1979	U.S. Women's Open	E (70-70-75-69=284)	2 strokes	(United States) Debbie Massey (United States) Sandra Palmer
2	Sep, 28 1980	Mary Kay Classic	−5 (70-69=139)	Playoff	(United States) Nancy Lopez

LPGA Tour playoff record (1–0)

No.	Year	Tournament	Opponent	Result
1	1980	Mary Kay Classic	(United States) Nancy Lopez	Won with birdie on second extra hole

== Major championships ==
=== Wins (1) ===
Year	Championship	Winning score	Margin	Runners-up
1979	U.S. Women's Open	E (70-70-75-69=284)	2 strokes	(United States) Debbie Massey, (United States) Sandra Palmer
