= 1969 U.S. Women's Open =

Coordinates: 30.543°N 87.235°W

Tournament information
- Dates: June 26–29, 1969
- Location: Pensacola, Florida
- Course: Scenic Hills Country Club
- Organized by: USGA
- Tour: LPGA Tour
- Format: Stroke play – 72 holes

Statistics
- Par: 73
- Prize fund: $31,040
- Winner's share: $5,000

Champion
- (United States) Donna Caponi
- 294 (+2)
- Location in the United States Location in Florida

The 1969 U.S. Women's Open was the 24th U.S. Women's Open, held June 26–29 at Scenic Hills Country Club in Pensacola, Florida.

Donna Caponi, age 24, won the first of her two consecutive U.S. Women's Opens, one stroke ahead of runner-up Peggy Wilson. It was the first of four major titles for Caponi and the first of 24 victories on the LPGA Tour.

Caponi was five strokes behind Ruth Jessen at the start of the final round, played in oppressive 108 °F (42 °C) heat and humidity. After hitting her tee shot on the 72nd hole, there was a brief weather delay due to a thunderstorm and she returned with a birdie for a final round 69 (−4).

== Final leaderboard ==
Sunday, June 29, 1969

| Place | Player | Score | To par | Money ($) |
|---|---|---|---|---|
| 1 | (United States) Donna Caponi | 74-76-75-69=294 | +2 | 5,000 |
| 2 | (United States) Peggy Wilson | 71-76-75-73=295 | +3 | 2,500 |
| 3 | (United States) Kathy Whitworth | 76-78-69-73=296 | +4 | 1,500 |
| T4 | (United States) Sybil Griffin | 73-76-77-72=298 | +6 | 1,033 |
| T4 | (United States) Ruth Jessen | 73-72-75-78=298 | +6 | 1,033 |
| T4 | (United States) Jo Ann Prentice | 73-71-79-75=298 | +6 | 1,033 |
| 7 | (United States) Shirley Englehorn | 72-76-77-76=301 | +9 | 850 |
| T8 | (United States) Clifford Ann Creed | 76-76-75-75=302 | +10 | 718 |
| T8 | (United States) Murle Lindstrom | 74-79-74-75=302 | +10 | 718 |
| T8 | (United States) Mary Mills | 75-80-71-76=302 | +10 | 718 |
| T8 | (United States) Louise Suggs | 76-78-75-73=302 | +10 | 718 |
| T8 | (United States) Mickey Wright | 76-79-76-71=302 | +10 | 718 |
