= Hollywood Lakes Open =

Golf tournament

The Hollywood Lakes Open was a golf tournament on the LPGA Tour, played only in 1968. It was played at the Hollywood Lakes Country Club in Hollywood, Florida. Peggy Wilson won the event by one stroke over Carol Mann.
