= 1981 LPGA Championship =

Coordinates: 39.349°N 84.278°W

Tournament information
- Dates: June 11–14, 1981
- Location: Mason, Ohio
- Courses: Jack Nicklaus Golf Center; Grizzly Course
- Tour: LPGA Tour
- Format: Stroke play - 72 holes

Statistics
- Par: 72
- Length: 6,258 yards (5,722 m)
- Cut: 149 (+5)
- Prize fund: $150,000
- Winner's share: $22,500

Champion
- (United States) Donna Caponi
- 280 (−8)

Location in the United States
Location in Ohio

The 1981 LPGA Championship was the 27th LPGA Championship, played June 11–14 at Jack Nicklaus Golf Center at Kings Island in Mason, Ohio, a suburb northeast of Cincinnati.

Donna Caponi sank a fifteen-foot (4.5 m) birdie putt on the final green to win her second LPGA Championship, a stroke ahead of runners-up Jerilyn Britz and Pat Meyers. It was Caponi's fourth and final major title.

== Final leaderboard ==
Sunday, June 14, 1981

Place	Player	Score	To par	Money ($)
1	(United States) Donna Caponi	69-68-70-73=280	−8	22,500
T2	(United States) Jerilyn Britz	67-71-71-72=281	−7	12,600
T2	(United States) Pat Meyers	68-70-72-71=281	−7	12,600
4	(United States) Debbie Massey	72-72-69-70=283	−5	7,500
T5	(United States) JoAnne Carner	72-69-73-70=284	−4	5,350
T5	(United States) Beth Daniel	72-70-71-71=284	−4	5,350
T5	(United States) Nancy Lopez-Melton	70-72-72-70=284	−4	5,350
8	(South Africa) Sally Little	71-77-69-68=285	−3	4,350
9	(United States) Amy Alcott	69-70-73-74=286	−2	4,050
T10	(United States) Martha Nause	69-74-72-72=287	−1	3,600
T10	(United States) Sandra Palmer	73-70-72-72=287	−1	3,600
