= Vivian Brownlee =

American professional golfer (born c. 1947)

Personal information
- Nationality: United States
- Born: c. 1947 (age 78–79) Atlantic City, New Jersey, U.S.

Career
- Sport: Golf
- College: Pennsylvania State University
- Status: Professional
- Former tour: LPGA Tour (1975–1984)
- Professional wins: 1

Number of wins by tour
- LPGA Tour: 1

Best results in LPGA major championships
- Chevron Championship: T66: 1984
- Women's PGA C'ship: T15: 1980
- U.S. Women's Open: CUT: 1971-75, 1978-79, 1981
- du Maurier Classic: T28: 1980

Vivian Brownlee (born c. 1947) is an American professional golfer who played on the LPGA Tour.

== Career ==
Brownlee won once on the LPGA Tour in 1977.

== Professional wins (1) ==
=== LPGA Tour wins (1) ===
No.	Date	Tournament	Winning score	Margin of Victory	Runners-up
1	Oct, 2 1977	Dallas Civitan Open	+1 (75-69-73=217)	1 stroke	(United States) Sandra Palmer (United States) Mary Bea Porter (United States) Jo Ann Washam
