= 1979 LPGA Championship =

Coordinates: 39.349°N 84.278°W

Tournament information
- Dates: June 7–10, 1979
- Location: Mason, Ohio
- Course: Jack Nicklaus Golf Center
- Tour: LPGA Tour
- Format: Stroke play - 72 holes

Statistics
- Par: 72
- Length: 6,313 yards (5,773 m)
- Cut: 152 (+8)
- Prize fund: $150,000
- Winner's share: $22,500

Champion
- (United States) Donna Caponi Young
- 279 (−9)

Location in the United States
Location in Ohio

The 1979 LPGA Championship was the 25th LPGA Championship, played June 7–10 at Jack Nicklaus Golf Center at Kings Island in Mason, Ohio, a suburb northeast of Cincinnati.

Donna Caponi Young won the first of her two LPGA Championships, three strokes ahead of runner-up Jerilyn Britz. It was the third of her four major titles; her previous major win was nine years earlier.

== Final leaderboard ==
Sunday, June 10, 1979

Place	Player	Score	To par	Money ($)
1	(United States) Donna Caponi Young	69-70-70-70=279	−9	22,500
2	(United States) Jerilyn Britz	64-72-73-73=282	−6	14,700
3	(United States) Amy Alcott	69-72-69-74=284	−4	10,500
4	(South Africa) Sally Little	72-73-73-68=286	−2	7,500
5	(United States) Jo Ann Prentice	73-70-70-74=287	−1	6,000
T6	(United States) JoAnne Carner	69-70-72-77=288	E	4,612
T6	(United States) Peggy Conley	71-76-71-70=288	E	4,612
T6	(Australia) Penny Pulz	68-74-69-77=288	E	4,612
T6	(Australia) Jan Stephenson	73-72-68-75=288	E	4,612
T10	(United States) Laura Baugh	75-73-69-72=289	+1	3,300
T10	(United States) Pat Bradley	77-67-72-73=289	+1	3,300
T10	(United States) Nancy Lopez	73-71-69-76=289	+1	3,300
T10	(United States) Judy Rankin	72-71-70-76=289	+1	3,300
