= Child & Family Services Open =

Golf tournament formerly on the LPGA Tour

The Child & Family Services Open was a golf tournament on the LPGA Tour, played only in 1973. It was played at the Midlane Country Club in Wadsworth, Illinois. Betty Burfeindt won the event by three strokes over Debbie Austin and Laura Baugh.
