= Cameron Park Open =

Golf tournament formerly on the LPGA Tour

The Cameron Park Open was a golf tournament on the LPGA Tour, played only in 1973. It was played at the Cameron Park Country Club in Shingle Springs, California. Sandra Palmer won the event by two strokes over Susie Berning and Gail Denenberg.
