= Sharon Miller =

Sharon Miller may refer to:

- Sharon Miller (golfer)
- Sharon Miller (diplomat)

== See also ==
- Sharron Miller, American television and film director, producer, and screenwriter
