= Hale Baugh =

American modern pentathlete (1924–2011)

Personal information
- Born: September 10, 1924 Omaha, Nebraska, United States
- Died: November 16, 2011 (aged 87) Cocoa, Florida, United States

Sport
- Sport: Modern pentathlon

Hale Baugh (September 10, 1924 – November 16, 2011) was an American modern pentathlete. He competed at the 1948 Summer Olympics. He was the father of golfer Laura Baugh.
