= Jan Ferraris =

American professional golfer (born 1947)

Personal information
- Full name: Janis Jean Ferraris
- Nationality: United States
- Born: June 2, 1947 (age 79) San Francisco, California, U.S.
- Height: 5 ft 4 in (1.63 m)

Career
- Sport: Golf
- College: Odessa College
- Status: Professional
- Former tour: LPGA Tour (1966-1983)
- Professional wins: 3

Number of wins by tour
- LPGA Tour: 2
- LPGA of Japan Tour: 1

Best results in LPGA major championships
- Western Open: T11: 1967
- Titleholders C'ship: 23rd: 1966
- Chevron Championship: CUT: 1983
- Women's PGA C'ship: T14: 1975
- U.S. Women's Open: T18: 1966
- du Maurier Classic: T28: 1980

Achievements and awards
- LPGA Rookie of the Year: 1966

Janis Jean Ferraris (born June 2, 1947) is an American professional golfer. She played on the LPGA Tour.

== Career ==
Ferraris won the 1963 U.S. Girls' Junior and the Women's Western Junior in 1963 and 1964. She was LPGA Rookie of the Year in 1966.

Ferraris won twice on the LPGA Tour, in 1971 and 1972.

== Awards and honors ==
In 1966, she earned LPGA Rookie of the Year honors.

== Amateur wins ==
- 1963 U.S. Girls' Junior, Women's Western Junior
- 1964 Women's Western Junior

== Professional wins (3) ==
=== LPGA Tour wins (2) ===
No.	Date	Tournament	Winning score	Margin of victory	Runner(s)-up
1	Mar 21, 1971	Orange Blossom Classic	+2 (72-72-74=218)	1 stroke	(United States) Sandra Haynie (United States) Betsy Rawls
2	Jul 30, 1972	Lady Pepsi Open	+5 (72-74-75=221)	1 stroke	(United States) Betty Burfeindt

LPGA Tour playoff record (0–1)

No.	Year	Tournament	Opponent	Result
1	1969	Tournament of Champs	(United States) Carol Mann	Lost to par on first extra hole

=== LPGA of Japan Tour wins (1) ===
- 1973 LPGA Japan Classic
