= Tournament of Champs =

Golf tournament formerly on the LPGA Tour

The Tournament of Champs was a golf tournament on the LPGA Tour, played only in 1969. It was played at the Glendale Golf & Country Club in Winnipeg, Manitoba, Canada. Carol Mann won the event in a sudden-death playoff with Jan Ferraris.
