= WUI Classic =

Golf tournament formerly on the LPGA Tour

Tournament information
- Location: Jericho, New York
- Established: 1977
- Course: Meadow Brook Club
- Par: 72
- Length: 6,347 yards (5,804 m)
- Tour: LPGA Tour
- Format: Stroke play - 72 holes
- Prize fund: $125,000
- Month played: July – August
- Final year: 1982

Tournament record score
- Aggregate: 276 Beth Daniel (1982)
- To par: –12 Beth Daniel (1982)

Final champion
- (United States) Beth Daniel

The WUI Classic was a golf tournament on the LPGA Tour for six seasons, from 1977 to 1982. It was played at three different courses on Long Island, New York. The last four were played at Meadow Brook Club in Jericho.

The tournament sponsor was Western Union International.

Hall of famer Judy Rankin successfully defended her title in 1979 for her 26th and final tour win.

== Tournament locations ==
| Years | Venue | Location |
|---|---|---|
| 1977 | Colonie Hill Country Club | Hauppauge, New York |
| 1978 | North Hills Country Club | Manhasset, New York |
| 1979–82 | Meadow Brook Club | Jericho, New York |

== Winners ==
WUI Classic

- 1982 Beth Daniel
- 1981 Donna Caponi
- 1980 Sally Little
- 1979 Judy Rankin (2)
- 1978 Judy Rankin

Long Island Charity Classic

- 1977 Debbie Austin
