= Sandra Spuzich =

American professional golfer (1937–2015)

Personal information
- Nationality: United States
- Born: April 3, 1937 Indianapolis, Indiana, U.S.
- Died: October 6, 2015 (aged 78) Indianapolis, Indiana, U.S.
- Spouse: Joyce Kazmierski

Career
- Sport: Golf
- College: Indiana University
- Turned professional: 1962
- Former tour: LPGA Tour (1962–92)
- Professional wins: 8

Number of wins by tour
- LPGA Tour: 7
- Other: 1

Best results in LPGA major championships (wins: 1)
- Western Open: T15: 1966
- Titleholders C'ship: 9th: 1966
- Chevron Championship: T23: 1983
- Women's PGA C'ship: 4th: 1968
- U.S. Women's Open: Won: 1966
- du Maurier Classic: T10: 1983

Sandra Spuzich (April 3, 1937 – October 6, 2015) was an American professional golfer who played on the LPGA Tour in the 1960s, 1970s and 1980s.

== Early life and amateur career ==
Spuzich was born in Indianapolis, Indiana to a father of Polish, Serbian and Macedonian descent and a Lebanese mother. She was an amateur golfer and elementary school teacher early in her career.

== Professional career ==
In 1962, she turned professional. Her first win came at the 1966 U.S. Women's Open by one stroke over Carol Mann and two strokes over Mickey Wright. The tournament was held at Hazeltine National Golf Club in Chaska, Minnesota – the first major championship played there.

In 1982 at the age of 45, Spuzich became the oldest player to win two LPGA Tour events in the same year when she won the Corning Classic followed by the Mary Kay Classic.

== Personal life ==
Spuzich died in Indianapolis on October 6, 2015. Her life partner was fellow LPGA golfer Joyce Kazmierski. Kazmierski and Spuzich were married on August 22, 2015.

== Professional wins (8) ==
=== LPGA Tour wins (7) ===
Legend
LPGA Tour major championships (1)
Other LPGA Tour (6)

No.	Date	Tournament	Winning score	Margin of victory	Runner(s)-up
1	Jul 3, 1966	U.S. Women's Open	+9 (75-74-76-72=297)	1 stroke	(United States) Carol Mann
2	Aug 3, 1969	Buckeye Savings Invitational	+3 (71-72-70=213)	3 strokes	(United States) Judy Rankin
3	May 5, 1974	Lady Tara Classic	E (71-76-72=219)	Playoff	(United States) Donna Caponi (United States) Kathy Whitworth
4	May 29, 1977	Lady Keystone Open	−9 (68-66-67=201)	1 stroke	(Argentina) Silvia Bertolaccini
5	Sep 7, 1980	Barth Classic	−4 (73-70-69=212)	2 strokes	(United States) Carolyn Hill (United States) Lori Garbacz
6	May 30, 1982	Corning Classic	−8 (69-72-70-69=280)	Playoff	(United States) Patty Sheehan
7	Sep 12, 1982	Mary Kay Classic	−10 (70-69-67=206)	1 stroke	(Switzerland) Carole Charbonnier

LPGA Tour playoff record (2–2)

No.	Year	Tournament	Opponent(s)	Result
1	1968	Corpus Christi Civitan Open	(United States) Judy Rankin	Lost to par on second extra hole
2	1974	Lady Tara Classic	(United States) Donna Caponi (United States) Kathy Whitworth	Won with par on fifth extra hole Whitworth eliminated by par on third hole
3	1974	Bluegrass Invitational	(United States) JoAnne Carner	Lost to bogey on first extra hole
4	1982	Corning Classic	(United States) Patty Sheehan	Won with par on first extra hole

=== Other wins (1) ===
- 1966 Haig & Haig Scotch Foursome (with Jack Rule, Jr.)

== Major championships ==
=== Wins (1) ===
Year	Championship	Winning score	Margin	Runner-up
1966	U.S. Women's Open	+9 (75-74-76-72=297)	1 stroke	(United States) Carol Mann
