= 1963 U.S. Women's Open =

Coordinates: 39.183°N 84.387°W

Tournament information
- Dates: July 18–20, 1963
- Location: Cincinnati, Ohio
- Course: Kenwood Country Club
- Organized by: USGA
- Tour: LPGA Tour
- Format: Stroke play – 72 holes

Statistics
- Par: 73
- Length: 6,444 yards (5,892 m)
- Field: 40 after cut
- Cut: 159 (+13)
- Prize fund: $9,000
- Winner's share: $2,000

Champion
- (United States) Mary Mills
- 301 (−3)

Location in the United States
Location in Ohio

The 1963 U.S. Women's Open was the 18th U.S. Women's Open, held July 18–20 at Kenwood Country Club, northeast of Cincinnati, Ohio.

Mary Mills, age 23, won her only U.S. Women's Open title, three strokes ahead of runners-up Louise Suggs and Sandra Haynie. It was the first of nine victories on the LPGA Tour for Mills and the first of her three major titles.

Retired tennis pro Althea Gibson, age 35, became the first African American to play in a U.S. Women's Open. She shot 78 and 82 for 160 (+14) and missed the cut by a stroke. Three-time champion Mickey Wright did not play, opting for dental work, which she had originally planned to have done the previous week. Wright returned in 1964 to win her fourth title. Defending champion Murle Lindstrom tied for seventh.

The championship was played the same week as the PGA Championship, which concluded on Sunday.

== Final leaderboard ==
Saturday, July 20, 1963

| Place | Player | Score | To par | Money ($) |
|---|---|---|---|---|
| 1 | (United States) Mary Mills | 71-70-75-73=289 | −3 | 2,000 |
| T2 | (United States) Louise Suggs | 72-72-75-73=292 | E | 1,000 |
| T2 | (United States) Sandra Haynie | 75-72-73-72=292 | E | 1,000 |
| 4 | (United States) Clifford Ann Creed | 71-75-78-74=298 | +6 | 650 |
| T5 | (United States) Kathy Whitworth | 75-74-80-73=302 | +10 | 450 |
| T5 | (United States) Ruth Jessen | 72-78-77-75=302 | +10 | 450 |
| T7 | (United States) Kathy Cornelius | 76-75-77-75=303 | +11 | 313 |
| T7 | (United States) Mary Lena Faulk | 75-73-76-79=303 | +11 | 313 |
| T7 | (United States) Murle Lindstrom | 83-75-74-71=303 | +11 | 313 |
| T7 | (United States) Patsy Hahn | 74-73-78-78=303 | +11 | 313 |
