= Mary Lou Crocker =

American professional golfer (1944–2016)

Personal information
- Full name: Mary Lou Daniel Crocker
- Nationality: United States
- Born: September 17, 1944 Louisville, Kentucky, U.S.
- Died: January 27, 2016 (aged 71) Bartonville, Texas, U.S.
- Height: 5 ft 3 in (1.60 m)

Career
- Sport: Golf
- College: University of Kentucky
- Turned professional: 1965
- Former tour: LPGA Tour (1966–1980)
- Professional wins: 1

Number of wins by tour
- LPGA Tour: 1

Best results in LPGA major championships
- Western Open: 39th: 1967
- Titleholders C'ship: 31st: 1966
- Women's PGA C'ship: T20: 1968
- U.S. Women's Open: T9: 1973
- du Maurier Classic: DNP

Mary Lou Daniel Crocker (September 17, 1944 – January 27, 2016) was an American professional golfer who played on the LPGA Tour. She also played under her maiden name, Mary Lou Daniel.

== Career ==
In 1962, Daniel won the U.S. Girls' Junior. In 1962, she was named Kentucky Female Amateur Athlete-of-the-Year.

Crocker was the first woman to attend the University of Kentucky on a men's scholarship.

Crocker won once on the LPGA Tour in 1973.

== Awards and honors ==
In 1962, Crocker was named Kentucky Female Amateur Athlete-of-the-Year.

== Amateur wins (2) ==
- 1962 U.S. Girls' Junior, Western Girls' Junior

== Professional wins (1) ==
=== LPGA Tour wins (1) ===
No.	Date	Tournament	Winning score	Margin of victory	Runner-up
1	Jul 8, 1973	MARC Equity Classic	−9 (70-72-68=210)	4 strokes	(United States) Jane Blalock

LPGA Tour playoff record (0–1)

No.	Year	Tournament	Opponents	Result
1	1976	Jerry Lewis Muscular Dystrophy Classic	(United States) JoAnne Carner (United States) Sandra Palmer (England) Michelle Walker	Palmer won with birdie on third extra hole Crocker and Walker eliminated by par on first hole
