= AreaWEB.COM Challenge =

Golf tournament formerly on the LPGA Tour

The areaWEB.COM Challenge was a golf tournament on the LPGA Tour played in August 1999 at Pleasant Valley Country Club in Sutton, Massachusetts. Mardi Lunn won the tournament by one stroke over Jan Stephenson.
