= 1983 Peter Jackson Classic =

Coordinates: 45.444039°N 73.830811°W

The 1983 Peter Jackson Classic was contested from June 30 to July 3 at Beaconsfield Golf Club. It was the 11th edition of the Peter Jackson Classic, and the fifth edition as a major championship on the LPGA Tour.

This event was won by Hollis Stacy.

== Final leaderboard ==
Place	Player	Score	To par	Money (US$)
1	(United States) Hollis Stacy	68-68-73-68=277	−11	37,500
T2	(United States) JoAnne Carner	71-69-73-66=279	−9	21,000
T2	(United States) Alice Miller	71-75-67-66=279	−9	21,000
4	(United States) Rosie Jones	69-71-71-70=281	−7	12,500
T5	(United States) Pat Bradley	67-74-70-71=282	−6	8,500
T5	(United States) Sandra Haynie	71-73-69-69=282	−6	8,500
T5	(United States) Patty Sheehan	69-70-72-71=282	−6	8,500
T5	(Australia) Jan Stephenson	68-71-70-73=282	−6	8,500
9	(United States) Donna White	68-68-73-74=283	−5	6,750
T10	(Japan) Ayako Okamoto	69-78-66-71=284	−4	5,750
T10	(United States) Sandra Spuzich	70-66-73-75=284	−4	5,750
T10	(United States) Vicki Tabor	69-72-71-72=284	−4	5,750
