= 1966 LPGA Championship =

Coordinates: 36.128°N 115.125°W

Tournament information
- Dates: September 22–25, 1966
- Location: Las Vegas, Nevada
- Course: Stardust Country Club
- Tour: LPGA Tour
- Format: Stroke play – 72 holes

Statistics
- Par: 71
- Cut: none
- Prize fund: $17,500
- Winner's share: $2,475

Champion
- (United States) Gloria Ehret
- 282 (−2)

Location in the United States
Location in Nevada

The 1966 LPGA Championship was the twelfth LPGA Championship, held September 22–25 at Stardust Country Club in Las Vegas, Nevada.

Gloria Ehret won her only major title, three strokes ahead of runner-up Mickey Wright, a four-time winner of the championship. Defending champion Sandra Haynie finished nine strokes back in seventh place.

It was the last of six consecutive LPGA Championships at Stardust, which opened five years earlier. After several ownership and name changes, it became Las Vegas National Golf Club in 1998.

== Final leaderboard ==
Sunday, September 25, 1966

Place	Player	Score	To par	Money ($)
1	(United States) Gloria Ehret	70-70-67-75=282	−2	2,475
2	(United States) Mickey Wright	69-68-71-77=285	+1	1,900
T3	(United States) Judy Kimball	72-70-72-75=289	+5	1,390
T3	(United States) Mary Mills	72-73-70-74=289	+5	1,390
T5	(United States) Clifford Ann Creed	72-74-73-71=290	+6	958
T5	(United States) Marilynn Smith	74-72-71-73=290	+6	958
7	(United States) Sandra Haynie	76-70-75-70=291	+7	735
8	(United States) Louise Suggs	70-69-75-78=292	+8	635
9	(United States) Murle Lindstrom	72-72-75-75=294	+10	570
T10	(United States) Betsy Cullen	74-73-70-78=295	+11	463
T10	(United States) Betsy Rawls	71-73-74-77=295	+11	463
T10	(United States) Kathy Whitworth	71-78-73-73=295	+11	463
