= Willow Park Ladies Invitational =

Women's golf tournament

The Willow Park Ladies Invitational was a golf tournament on the LPGA Tour, played only in 1968. It was played at the Willow Park Country Club in Calgary, Alberta, Canada. Carol Mann won the event by nine strokes over four other golfers.
