= 1964 Women's Western Open =

Golf tournament

Coordinates: 30.5397°N 87.2315°W

Tournament information
- Dates: March 19–22, 1964
- Location: Pensacola, Florida
- Course: Scenic Hills Country Club
- Tour: LPGA Tour
- Format: 72 holes, stroke play

Statistics
- Par: 75
- Length: 6,543 yards (5,983 m)
- Field: 90 players, 32 after cut
- Cut: 173 (+23)
- Prize fund: $8,000
- Winner's share: $1,200

Champion
- Carol Mann
- 308 (+8)
- Location within the United States Location within Florida

The 1964 Women's Western Open was a golf tournament contested from March 19–22 at Scenic Hills Country Club in Pensacola, Florida. It was the 35th edition of the Women's Western Open.

This event was won by Carol Mann.

== Final leaderboard ==
Place	Player	Score	To par	Money ($)
1	(United States) Carol Mann	83-75-76-74=308	+8	1,200
T2	(United States) Ruth Jessen	73-83-82-72=310	+10	850
T2	(United States) Judy Kimball	77-79-80-74=310	+10	850
T4	(United States) Clifford Ann Creed	76-81-75-79=311	+11	560
T4	(United States) Judy Torluemke	77-82-78-74=311	+11	560
6	(United States) Barbara McIntire (a)	80-79-75-78=312	+12	0
7	(United States) Kathy Whitworth	77-77-80-79=313	+13	450
8	(United States) Kathy Cornelius	79-81-76-79=314	+14	380
T9	(United States) Mary Lena Faulk	78-77-71-79=315	+15	272
T9	(United States) Betsy Rawls	78-76-78-83=315	+15	272
T9	(United States) Barbara Romack	80-78-78-79=315	+15	272
T9	(United States) Louise Suggs	80-77-74-84=315	+15	272
