= Pleasant Valley Country Club =

Country club in Sutton, Massachusetts

- Location in the United States Location in Massachusetts.
- 42.151°N 71.737°W

Club information
- Location: 95 Armsby Road; Sutton, Massachusetts, U.S.
- Established: 1961; 65 years ago
- Type: Private
- Owner: Jay Magill, Beth Shropshire
- Tota holes: 18
- Tournaments: Lady Carling Eastern Open; Massachusetts Open; Carling World Open; LPGA Championship; Kemper Open; New England Classic; Massachusetts Amateur; areaWEB.COM Challenge
- Greens: Bent grass
- Fairways: Bent grass
- Website: www.pleasantvalleycc.com
- Par: 72
- Length: 7,020 yards (6,419 m)
- Course rating: 74.3
- Slope rating: 139

Pleasant Valley Country Club is a golf course and country club in the northeastern United States, located in Sutton, Massachusetts. The course is a 72 par that measures 7,020 yards (6,419 m).

== History ==
In 1959, a 350-acre (1.4 km^{2}) apple orchard was carved out to build Pleasant Valley Country Club. Cosmo Mingolla oversaw the opening of the club two years later in 1961. In 1979, Pleasant Valley was handed over to Edward Mingolla. In 2010, John Magill purchased the club in a foreclosure from the Bank of New England. Two years later, Magill died and ownership was given to his children: Jay Magill and Beth Shropshire. In 2019, they listed the club for sale, but later took it off the market.

Since 1962, Pleasant Valley has hosted many important professional golf tournaments of the Professional Golfers' Association of America (PGA). That year marked its first professional tournament, the LPGA Lady Carling Eastern Open, which was won by Shirley Englehorn. Two years later, the first men's tournament took place called the Massachusetts Open, won by Bill Ezinicki.

It hosted its first PGA Tour event in 1965, the Carling World Open, won by Tony Lema, two strokes ahead of Arnold Palmer. Three years later, the legendary Palmer won the inaugural edition of the Kemper Open. In 1969, Pleasant Valley created its own PGA Tour event, the New England Classic, which it exclusively hosted through 1998, when it ceased.

Pleasant Valley hosted seven women's majors, all LPGA Championships (1967–68, 1970–74), while Paul Harney was the head club pro from 1965 to 1973. The one-time LPGA Patty Berg Classic took place in 1969, won by Kathy Whitworth.

In 1974, the course hosted the Massachusetts State Amateur Championship, won by Bill Mallon. The one-time LPGA AreaWEB.COM Challenge took place in 1999 and was won by Mardi Lunn. In 2004, Pleasant Valley hosted the Massachusetts Open for the first time since 1964; Geoffrey Sisk won the tournament.

== List of tournaments ==
- 1962–1966: Lady Carling Eastern Open (LPGA Tour)
- 1964, 2004: Massachusetts Open
- 1965: Carling World Open (PGA Tour)
- 1967–1968, 1970–1974: LPGA Championship (LPGA Tour major)
- 1968: Kemper Open (PGA Tour)
- 1969: Patty Berg Classic (LPGA Tour)
- 1969–1998: New England Classic (PGA Tour)
- 1974: Massachusetts State Amateur Championship
- 1999: AreaWEB.COM Challenge (LPGA Tour)
