= Betty Burfeindt =

American professional golfer (born 1945)

Personal information
- Nationality: United States
- Born: July 20, 1945 (age 81) New York City, New York, U.S.
- Height: 5 ft 4 in (1.63 m)

Career
- Sport: Golf
- College: Cortland State University
- Turned professional: 1969
- Former tour: LPGA Tour (1969-1981)
- Professional wins: 4

Number of wins by tour
- LPGA Tour: 4

Best results in LPGA major championships (wins: 1)
- Titleholders C'ship: DNP
- Chevron Championship: T50: 1986
- Women's PGA C'ship: Won: 1976
- U.S. Women's Open: 5th: 1972
- du Maurier Classic: CUT: 1979, 1980

Betty Burfeindt (born July 20, 1945) is an American professional golfer. She played on the LPGA Tour.

== Career ==
In 1945, Burfeindt was born in New York City, New York. She attended Cortland State University in New York. Her rookie season on tour was in 1969. Although just 5 ft 4 in (1.63 m) in height, she was one of the longest hitters on the LPGA Tour in the 1970s.

Burfeindt won four times on tour, and her last was her only major championship, the LPGA Championship in 1976, in which she finished one stroke ahead of runner-up Judy Rankin. Her two best years were 1972 and 1973 with consecutive fourth-place finishes on the money list. Burfeindt's last season on tour was 1981.

== Professional wins (4) ==
=== LPGA Tour wins (4) ===
Legend
LPGA Tour major championships (1)
Other LPGA Tour (3)

No.	Date	Tournament	Winning score	To par	Margin of victory	Runner(s)-up
1	Apr 23, 1972	Birmingham Centennial Classic	71-70-71=212	−4	2 strokes	(United States) Murle Breer
2	May 7, 1972	Sealy LPGA Classic	67-70-76-69=282	−10	4 strokes	(United States) Kathy Ahern
3	Aug 12, 1973	Child & Family Services Open	74-70-68=212	−7	3 strokes	(United States) Debbie Austin (United States) Laura Baugh
4	May 30, 1976	LPGA Championship	71-72-73-71=287	−5	1 stroke	(United States) Judy Rankin

LPGA Tour playoff record (0–2)

No.	Year	Tournament	Opponent(s)	Result
1	1973	Pompano Beach Classic	(United States) Sandra Palmer	Lost to birdie on first extra hole
2	1973	Birmingham Classic	(United States) Clifford Ann Creed (United States) Gloria Ehret	Ehret won with birdie on first extra hole

== Major championship ==
=== Wins (1) ===
Year	Championship	54 holes	Winning score	To par	Margin	Runner-up
1976	LPGA Championship	1 stroke lead	71-72-73-71=287	−5	1 stroke	(United States) Judy Rankin
