= 1977 U.S. Women's Open =

Coordinates: 44.834°N 93.591°W

Tournament information
- Dates: July 21–24, 1977
- Location: Chaska, Minnesota
- Course: Hazeltine National Golf Club
- Organized by: USGA
- Tour: LPGA Tour

Statistics
- Par: 72
- Length: 6,313 yards (5,773 m)
- Field: 151 players, 52 after cut
- Cut: 157 (+13)
- Prize fund: $75,000
- Winner's share: $11,040

Champion
- (United States) Hollis Stacy
- 292 (+4)

Location in the United States
Location in Minnesota

The 1977 U.S. Women's Open was the 32nd U.S. Women's Open, held July 21–24 at Hazeltine National Golf Club in Chaska, Minnesota, a suburb southwest of Minneapolis.

Hollis Stacy led wire-to-wire and won her first major championship and the first of her three U.S. Women's Open titles, two strokes ahead of runner-up Nancy Lopez, who had recently turned professional. She began the final round with a one-stroke lead over Jan Stephenson, with Lopez a stroke back in third.

Seven years earlier in 1970, Hazeltine had hosted the U.S. Open, which returned in 1991. The PGA Championship was played at the course in 2002 and 2009 and the Ryder Cup in 2016.

== Final leaderboard ==
Sunday, July 24, 1977

Place	Player	Score	To par	Money ($)
1	(United States) Hollis Stacy	70-73-75-74=292	+4	11,040
2	(United States) Nancy Lopez	73-72-75-74=294	+6	7,040
3	(United States) JoAnne Carner	74-72-76-73=295	+7	4,540
T4	(United States) Amy Alcott	72-77-75-74=298	+10	2,923
T4	(Australia) Jan Stephenson	72-75-72-79=298	+10	2,923
T4	(United States) Pat Bradley	77-72-79-70=298	+10	2,923
7	(United States) Susie McAllister	76-80-73-70=299	+11	2,340
8	(United States) Donna Caponi Young	76-77-77-70=300	+12	2,140
9	(United States) Jane Blalock	72-78-77-74=301	+13	2,040
T10	(United States) Jo Ann Prentice	77-76-77-72=302	+14	1,790
T10	(United States) Judy Rankin	75-77-78-72=302	+14	1,790
T10	(United States) Kathy Whitworth	74-76-79-73=302	+14	1,790
T10	(South Africa) Sally Little	81-75-72-74=302	+14	1,790
