= Peggy Wilson (golfer) =

American professional golfer

Personal information
- Full name: Margaret Joyce Wilson
- Nickname: Peggy
- Nationality: United States
- Born: December 28, 1934 (age 91) Lauderdale, Mississippi, U.S.
- Height: 5 ft 5 in (1.65 m)

Career
- Sport: Golf
- College: Mississippi State College for Women
- Status: Professional
- Former tour: LPGA Tour (1962-1978)
- Professional wins: 1

Number of wins by tour
- LPGA Tour: 1

Best results in LPGA major championships
- Titleholders C'ship: 2nd: 1965
- Women's PGA C'ship: T12: 1968
- U.S. Women's Open: 2nd: 1969

Margaret Joyce "Peggy" Wilson (born December 28, 1934) is an American professional golfer who played on the LPGA Tour.

== Career ==
Wilson won once on the LPGA Tour in 1968.

== Professional wins (1) ==
=== LPGA Tour wins (1) ===
| No. | Date | Tournament | Winning score | Margin of victory | Runner-up |
|---|---|---|---|---|---|
| 1 | Dec 1, 1968 | Hollywood Lakes Open | −7 (69-70-70=209) | 1 stroke | (United States) Carol Mann |

LPGA Tour playoff record (0–1)

| No. | Year | Tournament | Opponents | Result |
|---|---|---|---|---|
| 1 | 1969 | St. Louis Women's Invitational | (United States) Sandra Haynie (United States) Kathy Whitworth | Haynie won with par on third extra hole Whitworth eliminated by birdie on first hole |
