= Pocono Northeast Classic =

1977 golf tournament

The Pocono Northeast Classic was a golf tournament on the LPGA Tour, played only in 1977. It was played at the Pocono Manor Golf Course in Pocono Manor, Pennsylvania. Debbie Austin won the tournament by one stroke over Sandra Post.
