= Cubic Corporation Classic =

Golf tournament in 1974

The Cubic Corporation Classic was a golf tournament on the LPGA Tour, played only in 1974. It was played at the Stardust Country Club in San Diego, California. Sandra Palmer won the event by one stroke over Kathy McMullen.
