= Glass City Classic =

Golf tournament

The Glass City Classic was a golf tournament on the LPGA Tour, played only in 1966. It was played at the Highland Meadows Golf Club in Sylvania, Ohio. Sandra Haynie won the event in a sudden-death playoff over Gloria Ehret.

== See also ==
- Jamie Farr Toledo Classic: a LPGA Tour event that has been played at Highland Meadows Golf Club since 1989.
