= Sacramento Union Ladies Classic =

Golf tournament formerly on the LPGA Tour

The Sacramento Union Ladies Classic was a golf tournament on the LPGA Tour, played only in 1974. It was played at the Cameron Park Country Club in Sacramento, California. Carole Jo Kabler won the event by four strokes over Jane Blalock and Catherine Duggan.
