= Heritage Village Open =

Golf tournament

The Heritage Village Open was a golf tournament on the LPGA Tour from 1971 to 1973. It was played at the Heritage Village Country Club in Southbury, Connecticut.

== Winners ==
Heritage Village Open

- 1973 Susie Berning
- 1972 Judy Rankin

Heritage Open

- 1971 Sandra Palmer
