= 1964 LPGA Championship =

Coordinates: 36.128°N 115.125°W

Tournament information
- Dates: October 1–4, 1964
- Location: Las Vegas, Nevada
- Course: Stardust Country Club
- Tour: LPGA Tour
- Format: Stroke play – 72 holes

Statistics
- Par: 71
- Field: 47 players
- Cut: none
- Prize fund: $16,500
- Winner's share: $2,450

Champion
- (United States) Mary Mills
- 278 (−6)

Location in the United States
Location in Nevada

The 1964 LPGA Championship was the tenth LPGA Championship, held October 1–4 at Stardust Country Club in Las Vegas, Nevada.

Mary Mills shot a final round 69 (−2) to win the first of her two LPGA Championships, two strokes ahead runner-up Mickey Wright, the defending champion and 54-hole leader. The total of 278 set a record for the championship which stood until 1978; it was the second of three career majors for Mills.

It was the fourth of six consecutive LPGA Championships at Stardust, which opened three years earlier. After several ownership and name changes, it became Las Vegas National Golf Club in 1998.

== Final leaderboard ==
Sunday, October 4, 1964

Place	Player	Score	To par	Money ($)
1	(United States) Mary Mills	68-69-72-69=278	−6	2,450
2	(United States) Mickey Wright	72-68-67-73=280	−4	1,900
T3	(United States) Jo Ann Prentice	71-68-71-71=281	−3	1,350
T3	(United States) Kathy Whitworth	73-69-70-69=281	−3	1,350
T5	(United States) Sandra Haynie	69-69-71-73=282	−2	960
T5	(United States) Betsy Rawls	73-71-70-68=282	−2	960
7	(United States) Ruth Jessen	71-69-73-70=283	−1	760
T8	(United States) Shirley Englehorn	71-72-71-70=284	E	615
T8	(United States) Marlene Hagge	67-74-69-74=284	E	615
10	(United States) Clifford Ann Creed	74-74-70-69=287	+3	520
