= Corpus Christi Civitan Open =

Golf tournament

Tournament information
- Location: Corpus Christi, Texas
- Established: 1967
- Course(s): Pharaoh's CC (1967-1972); Corpus Christi CC (1973)
- Tour: LPGA Tour
- Format: Stroke play
- Final year: 1973

Final champion
- Sharon Miller

The Corpus Christi Civitan Open was a golf tournament on the LPGA Tour from 1967 to 1973. It was played in Corpus Christi, Texas at the Pharaoh's Country Club from 1967 to 1972 and at the Corpus Christi Country Club in 1973.

The 1968 Corpus Christi Civitan Open was the site of future World Golf Hall of Fame Judy Rankin's first LPGA Tour win. She defeated Sandra Spuzich in a playoff.

At the 1972 Corpus Christi Civitan Open, it took ten holes of sudden death for Jo Ann Prentice to defeat Kathy Whitworth and Sandra Palmer. To this date it remains the longest sudden death playoff in LPGA history.

== Winners ==
- 1973 Sharon Miller
- 1972 Jo Ann Prentice
- 1970-71 No tournament
- 1969 Carol Mann
- 1968 Judy Rankin
- 1967 Clifford Ann Creed
