= Carole Jo Kabler =

American professional golfer (1938–2017)

Personal information
- Nationality: United States
- Born: June 13, 1938 Eugene, Oregon, U.S.
- Died: March 16, 2017 (aged 78) Sacramento, California, U.S.

Career
- Sport: Golf
- College: University of Oregon; Portland State
- Turned professional: 1970
- Former tour: LPGA Tour
- Professional wins: 4

Number of wins by tour
- LPGA Tour: 4

Best results in LPGA major championships
- Western Open: DNP
- Titleholders C'ship: DNP
- Chevron Championship: T52: 1984
- Women's PGA C'ship: 3rd: 1976
- U.S. Women's Open: T7: 1982
- du Maurier Classic: CUT: 1982

Carole Jo Kabler (June 13, 1938 – March 16, 2017) was an American professional golfer who played on the LPGA Tour. She also competed under her married names: Carole Jo Skala, Carole Jo Callison, and Carole Jo Whitted.

Kabler was born in Eugene, Oregon. She had an outstanding amateur career, winning the Oregon Girls' Junior twice (1954, 1955) and the Oregon Women's Open four times (1955, 1961, 1962, 1965), along with several other wins. In 1955 she won the U.S. Girls' Junior and in 1957 was a semi-finalist in the U.S. Women's Amateur.

Skala turned professional in 1970. She won four times on the LPGA Tour (competing as Carole Jo Skala) between 1973 and 1974.

Kabler married Michael Skala in 1958. They divorced in 1980. In 1981, she married Verne Callison (1918–1993), a two-time winner of the U.S. Amateur Public Links. In 1995, she married John Whitted, Jr. She was inducted into the Pacific Northwest Golf Association's Hall of Fame in 2009.

== Professional wins ==
=== LPGA Tour wins (4) ===
No.	Date	Tournament	Winning score	Margin of victory	Runner(s)-up
1	Jul 15, 1973	George Washington Classic	−5 (76-68-70=214)	1 stroke	(United States) Sandra Haynie (United States) Kathy McMullen
2	Jun 30, 1974	Peter Jackson Ladies Classic	−11 (68-71-69=208)	3 strokes	(United States) JoAnne Carner
3	Jul 28, 1974	Wheeling Ladies Classic	−4 (69-70-73=212)	4 strokes	(United States) Jane Blalock
4	Oct 6, 1974	Sacramento Union Ladies Classic	−6 (73-71-69=213)	4 strokes	(United States) Jane Blalock (United States) Cathy Duggan

Note: Kabler won the Peter Jackson Ladies Classic (which became the du Maurier Classic) before it became a major championship.

LPGA Tour playoff record (0–1)

No.	Year	Tournament	Opponent	Result
1	1982	American Express Sun City Classic	(United States) Beth Daniel	Lost to birdie on second extra hole
