= Bing Crosby International Classic =

Golf tournament on the LPGA Tour

The Bing Crosby International Classic was a golf tournament on the LPGA Tour from 1974 to 1975. It was played at the San Isidro Country Club in Guadalajara, Mexico.

== Winners ==
- 1975 Sue Roberts
- 1974 Jane Blalock
