= Sue Roberts (golfer) =

American professional golfer (born 1948)

Personal information
- Nationality: United States
- Born: June 22, 1948 (age 78) Oak Park, Illinois, U.S.
- Height: 5 ft 6 in (1.68 m)

Career
- Sport: Golf
- Turned professional: 1969
- Former tour: LPGA Tour (1969-1983)
- Professional wins: 4

Number of wins by tour
- LPGA Tour: 4

Best results in LPGA major championships
- Chevron Championship: T62: 1983
- Women's PGA C'ship: T6: 1974
- U.S. Women's Open: T9: 1973
- du Maurier Classic: T49: 1979

Sue Roberts (born June 22, 1948) is an American professional golfer who played on the LPGA Tour.

== Career ==
Roberts won four times on the LPGA Tour between 1974 and 1976.

== Professional wins (4) ==
=== LPGA Tour wins (4) ===
No.	Date	Tournament	Winning score	Margin of victory	Runner(s)-up
1	July 7, 1974	Niagara Frontier Classic	–6 (74-69-70=213)	2 strokes	(United States) JoAnne Carner
2	Sep 2, 1974	Southgate Ladies Open	–2 (70-72=142)	Tie^{1}	(United States) Jane Blalock
3	Mar 23, 1975	Bing Crosby International Classic	–2 (68-74-72=214)	3 strokes	(United States) Jane Blalock
4	May 16, 1976	American Defender Classic	–5 (69-72-70=211)	1 stroke	(United States) JoAnne Carner (United States) Carole Jo Kabler (United States) Hollis Stacy (United States) Kathy Whitworth

^{1}The 1974 Southgate Ladies Open was shortened to 36 holes due to inclement weather. Since a playoff was not possible, Roberts and Jane Blalock were declared co-champions.
