= Pompano Beach Classic =

Golf tournament formerly on the LPGA Tour

The Pompano Beach Classic was a golf tournament on the LPGA Tour, played only in 1973. It was played at the Pompano Beach Country Club in Pompano Beach, Florida. Sandra Palmer won the event on the first hole of a sudden-death playoff with Betty Burfeindt.
