= Houston Exchange Clubs Classic =

Golf tournament formerly on the LPGA Tour

The Houston Exchange Clubs Classic was a golf tournament on the LPGA Tour from 1977 to 1978. It was played at the Newport Yacht & Country Club (now Newport Country Club) in Crosby, Texas.

== Winners ==
- 1978 Donna Caponi
- 1977 Amy Alcott
