= Debbie Austin =

American professional golfer (born 1948)

Personal information
- Nationality: United States
- Born: February 1, 1948 (age 78) Oneida, New York, U.S.
- Height: 5 ft 4 in (1.63 m)

Career
- Sport: Golf
- College: Rollins College
- Status: Professional
- Former tour: LPGA Tour (1968–1987)
- Professional wins: 8

Number of wins by tour
- LPGA Tour: 7
- Other: 1

Best results in LPGA major championships
- Titleholders C'ship: T17: 1972
- Chevron Championship: T38: 1984
- Women's PGA C'ship: 7th: 1973
- U.S. Women's Open: 8th: 1975
- du Maurier Classic: T17: 1981

Debbie Austin (born February 1, 1948) is an American professional golfer. She played on the LPGA Tour, winning seven times.

== Career ==
Austin was born in Oneida, New York in 1948. She first played on the LPGA Tour in 1968 and went on to win seven tournaments, including five in 1977 when she tied with Judy Rankin for most on tour. She was named Player of the Year in 1977 by Golf Magazine.

She won the Wills Qantas Australian Ladies Open in 1978. A recurring tendonitis problem plagued her during 1979 and 1980, but she returned to winning form in 1981 by winning the Mayflower Classic. With that victory, she established the tradition of the winner taking a plunge into the pool with General Chairman John B. Smith.

She has held a variety of positions since the end of her tour career, including a stint as a coach for the Rollins College ladies' golf team in Winter Park, Florida. She spent several years associated with Westchester Country Club in New York. She resides in Orlando, Florida and is the former head coach of the Bishop Moore Catholic High School girls' golf team. She is now retired but plays regularly at her home course, Orange Tree Golf Club.

The junior tees at Westchester Country Club are named after her.

== Professional wins (8) ==
=== LPGA Tour wins (7) ===
No.	Date	Tournament	Winning score	Margin of victory	Runner(s)-up
1	May 1, 1977	Birmingham Classic	−9 (68-69-70=207)	1 stroke	(United States) Debbie Massey
2	Jun 26, 1977	Hoosier Classic	−9 (70-70-67=207)	2 strokes	(United States) Judy Rankin (Australia) Jan Stephenson
3	Jul 31, 1977	Pocono Northeast Classic	−6 (71-73-69=213)	1 stroke	(Canada) Sandra Post
4	Aug 14, 1977	Long Island Charity Classic	−9 (73-69-66-71=279)	2 stroke	(United States) Nancy Lopez (United States) Kathy Whitworth
5	Aug 21, 1977	Wheeling Classic	−7 (67-72-70=209)	1 stroke	(United States) Hollis Stacy
6	Feb 12, 1978	American Cancer Society Classic	−4 (68-72-72=212)	1 stroke	(United States) Beth Solomon (Japan) Nayoko Yoshikawa
7	Jul 12, 1981	Mayflower Classic	−9 (68-69-68-74=279)	4 strokes	(United States) Myra Blackwelder (United States) Hollis Stacy

=== Other wins (1) ===
- 1978 Wills Qantas Australian Ladies Open
