= Niagara Frontier Classic =

Golf tournament formerly on the LPGA Tour

The Niagara Frontier Classic was a golf tournament on the LPGA Tour from 1973 to 1974. It was played at the River Oaks Country Club in Grand Island, New York.

== Winners ==
Niagara Frontier Classic

- 1974 Sue Roberts

MARC Equity Classic

- 1973 Mary Lou Crocker
