= Gail Denenberg =

American professional golfer (born 1947)

Gail Toushin
Personal information
- Full name: Gail Denenberg Toushin
- Nationality: United States
- Born: January 17, 1947 (age 79) New York, New York, U.S.

Career
- Sport: Golf
- College: University of Miami
- Status: Professional
- Former tour: LPGA Tour (1969–1981)
- Professional wins: 1

Number of wins by tour
- LPGA Tour: 1

Best results in LPGA major championships
- Titleholders C'ship: DNP
- Chevron Championship: 69th: 1983
- Women's PGA C'ship: T14: 1975
- U.S. Women's Open: T18: 1974
- du Maurier Classic: DNP

Gail Denenberg Toushin (born January 17, 1947) is an American professional golfer. She played on the LPGA Tour.

== Career ==
Denenberg won once on the LPGA Tour in 1974.

== Professional wins (1) ==
=== LPGA Tour wins (1) ===
No.	Date	Tournament	Winning score	Margin of victory	Runner-up
1	Feb 10, 1974	Sears Women's Classic	−2 (71)	3 strokes	(United States) Jane Blalock
