= Desert Inn Classic =

Golf tournament in Las Vegas, Nevada, US

The Desert Inn Classic was a golf tournament on the LPGA Tour from 1971 to 1974. It was played at the Desert Inn Country Club in Las Vegas, Nevada.

== Winners ==
Desert Inn Classic

- 1974 JoAnne Carner

Sealy-Faberge Classic

- 1973 Kathy Cornelius

Sealy LPGA Classic

- 1972 Betty Burfeindt
- 1971 Sandra Palmer
