= Joyce Kazmierski =

American professional golfer

Personal information
- Nationality: United States
- Born: August 14, 1945 (age 81)
- Spouse: Sandra Spuzich

Career
- Sport: Golf
- College: Michigan State
- Turned professional: 1968
- Former tour: LPGA Tour

Best results in LPGA major championships
- Chevron Championship: T31: 1984
- Women's PGA C'ship: T5: 1977
- U.S. Women's Open: T8: 1979
- du Maurier Classic: T11: 1979

Joyce Kazmierski (born August 14, 1945) is an American professional golfer.

Kazmierski played college golf at Michigan State University, winning the national individual intercollegiate golf championship in 1966.

Kazmierski played on the LPGA Tour from 1968 to 1986. While never winning on tour, Kazmierski was a multiple-time runner-up and when retiring after a 17-year career was among the top 50 career money earners. Her runner-up finishes included the 1973 Sears Women's Classic, 1974 LPGA Borden Classic, 1974 National Jewish Hospital Open, 1977 Orange Blossom Classic, 1977 Greater Baltimore Golf Classic, 1978 Mayflower Classic, and 1982 Inamori Classic.

Kazmierski's life partner was fellow LPGA golfer Sandra Spuzich. Kazmierski and Spuzich were married on August 22, 2015.
