= Carol Mann =

American professional golfer (1941–2018)

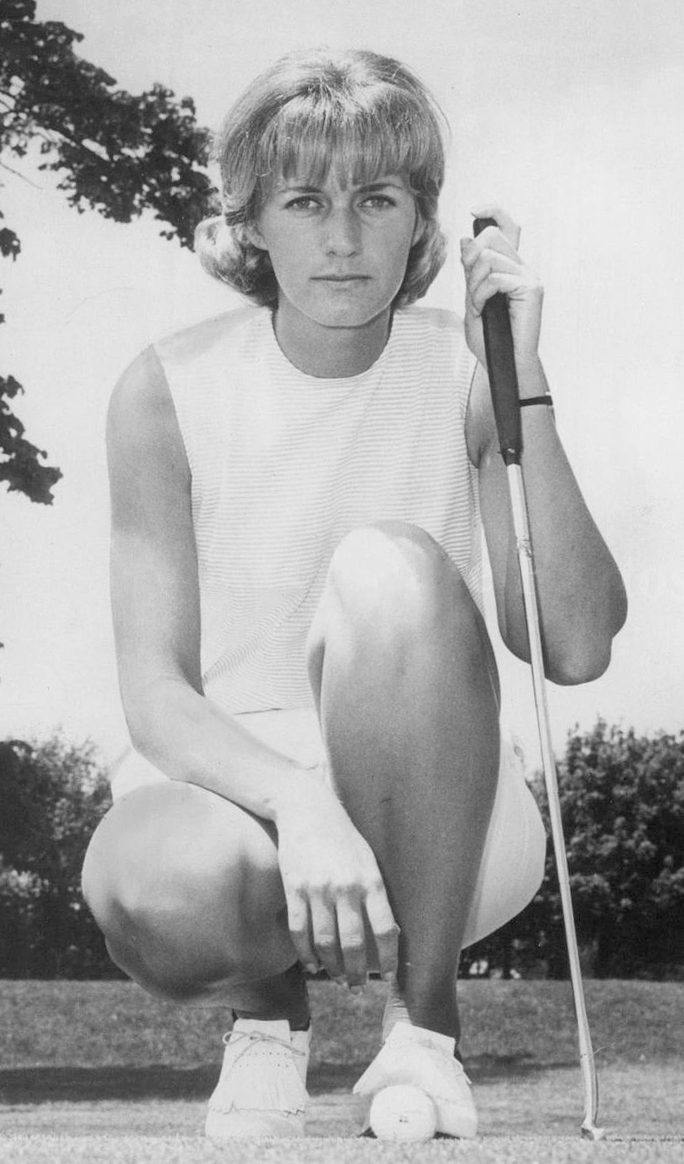
- Mann in 1968

Personal information
- Nationality: United States
- Born: February 3, 1941 Buffalo, New York, U.S.
- Died: May 20, 2018 (aged 77) The Woodlands, Texas, U.S.
- Height: 6 ft 3 in (191 cm)

Career
- Sport: Golf
- College: University of North Carolina at Greensboro
- Turned professional: 1960
- Former tour: LPGA Tour (1961-1981)
- Professional wins: 38

Number of wins by tour
- LPGA Tour: 38

Best results in LPGA major championships (wins: 2)
- Western Open: Won: 1964
- Titleholders C'ship: T5: 1965
- Women's PGA C'ship: T2: 1969
- U.S. Women's Open: Won: 1965
- du Maurier Classic: T26: 1979

Achievements and awards
- World Golf Hall of Fame: 1977 (member page)
- LPGA Vare Trophy: 1968
- LPGA Tour Money Winner: 1969
- Babe Zaharias Award: 1976
- PGA First Lady of Golf Award: 2008

Carol Mann (February 3, 1941 – May 20, 2018) was an American professional golfer. She became a member of the LPGA Tour in 1961 and won two major championships and 38 LPGA Tour events in all. She is a member of the World Golf Hall of Fame.

== Amateur career ==
Mann was born in Buffalo, New York, and grew up in Baltimore, Maryland, and Chicago, Illinois. She started playing golf at the age of 9. She won the Western Junior and the Chicago Junior in 1958, and the Chicago Women's Amateur in 1960. She attended the University of North Carolina at Greensboro.

== Professional career ==
Mann turned pro in 1960 and joined the LPGA Tour in 1961. She won her first tournament in 1964 at the Women's Western Open, a major championship at the time. She would go on to win a total of 38 events on the LPGA Tour, including two major championships. She earned the LPGA Vare Trophy in 1968 for lowest scoring average and was the tour's leading money winner in 1969. She led the tour in wins three times, 1968 with ten (tied with Kathy Whitworth), 1969 with eight, and 1975 with four (tied with Sandra Haynie). She was the LPGA's president from 1973 to 1976. She was inducted into the World Golf Hall of Fame in 1977. Her final competitive appearance came in 1981.

Mann was a long-time student of golf instructor Manuel de la Torre. She received the "First Lady of Golf Award" from the PGA of America in 2008.

Mann died at her home in The Woodlands, Texas, on May 20, 2018, at the age of 77.

== Professional wins ==
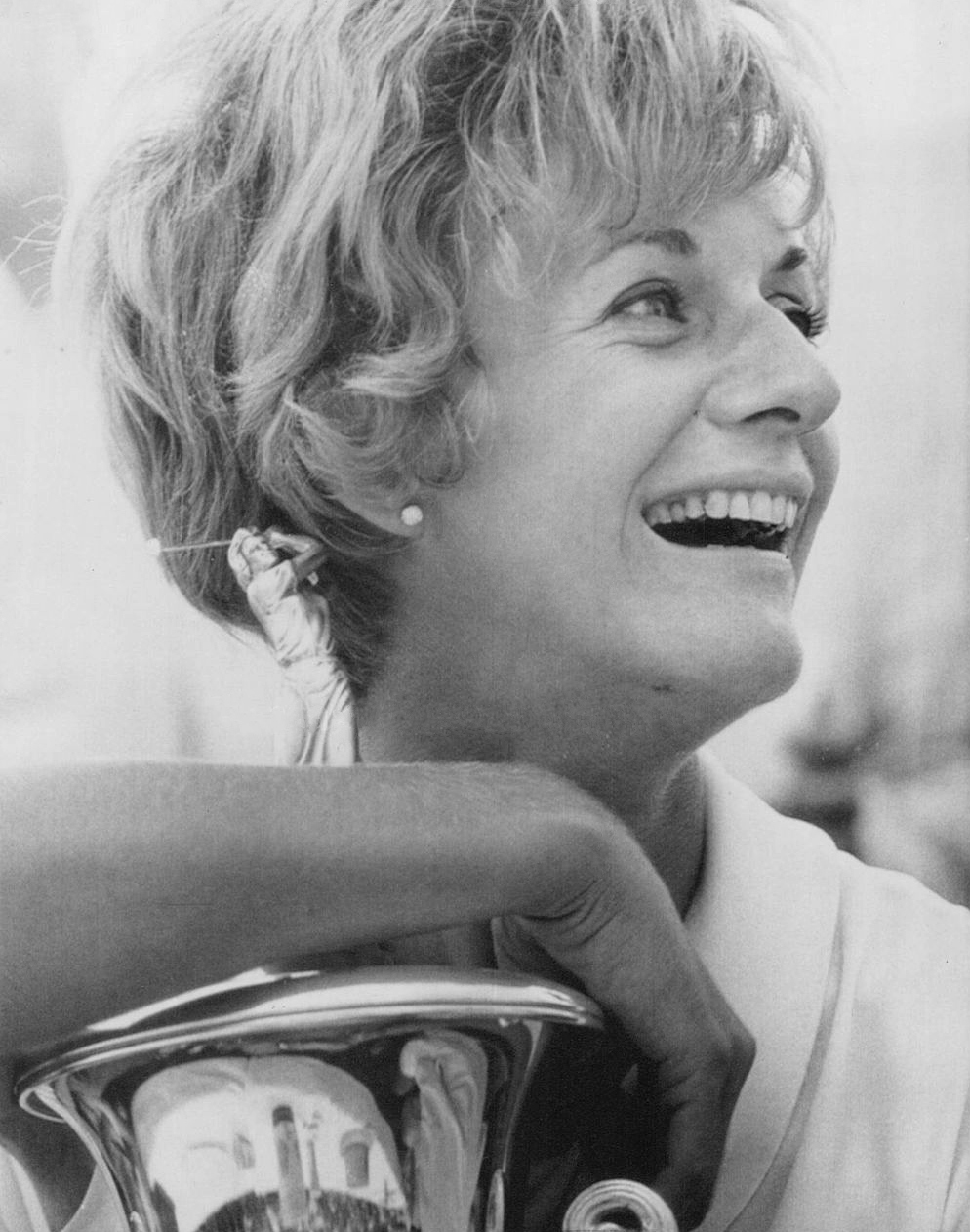
Mann with the 1968 Borden Classic Cup

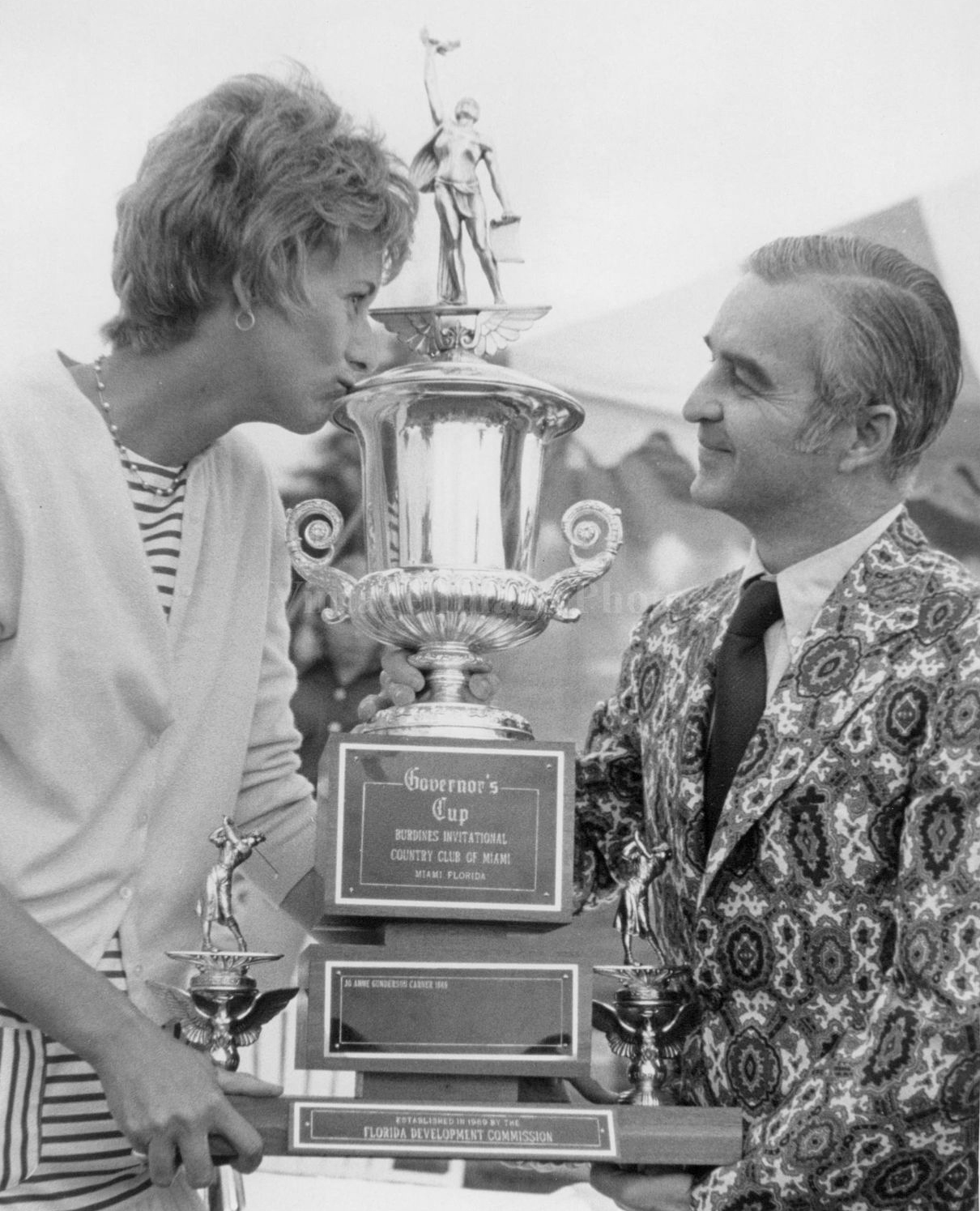
Mann with the 1970 Burdine's Invitational Cup

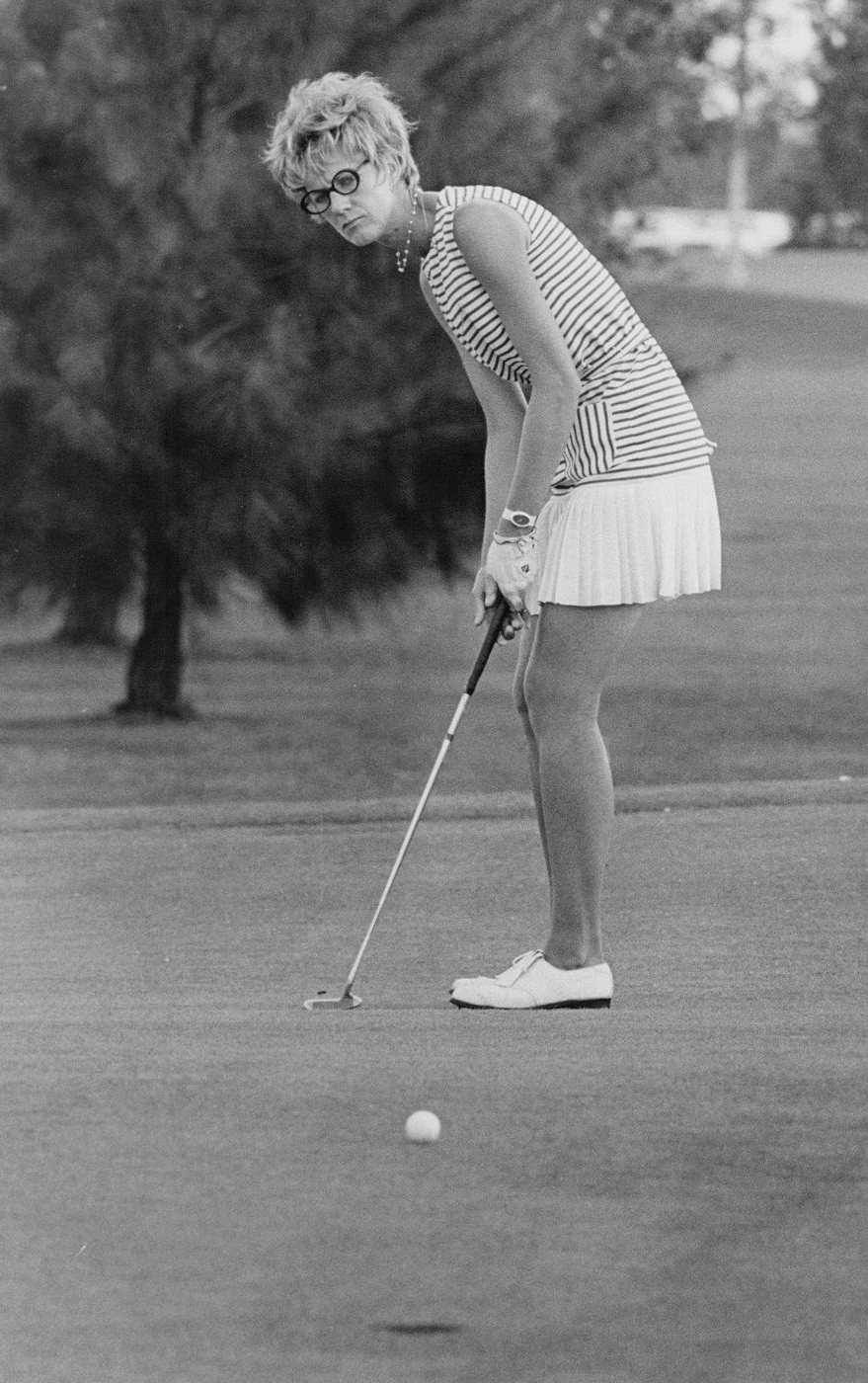
Mann in 1970

=== LPGA Tour wins (38) ===
Legend
LPGA Tour major championships (2)
Other LPGA Tour (36)

No.	Date	Tournament	Winning score	Margin of victory	Runner(s)-up
1	Mar 22, 1964	Women's Western Open	+8 (83-75-76-74=308)	2 strokes	(United States) Judy Kimball (United States) Ruth Jessen
2	Jun 27, 1965	Lady Carling Open	+1 (71-69-71=211)	3 strokes	(United States) Marlene Hagge
3	Jul 4, 1965	U.S. Women's Open	+2 (78-70-70-72=290)	2 strokes	(United States) Kathy Cornelius
4	Apr 17, 1966	Raleigh Ladies Invitational	E (72-70-74=216)	1 stroke	(United States) Jo Ann Prentice (United States) Kathy Whitworth
5	Apr 24, 1966	Peach Blossom Invitational	E (72-73-71=216)	1 stroke	(United States) Marlene Hagge
6	May 29, 1966	Baton Rouge Ladies Invitational	−7 (67-71-71=209)	2 strokes	(United States) Kathy Whitworth
7	Jun 26, 1966	Waterloo Women's Open Invitational	−2 (71-70-73=214)	2 strokes	(United States) Kathy Whitworth
8	May 7, 1967	Tall City Open	−2 (73-70-71=214)	2 strokes	(United States) Mickey Wright
9	Jun 25, 1967	Buckeye Savings Invitational	−9 (70-68-69=207)	4 strokes	(United States) Clifford Ann Creed
10	Jul 22, 1967	Supertest Ladies' Open	−6 (70-69-71=210)	2 strokes	(Australia) Margie Masters
11	Apr 21, 1968	Lady Carling Open	−16 (66-66-68=200)	10 strokes	(United States) Kathy Whitworth
12	Apr 28, 1968	Raleigh Ladies Invitational	−2 (71-71-72=214)	3 strokes	(United States) Kathy Whitworth
13	May 5, 1968	Shreveport Kiwanis Club Invitational	+1 (69-75-73=217)	1 stroke	(United States) Kathy Whitworth
14	Jun 9, 1968	Bluegrass Ladies Invitational	−6 (71-70-69=210)	4 strokes	(United States) Sandra Haynie
15	Jul 14, 1968	Pabst Ladies Classic	−10 (71-70-65=206)	3 strokes	(United States) Kathy Whitworth
16	Jul 21, 1968	Buckeye Savings Invitational	−7 (71-66-72=209)	1 stroke	(United States) Marilynn Smith
17	Jul 27, 1968	Supertest Canadian Open	−6 (69-73-71=213)	3 strokes	(United States) Judy Kimball
18	Sep 1, 1968	Willow Park Ladies Invitational	−8 (68-68-69=205)	9 strokes	(United States) Pam Barnett (United States) Shirley Englehorn (United States) Beth Stone (United States) Kathy Whitworth
19	Sep 15, 1968	Shirley Englehorn Invitational	−5 (70-69-69=208)	5 strokes	(United States) Gloria Ehret
20	Oct 20, 1968	Quality Chek'd Classic	−4 (69-74-69=212)	2 strokes	(United States) Judy Rankin
21	Apr 27, 1969	Raleigh Ladies Invitational	−4 (76-68-68=212)	1 stroke	(United States) Gloria Ehret
22	May 11, 1969	Dallas Civitan Open	−4 (68-71-70=209)	2 strokes	(United States) Donna Caponi
23	Jul 20, 1969	Danbury Lady Carling Open	−1 (71-72-72=215)	2 strokes	(United States) Sharon Miller (United States) Kathy Whitworth
24	Aug 17, 1969	Southgate Ladies Open	+1 (70-72-75=217)	1 stroke	(United States) Jan Ferraris
25	Aug 24, 1969	Tournament of Champs	−3 (76-68-72=216)	Playoff	(United States) Jan Ferraris
26	Sep 7, 1969	Molson's Canadian Open	−7 (70-70-72=212)	3 strokes	(Canada) Sandra Post (United States) Kathy Whitworth
27	Oct 5, 1969	Mickey Wright Invitational	−7 (69-70-73=212)	2 strokes	(United States) Kathy Whitworth
28	Oct 26, 1969	Corpus Christi Civitan Open	+2 (74-70-68=212)	Playoff	(United States) Kathy Whitworth
29	Feb 15, 1970	Burdine's Invitational	E (71-70-75=216)	Playoff	(United States) Sandra Haynie
30	Mar 19, 1972	Orange Blossom Classic	−3 (73-72-68=213)	2 strokes	(United States) Kathy Whitworth
31	Jun 4, 1972	Lady Carling Open	−9 (69-74-67=210)	2 strokes	(United States) Kathy Whitworth
32	Mar 25, 1973	Sears Women's Classic	−5 (68)	2 strokes	(United States) Joyce Kazmierski
33	Feb 17, 1974	Naples Lely Classic	−7 (70-70-69=209)	6 strokes	(United States) Murle Breer
34	Mar 10, 1974	S&H Green Stamp Classic	E (76-74-69=219)	2 strokes	(United States) Kathy Whitworth
35	Jun 15, 1975	Lawson's LPGA Classic	+1 (71-72-74=217)	2 strokes	(United States) Judy Rankin
36	Jul 14, 1975	Borden Classic	−7 (66-70-73=209)	1 stroke	(United States) Jan Ferraris
37	Jul 27, 1975	George Washington Ladies Classic	−13 (68-66-72=206)	4 strokes	(United States) Susie McAllister
38	Sep 7, 1975	Dallas Civitan Open	−8 (67-70-71=2068)	5 strokes	(United States) Sandra Palmer

LPGA Tour playoff record (3–2)

No.	Year	Tournament	Opponent(s)	Result
1	1965	Babe Zaharias Open	(United States) Clifford Ann Creed (United States) Marlene Hagge	Hagge won with birdie on third extra hole Mann eliminated by par on second hole
2	1969	Tournament of Champs	(United States) Jan Ferraris	Won with par on first extra hole
3	1969	Corpus Christi Civitan Open	(United States) Kathy Whitworth	Won with par on third extra hole
3	1970	Burdine's Invitational	(United States) Sandra Haynie	Won with par on first extra hole
4	1975	Peter Jackson Classic	(United States) JoAnne Carner	Lost to birdie on second extra hole

Sourxces:

== Major championships ==
=== Wins (2) ===
Year	Championship	Winning score	Margin	Runner(s)-up
1964	Women's Western Open	+8 (83-75-76-74=308)	2 strokes	(United States) Ruth Jessen, (United States) Judy Kimball
1965	U.S. Women's Open	+2 (78-70-70-72=290)	2 strokes	(United States) Kathy Cornelius

== Books ==
- American Association of University Women, (Towson, Maryland, Branch), "Baltimore County Women, 1930-1975", (Baltimore: The Sunpapers, 1976) [The book is a collection of profiles of forty Baltimore County women "who distinguished themselves" in diverse fields (including opera singer Rosa Ponselle and artist Jane Frank), compiled as part of a project celebrating the 1976 United States Bicentennial ] OCLC 7441013
- Jolee Edmondson, The woman golfer's catalogue (New York : Stein and Day, 1980) ISBN 0-8128-2685-X

== See also ==
- List of golfers with most LPGA Tour wins
