= Mary Mills (golfer) =

American golfer

Personal information
- Full name: Mary Mills
- Nationality: United States
- Born: January 19, 1940 (age 86) Laurel, Mississippi, U.S.
- Height: 5 ft 8 in (1.73 m)

Career
- Sport: Golf
- College: Millsaps College; Florida International University
- Turned professional: 1962
- Former tour: LPGA Tour (1962–81)
- Professional wins: 9

Number of wins by tour
- LPGA Tour: 9

Best results in LPGA major championships (wins: 3)
- Western Open: 4th: 1965
- Titleholders C'ship: T2: 1966
- Women's PGA C'ship: Won: 1964, 1973
- U.S. Women's Open: Won: 1963
- du Maurier Classic: DNP

Achievements and awards
- LPGA Rookie of the Year: 1962

Mary Mills (born January 19, 1940) is an American former professional golfer. She became a member of the LPGA Tour in 1962 and won three major championships and nine LPGA Tour victories in all.

== Amateur career ==
Mills was born in Laurel, Mississippi. She began playing golf at age 11 and her instructor was Johnny Revolta, an 18-time PGA Tour winner and PGA Championship victor. She won the Mississippi State Amateur eight consecutive years starting in 1954, and won the Gulf Coast Amateur twice. She was also medalist in the U.S. Girls' Junior, Western Junior, and the National Collegiate Championship. She attended Millsaps College where she was the No. 1 golfer – on the men's team – all four years.

== Professional career ==
Mills turned pro and joined the LPGA Tour in 1962, and earned LPGA Rookie of the Year honors. She posted multiple wins in three different seasons on tour, and was in the top-10 on the money list five times, with a high finish of sixth in 1973. She won the U.S. Women's Open in 1963 and the LPGA Championship in 1964 and 1973. She finished in the top ten on the money list four times, with her best finish being sixth place in 1973. She continued playing a full LPGA Tour schedule into the 1980s. She also continued her education. A philosophy major at Millsaps, she returned to school in the 1990s to earn a master's degree in landscape architecture from Florida International University. She puts that degree to use these days designing golf courses. She is also a well-regarded golf instructor.

== Professional wins ==
=== LPGA Tour wins (9) ===
Legend
LPGA Tour major championships (3)
Other LPGA Tour (6)

No.	Date	Tournament	Winning score	Margin of victory	Runner(s)-up
1	Jul 20, 1963	U.S. Women's Open	−3 (71-70-75-73=289)	3 strokes	(United States) Sandra Haynie (United States) Louise Suggs
2	Sep 13, 1964	Eugene Ladies' Open	+1 (70-68-75-76=289)	3 strokes	(United States) Sandra Haynie
3	Oct 4, 1964	LPGA Championship	−6 (68-69-72-69=278)	2 strokes	(United States) Mickey Wright
4	Aug 15, 1965	St. Louis Open	−3 (73-71-72=216)	2 strokes	(United States) Marlene Hagge (United States) Carol Mann
5	Sep 12, 1965	Eugene Open	+6 (75-74-73-72=294)	1 stroke	(United States) Jo Ann Prentice
6	Oct 19, 1969	Quality Chek'd Classic	−3 (70-73-70=213)	1 stroke	(United States) Carol Mann
7	Jun 28, 1970	Len Immke Buick Open	E (73-74-69=216)	Playoff	(United States) Althea Gibson (United States) Sandra Haynie
8	Jun 10, 1973	LPGA Championship	−4 (73-73-72-70=288)	1 stroke	(United States) Betty Burfeindt
9	Jul 1, 1973	Lady Tara Classic	−2 (77-70-70=217)	1 stroke	(United States) Laura Baugh (United States) Sandra Haynie (United States) Sharon Miller (United States) Judy Rankin

LPGA Tour playoff record (1–1)

No.	Year	Tournament	Opponent(s)	Result
1	1970	Len Immke Buick Open	(United States) Althea Gibson (United States) Sandra Haynie	Won with par on second extra hole Haynie eliminated by birdie on first hole
2	1973	Dallas Civitan Open	(United States) Kathy Whitworth	Lost to par on second extra hole

== Major championships ==
=== Wins (3) ===
Year	Championship	Winning score	Margin	Runner(s)-up
1963	U.S. Women's Open	−3 (71-70-75-73=289)	3 strokes	(United States) Sandra Haynie, (United States) Louise Suggs
1964	LPGA Championship	−6 (68-69-72-69=278)	2 strokes	(United States) Mickey Wright
1973	LPGA Championship	−4 (73-73-72-70=288)	1 stroke	(United States) Betty Burfeindt

== See also ==
- List of golfers with most LPGA major championship wins
