= Laura Baugh =

American professional golfer (born 1955)

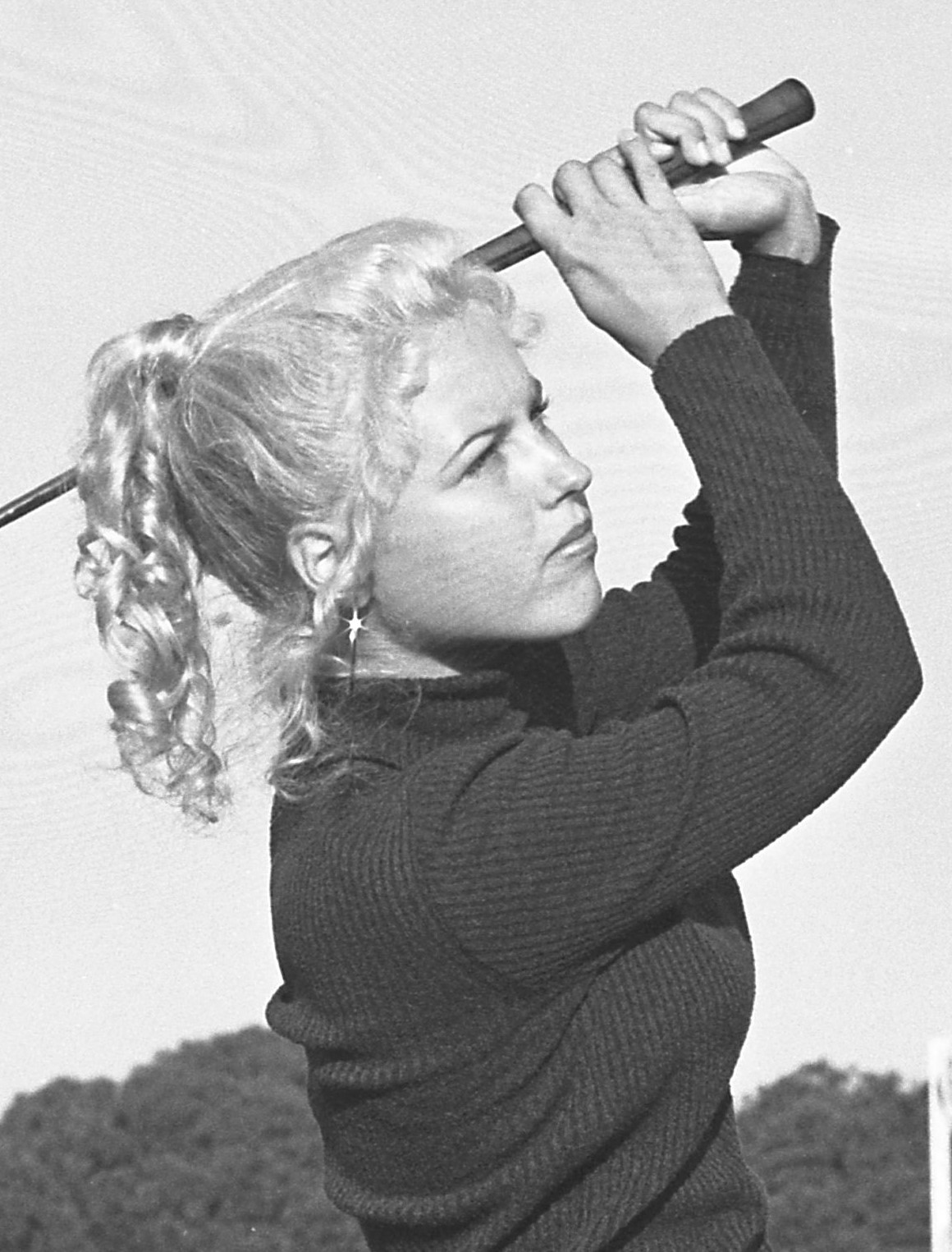
- Baugh in 1972

Personal information
- Full name: Laura Zonetta Baugh
- Nationality: United States
- Born: May 31, 1955 (age 71) Gainesville, Florida, U.S.
- Height: 5 ft 4.5 in (1.64 m)
- Children: 7

Career
- Sport: Golf
- Turned professional: 1973
- Former tour: LPGA Tour (1973–2001)

Best results in LPGA major championships
- Titleholders C'ship: 42nd: 1972
- Chevron Championship: T17: 1986, 1991
- Women's PGA C'ship: T10: 1979
- U.S. Women's Open: T8: 1979
- du Maurier Classic: T14: 1985
- Women's British Open: DNP

Achievements and awards
- LPGA Tour Rookie of the Year: 1973

Laura Zonetta Baugh (born May 31, 1955) is an American professional golfer, who played the LPGA Tour for 25 years. She is a published writer and golf broadcaster.

== Early life ==
Baugh was born in Gainesville, Florida. Her father Hale Baugh, a lawyer who competed at the 1948 Summer Olympics as a modern pentathlete, was a very good amateur golfer, who introduced his children to golf at early ages. She won the National PeeWee Golf Championship five times, her first coming at age three. Her parents divorced when she was 11 years old, and she moved with her mother from their Florida home to Long Beach, California. Lacking the money to pay green fees, she and friends would sneak onto golf courses to play. At age 14 she won her first of two straight Los Angeles Women's City Golf Championships. Her older brother Beau Baugh played professionally for a time. She graduated from high school at the age of 16 with excellent grades. She studied at Long Beach City College and California State University, Long Beach.

== Amateur career ==
In 1971, at the age of 16, at the Atlanta Country Club in Atlanta, Georgia, she defeated Beth Barry, 1 up, in the 36-hole final match to win the U.S. Women's Amateur, becoming the youngest champion in the event's 76-year history to that stage. Her physical appearance brought her considerable publicity, and for 1971 she was chosen as a Los Angeles Times "Woman of the Year". In 1972 she won Golf Digest's "Most Beautiful Golfer." She made a television commercial for UltraBrite toothpaste that won a Clio Award. Baugh was a member of the U.S. teams that won the 1972 Curtis Cup and the 1972 Espirito Santo Trophy, where Baugh finished tied third in the individual competition. Baugh was offered a full academic scholarship to Stanford University, but she declined because Stanford did not have a women's golf team.

== Professional career ==
She turned professional in 1973 and after signing with the International Management Group, soon had lucrative contracts with Ford, Rolex, Suzuki, The Ladies Home Journal, Wilson, Bermuda's Tourist Bureau and Colgate Palmolive. She had not yet turned 18, so she was ineligible to join the LPGA Tour, but was eligible to play in Japan. She played several events on the LPGA of Japan Tour, where her appearance attracted immense interest and publicity.

She earned her LPGA Tour card on her first attempt in 1973, and the very next week placed second in her tour debut. She earned 1973 Rookie of the Year honors.

During her professional golf career from 1973 through 2001, Baugh earned 71 top-10 finishes, including ten runners-up. She earned significant prize money, and supplemented this with even greater earnings from endorsements and golf outings.

She has worked as a television announcer for The Golf Channel.

After her LPGA Tour career, she became a member of the Legends Tour, formerly known as the Women's Senior Golf Tour, was part of the process to make the U.S. Senior Women’s Open a reality and played in the 2018 inaugural event at the Chicago Golf Club.

== Personal life ==
Baugh has been married four times, in her second and third marriage (divorced in 1985 but remarried two years later) to PGA Tour winner Bobby Cole, the father of her seven children, including professional golfer Eric Cole, who was the 2022–23 PGA Tour Rookie of the Year.

Despite her successful start and prodigious talent, alcoholism and emotional problems took over her life, and she never won an LPGA tournament. Her drinking caused spontaneous bleeding that could have ended her life, had she not sought treatment that included time at the Betty Ford Clinic in 1996. She described her battle with alcohol in a 1999 book titled "Out of the Rough."

After 25 years living in Orlando, Florida, Baugh moved to Augusta, Georgia, in 2013 and to Ponte Vedra Beach, Florida in 2016, to serve as a golf instructor at Sawgrass Country Club.

== Amateur wins ==
- 1971 U.S. Women's Amateur

== Playoff record ==
LPGA Tour playoff record (0–1)

No.	Year	Tournament	Opponents	Result
1	1979	Mayflower Classic	(United States) Judy Rankin (United States) Hollis Stacy	Stacy won with par on second extra hole Rankin eliminated by par on first hole

== U.S. national team appearances ==
Amateur

- Curtis Cup: 1972 (winners)
- Espirito Santo Trophy: 1972 (winners)
