= Gloria Ehret =

American professional golfer

Personal information
- Full name: Gloria Jean Ehret
- Nationality: United States
- Born: August 23, 1941 (age 85) Allentown, Pennsylvania, U.S.
- Height: 5 ft 8 in (1.73 m)

Career
- Sport: Golf
- College: St. Petersburg Junior College
- Turned professional: 1965
- Former tour: LPGA Tour (joined 1965)
- Professional wins: 3

Number of wins by tour
- LPGA Tour: 2
- Other: 1

Best results in LPGA major championships (wins: 1)
- Western Open: T10: 1966
- Titleholders C'ship: 15th: 1966
- Women's PGA C'ship: Won: 1966
- U.S. Women's Open: T2: 1973

Gloria Jean Ehret (born August 23, 1941) is an American former professional golfer. In the 1966, she won the LPGA Championship.

== Early life and amateur career ==
Ehret was born in Allentown, Pennsylvania, on August 23, 1941. She attended St. Petersburg Junior College in St. Petersburg, Florida.

== Professional career ==
In 1965, Ehret turned professional. She finished fifth in the LPGA Championship in her rookie season and won it the following year.

After over six years on tour without another victory, she won the Birmingham Classic in 1973. Her most lucrative year on the LPGA Tour was 1978 when she earned $42,470.60, placed 22nd on the final money list, and had three runner-up finishes.

== Amateur wins ==
- 1963 Tri-State Amateur Championship
- 1964 Tri-State Amateur Championship, International Four-Ball, Connecticut State Amateur

== Professional wins (3) ==
=== LPGA Tour wins (2) ===
Legend
LPGA Tour major championships (1)
Other LPGA Tour (1)

No.	Date	Tournament	Winning score	Margin of victory	Runner(s)-up
1	Sep 25, 1966	LPGA Championship	−2 (70-70-67-75=282)	3 strokes	(United States) Mickey Wright
2	Apr 29, 1973	Birmingham Classic	+1 (73-75-69=217)	Playoff	(United States) Betty Burfeindt (United States) Clifford Ann Creed

LPGA Tour playoff record (1–4)

No.	Year	Tournament	Opponent(s)	Result
1	1966	Glass City Classic	(United States) Sandra Haynie	Lost to birdie on third extra hole
2	1972	Bluegrass Invitational	(United States) Kathy Cornelius	Lost to birdie on first extra hole
3	1973	Birmingham Classic	(United States) Betty Burfeindt (United States) Clifford Ann Creed	Won with birdie on first extra hole
4	1974	Lawson's LPGA Open	(United States) Sandra Haynie	Lost to par on fourth extra hole
5	1978	Natural Light Lady Tara Classic	(United States) Janet Coles (United States) Hollis Stacy	Coles won with birdie on third extra hole Stacy eliminated by par on first hole

=== Other wins (1) ===
- 1965 Yankee Women's Open (with Judy Kimball)

== Major championships ==
=== Wins (1) ===
Year	Championship	Winning score	Margin	Runner-up
1966	LPGA Championship	−2 (70-70-67-75=282)	3 strokes	(United States) Mickey Wright
