= Susie Berning =

American professional golfer (1941–2024)

Personal information
- Full name: Suzanne Maxwell Berning
- Nationality: United States
- Born: July 22, 1941 Pasadena, California, U.S.
- Died: October 2, 2024 (aged 83) Indio, California, U.S.
- Height: 5 ft 2 in (1.57 m)
- Spouse: Dale Berning
- Children: 2

Career
- Sport: Golf
- College: Oklahoma City University
- Turned professional: 1964
- Former tour: LPGA Tour (1964–1996)
- Professional wins: 13

Number of wins by tour
- LPGA Tour: 11
- Other: 2

Best results in LPGA major championships (wins: 4)
- Western Open: Won: 1965
- Titleholders C'ship: 13th: 1966
- Chevron Championship: T38: 1984
- Women's PGA C'ship: T2: 1969
- U.S. Women's Open: Won: 1968, 1972, 1973
- du Maurier Classic: T25: 1984

Achievements and awards
- World Golf Hall of Fame: 2021 (member page)
- LPGA Rookie of the Year: 1964
- LPGA Most Improved Player: 1967

Suzanne Maxwell Berning (July 22, 1941 – October 2, 2024) was an American professional golfer. She became a member of the LPGA Tour in 1964 and won four major championships and eleven LPGA Tour victories in all. She also competed under her maiden name Susie Maxwell from 1964 to 1968. She was inducted into the World Golf Hall of Fame in 2022.

== Early life and amateur career ==
Suzanne Maxwell was born in Pasadena, California. Her family moved to Oklahoma City, Oklahoma, when she was 13. After taking up golf at the age of 15, she immediately won three-straight Oklahoma State High School Championships. She also won the Oklahoma City Women's Amateur from 1959 to 1961. In 1963, she won the Oklahoma Women's Amateur.

She was the first woman to receive a golf scholarship from Oklahoma City University, where she competed on the men's team.

== Professional career ==
In 1964, Maxwell turned pro and joined the LPGA Tour that year. She earned LPGA Rookie of the Year honors. She won her first tournament in 1965 at the Muskogee Civitan Open.

She won 11 times on the Tour, a high proportion of her wins coming in major championships, the 1965 Women's Western Open and the U.S. Women's Open in 1968, 1972 and 1973.

However, her form was inconsistent from her late 20s on, with the last of her three top-10 finishes on the money list coming in 1969. She stayed on the Tour for many years, though she did not always play full-time, and played 13 events as late as 1995. She made her final appearance on the Tour in 1996.

After retiring from tour play, Berning became a well-respected teaching professional, spending time at the Nicholas-Flick Golf Academy and dividing her time between The Reserve Club in Palm Springs, California and Maroon Creek Country Club in Aspen, Colorado.

== Personal life ==
She had two daughters, Robin Doctor and Cindy Molchany, from her marriage to Dale Berning, which ended in divorce in 1997. At the 1989 Konica San Jose Classic, she and Robin became the first mother-daughter pair to play in the same LPGA Tour event.

Berning died from lung cancer at her home in Indio, California, on October 2, 2024, at the age of 83.

== Awards and honors ==
- In 1964, she earned the LPGA Rookie of the Year award.
- In 1967, she was named the LPGA's Most Improved Player.
- In 2020, she was inducted into the World Golf Hall of Fame

== Professional wins (13) ==
=== LPGA Tour wins (11) ===
Legend
LPGA Tour major championships (4)
Other LPGA Tour (7)

No.	Date	Tournament	Winning score	Margin of victory	Runner(s)-up
1	May 16, 1965	Muskogee Civitan Open	−3 (71-72-70=213)	5 strokes	(United States) Kathy Cornelius (United States) Judy Kimball (United States) Mickey Wright
2	Jun 13, 1965	Women's Western Open	−2 (73-72-76-69=290)	3 strokes	(United States) Marlene Hagge
3	Apr 2, 1967	Louise Suggs Invitational	+8 (75-72-77=224)	Playoff	(United States) Sandra Haynie
4	Jun 18, 1967	Milwaukee Jaycee Open	E (68-73-75=216)	5 strokes	(United States) Barbara Romack (United States) Judy Kimball (United States) Judy Rankin (United States) Peggy Wilson
5	Jul 7, 1968	U.S. Women's Open	+5 (69-73-76-71=289)	3 strokes	(United States) Mickey Wright
6	Jun 8, 1969	Lady Carling Open	−6 (69-74-70=213)	1 stroke	(United States) Donna Caponi
7	Jun 22, 1969	Pabst Ladies Classic	−5 (69-71-71=211)	1 stroke	(United States) Donna Caponi (United States) Clifford Ann Creed (United States) Shirley Englehorn
8	Jul 2, 1972	U.S. Women's Open	+11 (79-76-73-71=299)	1 stroke	(United States) Kathy Ahern (United States) Pam Barnett (United States) Judy Rankin
9	Jun 24, 1973	Heritage Village Open	−12 (68-70-69=207)	4 strokes	(United States) Sandra Haynie
10	Jul 22, 1973	U.S. Women's Open	−3 (73-77-69-72=290)	5 strokes	(United States) Gloria Ehret (United States) Shelley Hamlin
11	Jul 25, 1976	Lady Keystone Open	−1 (72-71-72=215)	3 strokes	(United States) Pat Bradley (United States) Sandra Haynie

LPGA Tour playoff record (1–1)

No.	Year	Tournament	Opponent	Result
1	1966	Lady Carling Open	(United States) Clifford Ann Creed	Lost to birdie on first extra hole
2	1967	Louise Suggs Invitational	(United States) Sandra Haynie	Won with birdie on second extra hole

=== Other wins (2) ===
- 1975 Lady Keystone Open
- 1997 Sprint Senior Challenge

== Major championships ==
=== Wins (4) ===
Year	Championship	Winning score	Margin	Runner(s)-up
1965	Women's Western Open	−2 (73-72-76-69=290)	3 strokes	(United States) Marlene Hagge
1968	U.S. Women's Open	+5 (69-73-76-71=289)	3 strokes	(United States) Mickey Wright
1972	U.S. Women's Open	+11 (79-73-76-71=299)	1 stroke	(United States) Kathy Ahern, (United States) Pam Barnett, (United States) Judy Rankin
1973	U.S. Women's Open	+2 (72-77-69-72=290)	5 strokes	(United States) Gloria Ehret, (United States) Shelley Hamlin

== See also ==
- List of golfers with most LPGA Tour wins
- List of golfers with most LPGA major championship wins
