= Sharon Miller (golfer) =

American professional golfer (born 1941)

Personal information
- Full name: Sharon Kay Miller
- Nationality: United States
- Born: January 13, 1941 (age 85) Marshall, Michigan, U.S.
- Height: 5 ft 3.5 in (1.61 m)

Career
- Sport: Golf
- College: Western Michigan University
- Turned professional: 1966
- Former tour: LPGA Tour (1966–1980)
- Professional wins: 3

Number of wins by tour
- LPGA Tour: 2
- Other: 1

Best results in LPGA major championships
- Western Open: T8: 1967
- Titleholders C'ship: 16th: 1972
- Chevron Championship: CUT: 1984
- Women's PGA C'ship: T3: 1972
- U.S. Women's Open: T5: 1976
- du Maurier Classic: DNP

Sharon Kay Miller (born January 13, 1941) is an American professional golfer who played on the LPGA Tour.

Miller was born in Marshall, Michigan. She attended Western Michigan University where she lettered in five sports; golf, tennis, field hockey, basketball, and volleyball. She was inducted into the WMU Hall of Fame in 1991.

Miller won twice on the LPGA Tour, in 1973 and 1974.

She also won an unofficial event in 1968.[5]

After retiring from the tour, Miller became a teaching professional.

== Professional wins ==
=== LPGA Tour wins (2) ===
No.	Date	Tournament	Winning score	Margin of Victory	Runner-up
1	Oct 28, 1973	Corpus Christi Civitan Open	-6 (72-68-70=210)	Playoff	(United States) Judy Rankin
2	Jul 14, 1974	LPGA Borden Classic	-5 (69-69-73=211)	1 stroke	(United States) Joyce Kazmierski

LPGA Tour playoff record (1–0)

No.	Year	Tournament	Opponent(s)	Result
1	1973	Corpus Christi Civitan Open	(United States) Judy Rankin	Won with birdie on first extra hole

=== Other wins ===
- 1968 Seven Lakes Invitational
