= Sandra Palmer (golfer) =

American professional golfer (born 1943)

Personal information
- Full name: Sandra Palmer
- Nationality: United States
- Born: March 10, 1943 (age 83) Fort Worth, Texas, U.S.
- Height: 5 ft 1.5 in (1.56 m)

Career
- Sport: Golf
- College: North Texas State University
- Turned professional: 1964
- Former tour: LPGA Tour (1964–1997)
- Professional wins: 28

Number of wins by tour
- LPGA Tour: 19
- LPGA of Japan Tour: 2
- Other: 7

Best results in LPGA major championships (wins: 2)
- Western Open: T18: 1967
- Titleholders C'ship: Won: 1972
- Chevron Championship: T10: 1986
- Women's PGA C'ship: 3rd: 1970, 1974
- U.S. Women's Open: Won: 1975
- du Maurier Classic: T9: 1982

Achievements and awards
- World Golf Hall of Fame: 2023 (member page)
- LPGA Tour Money Winner: 1975
- LPGA Tour Player of the Year: 1975
- GWAA Female Player of the Year: 1975

Sandra Palmer (born March 10, 1943) is an American professional golfer. She became a member of the LPGA Tour in 1964 and won 19 LPGA Tour events, including two major championships, during her career. She was elected to the World Golf Hall of Fame in 2023 and was inducted in 2024.

== Early life and amateur career ==
In 1943, Palmer was born in Fort Worth, Texas. However, she grew up (and first played golf) in Bangor, Maine.

She attended North Texas State University where she was a cheerleader and Homecoming Queen. In 1961, she was runner-up at the National Collegiate Championship. While at North Texas State, Palmer joined Alpha Delta Pi sorority. She was a four-time winner of the West Texas Amateur and won the Texas State Amateur in 1963.

== Professional career ==
In 1964, Palmer turned professional and became a member of the LPGA Tour. She won 19 events on tour and also several other professional events including some as a senior.

Her two wins in major championships came at the 1972 Titleholders Championship and the 1975 U.S. Women's Open. She topped the money list for 1975 and was awarded the LPGA Player of the Year title. Her ten top-10 finishes on the money list came in ten straight years from 1968 to 1977. She played her last event on the Tour in 1997.

== Awards and honors ==
- In 1975, Palmer led the LPGA's money list and was LPGA Tour Player of the Year.
- In 2023, she was elected to the World Golf Hall of Fame and was inducted in 2024.

== Amateur wins ==
- 1963 Texas State Amateur

== Professional wins (28) ==
=== LPGA Tour wins (19) ===
Legend
LPGA Tour major championships (2)
Other LPGA Tour (17)

No.	Date	Tournament	Winning score	Margin of victory	Runner(s)-up
1	May 16, 1971	Sealy LPGA Classic	−3 (77-69-72-71=289)	2 strokes	(United States) Donna Caponi
2	Jun 20, 1971	Heritage Open	−8 (71-70-70=211)	1 stroke	(Japan) Chako Higuchi
3	May 29, 1972	**Titleholders Championship**	−1 (71-68-72-72=283)	10 strokes	(United States) Judy Rankin (United States) Mickey Wright
4	Feb 18, 1973	Pompano Beach Classic	−1 (72-73-70=215)	Playoff	(United States) Betty Burfeindt
5	May 19, 1973	St. Paul Open	−7 (70-68-71=209)	1 stroke	(United States) Jane Blalock (United States) Judy Rankin
6	Aug 26, 1973	National Jewish Hospital Open	−3 (73-69-68=210)	1 stroke	(United States) Betty Burfeindt
7	Sep 30, 1973	Cameron Park Open	−7 (73-72-67=212)	2 strokes	(United States) Susie Maxwell (United States) Gail Toushin
8	Feb 4, 1974	Burdine's Invitational	−3 (70-69-76=215)	Playoff	(United States) Kathy Whitworth
9	Oct 21, 1974	Cubic Corporation Classic	−1 (72-72-71=215)	1 stroke	(United States) Kathy McMullen
10	Apr 20, 1975	Colgate-Dinah Shore Winner's Circle	−5 (70-70-70-73=283)	1 stroke	(United States) Kathy McMullen
11	Jul 20, 1975	**U.S. Women's Open**	+7 (78-74-71-72=295)	4 strokes	(United States) JoAnne Carner (United States) Nancy Lopez (a) (Canada) Sandra Post
12	Jul 4, 1976	Bloomington Bicentennial Classic	−7 (71-67-71=209)	1 stroke	(United States) Laura Baugh (United States) JoAnne Carner
13	Aug 29, 1976	National Jewish Hospital Open	−10 (69-70-67=206)	2 strokes	(United States) Pat Bradley
14	Sep 5, 1976	Jerry Lewis Muscular Dystrophy Classic	−3 (71-68-74=213)	Playoff	(United States) JoAnne Carner (United States) Mary Lou Crocker (England) Michelle Walker
15	Mar 27, 1977	Kathryn Crosby/Honda Civic Classic	−7 (70-68-69-74=281)	4 strokes	(United States) Hollis Stacy
16	Apr 17, 1977	Women's International	−7 (70-72-69-70=281)	2 strokes	(United States) Jane Blalock
17	Feb 1, 1981	Whirlpool Championship of Deer Creek	−8 (66-69-74-75=284)	2 strokes	(United States) Amy Alcott
18	Aug 8, 1982	Boston Five Classic	−7 (74-67-71-69=281)	1 stroke	(United States) Terri Moody
19	Jun 29, 1986	Mayflower Classic	−8 (68-68-72-72=280)	Playoff	(United States) Christa Johnson (Australia) Jan Stephenson

LPGA Tour playoff record (4–5)

No.	Year	Tournament	Opponent(s)	Result
1	1972	Corpus Christi Civitan Open	(United States) Jo Ann Prentice (United States) Kathy Whitworth	Prentice won with birdie on tenth extra hole Whitworth eliminated by birdie on third hole
2	1972	Lady Errol Classic	(United States) Jane Blalock (United States) Kathy Whitworth	Blalock won with birdie on third extra hole
3	1973	Pompano Beach Classic	(United States) Betty Burfeindt	Won with birdie on first extra hole
4	1973	GNA Classic	(West Germany) Gerda Boykin (United States) Judy Rankin	Rankin won with par on third extra hole Boykin eliminated by par on first hole
5	1974	Burdine's Invitational	(United States) Kathy Whitworth	Won with birdie on fifth extra hole
6	1976	Orange Blossom Classic	(United States) JoAnne Carner	Lost to par on fourth extra hole
7	1976	**U.S. Women's Open**	(United States) JoAnne Carner	Lost 18-hole playoff (Carner:76, Palmer.:78)
8	1976	Jerry Lewis Muscular Dystrophy Classic	(United States) JoAnne Carner (United States) Mary Lou Crocker (England) Michelle Walker	Won with birdie on third extra hole Crocker and Walker eliminated by par on first hole
9	1986	Mayflower Classic	(United States) Christa Johnson (Australia) Jan Stephenson	Won with birdie on first extra hole

LPGA majors are shown in bold.
Note: Palmer won the Colgate-Dinah Shore Winner's Circle (now known as the Kraft Nabisco Championship) before it became a major championship.

=== LPGA of Japan Tour wins (2) ===
- 1970 Tokai Classic
- 1973 TV Shizuoka Central Ladies

=== Other wins (7) ===
- 1972 Angelo's Four-Ball Championship (with Jane Blalock)
- 1973 Angelo's Four-Ball Championship (with Jane Blalock)
- 1991 Centel Senior Challenge
- 1992 Centel Senior Challenge
- 1993 Sprint Senior Challenge
- 1994 Sprint Senior Challenge
- 1995 Sprint Senior Challenge

== Major championships ==
=== Wins (2) ===
Year	Championship	Winning score	Margin	Runners-up
1972	Titleholders Championship	−1 (71-68-72-72=283)	10 strokes	(United States) Judy Rankin, (United States) Mickey Wright
1975	U.S. Women's Open	+7 (78-74-71-72=295)	4 strokes	(United States) JoAnne Carner, (United States) Nancy Lopez (a), (Canada) Sandra Post

== See also ==
- List of golfers with most LPGA Tour wins
