= Sutton, Massachusetts =

Town in Massachusetts, United States

- Town
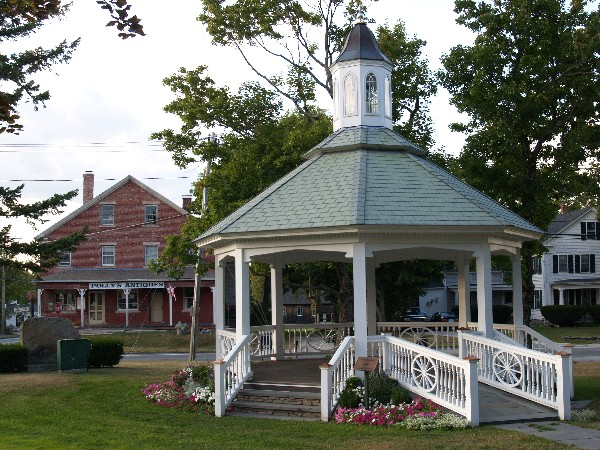
- Partial view of the Sutton Center Historic District in 2007.

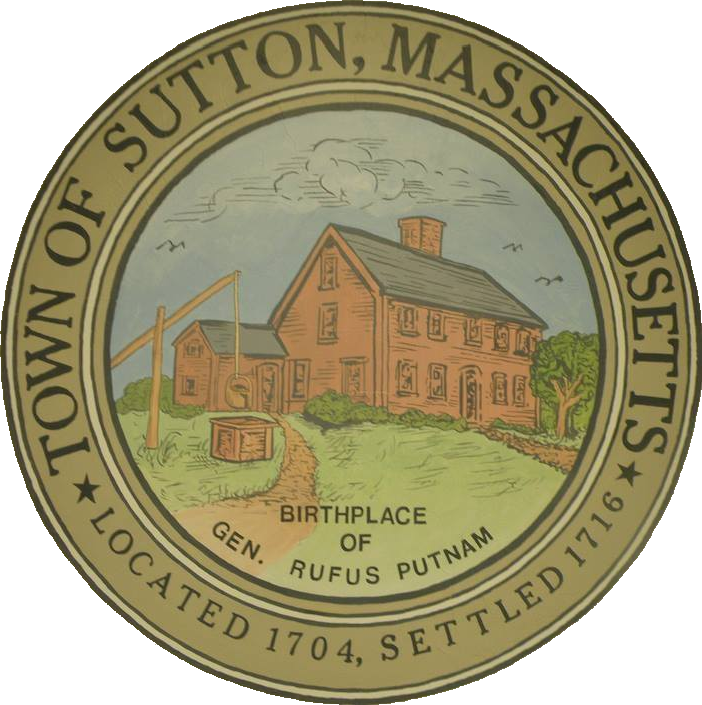
- Seal

- Location in Worcester County and the state of Massachusetts.
- Coordinates: 42°09′00″N 71°45′48″W
- Country: United States
- State: Massachusetts
- County: Worcester
- Settled: 1704
- Incorporated: 1716

Government
  - Type: Open town meeting
  - Town Manager: Austin Cyganiewicz
  - Select Board: Jesse Limanek; Christine Watkins; Jonathan Anderson; James Ettamarna; Daniel Spengler

Area
  - Total: 33.9 sq mi (87.9 km^{2})
  - Land: 32.4 sq mi (83.9 km^{2})
  - Water: 1.5 sq mi (4.0 km^{2})
- Elevation: 705 ft (215 m)

Population (2020)
  - Total: 9,357
  - Density: 289/sq mi (112/km^{2})
- Time zone: UTC−5 (Eastern)
  - Summer (DST): UTC−4 (Eastern)
- ZIP Codes: 01590 (Sutton); 01588 (Whitinsville)
- Area code: 508/774
- FIPS code: 25-68610
- GNIS feature ID: 0619491
- Website: www.suttonma.org

Sutton, officially the Town of Sutton, is a town in Worcester County, Massachusetts, United States. The population was 9,357 in the 2020 United States census. Located in the Blackstone Valley, the town was designated as a Preserve America community in 2004.

== History ==
A Nipmuc, John Wampas, visited England in 1627 and deeded land in the Sutton area to Edward Pratt, who later sold interests to others. Competing claims involving the Nipmucs led to a Massachusetts General Court case in 1704, which granted Pratt and fellow proprietors an eight-mile-square section of land, which is now Sutton.

Three families were the first to settle in Sutton, namely those of Elisha Johnson, Nathaniel Johnson, and Benjamin Marsh, who is credited as a founder of the town and the First Baptist Church of Sutton. In 1717, The Great Snow completely buried structures their home cabins. According to accounts, a local Indigenous person rescued the Johnson family by noticing smoke from their chimney through the snow. Marsh served in several capacities for the town including as a selectman and moderator. He also served as elder and pastor from 1737 until his death in 1775.

By 1735, area inhabited by Hassanamisco Nipmuc and a small portion of the northeastern Sutton had incorporated as the town of Grafton. In 1813, the northern part of Sutton became Millbury.

In 1737, the Edward Putnam House, one of the oldest homes in Sutton, was built by its namesake and cousin of the military officer Rufus Putnam. The house is featured on the town seal.

On September 26, 1777, Holman's Regiment of Militia was called up in Sutton during the American Revolutionary War.

Since 1962, the Pleasant Valley Country Club has hosted a number of notable Professional Golfers' Association of America tournaments such as the Booz Allen Classic, the Lady Carling Eastern Open, and the New England Classic. The 1968-67 and 1970-74 Women's PGA Championship took place at Pleasant Valley. From 1965 to 1973, golfer Paul Harney worked there.

In 1984, Vaillancourt Folk Art, noted makers of chalkware, was established in Sutton.

In 2004, Sutton was designated as a Preserve America community.

== Geography ==
According to the United States Census Bureau, the town has a total area of 33.9 square miles (88 km^{2}), of which 32.4 square miles (84 km^{2}) is land and 1.5 square miles (3.9 km^{2}), or 4.57%, is water.

The town contains five villages, known as Manchaug, South Sutton, Sutton Center, West Sutton, and Wilkinsonville. Located in the Blackstone Valley, Sutton shares its borders with the towns of Douglas, Grafton, Millbury, Northbridge, Oxford, and Uxbridge.

=== Historic places ===
Sutton has seven sites on the National Register of Historic Places:

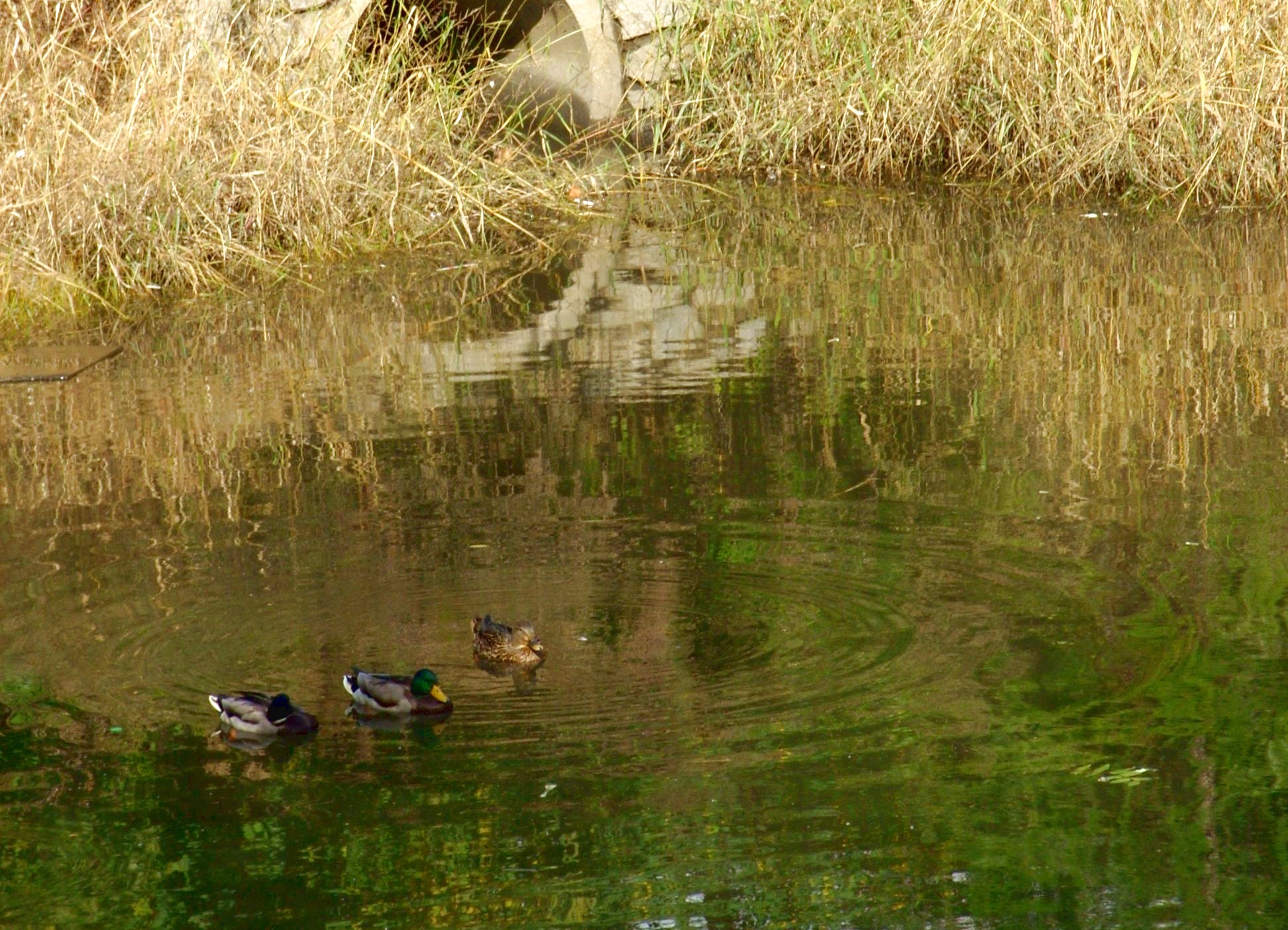
Blackstone Canal Historic District (1995)

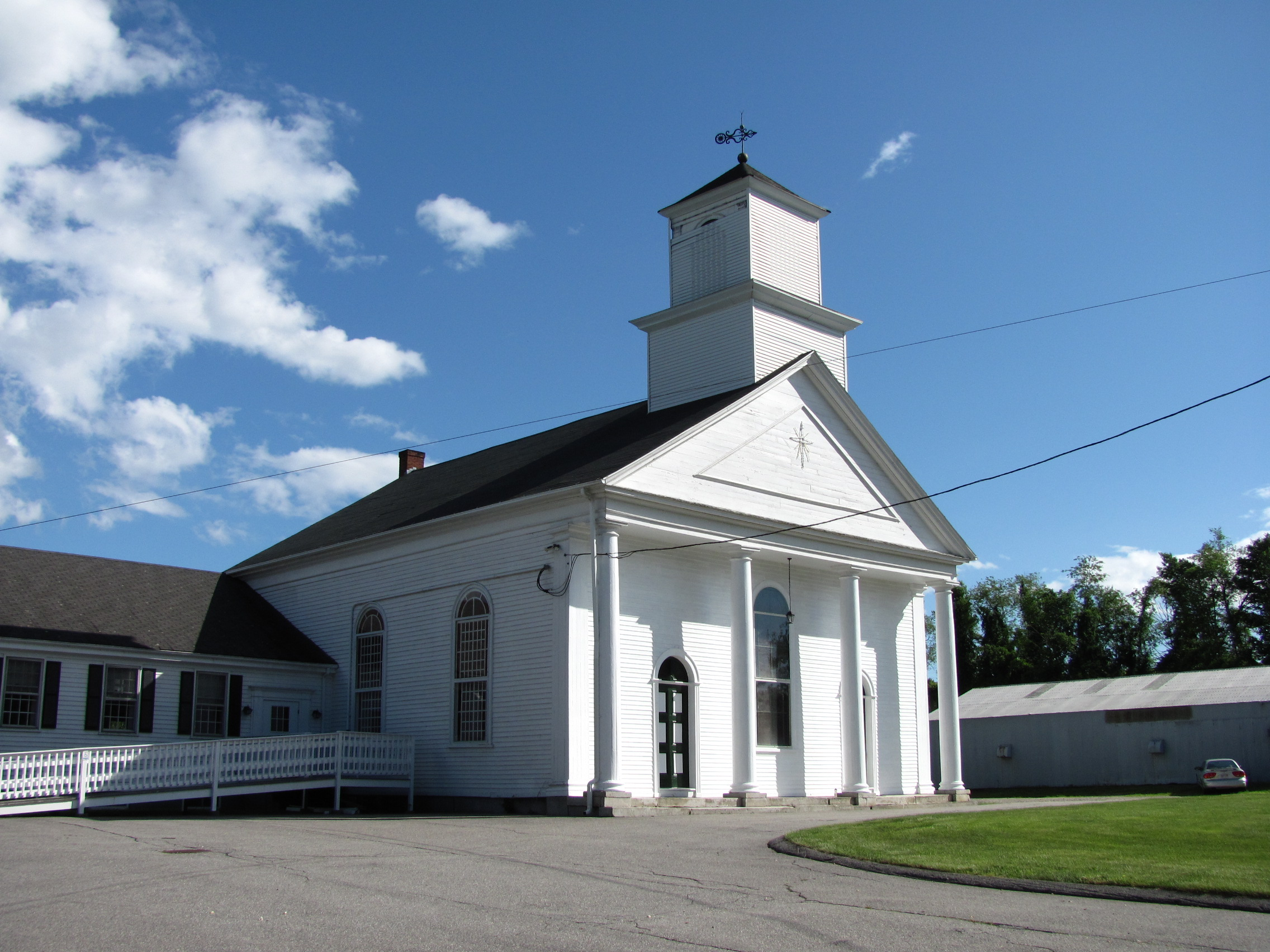
First Baptist Church of Sutton (2001)

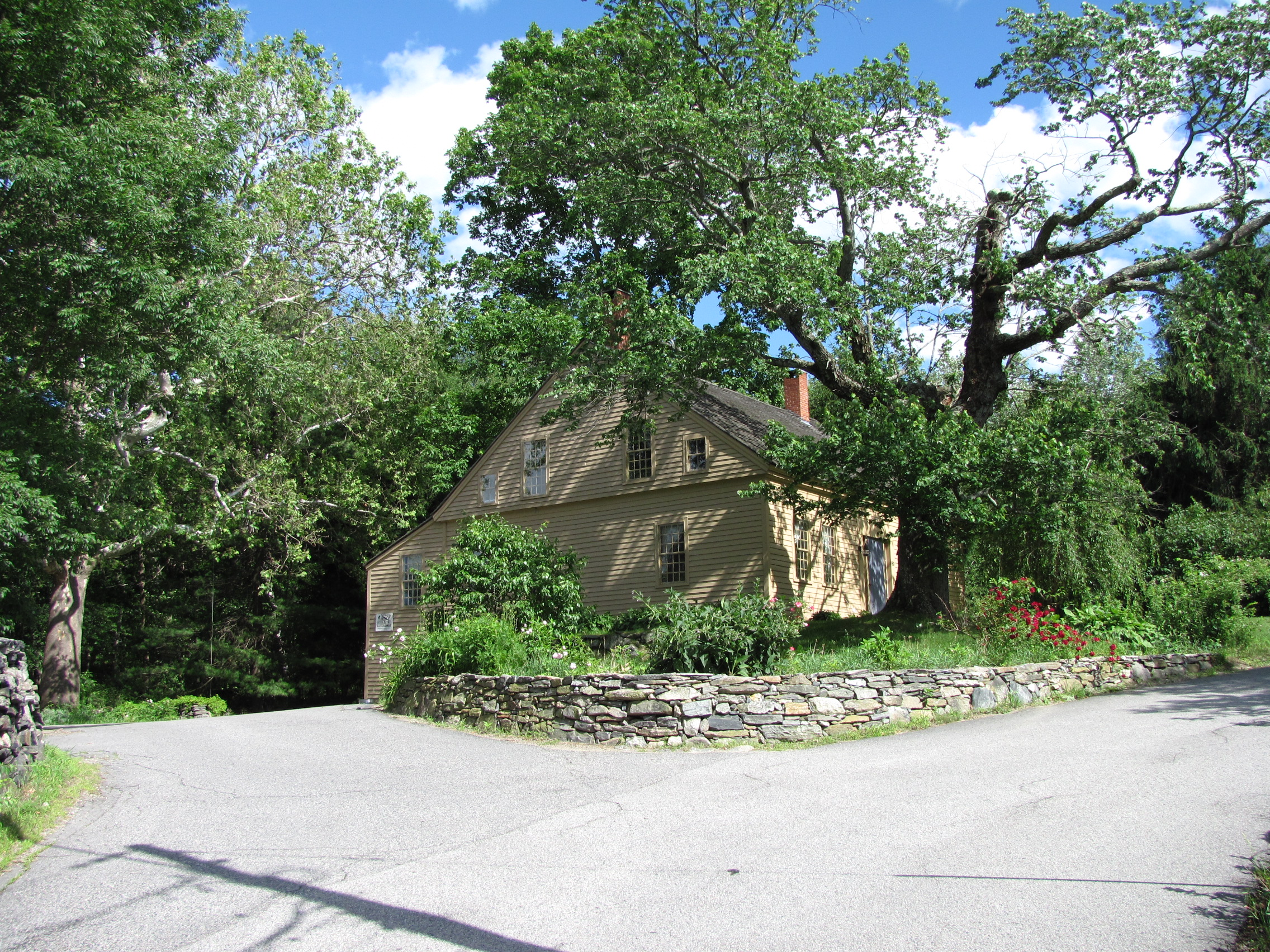
Freegrace Marble Farm Historic District (1989)

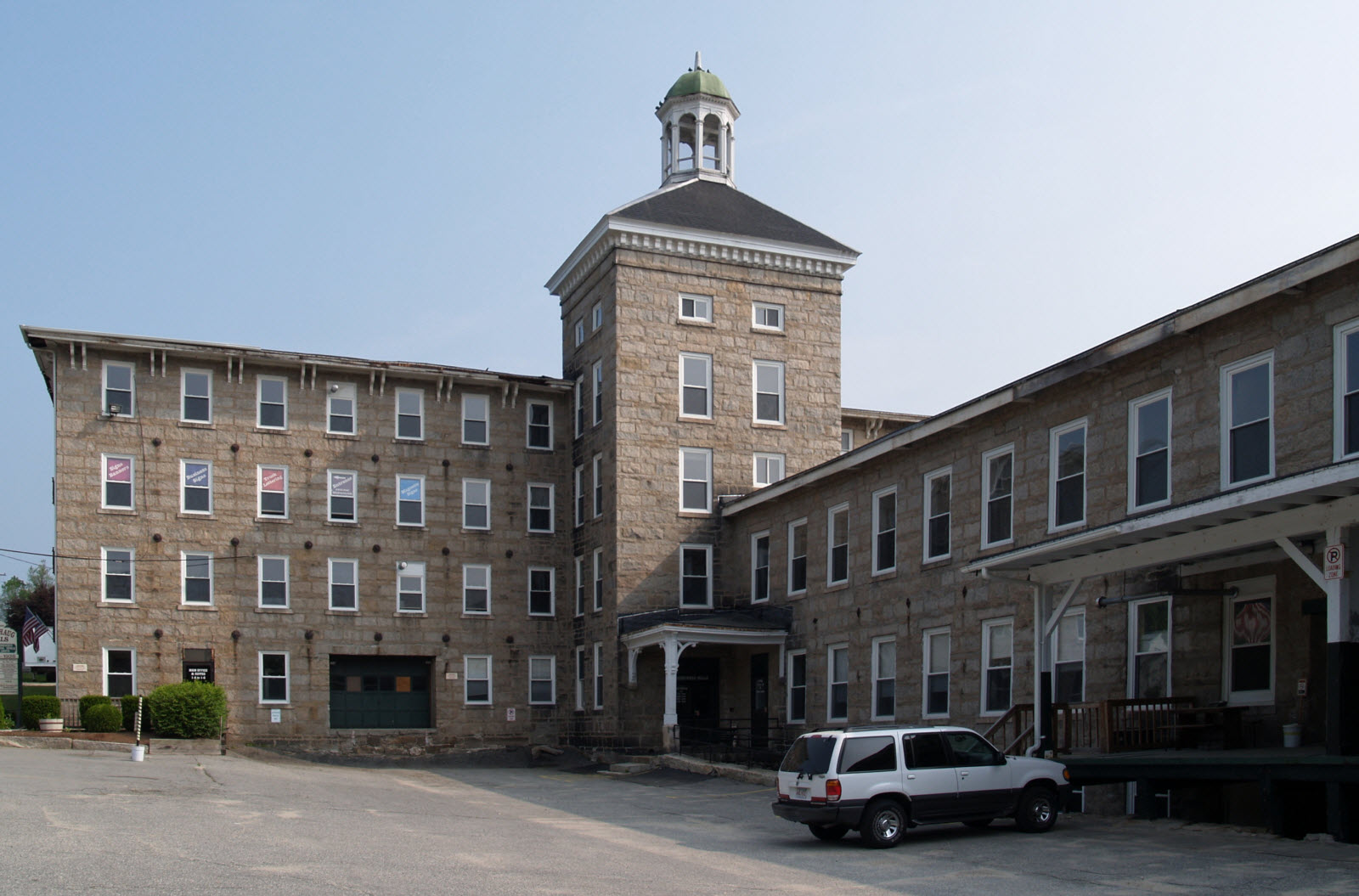
Manchaug Village Historic District (2018)

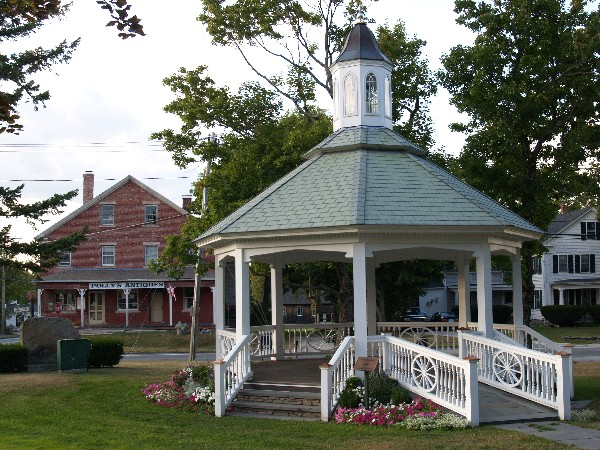
Sutton Center Historic District (2001)

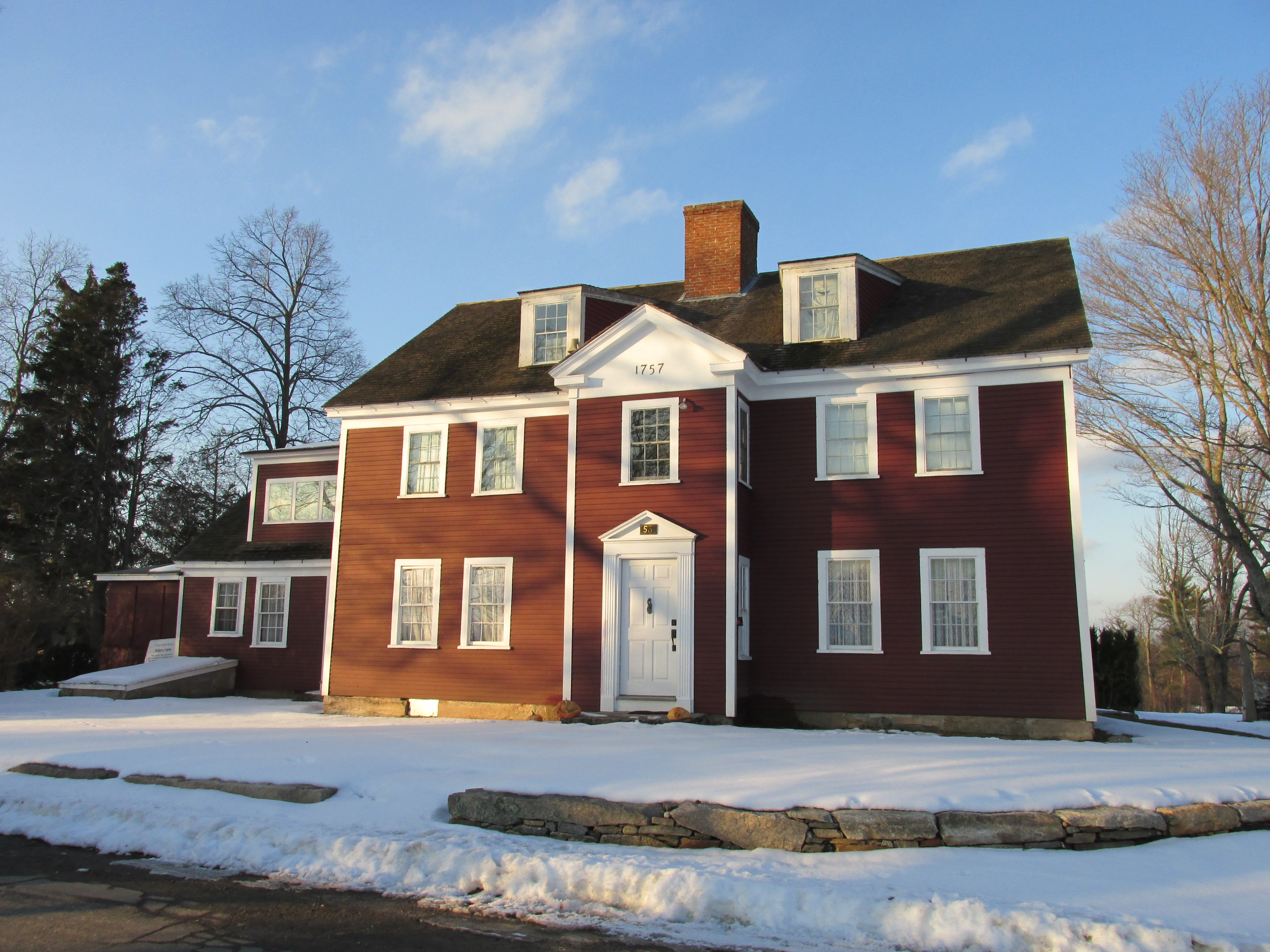
Waters Farm (1985)

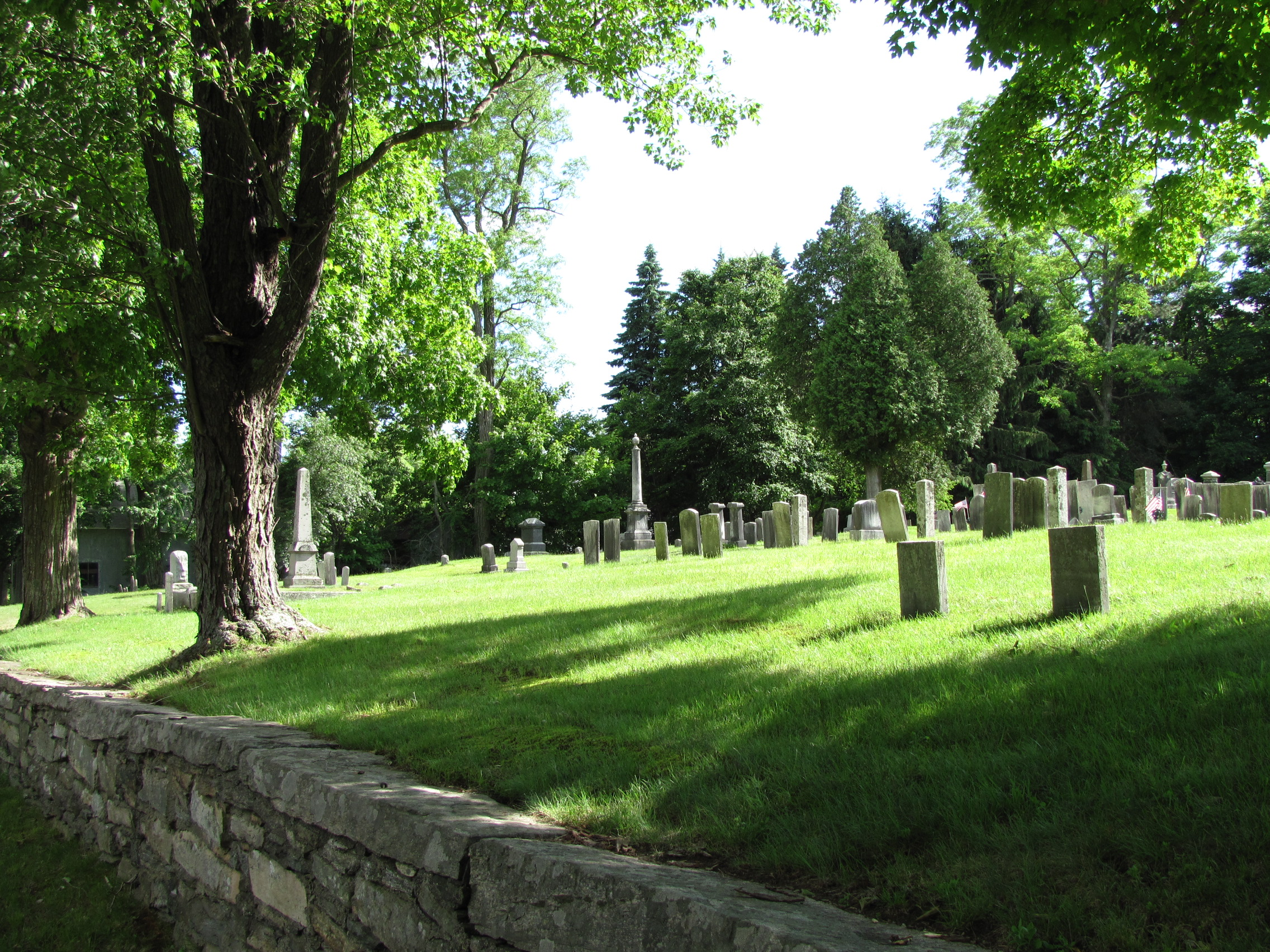
West Sutton Historic District (2001)

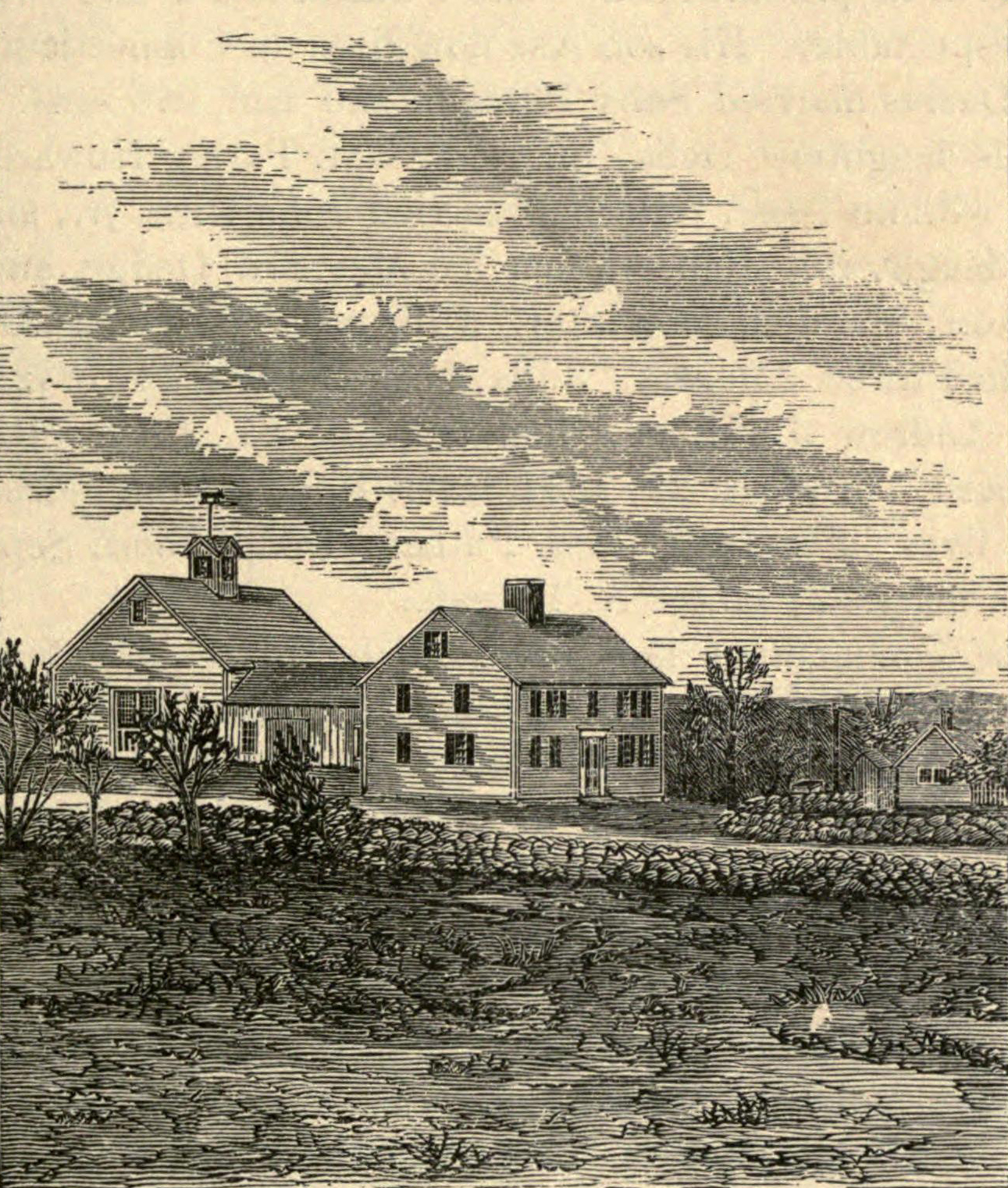
The Edward Putnam House still stands at 211 Putnam Hill Road in Sutton.

=== Climate ===
Climate data for Sutton, Massachusetts
| Month | Jan | Feb | Mar | Apr | May | Jun | Jul | Aug | Sep | Oct | Nov | Dec | Year |
|---|---|---|---|---|---|---|---|---|---|---|---|---|---|
| Record high °F (°C) | 64 (18) | 73 (23) | 83 (28) | 91 (33) | 95 (35) | 97 (36) | 98 (37) | 98 (37) | 95 (35) | 87 (31) | 79 (26) | 72 (22) | 98 (37) |
| Mean daily maximum °F (°C) | 34 (1) | 37 (3) | 45 (7) | 57 (14) | 68 (20) | 77 (25) | 81 (27) | 80 (27) | 73 (23) | 61 (16) | 51 (11) | 38 (3) | 59 (15) |
| Mean daily minimum °F (°C) | 12 (−11) | 15 (−9) | 23 (−5) | 34 (1) | 44 (7) | 54 (12) | 60 (16) | 58 (14) | 49 (9) | 37 (3) | 30 (−1) | 19 (−7) | 36 (2) |
| Record low °F (°C) | −28 (−33) | −22 (−30) | −16 (−27) | 2 (−17) | 25 (−4) | 34 (1) | 40 (4) | 34 (1) | 9 (−13) | 16 (−9) | −2 (−19) | −16 (−27) | −28 (−33) |
| Average precipitation inches (mm) | 3.76 (96) | 3.39 (86) | 4.45 (113) | 4.39 (112) | 3.73 (95) | 4.15 (105) | 4.30 (109) | 3.78 (96) | 3.88 (99) | 4.61 (117) | 4.49 (114) | 3.87 (98) | 48.8 (1,240) |

== Demographics ==
Historical population
| Year | Pop. | ±% |
|---|---|---|
| 1790 | 2,642 | — |
| 1850 | 2,595 | −1.8% |
| 1860 | 2,676 | +3.1% |
| 1870 | 2,699 | +0.9% |
| 1880 | 3,105 | +15.0% |
| 1890 | 3,180 | +2.4% |
| 1900 | 3,328 | +4.7% |
| 1910 | 3,078 | −7.5% |
| 1920 | 2,578 | −16.2% |
| 1930 | 2,147 | −16.7% |
| 1940 | 2,749 | +28.0% |
| 1950 | 3,102 | +12.8% |
| 1960 | 3,638 | +17.3% |
| 1970 | 4,590 | +26.2% |
| 1980 | 5,855 | +27.6% |
| 1990 | 6,824 | +16.5% |
| 2000 | 8,250 | +20.9% |
| 2010 | 8,963 | +8.6% |
| 2020 | 9,357 | +4.4% |
| 2023* | 9,436 | +0.8% |
* = population estimate. Source: United States census records and Population Estimates Program data.

As of the 2010 U.S. Census there were 8,963 people residing in Sutton. As of the census of 2000, there were 8,250 people, 2,811 households, and 2,282 families residing in the town. The population density was 254.8 inhabitants per square mile (98.4/km^{2}). There were 2,950 housing units at an average density of 91.1 per square mile (35.2/km^{2}). The racial makeup of the town was 98.18% White, 0.68% African American, 0.01% Native American, 0.59% Asian, 0.27% from other races, and 0.55% from two or more races. Hispanic or Latino of any race were 0.70% of the population.

There were 2,811 households, out of which 42.3% had children under the age of 18 living with them, 71.3% were married couples living together, 6.8% had a female householder with no husband present, and 18.8% were non-families. Of all households, 15.0% were made up of individuals, and 6.2% had someone living alone who was 65 years of age or older. The average household size was 2.93 and the average family size was 3.27.

In the town, the population was spread out, with 29.4% under the age of 18, 5.6% from 18 to 24, 31.5% from 25 to 44, 25.4% from 45 to 64, and 8.1% who were 65 years of age or older. The median age was 36 years. For every 100 females, there were 99.3 males. For every 100 females age 18 and over, there were 97.1 males.

The median income for a household in the town was $75,141, and the median income for a family was $81,000. Males had a median income of $53,482 versus $37,463 for females. The per capita income for the town was $27,490. About 3.4% of families and 4.4% of the population were below the poverty line, including 5.2% of those under age 18 and 6.8% of those age 65 or over.

== Government ==
Sutton has an open town meeting type government. The current Town Moderator is Ken Stuart, who served as a Selectman prior to his election in 2015.

The town government in Sutton consists of the Town Manager and the Board of Selectmen. The current Town Manager is Austin Cyganiewicz, and the current members of the Board of Selectmen are Jesse Limanek, Jonathan Anderson, James Ettamarna, Christine Watkins and Daniel Spengler.

The public services in Sutton include the police, fire, and highway departments. The Police Department is located at 489 Central Turnpike. The Fire Department has three stations, one in the center of town, one in the Wilkinsonville village, and one in the Manchaug village. The Sutton Highway Department is located at 25 Pleasant Valley Road.

== Education ==
Public schools in Sutton fall under the jurisdiction of Sutton Public School District. Sutton public schools consist of the Simonian Center for Early Learning, Sutton Elementary School, Sutton Middle School, and Sutton High School. Caitlin Paget currently serves as the district's superintendent.

The Sutton Free Library was established in 1876. In fiscal year 2008, the town of Sutton spent 0.7% ($165,982) of its budget on its public library—approximately $18 per person, per year ($23.72 adjusted for inflation to 2022).

== Notable people ==
- Eunice White Beecher, author
- Thomas Blanchard, inventor
- George B. Boomer, military officer
- Jennifer Callahan, politician
- Jonathan Chase, military officer
- Ryan Fattman, politician
- Cornelius Holland, politician
- Willard Francis Mallalieu, religious figure
- Alden March, physician
- Benjamin Marsh, founder of Sutton
- John D. McCrate, politician
- David Muradian, politician
- Jessica Phillips, actress
- Rufus Putnam, military officer. His house is depicted on the town seal of Sutton.
- Jonas Sibley, politician
- Solomon Sibley, politician
- Amos Singletary, politician
- Homer Sprague, military officer
- Asa Waters, industrialist
- Charles Andrew Whitney, businessman
- Vladas Zajančkauskas, war criminal
- Sean Burke, MLB Pitcher

== See also ==
- List of Preserve America Communities
