= First Baptist Church of Sutton =

Historic church in Massachusetts, United States

- First Baptist Church of Sutton (DBA) Legacy Church
- U.S. Historic district – Contributing property
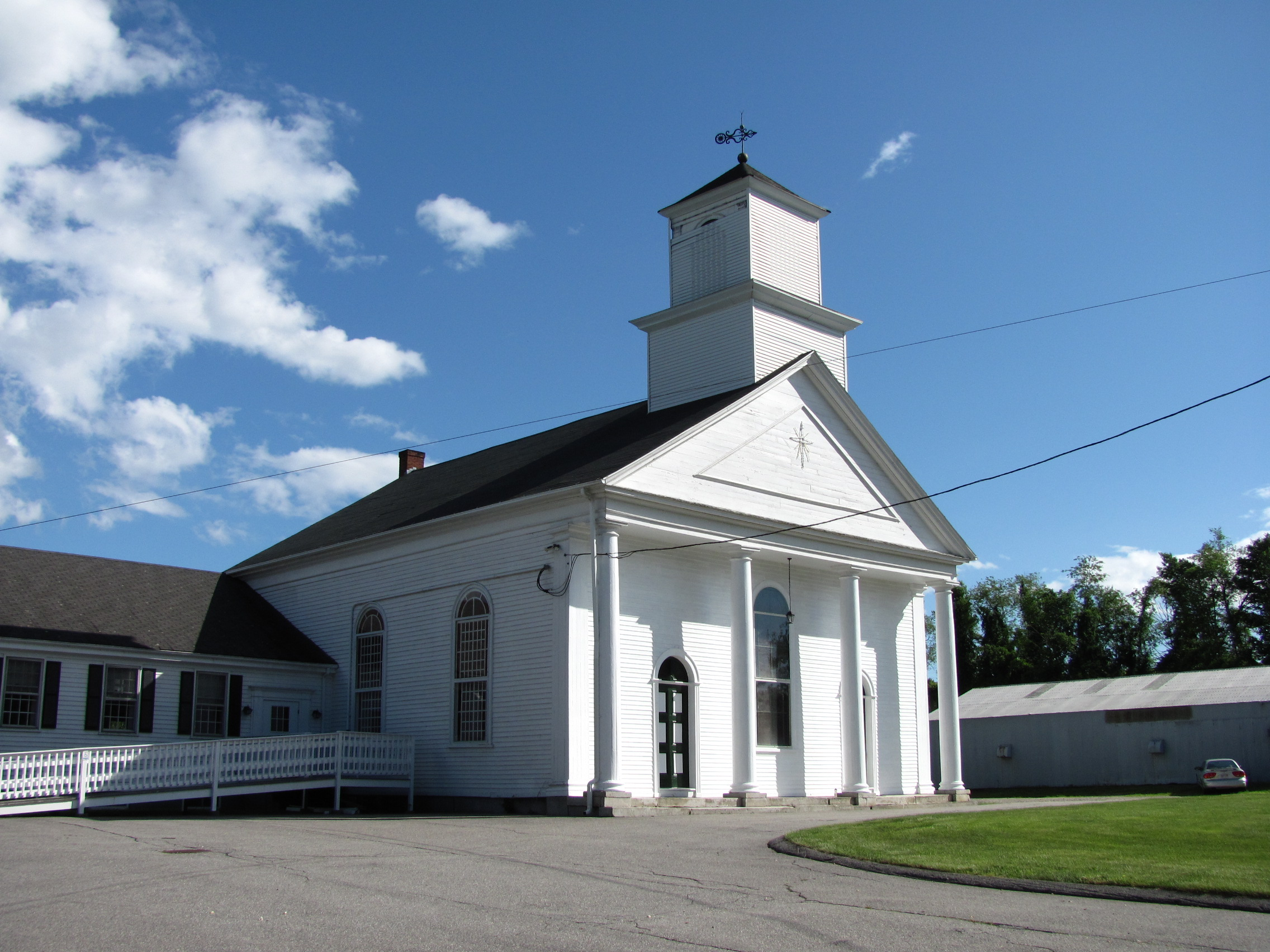
- Front 2010

- Location within Massachusetts Location within the United States
- Location: Sutton, MA
- Nearest city: Worcester, MA
- Coordinates: 42°7′2″N 71°48′11″W
- Built: 1829 (1959 Hall)
- Architect: Samuel Waters (Sanctuary) & Rae Johnson (Hall)
- Architectural style: Greek Revival
- Part of: West Sutton Historic District (ID01000871)
- Designated CP: August 8, 2001

First Baptist Church of Sutton is a Baptist church in the town of Sutton, Massachusetts and was founded on September 9, 1735, by the Reverend Benjamin Marsh one of the founding fathers of the town and Thomas Green. It is the fourth-oldest Baptist church in the Commonwealth of Massachusetts. The First Baptist Church of Sutton was organized in 1735. Except for ten years of inactivity during the war years from 1775 to 1785, there have been almost steady services of worship and activities carried on by the men and women of this church. The first structure (1750) was located just down the road where Sutton High School is now, the second (1792) was built on where the current police and fire departments are, and third structure was built on what is now Central Turnpike in 1829 and is part of the West Sutton Historic District with the Fellowship Hall added in 1959. The sanctuary building is in the Greek Revival style of the time. The church is tied to many of the historic families that have and still call Sutton home. Among the names we read the names of Putnam, Buard, Waters, Davis, Freeland, Brigham, King, Marble, Titus, Rich, Dana, Merriam, Lamb, Sibley, Shaw, Moore, Burdon, Luther, Whittier, Plummer, Wallace, Leonard. First Baptist Church is part of the North American Missions Board Revitalize and Replant effort in New England stopping the 17 churches that close every week in America. Through the years the church has been also known through the town and region as Legacy Church, First Baptist Sutton, West Sutton Baptist Church, Sutton Baptist Church, Baptist Meetinghouse, and its original founding name by Rev. Marsh, The Frontier Church.

== History ==
=== 1700s ===
The original Baptist Church in Sutton was organized on September 19, 1735. James Bound had begun a group of Baptists meeting in the town prior to the date, and encouraged the organization of a church in the town. In 1737, Benjamin Marsh and Thomas Green were both ordained as co-pastors of the church. Green would leave with a group to Leicester to start a Baptist church there, in the Rochdale village, today known as Greenville Baptist Church. Marsh would go on to lead the First Baptist for over 40 years (still the longest tenure), seeing the church grow in life and vigor from the events of the Great Awakening. The first building was erected in 1750, at the corner of Hutchinson and Boston Roads. The second was built on Freeland Hill, this building had no steeple or bell. It was later moved to Braman Village and is now between the West Milbury and Sutton Roads and serves as the home of the Sutton Historical Society. Shortly after Rev. Marsh's passing, the church was partially dissolved due to the wars in America, but the members reorganized the church in 1785 and elder Ebenezer Lamson was chosen as the new pastor until he was voted out following his admission in beliefs of teachings that were against orthodox theology. In 1792, Rev. William Batchellor who was the pastor of First Baptist, organized the Second Baptist Church/Manchaug Baptist Church in South Sutton (the building was the original second structure of First Baptist and moved for their use in 1842) which today is the Historical Society's.

=== 1800s ===
The church was active during the 100-year anniversary celebrations of the founding of Sutton. Under Rev. Samuel Waters the church grew to over 100 people and was no longer able to fit in the second building for one service. The congregation voted to and raised money to build their third and the current sanctuary building which would house 250 people total and included a balcony/choir loft. The present edifice was built in 1829 in a more central location in West Sutton. The property was purchased because George Whitefield is said to have spoken on the grounds during a week in Sutton in April 1745. It was dedicated on Sept. 16, 1830. Hand-hewn lumber was used for the Greek Revival temple front of the structure was a form widely employed by congregations of all denominations in the early to mid decades of the 19th century. The steeple was of the Christopher Wren type. The lovely old bell was cast in Medway, Mass. by G.H. Holbrook in 1829, one of the first church bells to be cast in the United States. The old choir loft was closed and pew doors were taken off in the 1890s, only one of these pews from the original 1829 building remains in the enclosed loft leading up to the bell tower. The 1800s would see short terms from a number of pastors, many of whom were older and near retirement, with a few dying during their term as pastor. The Civil War would also play havoc on the pastoral terms as three men would pastor the church at about the same time because of service commitments to the Union Army. The church would be closed off and on for the years of the war because of this, with the elders leading services and other functions of the church.

=== 1900s ===
The church during the 1904 Bi-centennial celebrations of Sutton's founding had Rev. Arthur Davis represent the church at all the festivities and functions. Several houses in West Sutton were used as a parsonage until, in 1915, the Church purchased a large house nearby. The one hundredth anniversary of the building of the church was celebrated, in 1929. A cellar was dug under the church, affording space for a furnace, and the two big wood stoves were removed. The interior was redecorated. Electric lights were installed in memory of Mr. C.S. Jones, who had been a member of the Men's Sunday School Class, known as the "Knights of the Wheel." A Woman's Community Organization, known as "The Hillside Club," was organized in 1906 to aid this church financially and to be of benefit to the community, and the members had always been ready and willing to raise extra funds when needed. In 1950, the club spent $100 beautifying the Community Hall and $400 towards the redecoration expenses. A Christian Endeavor Society was first formed in the 1890s, but later discontinued — until 1936 when it was revived. It has been a very vital and important part in the life of the church and the community, carrying on many worthwhile projects. Among the improvements made at this time were a new choir section made to the right of the stage area. New pews were bought for this project, but because they didn't match the interior of the church, this caused some issues with older families of the church. a maroon velveteen curtain was placed in the area to cover this up. They held religious services Sunday evenings as well as mornings at this time. The church lost several tiers of its steeple in the 1938 hurricane but otherwise looks much as it did in the engraving in the original town history. The horse sheds to the west of the building were torn down. The 1938 hurricane blew down the beautiful Christopher Wren-type steeple, damaging other parts of the building. In 1938, modern improvements were introduced. The men of the parish capped over the second section of the steeple and a fund has been started to build a new spire. In 1938, the Church felt the need for a larger place in which to hold activities of different kinds. The large two-story building next door was bought for a parish house and community hall for the use of the church and community. This building had been, for many years, a real "old time" country store and post office. It is being improved and modernized. The first well, drilled in 1949, supplied the church, parish hall and parsonage. A new organ was given to the church by the Hillside Club, in 1910, and this was electrified, in 1948, through the efforts of the Club and Choir. In 1951, The very important project of re-plastering and painting the whole interior of the Church was undertaken, in 1950. Money had been earned with auctions, suppers, movies and a Bazaar. A contractor was hired, but, in order to save money, the men and women of the Church and community cleaned and painted the pews and floor. The paint was donated by members of the Church. In removing old paint from the pews, it was found that the trim is solid mahogany. This trim restored, gives the white pews their original beauty. A beautiful maroon velveteen Choir Curtain, Dossal Curtain and draperies to match at the two south windows are now installed. In 1950, there were sixty-three members. A new hall has been added to the east side in 1959 to accommodate the growing congregation with classroom space under it with access to the 2.5 acres of land behind the structures. In the late 1990s the sanctuary was refurbished again and the balcony area was covered up as well as four pew areas reducing the capacity to about 180 to this day.

=== 2000s ===
The church had been affiliated with the Triennial Convention and American Baptist but in 2003 joined the Southern Baptist Convention, through the Baptist Convention of New England, when the Rev. Edward Pentland and church leadership voted to join a more conservative denomination. The back of the church has a baseball field and basketball court that was in use by the town for many years until the town built new town ball fields and a soccer field complex on Central Turnpike. In 2004 the church replaced their rotting wooden sign with a newer lighted one and message board. The fellowship hall also was used as a meeting space for the local gun club, police and fire unions, flower club, Alcoholics Anonymous, and other groups in Sutton. Rev. Pentland retired in June 2017, having the church in April 2017, call Rev. Donald J. McKinnon to become its new pastor. 2017 saw the church begin a web and social media presence by launching its own website, Facebook, Twitter, and Instagram pages, as well as begin the #ForSutton hashtag.

The church recently rejoined Sutton's Chain of Lights Christmas celebrations.

== Pastors ==
1. * Benjamin Marsh, 1735–1775 (40 Years)
2. * Thomas Green, 1735–1737 (2 Years)
3. * Ebenezer Lamson, 1785–1794 (9 Years)
4. * William Batchellor, 1794–1799 (5 Years)
5. * Samuel Waters, 1799–1825 (26 Years)
6. * Moses Harrington, 1825–1831 (6 Years)
7. * John Walker, 1831–1836 (5 years)
8. * L. B. Cole, 1836–1837 (1 Year)
9. * Charles H. Peabody, 1837–1840 (3 Years)
10. * Otis Converse, 1840–1842 (2 Years)
11. * Samuel Richards, 1842–1843 (1 Year)
12. * George Deland, 1843–1846 (3 Years)
13. * Job B. Boomer, 1846–1849 (3 Years)
14. * G. W. Benton, 1849–1850 (1 Year)
15. * J. Thayer, 1850–1852 (2 Years)
16. * Lorenzo O. Lovell, 1852–1859 (7 Years)
17. * O. Crane, 1859–1860 (1 Year)
18. * J. D. Donovan, 1860–1862 (2 Years)
19. * David Avery, 1862–1863 (1 Year)
20. * C. L. Baker, 1863–1864 (1 Year)
21. * J. Barber, 1864–1865 (1 Year)
22. * Gilman Stone, 1865–1868 (3 Years)
23. * N. Medbury, 1868–1869 (1 Year)
24. * A. E. Battlle, 1869–1872 (4 Years)
25. * J. H. Tilton, 1871–1873 (2 Years)
26. * E. J. Stevens, 1872–1873 (1 Year)
27. * Charles F. Myers, 1873–1876 (3 Years)
28. * E. J. Stevens, 1876–1877 (1 Year)
29. * Joel P. Chapin, 1877–1880 (3 Years)
30. * Charles Newhall, 1880–1885 (5 Years)
31. * Albert Green, 1885–1888 (3 Years)
32. * Benjamin Tuck, 1888–1891 (3 Years)
33. * William D. MacKinnon, 1892–1897 (5 Years)
34. * Charles B. Williams, 1897–1900 (3 Years)
35. * Fred F. Thayer, 1900–1902 (2 Years)
36. * Leopold Sharf, 1901–1903 (2 Years)
37. * Arthur Davis, 1903–1906 (3 Years)
38. * Joseph Joy Theakston, 1906–1910 (4 Years)
39. * Allan H. Bissell, 1910–1912 (2 Years)
40. * Frederick Webb, 1912–1915 (3 Years)
41. * O.D. Thomas, 1915–1916 (1 Year)
42. * H.Y. Vinal, 1916–1920 (4 Years)
43. * J.D. Matthews, 1920–1922 (2 Years)
44. * Leonard Smith, 1922–1925 (3 Years)
45. * Sydney Cahoon, 1925-1926 (1 Year)
46. * A.C. Krane, 1926–1927 (1 Year)
47. * Kenneth Hatch, 1927–1928 (1 Year)
48. * Henry Schwab, 1928–1936 (8 Years)
49. * Fred Bopp, 1936–1937 (1 Year)
50. * Vernon D. Byron, 1937–1942 (5 Years)
51. * Lee L. Burton, 1942–1944 (2 Years)
52. * Warren C. Young, 1944–1947 (3 Years)
53. * Lewis F. Hall, 1947–1954 (7 Years)
54. * Arthur Darby, 1954–1962 (8 Years)
55. * John Olson, 1962–1965 (3 Years)
56. * Everett Nickerson, 1965–1967 (2 Years)
57. * Willard Smith, 1968–1969 (1+ Years)
58. * C. Vaughn Overman 1969–1972 (3 Years)
59. * Charles Pentland, 1969–82 (13 Years)
60. * Lloyd Yeagle, 1982–1992 (9 years)
61. * S.H. Hartman, 1992–1997 (5 Years)
62. * Edward J. Pentland, 1997–2017 (20 Years)
63. * Donald J. McKinnon, 2017–

thumb

== Gallery ==
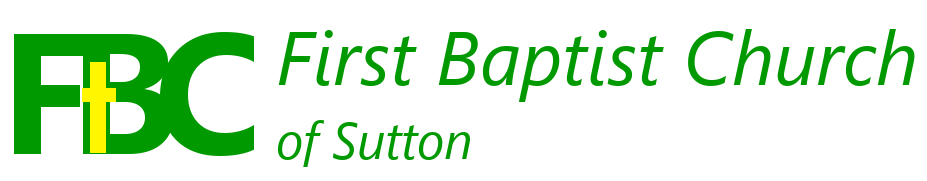

== See also ==
Official Website
