= Edward Putnam House =

Coordinates: 42°07′07″N 71°46′17″W

The Putnam House is a colonial home at 211 Putnam Hill Road, Sutton, Massachusetts built in 1737.

== History ==
The two-story, wood-frame, post-and-beam house sits on top of Putnam Hill. It was built by Edward Putnam (1710-1800) who came to Sutton in 1737 and established a 100-acre farm there. Edward Putnam was a first cousin of Rufus Putnam and a first cousin once removed of Israel Putnam, both of whom were generals in the American Revolutionary War.

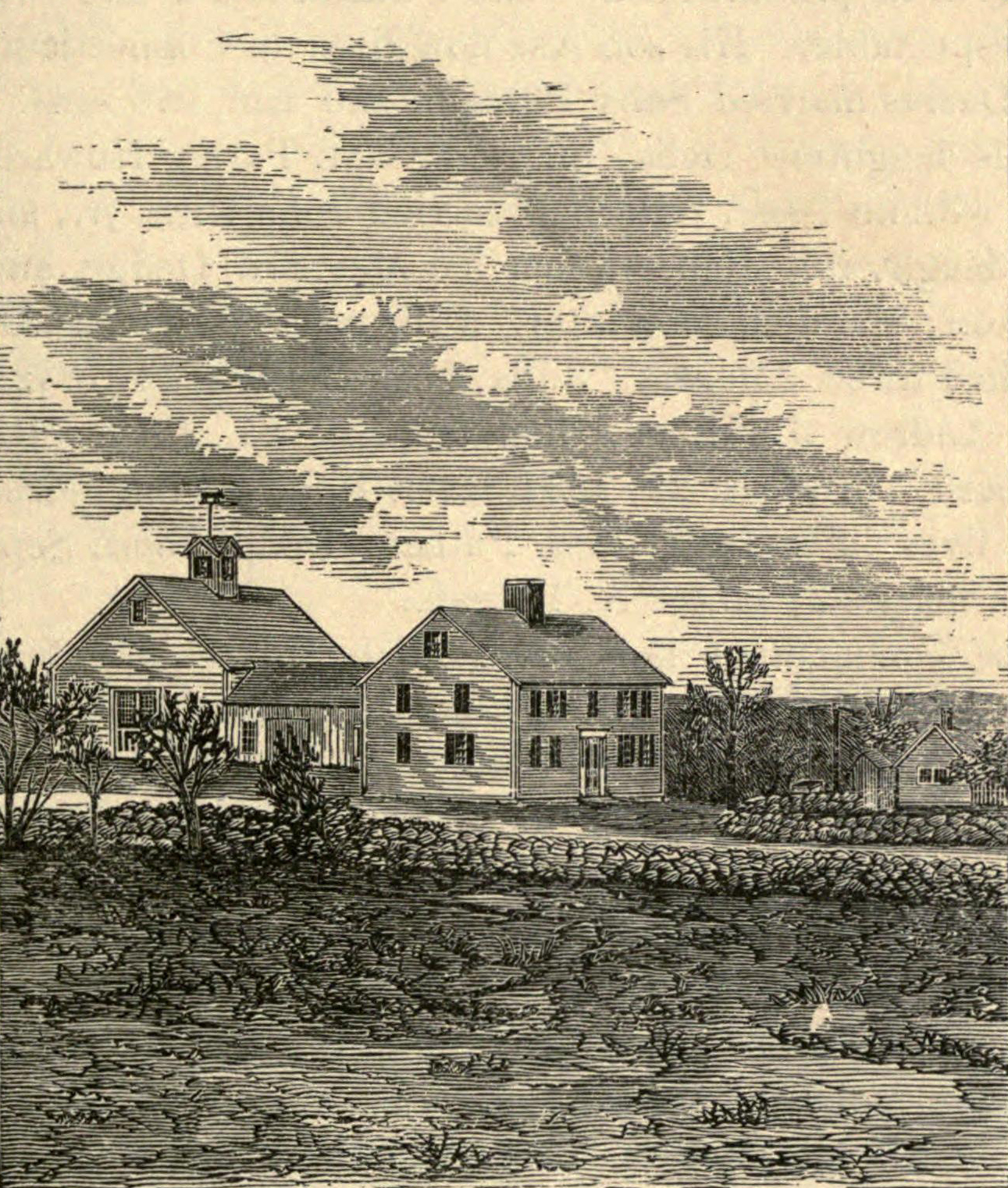
The Putnam House still stands at 211 Putnam Hill Road, Sutton, Massachusetts.

The house has a large central chimney, and a triple-run staircase which circumscribes the oven and chimney. The house has five fireplaces, five windows in each room, and five trees planted in front of the house to break westerly winds. The farm's large barn is close to the house and situated to break northeasterly winds.

What is now the breakfast room was previously known as the death room. After a family member's death, caskets were brought through the door of this room because the design of the house made it almost impossible to navigate caskets through the front door.

Edward and Ruth Putnam had 12 children, all but one of whom were born in the house. The home remained in the Putnam family for the next 200 years. The current owners are operating the house as a historic B&B.
