= Eunice White Beecher =

American writer

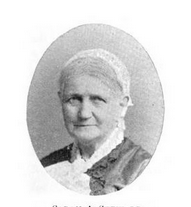
- Born: Eunice White Bullard; August 26, 1812; West Sutton, Massachusetts, U.S.
- Died: March 8, 1897 (aged 84); Stamford, Connecticut, U.S.
- Occupation: Author
- Spouse: Henry Ward Beecher
- Relatives: Dr. Artemas Bullard
- Writing career
- Pen name: A Minister's Wife
- Notable work: From Dawn to Daylight: A Simple Story of a Western Home

Eunice White Beecher (née Bullard; pen name, A Minister's Wife; August 26, 1812 – March 8, 1897) was a United States author.

== Biography ==
Eunice White Bullard born in West Sutton, Massachusetts, August 26, 1812. She was the daughter of Dr. Artemas Bullard and Lucy Maria White, and was educated in Hadley, Massachusetts. When Henry Ward Beecher, a clergyman, settled in his pastorate in Lawrenceburg, Indiana, in 1837, he returned east to marry Eunice, having been engaged to her for over seven years.

Beecher was a contributor, chiefly on domestic subjects, to various periodicals, and some of her articles were published in book form. During a long and tedious illness in her earlier married life, she wrote a series of reminiscences of her first years as a minister's wife, afterward published with the title From Dawn to Daylight: A Simple Story of a Western Home (1859) under the pen name of 'A Minister's Wife'. She also published Motherly Talks with Young Housekeepers (New York, 1873), Letters from Florida (1878), All Around the House; or, How to Make Homes Happy (1878), and Home (1883).

She died in Stamford, Connecticut, March 8, 1897.
