= Freegrace Marble Farm Historic District =

Historic district in Massachusetts, United States

- U.S. National Register of Historic Places
- U.S. Historic district
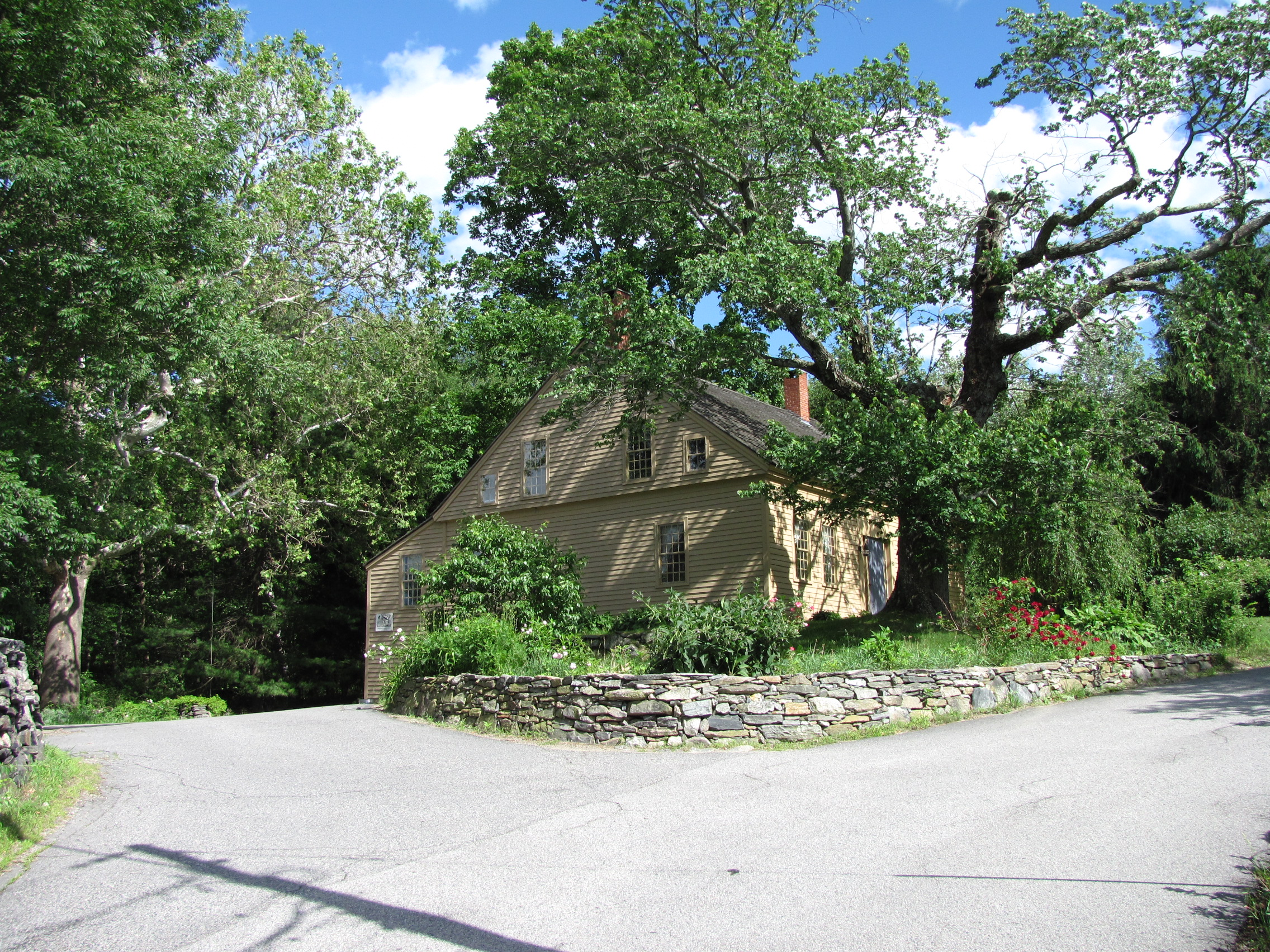
- Freegrace Marble Farm

- Location within Massachusetts Location within the United States
- Location: 80 Burbank Road, Sutton, Massachusetts
- Coordinates: 42°9′44″N 71°45′2″W
- Area: 63 acres (25 ha)
- NRHP reference No.: 89001967
- Added to NRHP: November 13, 1989

The Freegrace Marble Farm Historic District encompasses a historic farmstead in Sutton, Massachusetts. Although most of its buildings date to the 19th century, the farm has retained the form of a typical 18th-century farm, including a substantial portion of the land granted in 1717 to Freegrace Marble, one of Sutton's earliest colonial settlers. The property was listed on the National Register of Historic Places in 1989.

== Description and history ==
The Freegrace Marble Farm is located in a rural area of northern Sutton, its complex of buildings located at the junction of Burbank and Sibley Roads. The farm covers about 63 acres (25 ha), which is divided roughly equally between open land (for meadows and intensive agriculture), and woodlands. Stone walls line many elements of the property, with particularly well-formed ones lining the road near the farmstead. A family cemetery is located near the northern edge of the property; although its oldest readable marker is dated 1786, it is known to include the grave of the farm's founder Freegrace Marble, who died in 1775. The farm complex consists of a 1-1/2 story Cape style plank-framed house, set on the south side of the street junction. Across the street to the north stands a cluster of two barns and a toolshed.

The area that is now Sutton was settled by English colonists in the 1710s, the land having been purchased from the Nipmuc Indians in 1704. Freegrace Marble was one of thirty settlers to arrive in the new community in 1717, and settled on a farm of more than 250 acres (100 ha). The core of his holding, including his original farmhouse (no longer extant, believed to stand west of the present house), passed to his son Malachi upon his death in 1775. Malachi built the present house, in which he raised twelve children. The core of the farm remained in the hands of Marble descendants until 1895. Its form, with the farm buildings across the road from the house, is a typical 18th-century form, differing from the 19th-century connected farmstead, where the house is connected to the barn via a series of ells.

== See also ==
- National Register of Historic Places listings in Worcester County, Massachusetts
