= Manchaug Village Historic District =

Historic district in Massachusetts, United States

- U.S. National Register of Historic Places
- U.S. Historic district
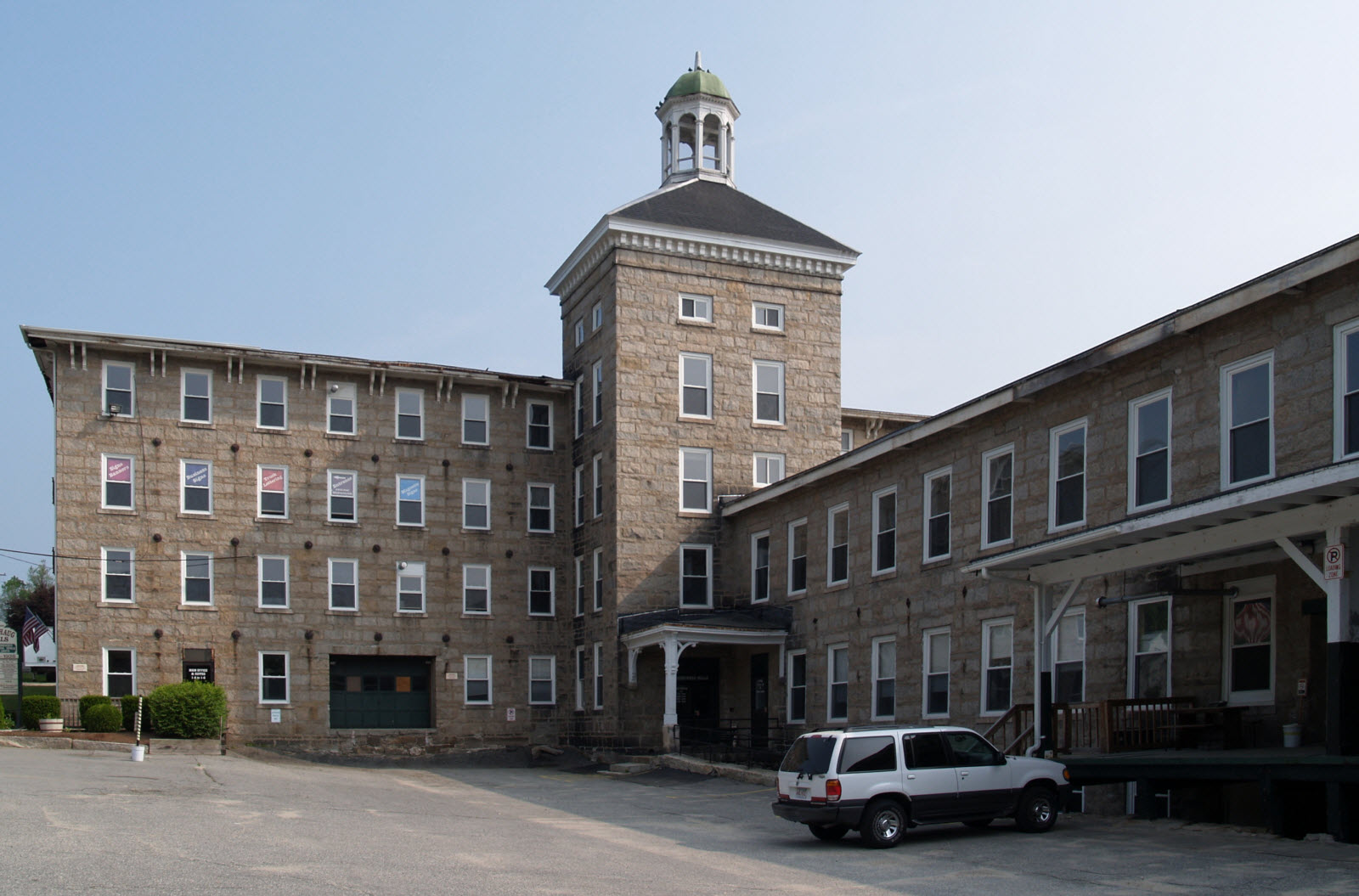
- Manchaug's stone mill

- Location within Massachusetts Location within the United States
- Location: Roughly bounded by Putnam Hill, Whitins, Morse, Mumford & Manchaug Rds. Ledge, Main, 3rd & Maple Sts., Stevens Pond, Sutton, Massachusetts
- Coordinates: 42°5′39″N 71°44′50″W
- Architectural style: Federal, Greek Revival, Italianate
- NRHP reference No.: 100002026
- Added to NRHP: January 16, 2018

The Manchaug Village Historic District is a historic district encompassing the 19th century industrial village center of Manchaug in Sutton, Massachusetts. Developed in the 1820s around textile mills on the Mumford River, it was the largest industrial area in Sutton, with at least three mill complexes in operation. The district is centered on the junction of Main Street with Manchaug, Putnam Hill, and Whitins Roads.

== Name ==
Manchaug was a praying town for Nipmuc people, established by the Massachusetts Bay Colony in the 1670s in the area that later became Oxford, Massachusetts. Though the praying town became depopulated after King Phillip’s War, and the land was sold to investors, its name persisted in the name of Manchaug Pond. In the 19th century the Manchaug Company took its name from the pond, which formed the headwaters for the mill complex the company constructed, and the company town was known as Manchaug Village.

== Description and History ==
The area that became Manchaug Village was a rural agricultural area until the early 19th century. The only industry of note on the Mumford River was a trip hammer known to be in operation in 1795. In 1826, investors from Rhode Island began purchasing water privileges and land along the river for the development of textile mills. The stone mill standing at 9 Main Street was built in that, and was soon followed by housing for mill workers. The mills where significantly expanded in the 1850s and 1860s, when the dam impounding Stevens Pond was built, followed by new mills and a major tract of mill housing. The mills flourished until after World War I, and closed in 1921; the company-owned housing was sold off after bankruptcy in 1927.

The historic district is centered on the junction of Main Street with Manchaug, Putnam Hill, and Whitins Roads. To the north, west, and south of this junction stand collections of mills, mill sites, and worker housing. The surviving mill buildings are typically large stone structures, while the housing units a multifamily wood-frame dwellings with gabled roofs. The mill operators also built some single-family housing, for supervisory and specialized technical personnel. The Greek Revival Manchaug Baptist Church is one of the buildings not related directly to the mills; it was built in 1842 to serve the workers.

== See also ==
- National Register of Historic Places listings in Worcester County, Massachusetts
