= Vaillancourt Folk Art =

- Type: Private
- Industry: Retail, Manufacturing, Wholesale, Collectibles
- Founded: 1984
- Headquarters: Sutton, Massachusetts, USA
- Area served: North America and Europe
- Key people: Gary Vaillancourt, Judi Vaillancourt, Luke M. Vaillancourt
- Products: Chalkware, glass ornaments, ceramic and acrylic goods, figurines, home decor
- Number of employees: 20

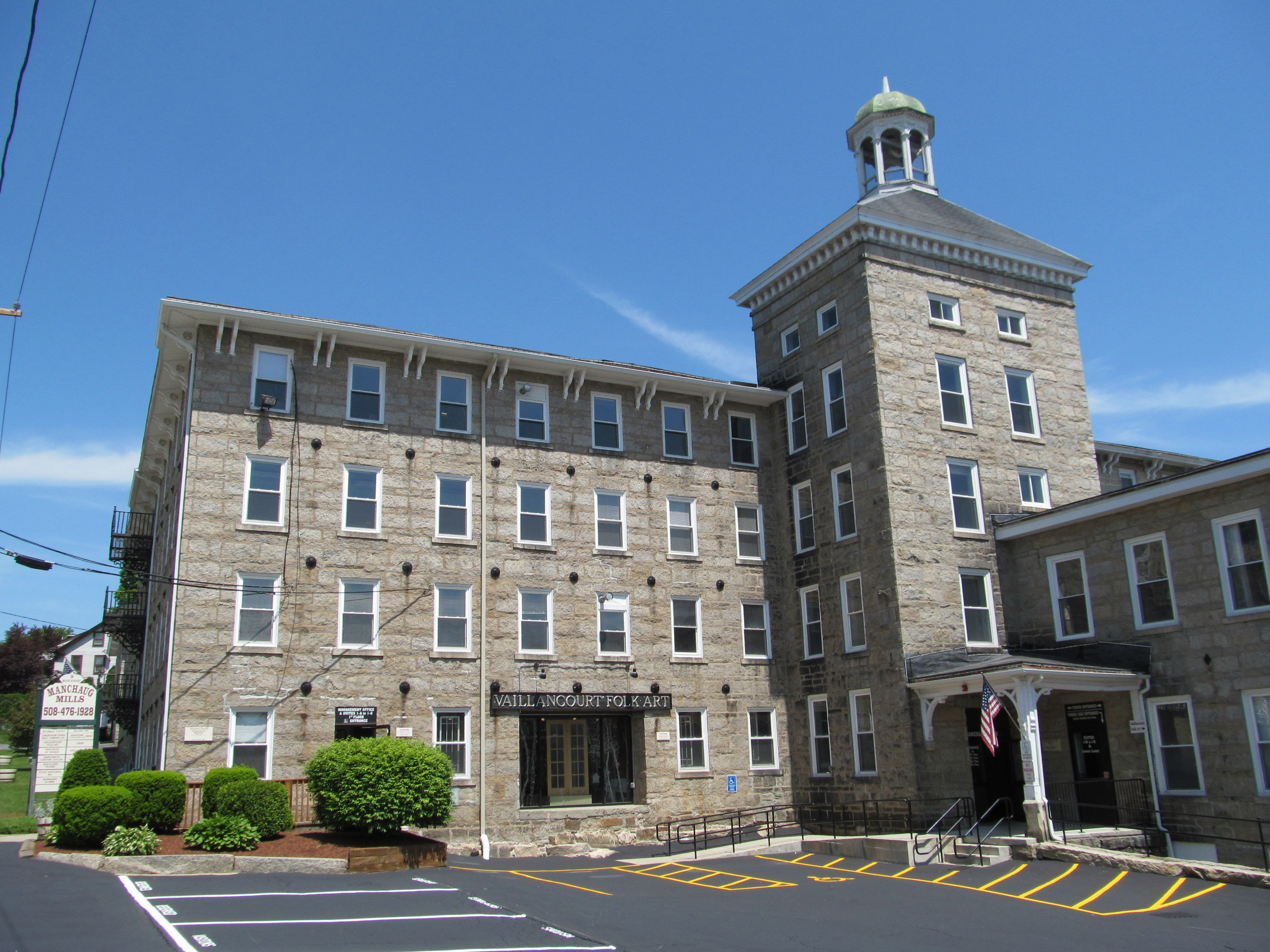
Vaillancourt Folk Art at Manchaug Mills

Vaillancourt Folk Art (VFA) is an American manufacturer, wholesaler, and retailer of Christmas collectibles based in Sutton, Massachusetts. Founded in 1984 by Gary and Judi Vaillancourt, the company is known for hand-painted chalkware figures, which Judi Vaillancourt makes by casting a plaster-like material in antique confectionery molds.

The business began as a store selling a range of holiday and folk art items under the name Vaillancourt Folk Art & Friends. After relocating in 2007, it shortened its name and concentrated on its own chalkware and glass ornament lines, which have been sold through retailers in the United States, Canada, and Europe.

The company's studio is also a visitor attraction. In 2009 the Massachusetts Office of Travel and Tourism listed it among six "behind-the-scenes" places to visit, and in 2010 the Great Places in Massachusetts Commission included it in its list of 1,000 places to visit in the state.

== History ==
=== Founding (1984–1988) ===
Gary Vaillancourt and his wife Judi founded the company in 1984, after Gary gave Judi three antique chocolate molds for Christmas. Judi, an illustrator, first filled the molds with chocolate and later with beeswax, before developing a process for casting solid chalkware figures. The business initially operated as Vaillancourt Folk Art & Friends, with Judi as its sole designer and production artist. Early on, the couple were invited to take part in a folk art show by Chicago-based promoter Judy Marks, who had learned of them through an article on historical reproductions in Early American Life.

In 1985 Gary left his position as president of Mitchell Management Systems to work in the business full-time. Production moved into the basement of the couple's home, and by the end of that year the company had about 15 employees. In 1986 it had 18 workers on two shifts during the Christmas season.

In 1987 the company acquired an 1820s farmhouse and moved its 20-person production team to the second floor. The first floor became a retail store selling the company's chalkware alongside work by American folk artists whom the Vaillancourts had met at art and craft shows.

=== Wholesale and licensing (1989–2006) ===
Gorham Silver was the first manufacturer to license Judi Vaillancourt's designs, producing ornaments in Taiwan under the name "Vaillancourt Folk Art for Gorham" in 1986. The company began wholesale distribution in 1989, and in 1992 Nordstrom became the first department store to carry its chalkware and ornaments. In 1994 the designs were licensed to Possible Dreams for that company's Clothtique line of Santa figures.

In 1991 the company began producing an annual "Starlight Santa" to benefit the Starlight Children's Foundation (see Philanthropy). In 1995 Judi Vaillancourt designed a line of English creamware Christmas dinnerware, and the company held its first annual Collector's Weekend. In 1996 her figurine designs were first produced as glass ornaments, made in Lauscha, Germany; ornament production later moved to Poland. The company launched an e-commerce website in 1998.

In a 2017 interview, Gary Vaillancourt said that about 135 American companies made Christmas figures in 1985, compared with about half a dozen by 2017. The company's sales increased after the September 11 attacks, which it attributed to demand for American-made goods. Its patriotic figurines and its "American Christmas Series", produced with the American Christmas companies Byers' Choice and the Lynn Haney Collection, sold well in that period. Vaillancourt has been described as one of the few remaining companies in the United States still designing such figures by hand, and newspaper coverage has described its limited-edition figures as pieces intended to be handed down as heirlooms.

=== Manchaug Mills (2007–2017) ===
In 2007 the company moved into a 10,000-square-foot (930 m^{2}) space in the 19th-century Manchaug Mills in the Sutton village of Manchaug. The move provided room for its collection of more than 3,000 antique confectionery molds, some dating to about 1850, which has been described as one of the largest known private collections of its kind in the United States. According to the Telegram & Gazette, the United States Postal Service adjusted its ZIP Code boundaries so that the company could keep a Sutton address rather than use Manchaug's separate ZIP Code.

With the move, the company dropped "& Friends" from its name, stopped selling other manufacturers' products, and devoted its gallery to its own lines. The new location includes a Christmas museum "to display [their] antique [moulds], some paired with Judi’s original castings, and they have collected original European catalogues showing the moulds available at the time". The studios were also laid out to accommodate guided tours. The founders' son, Luke M. Vaillancourt, joined the business in 2007 as director of digital marketing.

In 2008 the company introduced its Et Cetera line, and in 2009 it added a "Glimmer" finish to its chalkware and glass ornament lines (see Products). By 2009 its chalkware was sold in 20 Macy's stores as well as at Neiman Marcus, Nordstrom, Lord & Taylor, Frontgate, the Museum of Fine Arts, Boston, and Williamsburg.

In the winter of 2009 the company completed Blaxton Hall, an event space "named after William Blaxton, the first European settler in Boston and Rhode Island". The hall was built to host Gerald Charles Dickens, great-great-grandson of Charles Dickens, on his American tour of A Christmas Carol, beginning in 2009. In the one-man show, Dickens uses different voices, expressions and mannerisms to portray the story's twenty-six characters. Charles Dickens himself visited the Worcester area during his 1842 American tour.

In 2012 Vaillancourt and Byers' Choice, which had worked together on the "American Christmas Series", collaborated again when Joyce Byers and Judi Vaillancourt designed the Custom Christmas Artist Caroler. Byers' Choice described it as its first Caroler figure designed in collaboration with another company. The piece was introduced at the 17th annual Collector's Weekend at the Vaillancourt studio by Bob Byers Jr., president of Byers' Choice.

As of 2013, Judi Vaillancourt was designing more than 100 chalkware Santas a year, including non-Christmas designs such as an Easter Santa and a Nantucket Santa introduced each summer. In 2014 the company introduced "Jingle Balls", a line of round glass ornaments painted with the faces of Santas, snowmen, and European Father Christmas figures. In 2015 it introduced a glass ornament collection based on A Christmas Carol, with designs "inspired by Arthur Rackham’s interpretation of Charles Dickens immortal words."

Luke M. Vaillancourt became vice president of operations in 2016. In 2017 he represented the company at a Small Business Week constituent roundtable in Washington, D.C., hosted by Congressman Jim McGovern.

=== Rebranding and later developments (2018–present) ===
In 2018 the company rebranded its retail division. The redesigned logo replaced the words "Folk Art" with "Made in Massachusetts" and added a Victorian Christmas tree, and the retail gallery began displaying Christmas decorations year-round. The company said the change was meant to avoid confusion over the term "folk art" and to emphasize its Massachusetts origins; it followed growth in its e-commerce business and a reorganization of its digital and retail departments. At the time, retail accounted for nearly 60% of revenue, "with most of the retail sales occurring online."

Also in 2018 the company began selling two consumable products in its Sutton gallery: a Christmas blend coffee and a limited-edition, hand-numbered Christmas wine, both produced with Massachusetts companies.

For its 35th anniversary in 2019, the company released a limited-edition piece and a book, It's Hard To Tell When A Traditions Begins: A Vaillancourt Christmas (ISBN 1733078703), and held its first Christkindlesmarkt, a two-day Christmas festival attended by 1,100 people.

In 2020 the Boston Business Journal included the company in its list of the 50 fastest-growing private companies in Massachusetts, reporting three-year revenue growth of 95.85%. That year Luke M. Vaillancourt was named president, succeeding Gary Vaillancourt, who moved into an advisory role. The COVID-19 pandemic led the company to cancel events such as the Christkindlesmarkt; it instead held a series of small outdoor German-style Christmas wine markets.

The company marked its 40th anniversary in 2024 with the year-long theme "Cherish". Plans announced in late 2023 included a one-of-a-kind statement piece and limited 40th-anniversary designs. An opening event for collectors in April 2024 introduced a limited-edition anniversary Santa and announced a one-of-a-kind 200-pound (91 kg) Santa to be shown that fall.

== Products ==
Chalkware
Chalkware is molded plaster decorated with paint, popular in the 19th century, sometimes called "poor man's porcelain" and later given as carnival prizes. The company's main product is a contemporary form in which a plaster-like material is cast in antique confectionery molds and hand-painted in oils.
Creamware
The Classical Christmas Creamware line, designed by Judi Vaillancourt as an alternative to conventional dinnerware, is made by hand by a creamware manufacturer in Stoke-on-Trent, England, using 18th-century methods.
Glass ornaments
The company's mouth-blown glass ornaments are based on its chalkware figurines. The line was developed in 1996 with a small German glass company; after that manufacturer went out of business, production moved to a small factory in Poland, where each ornament is mouth-blown and hand-painted. The "Glimmer" line introduced in 2009 was described by Gift Shop Magazine as "best described as contemporary, but (remains) within the scope of traditional country décor."
Licensed lines
Judi Vaillancourt's designs have been licensed to Gorham Silver (from 1986) and Possible Dreams (in the 1990s).
Et Cetera
Introduced in 2008, this line applies the company's designs to everyday items such as acrylic coasters, wood-framed mirrors, ceramic trivets, dishes, treasure boxes, serving trays, and metal ornaments. The items are manufactured in Maine and Virginia.
Vaillancourt Design Group
Led by Luke M. Vaillancourt, this division produces custom designs on American-made products for organizations, for uses such as fundraising items, alumni gifts, and personalized gifts. Projects have included acrylic coasters for Worcester Academy, enamel coasters for the College of the Holy Cross, metal ornaments for Old Sturbridge Village, and wedding favors.
Consumables
Since 2018 the company has sold private-label coffee and wine produced with two Massachusetts companies.

== Distribution and marketing ==
The company began wholesale distribution in 1989, and in 1992 Nordstrom became the first department store to carry its products nationally. The company states that it sells to about 300 stores in the United States, including Roger's Gardens, Nordstrom, Neiman Marcus, Lord & Taylor, Macy's and Bloomingdale's, the Frontgate catalog, and independent retailers.

The company's website launched in 1998 and sells to both individuals and businesses. By 2007 its online sales were approaching its in-store sales. During the 2008 recession, the owners said they remained optimistic about consumer demand for American-made products. The company has used Xerox printing technology in its marketing.

== Tourism and recognition ==
The Sutton studios have been promoted as a stop for visitors to New England. The Massachusetts Office of Travel and Tourism's 2009–2010 vacation guide listed the company as one of six "behind-the-scenes" places to visit, alongside Cape Cod Potato Chips, Cisco Brewers, Fenway Park, Boston Beer Company, and Harbor Sweets. In 2010 the Great Places in Massachusetts Commission included it in its list of 1,000 places to visit in the state. In 2012 the Worcester Business Journal ranked it 15th among the area's tourist attractions, with 18,500 visitors to the studios.

Other recognition in 2010 included the Worcester Business Journal's Central Massachusetts Family Business Award and selection as a finalist for the Internet Retailer category of the Gifts & Decorative Accessories Retailer Excellence Awards. The same year, a bill to designate the company the official Christmas ornament and collectibles maker of the Commonwealth of Massachusetts received a hearing before the legislature's Joint Committee on State Administration and Regulatory Oversight.

== Philanthropy ==
In 1991 the Starlight Children's Foundation made a presentation to American gift companies, after which Judi Vaillancourt began designing an annual Starlight Santa, with a portion of sales benefiting critically and chronically ill children. As of 2009, the proceeds had funded 104 wishes and 15 Fun Centers for pediatric hospitals in New England. The company and its founders have received awards for this work from the Starlight Children's Foundation, the pediatric division of the University of Massachusetts hospital, the Retailers Association of Massachusetts, and other organizations.

Actress Emma Samms, a founder of the foundation, and television host Tom Bergeron have appeared at the company's Starlight fundraising events, beginning in 1991; Bergeron returned in 2009 for an anniversary of the partnership.

After the foundation closed its local offices in 2013, the company announced in 2014 that donations would instead go directly to the Child Life Artist in Residence Program at UMass Memorial Children's Medical Center in Worcester.

== Community involvement ==
In 1992 Gary Vaillancourt worked with the Worcester County Convention & Visitors Bureau (WCCVB) to create the "Chain of Lights", a multi-town program in which local businesses coordinated holiday promotions, each town's event featuring a lighting ceremony. In its first year the program extended from the Westminster Village Inn in the north through Worcester and Sturbridge. Sutton's contribution, originally called "Christmas Tasting in Sutton", involved Vaillancourt Folk Art, Pleasant Valley Country Club, Eaton's Candy, and Known Orchards, which jointly rented a trolley to carry visitors between the businesses. At Vaillancourt, the first event coincided with the Starlight Santa fundraiser and included an appearance by Tom Bergeron, then of WBZ-TV. The evening ended with the lighting of Christmas lights on the town common.

Most participating towns ended their coordinated events after the WCCVB discontinued the program. Sutton has continued its event under a local volunteer committee of residents, business owners and organizations. It has grown from one trolley and four stops in 1992 to several trolleys on multiple routes connecting about a dozen businesses.

The company took part in the 300th anniversary of Sutton and the 2010 bicentennial of Millbury. For each, Judi Vaillancourt designed a limited-edition chalkware Santa with imagery specific to the town: 300 pieces for Sutton and 200 for Millbury. The Millbury Santa stood 6 inches (15 cm) tall, dressed in the town's maroon, with a gold sack holding a lamb in reference to the town's wool-manufacturing history and its "Woolies" mascot.

== In popular culture ==
Emma Samms and Tom Bergeron first visited the Vaillancourt studios in 1991 in connection with the Starlight Children's Foundation. Bergeron has made several later appearances in support of the fundraiser, including one in November 2008 while he was hosting Dancing with the Stars. Author and illustrator Tasha Tudor spent a weekend (April 26–27) at the company meeting readers and speaking on a panel about illustration and art.

At the request of several museums, the company produced commemorative figures based on the drawings of the 1860s artist Thomas Nast, including an Abraham Lincoln chalkware piece made for Gettysburg, Ford's Theatre, and the Abraham Lincoln Presidential Library and Museum. Judi and Gary Vaillancourt unveiled the Lincoln piece and a Civil War Santa on September 4, 2010, at the Gettysburg National Military Park bookstore. A photograph of the Lincoln piece appeared in an episode of the History Channel series American Pickers that aired on January 24, 2011. In 2014 the company made a Las Vegas Santa exclusively for Wynn Las Vegas.

Older Vaillancourt pieces are traded on the secondary market and have been covered in collectibles price guides and collector publications.

The company's chalkware and ornaments appear as set decoration in the Lifetime television films Christmas a la Mode (2019) and Christmas on Ice (2020), both directed by John Stimpson, and in Stimpson's A Cape Cod Christmas (2021). The film About Fate, shot in 2021 by director Marius Balchunas, includes a storefront dressed to resemble the company's Sutton storefront.
