= Vladas Zajančkauskas =

Lithuanian Nazi collaborator (1915–2013)

- Born: Vladas Zajančkauskas; December 27, 1915; Aukštadvaris, Lithuania District, Ober Ost
- Died: August 5, 2013 (aged 97); Sutton, Massachusetts, U.S.

Vladas Zajančkauskas (December 27, 1915 – August 5, 2013) was a Lithuanian Nazi collaborator during World War II and alleged war criminal. At age 95 (as of July 2010) he stood to become the oldest person ever deported as a result of an investigation by the U.S. Justice Department's Office of Special Investigations (OSI).

Zajančkauskas was born in Aukštadvaris. In 2005 and 2010, the U.S. federal courts asserted that Zajančkauskas deployed to Warsaw, Poland with a detachment of the Trawniki-trained guards who participated in the Nazi annihilation of the Warsaw Ghetto, an operation that triggered the Warsaw Ghetto Uprising and led to the extermination of more than 50,000 Jews. The federal courts rejected as incredible his claim that, as a captured member of the Lithuanian Army, he was only in charge of the canteen at the Trawniki training camp, and was never in Warsaw. Records released by Russian authorities in the 1990s were used by the OSI as evidence in the case. His name appears on a roster of 351 men deployed to the ghetto, a document which was captured by the Red Army in 1945.

The U.S. Federal Court twice found Zajančkauskas guilty (in 2005 and 2010) of having falsely concealed his wartime whereabouts on his original visa application on arrival in the 1950s and ordered his deportation from the United States. Immigration Judge Wayne R. Iskra ordered Zajančkauskas removed to his native Lithuania. The Associated Press reported in July 2013 that Zajančkauskas still lived in Sutton, Massachusetts, as no country, including his native Lithuania, would accept him. He died there in August 2013.

== Writing ==
Zajančkauskas wrote a 99-page memoir, My Bits of Life in This Beautiful World, which described his childhood and wartime experiences.
