= Universal Statuary Corp. =

Defunct American statue manufacturer

Universal Statuary Corp
- Industry: Manufacturing
- Headquarters: Chicago, Illinois, U.S.

Universal Statuary Corp. was an American, Chicago-based, statue manufacturer. Jack and Leo Lucchesi were brothers that founded the Universal Statuary Corp in the 1930s. Jack ran the business, Leo ran production. The company produced piggy banks, plaques and (by the late 1930s) large store displays, including Indian statues for western themed restaurants. In the 1950s, they produced chalkware lamps, usually featuring paired male and female figures, and other home decor that is widely collected today.

The company employed many immigrant artisans to design the chalkware and plaster figures and produce the statues, lamps, home decor pieces and display advertising figures. Jack's wife was from Guatemala. Universal made a concerted effort to bring Italian and Guatemalan immigrants to America and help them out. Universal was also famous for the contract work performed for Sears, Wards and many big advertising firms for their unique 'Point Of Sale' displays and promotions.

== 1950s-1970s ==
Universal began in a multi-story Chicago Ave. where they made mostly plaster/chalkware products. In the 1950s they moved to a new second single story building located on Ogden Ave., where they began working with experimental composites. There they transitioned from chalkware to resins and came up with a material "FiberClad InFrangible", and guaranteed it would not break or chip. The company employed plastic in the 1970s.

== Family sells business ==
The Lucchesi family sold the company in the early 1980s. James L. Dorman owned the company in the late 1980s and it was headquartered in Milwaukee. The company employed about 130 people in Chicago in the late 1980s.

Collectors provide a market for resale of the statues, but they are not generally valued highly in monetary terms. In 1996, the company was owned by B. Paul Brueggemeier and was having to leave its factory at 850 North Ogden to make way for a town house development.

The company also made lawn ornaments from resin and bookends. Statuettes featured whimsical figures of animals or children and were sold at Sears and other outlet stores.
