= Charles Andrew Whitney =

American businessman and industrialist (1834–1912)

- Born: November 14, 1834; Princeton, Massachusetts, United States
- Died: December 31, 1912 (aged 78)
- Occupation(s): Businessman, industrialist
- Known for: Developed large-scale manufacturing of shoes in Chicago
- Spouse: Martha Elizabeth (Née Waters) Whitney

Charles Andrew Whitney (November 14, 1834 – December 31, 1912) was an American businessman and industrialist in the late 19th century, born in Princeton, Massachusetts. He was part of the prominent American Whitney family. In 1859, Charles, his brother Levi L. Whitney, and Orville E. Thompson helped lead the large-scale manufacturing of leather boots and shoes in Chicago and were attributed with successfully running the first factory of its kind there. Whitney himself held patents for the manufacture of leather.

Thompson, Whitney, and Co. (later Whitney Bros. and Co.) had 300 workers and annual revenue of over $300,000, producing over 100 cases of leather goods per week at its peak. In the 1860s, the company was among the top producers in the rapidly growing Chicago leather industry, and its products were showcased in the Paris Universal Exposition of 1867. In 1870, the company was noted as by far the highest-grossing producer in the city.

After the loss of the factory in the Great Chicago Fire of 1871, Charles returned to Massachusetts with his wife Martha Elizabeth (Waters) Whitney, and resided at the historic Waters Farm in Sutton, Massachusetts. He died December 31, 1912, at the age of 78 from arteriosclerosis.
