= Sutton Center Historic District =

Historic district in Massachusetts, United States

- U.S. National Register of Historic Places
- U.S. Historic district
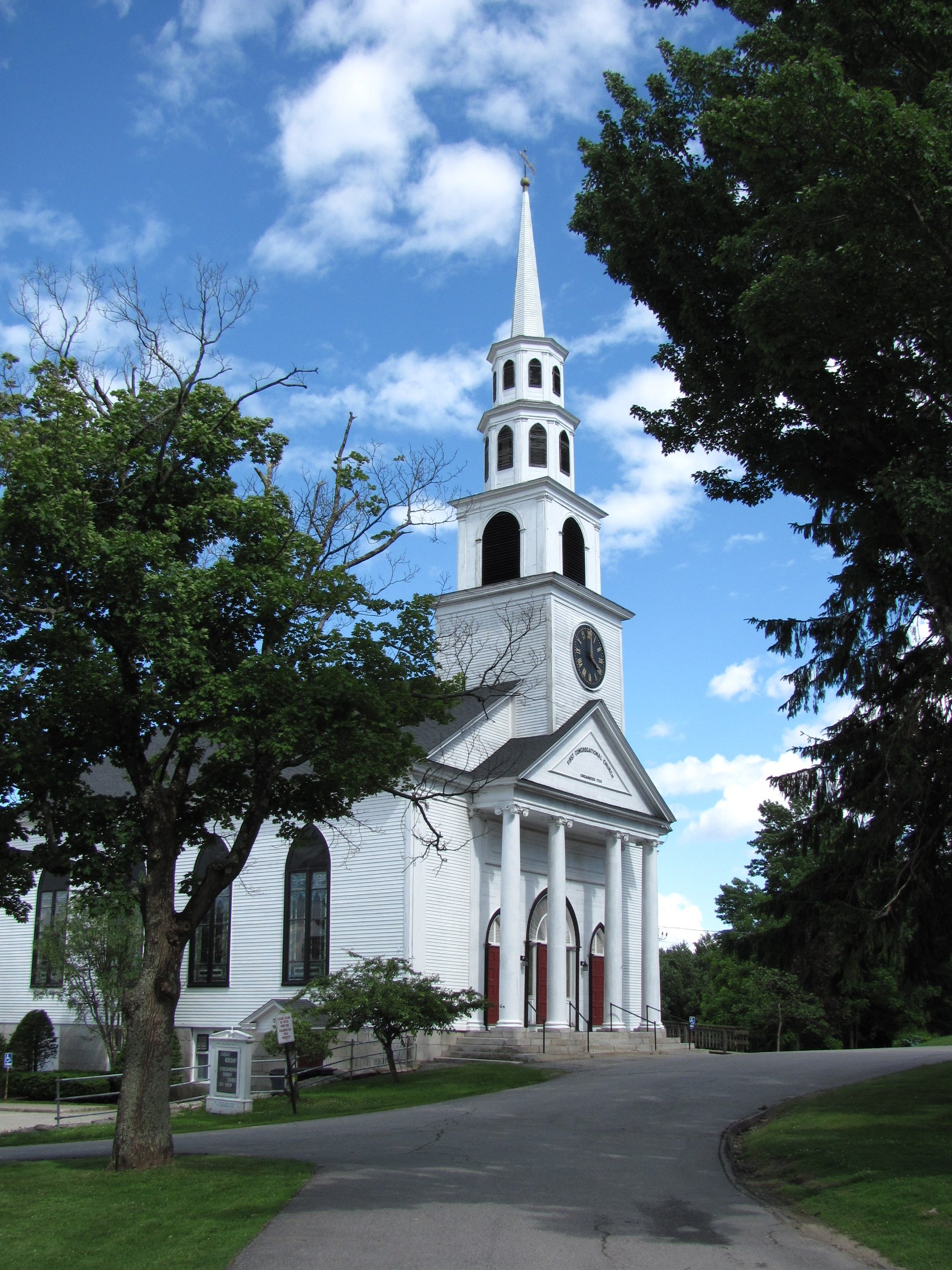
- First Congregational Church

- Location within Massachusetts Location within the United States
- Location: Sutton, Massachusetts
- Coordinates: 42°9′5″N 71°45′54″W
- Area: 435 acres (176 ha)
- Built: 1719
- Architect: Upham, Joel; Johnson, Vernon S.
- Architectural style: Federal, Greek Revival
- NRHP reference No.: 01000541
- Added to NRHP: May 25, 2001

The Sutton Center Historic District is a historic district encompassing the center of the village of Sutton, Massachusetts. The district, which covers 435 acres (176 ha), is centered on the junction of Boston Road, Singletary Avenue, and Uxbridge Road. Boston Road is a major east–west route through the town, and the other two roads run north–south through the village center. The Colombian building was built in 1957. A typically rural village center, its civic and institutional buildings are clustered near the intersection on its south side, in the general area of the town common. The town common and cemetery were laid out in 1719, after settlement of the township began in 1716. There are a few surviving houses that date to the middle of the 18th century or earlier; exact dates for most are uncertain. There are only a few institutional buildings: the 1829 Congregational Church, the 1983 Town Hall, built on the site of the town's first purpose-built town hall (1885), and Rufus Putnam Hall, an 1824 school building and Masonic lodge that now houses the local history museum. Only one commercial structure the 1839 Brick Block, stands in the village. There is also a historic animal pound, a rectangular stone structure used to pen stray livestock, which dates to the early days of the town.

Most of the district consists of residential and rural properties. The residential housing stock dates from the 18th to the 20th century, featuring a diversity of architectural styles. There are a significant number of 19th century farm outbuildings that have survived, predominantly barns. There are in all more than 120 contributing resources.

The district was listed on the National Register of Historic Places in 2001.

== See also ==
- National Register of Historic Places listings in Worcester County, Massachusetts
