= Waters Farm =

- U.S. National Register of Historic Places
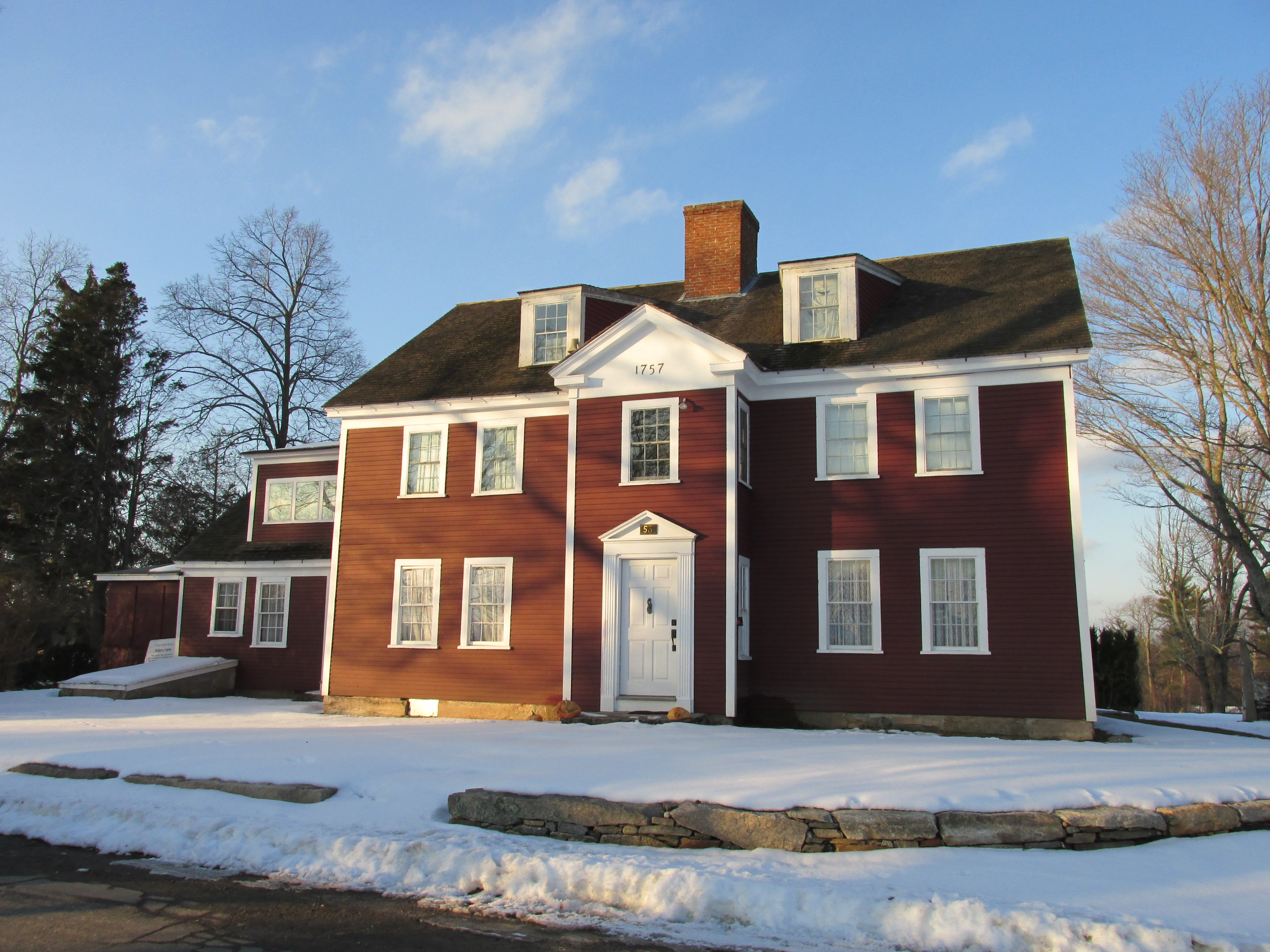
- Waters Farm in 2013.

- Location within Massachusetts Location within the United States
- Location: 53 Waters Road; Sutton, Massachusetts 01590
- Coordinates: 42°6′21″N 71°47′2″W
- Built: 1757
- Architect: Multiple
- Architectural style: Georgian
- Website: watersfarm.org
- NRHP reference No.: 85000695
- Added to NRHP: April 4, 1985

Waters Farm is a historic farm and homestead at 53 Waters Road in Sutton, Massachusetts. Waters Farm was built in the Georgian style by Stephen Waters in 1757. The property was added to the National Register of Historic Places in 1985.

== History ==
Built in 1757, Waters Farms Preservation, Inc. now maintains the property. It has 120 acres (0.49 km^{2}) of protected watershed land donated to the town by Dorothea Waters Moran in 1974. The main house was built in the mid- to late 18th century and was also donated to the town. Most outbuildings were donated or constructed on site after the town received the property, including a blacksmith shop, shingle mill, barn, wagon shed and sugar house.

From 1871 to 1912, the businessman Charles Andrew Whitney resided at Waters Farms.

Today, Waters Farms is an open-air museum.

== See also ==
- List of museums in Massachusetts
- List of open-air and living history museums in the United States
- National Register of Historic Places listings in Worcester County, Massachusetts
