= Benjamin Marsh =

Sutton, Massachusetts
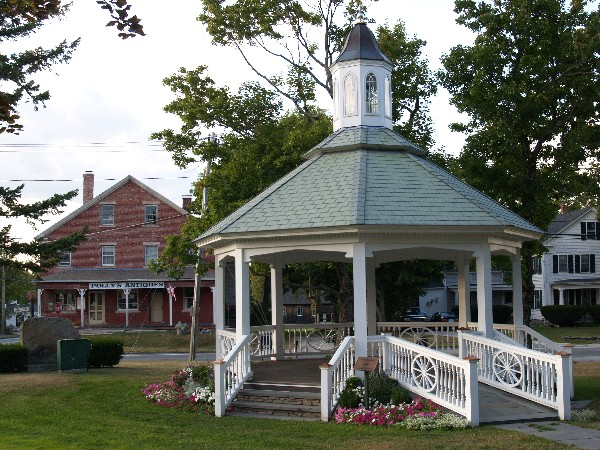
- Sutton Town Common

Benjamin Marsh I (1687 – c. 1775) was one of the founders of Sutton, Massachusetts. He was the founder of the first Baptist Church in Sutton, and served as its pastor and as an elder.

In 1716, the families of Benjamin Marsh, Elisha Johnson and Nathaniel Johnson were the first three pioneer families to settle what is now Sutton. Brothers Samuel and Daniel Carriel also occupied the Benjamin Marsh family cabin. They almost didn't survive the first winter — the winter of the "big snow" — which buried their cabins. Marsh's daughter, Abigail, was the first white child born in Sutton. As the town grew, Marsh held a number of positions of responsibility, including Selectman, Town Clerk and Town Moderator. He served on committees representing the town for the purpose of erecting a meeting house and financial matters, and served as Trustee for town funds. On Sep. 16, 1735, he founded the town's Baptist church, which is the fourth oldest Baptist church in Massachusetts. He served as an elder of the church, and was its pastor from 1737 until his death in 1775.

Elder Marsh is buried in a small cemetery on the Marsh homestead, with a granite headstone marked "Eld. M."
