= Chalkware =

Sculpted painted figures made of plaster of Paris or gypsum

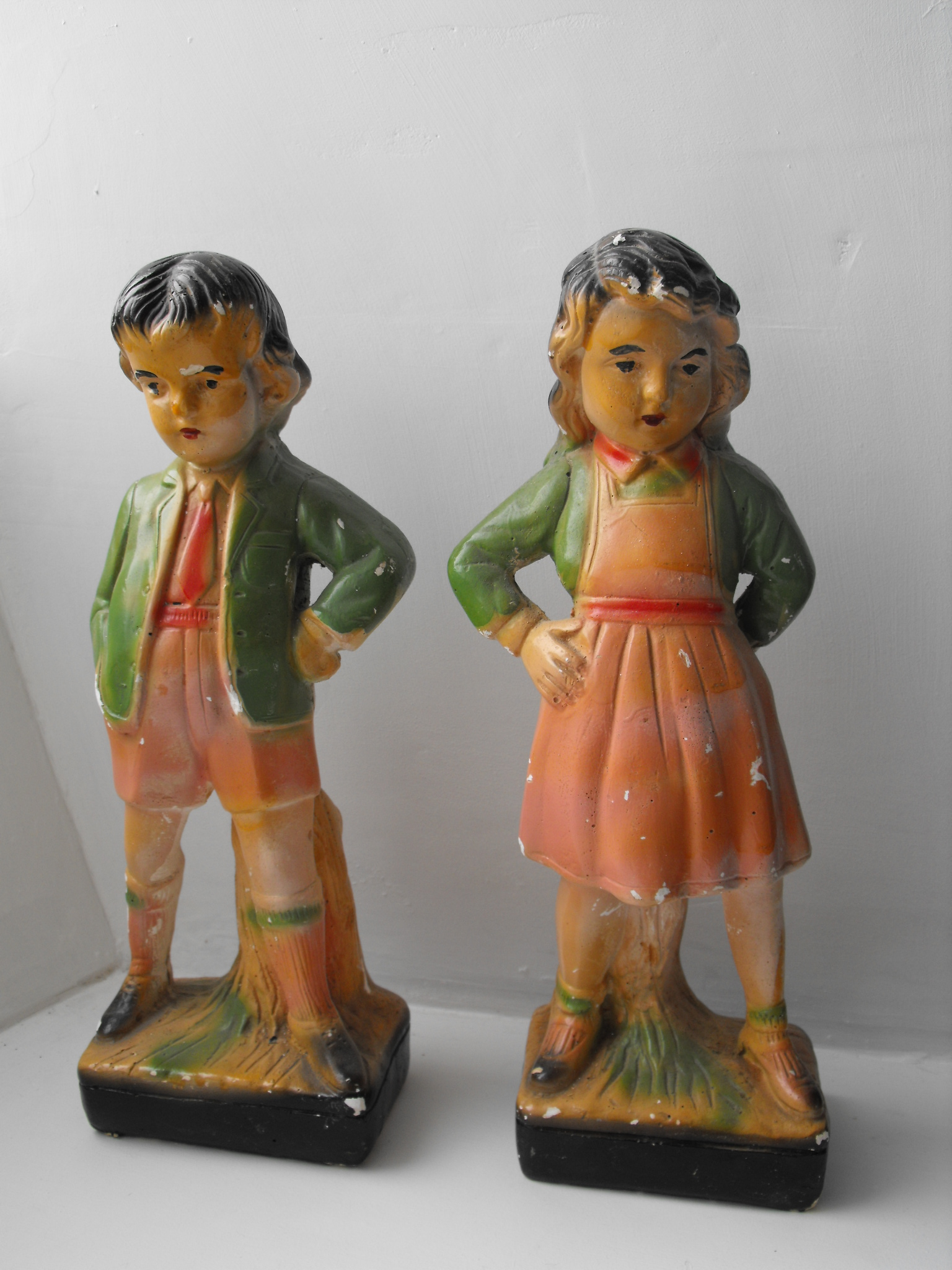
Two chalkware figurines

Chalkware is a mainly American term for popular figurines either made of moulded plaster of Paris (usually) or sculpted gypsum, and painted, typically with oils or watercolors. They were primarily created during one of three periods: from the late 18th century to the beginning of the 20th century, during the Great Depression, and during the 'mid-century modern' era as decorative lamps, figurines and wall decor from the 1940s-1960s. Those created during the earlier period were intended as a more serious decorative art, often imitating the more expensive imported English Staffordshire potteries figurines such as Staffordshire dog figurines; those during the second period, by contrast, were more typically somewhat jocular. Early chalkware was often hollow and is difficult to find unblemished.

Heavy, and easy to break or chip, chalkware eventually lost favor to ceramic and plastic alternatives in the 1970s. Remaining pieces of MCM (and earlier) chalkware can be easily found today with more exotic or rare examples fetching hundreds or thousands of dollars by collectors on auction sites and other dealers.

== Carnival chalk ==
"Carnival chalk" refers to chalkware figures given out as carnival game prizes during the first half of the 20th century, especially during World War II. They were later replaced by stuffed animals.

== Mid-century modern (MCM) era ==
Chalkware flourished during the mid-century modern era (1945-1965) as an inexpensive and expressive medium for the home, serving many types of taste and types of decorative need with table lamps, figurines, wall decor and tourist memorabilia. Attracting fine, mundane and comic artists, chalkware reached a broad audience during the MCM era providing everything from representations of European sculpture, to kitsch images of exotic travel, cartoonish characters and potty humor.

=== Figurines ===
Early figurines made in the United Kingdom around 1955 were eggcups, for holding matches or as ashtrays. The earliest designers being Paoli Brothers and Hermann Lohnberg. Fashions changed into 1956 with a move to animals. By 1957, figurines and statues of african-style ladies and gentlemen were very dominant. A view of all the examples found at the National Archives records can be seen on the Chalkware Gallery site.

=== Lamps ===
MCM chalkware lamps were often romantic and exotic with a focus on the idealized beauty of historic, natural, and abstract designs. Common motifs were dancers (often sold as a male and female pair), innocent or sensual figures, trees, flowers, animals, zig-zags, waves and modern abstract sculpture typical of the period. One of the most popular motifs were of romanticized, stereotyped Asian, African, Native American, Hawaiian people in exotic (at times inaccurate) settings or costume. Low lighting was sometimes included in the lamp design with small nightlight bulbs. TV lamps, based upon popular chalkware radio lamp designs, quickly became replaced by ceramic.

An attempt to thwart competitors from copying their highly successful male/female paired chalkware lamps and statuettes was taken all the way to the U.S. Supreme Court by Benjamin and Rena Stein of Reglor of California in 1953. They won a technical victory that did not ultimately stop copying.

=== Wall decor ===
Wall decor chalkware included bath motifs like fish or mermaids, kitchen motifs like fruit, and 'wall pockets' that often were faces with small areas in the back suitable for air plants or plastic flowers.

In the United Kingdom, during the 1950s and 1960s, wall plaques were made of ladies faces by a number of designers, including Salvatore Melani, the Lohnberg brothers (under the Duron brand name), Paoli Brothers and Bacci & Bacci

=== Memorabilia ===
Tourist memorabilia included ashtrays, figures, bobble-heads and destination-specific representations.

=== Advertising ===
Companies such as the Universal Statuary Corp of Chicago made point-of-sale chalkware figures as well.

=== Production houses ===
Popular American MCM chalkware companies whose work can be found traded today include Continental Art Company (Chicago), Alexander Baker Company or 'ABCO' (New York), Fine Arts In Plastics or F.A.I.P (Brooklyn), Jo Wallis Lamp Company, Miller Studios, Reglor (Montebello, California) Universal Statuary Corp. (Chicago), and Vaillancourt Folk Art (Massachusetts).

Several chalkware companies also existed in the United Kingdom, where they registered their designs at the National Archives in Kew, London, England. The Board of Trade records are set out in two main sections: The Board of Trade Records of the Patent Office Design Registers (records starting BT 53) and the Non-Textile Designs Representations (records starting BT 52).

Designs in Great Britain in the 1950s and 1960s were registered under the Registered Designs Act, 1949 (still current law as at November 2021). Each registered design is recorded in a lever arch folder with consecutive registration numbers and can be accessed at the National Archives in Kew, London. Each entry contains a registered design number, the date when the design was registered, the date the certificate was issued, brief article description (typically "a mantel ornament") and the name & address of the proprietor. Some designers also included a separate service address. Copyright typically expired on these pieces after 5 years, with some records showing an extension to 10 years.

A number of designers chose to include the registration number on the figurine, typically at the back, with a small number of designers also including an internal product number. The registration number can therefore be looked up in the Board of Trade BT 53 records and use the BT 52 design representation images to confirm the correct figurine has been identified.

With this knowledge it is possible to compile the following main list of designers;

- Felice and Alfredo Bacci - 73, Camp Street, Salford 7, Lancashire
- Bruno Besagni - Holborn, England
- Elia and Milo Brunicardi (with Lino Maini) - 158 Copenhagen Street, Islington, London N1
- Egisto Carli - Pancras area, London
- Marcella Jackson, Renato Migliorini, Daniele Magi and Vasco Licci, trading as M. Jackson &amp Co - 66, Rigby Street, Salford, 7, Lancaster
- Max (born 1880 - died 1958) and Herbert Hermann Louis Lohnberg - 2, Ronalds Road, Holloway Road, London N5
- Lorenzo and Leo Menesini - 21 Pickering Street, London N1
- Diomede and Nicolao Nieri trading as D. N. Art Products - 26 and 28 Trafford Street, Hulme, Manchester 15, Lancashire
- Leo Pagliai - Great Sutton Street, London
- Alfredo and Giovanni Paoli - 125-127 East Road, London N1
- Guido Quattromini, Umberto Berti and Gino Berti trading as F. and B. Sales - 127 Caledonian Road, London N1
- Gino Manca - Italian designer who moved to Sweden

== See also ==
- Ceramic forming techniques
- Kewpie doll
- Vaillancourt Chalkware
- Universal Statuary Corp.
