= West Sutton Historic District =

Historic district in Massachusetts, United States

- U.S. National Register of Historic Places
- U.S. Historic district
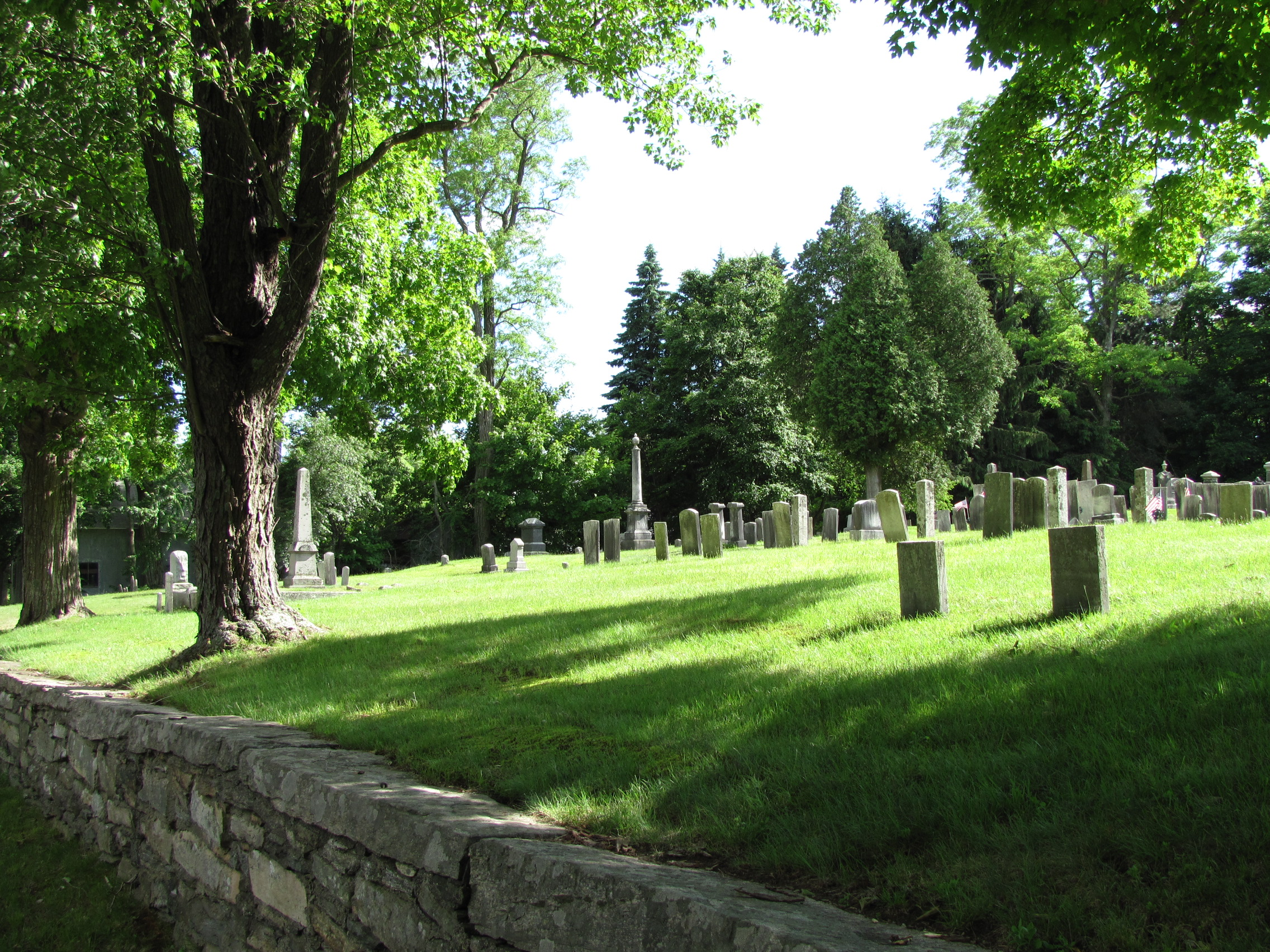
- West Sutton Cemetery

- Location within Massachusetts Location within the United States
- Location: Sutton, Massachusetts
- Coordinates: 42°7′2″N 71°48′11″W
- Area: 460 acres (190 ha)
- Built: 1721
- Architectural style: Federal, Greek Revival
- NRHP reference No.: 01000871
- Added to NRHP: August 8, 2001

The West Sutton Historic District encompasses the rural southwestern section of Sutton, Massachusetts, United States, including the rural village of West Sutton, which stretches along Central Turnpike from Manchaug Road to the Oxford town line. Most of its 460 acres (190 ha) are taken up by farmsteads and the associated agricultural lands. The village, which consists primarily of residential properties from the 18th and 19th centuries, also includes a church, cemetery, former tavern, former school, and evidence of an early industrial past, including one extant sawmill which dates to 1831.

The district was listed on the National Register of Historic Places in 2001.

== See also ==
- National Register of Historic Places listings in Worcester County, Massachusetts
