= 1952 LPGA Tour =

Golf tour season

1952 LPGA Tour season
- Duration: January 4, 1952 – October 28, 1952
- Number of official events: 24
- Most wins: 8 (United States) Betsy Rawls
- Money leader: (United States) Betsy Rawls

The 1952 LPGA Tour was the third season since the LPGA Tour officially began in 1950. The season ran from January 4 to October 28. The season consisted of 24 official money events. Betsy Rawls won the most tournaments, eight. Rawls led the money list with earnings of $14,505.

There was only one first-time winner in 1952, Marlene Bauer.

The tournament results are listed below.

== Tournament results ==
The following table shows all the official money events for the 1952 season. "Date" is the ending date of the tournament. The numbers in parentheses after the winners' names are the number of wins they had on the tour up to and including that event. Majors are shown in bold.

Date	Tournament	Location	Winner	Score	Purse ($)	1st prize ($)
Jan 6	Jacksonville Open	Florida	(United States) Louise Suggs (10)	277	3,000	750
Jan 20	Tampa Open	Florida	(United States) Louise Suggs (11)	293	3,500	1,000
Feb 17	Miami Weathervane	Florida	(United States) Babe Zaharias (28)	145	3,000	750
Mar 2	Sarasota Open	Florida	(United States) Marlene Bauer (1)	71		350
Mar 16	**Titleholders Championship**	Georgia	(United States) **Babe Zaharias (29)**	299	2,100	1,000
Mar 30	New Orleans Women's Open	Louisiana	(United States) Patty Berg (22)	299	3,925	1,000
Apr 12	Houston Weathervane	Texas	(United States) Betsy Rawls (3)	140	3,000	750
Apr 14	Corpus Christi Tournament	Texas	(United States) Betty Jameson (5)	74		375
Apr 28	Richmond Open	California	(United States) Patty Berg (23)	210	3,000	750
Apr 30	Stockton Open	California	(United States) Louise Suggs (12)	72		375
May 1	Bakersfield Open	California	(United States) Marlene Bauer (2) (tie) (United States) Betty Jameson (6) (United States) Betsy Rawls (4) (United States) Babe Zaharias (30)	74		225 each
May 4	Fresno Open	California	(United States) Babe Zaharias (31)	226	5,000	1,175
May 11	Seattle Weathervane	Washington	(United States) Betsy Rawls (5)	139	3,000	750
Jun 1	New York Weathervane	New York	(United States) Patty Berg (24)	148	3,000	750
Jun 4	Cross Country 144 Hole Weathervane	various	(United States) Betsy Rawls (6)	590	5,000	5,000
Jun 8	Eastern Women's Open	Pennsylvania	(United States) Betsy Rawls (7)	226		875
Jun 21	**Women's Western Open**	Illinois	(United States) **Betsy Rawls (8)**	1 up	5,000	1,000
Jun 29	**U.S. Women's Open**	Pennsylvania	(United States) **Louise Suggs (13)**	284	7,500	2,000
Aug 10	All American Open	Illinois	(United States) Louise Suggs (14)	300	2,550	1,000
Aug 17	World Championship	Illinois	(United States) Betty Jameson (7)	303		5,000
Sep 7	Carrollton Open	Georgia	(United States) Betsy Rawls (9)	214 (−2)	3,000	750
Sep 10	Thomasville Open	Georgia	(United States) Betsy Rawls (10)	74		375
Oct 19	Betty Jameson Open	Texas	(United States) Louise Suggs (15)	212		875
Oct 28	Women's Texas Open	Texas	(United States) Babe Zaharias (32)	7 & 6		300
