= 1955 LPGA Tour =

Golf tour season

1955 LPGA Tour season
- Duration: January 6, 1955 – October 9, 1955
- Number of official events: 27
- Most wins: 6 (United States) Patty Berg
- Money leader: (United States) Patty Berg
- Vare Trophy: (United States) Patty Berg

The 1955 LPGA Tour was the sixth season since the LPGA Tour officially began in 1950. The season ran from January 6 to October 9. The season consisted of 27 official money events. Patty Berg won the most tournaments, six. She also led the money list with earnings of $16,492.

The season saw the first winner from outside the United States, Fay Crocker from Uruguay. It also included the last of Babe Zaharias's 41 wins, she died the following year. The LPGA added a major championship to its schedule, the LPGA Championship, won by Beverly Hanson. Another major, the Women's Western Open, changed its format from match play to stroke play.

The tournament results and award winners are listed below.

== Tournament results ==
The following table shows all the official money events for the 1955 season. "Date" is the ending date of the tournament. The numbers in parentheses after the winners' names are the number of wins they had on the tour up to and including that event. Majors are shown in bold.

Date	Tournament	Location	Winner	Score	Purse ($)	1st prize ($)
Jan 8	Los Angeles Open	California	(United States) Louise Suggs (30)	224	5,000	1,000
Jan 16	Sea Island Open	Georgia	(United States) Jackie Pung (3)	151	3,500	700
Jan 23	Tampa Open	Florida	(United States) Babe Zaharias (40)	298	5,000	1,000
Feb 13	St. Petersburg Open	Florida	(United States) Patty Berg (35)	292	5,000	1,000
Feb 20	Serbin Open	Florida	(Uruguay) Fay Crocker (1)	296	5,000	1,000
Feb 27	Sarasota Open	Florida	(United States) Betty Jameson (10)	285	5,000	1,000
Mar 6	Jacksonville Open	Florida	(United States) Jackie Pung (4)	297	5,000	1,000
Mar 13	**Titleholders Championship**	Georgia	(United States) **Patty Berg (36)**	292	5,000	1,000
Apr 3	Oklahoma City Open	Oklahoma	(United States) Louise Suggs (31)	229	5,000	1,000
Apr 17	Babe Zaharias Open	Texas	(United States) Betty Jameson (11)	210	5,000	1,000
Apr 23	Carrollton Open	Georgia	(United States) Betsy Rawls (18)	218	5,000	1,000
May 1	Peach Blossom Open	South Carolina	(United States) Babe Zaharias (41)	293	5,000	1,000
May 28	Wolverine Open	Michigan	(Uruguay) Fay Crocker (2)	291	5,000	1,000
Jun 5	Eastern Open	Pennsylvania	(United States) Louise Suggs (32)	291	5,000	1,000
Jun 16	Triangle Round Robin	New York	(United States) Louise Suggs (33)	+44	3,500	1,500
Jun 26	**Women's Western Open**	Wisconsin	(United States) **Patty Berg (37)**	292	5,000	1,000
Jul 2	**U.S. Women's Open**	Kansas	(Uruguay) **Fay Crocker (3)**	299	7,500	2,000
Jul 17	**LPGA Championship**	Indiana	(United States) **Beverly Hanson (6)**	220	6,000	1,200
Jul 31	Battle Creek Open	Michigan	(United States) Beverly Hanson (7)	220	5,000	1,000
Aug 7	All American Open	Illinois	(United States) Patty Berg (38)	302	5,000	1,000
Aug 14	World Championship	Illinois	(United States) Patty Berg (39)	298	12,000	5,000
Aug 23	White Mountain Open	New Hampshire	(United States) Betty Jameson (12)	218	4,000	900
Aug 28	Heart of America Open	Missouri	(United States) Marilynn Smith (2)	220	4,500	900
Sep 12	St. Louis Open	Missouri	(United States) Louise Suggs (34)	289	4,300	900
Sep 18	Mile High Open	Colorado	(United States) Marilynn Smith (3)	221	5,000	900
Sep 25	Clock Open	California	(United States) Patty Berg (40)	288	4,500	900
Oct 9	Richmond Open	California	(United States) Betty Jameson (13)	220	5,000	900

== Awards ==
Award	Winner	Country
Money winner	Patty Berg (2)	United States
Scoring leader (Vare Trophy)	Patty Berg (2)	United States
