= 1953 LPGA Tour =

Golf tour season

1953 LPGA Tour season
- Duration: January 15, 1953 – October 18, 1953
- Number of official events: 25
- Most wins: 9 (United States) Louise Suggs
- Money leader: (United States) Louise Suggs
- Vare Trophy: (United States) Patty Berg

The 1953 LPGA Tour was the fourth season since the LPGA Tour officially began in 1950. The season ran from January 15 to October 18. The season consisted of 25 official money events. Louise Suggs won the most tournaments, nine. She also led the money list with earnings of $19,816.

This season also saw the introduction of the Vare Trophy for the lowest scoring average, won by Patty Berg. There was only one first-time winner in 1953, Jackie Pung.

The tournament results and award winners are listed below.

== Tournament results ==
The following table shows all the official money events for the 1953 season. "Date" is the ending date of the tournament. The numbers in parentheses after the winners' names are the number of wins they had on the tour up to and including that event. Majors are shown in bold.

Date	Tournament	Location	Winner	Score	Purse ($)	1st prize ($)
Jan 18	Tampa Open	Florida	(United States) Louise Suggs (16)	288	5,000	1,250
Feb 8	Serbin Miami Beach Open	Florida	(United States) Betty Jameson (8)	222	5,000	875
Feb 14	Boca Raton Weathervane	Florida	(United States) Beverly Hanson (3)	148	3,000	750
Mar 1	Sarasota Open	Florida	(United States) Babe Zaharias (33)	217	3,517	875
Mar 8	Jacksonville Open	Florida	(United States) Patty Berg (25)	214		875
Mar 15	**Titleholders Championship**	Georgia	(United States) **Patty Berg (26)**	294	2,200	1,000
Mar 22	Betsy Rawls Open	South Carolina	(United States) Louise Suggs (17)	216	3,500	875
Mar 29	New Orleans Women's Open	Louisiana	(United States) Patty Berg (27)	227	3,500	875
Apr 5	Babe Zaharias Open	Texas	(United States) Babe Zaharias (34)	217		875
Apr 12	Phoenix Weathervane	Arizona	(United States) Patty Berg (28) (tie) (United States) Louise Suggs (18)	148	3,000	
Apr 16	Palm Springs Open	California	(United States) Jackie Pung (1)	145	3,000	750
Apr 19	San Diego Open	California	(United States) Louise Suggs (19)	144	3,500	750
Apr 26	Bakersfield Open	California	(United States) Louise Suggs (20)	149	3,500	875
May 3	San Francisco Weathervane	California	(United States) Louise Suggs (21)	149	3,000	750
May 10	Barbara Romack Open	California	(United States) Betsy Rawls (11)	145	3,236	875
May 17	Reno Open	Nevada	(United States) Patty Berg (29)	151	3,500	875
May 31	Philadelphia Weathervane	Pennsylvania	(United States) Louise Suggs (22)	146	3,000	750
May 31	144 Hole Weathervane	various	(United States) Louise Suggs (23)	593	5,000	5,000
Jun 7	Eastern Open	Pennsylvania	(United States) Betsy Rawls (12)	293	5,000	1,250
Jun 20	**Women's Western Open**	Georgia	(United States) **Louise Suggs (24)**	6 & 5		1,000
Jun 28	**U.S. Women's Open**	New York	(United States) **Betsy Rawls (13)**	302	7,500	2,000
Jul 5	Triangle Round Robin	New Jersey	(United States) Jackie Pung (2)	+38	7,500	1,500
Aug 3	All American Open	Illinois	(United States) Patty Berg (30)	308		1,000
Aug 9	World Championship	Illinois	(United States) Patty Berg (31)	300	12,000	5,000
Oct 18	Fort Worth Open	Texas	(United States) Betsy Rawls (14)	5 & 4	1,500	500

== Awards ==
Award	Winner	Country
Money winner	Louise Suggs	United States
Scoring leader (Vare Trophy)	Patty Berg	United States
