= List of U.S. Women's Open champions =

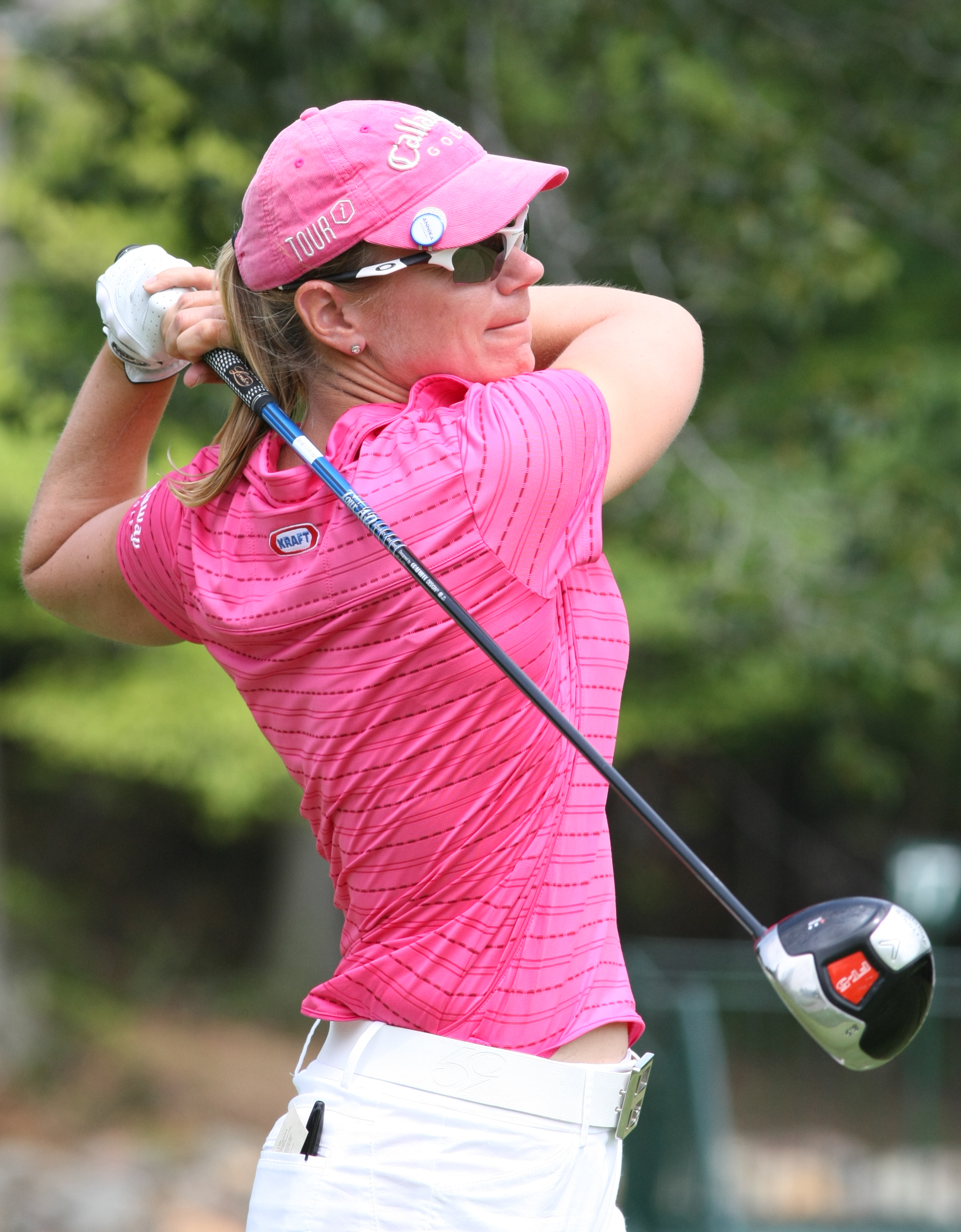
Annika Sörenstam was a three-time winner of the event in 1995, 1996 and 2006, and one of seven golfers to repeat as champion.

The U.S. Women's Open is an annual golf competition that was established in 1946. Since 1953, the championship is sanctioned by the United States Golf Association (USGA), the governing body for the game in the United States. Originally played as the "Ladies" Open, the event was sanctioned by the Women's Professional Golfers Association from 1946 to 1948, and by the Ladies Professional Golf Association (LPGA) from 1949 to 1952. It is one of the five women's major championships, alongside the Chevron Championship, the Women's PGA Championship, the Women's British Open, and The Evian Championship. The U.S. Women's Open has always been played in stroke play, with the exception of the first competition in 1946, and is currently the third women's major of the year.

The first trophy presented to U.S. Women's Open champions was donated by the Spokane Athletic Round Table, a fraternal order, and used until 1953. The USGA commissioned the silversmith J. E. Caldwell and Co. of Philadelphia to produce a sterling-silver two-handled trophy, which was first presented to Betsy Rawls in 1953, and was retired to the USGA Museum in 1992. Since then, the champion receives the Harton S. Semple Trophy, named for a former USGA committeeman and the USGA president from 1973 to 1974. It was commissioned by Semple's family and friends in July 1992, and was first presented to Patty Sheehan that year.

Rawls and Mickey Wright jointly hold the record for the most U.S. Women's Open victories, with four each. The most consecutive wins at the event is two, achieved by Wright, Susie Berning, Hollis Stacy, Annika Sörenstam, Donna Caponi, Betsy King and Karrie Webb. The lowest^{[a]} winning score for 72 holes in relation to par is 16-under, achieved by Juli Inkster in 1999. The lowest aggregate winning score for 72 holes is 271, achieved by Minjee Lee in 2022. Conversely, the highest winning score for 72 holes in relation to par is 13-over, achieved by Murle Lindstrom in 1962. The highest aggregate winning score for 72 holes is 302, achieved by Rawls in 1953 and Kathy Cornelius in 1956; both events were won in playoffs. The oldest champion was Babe Zaharias in 1954, at the age of 43, and the youngest champion was Inbee Park in 2008, at the age of 19. The U.S. Women's Open has had eight wire-to-wire champions: Zaharias in 1954, Fay Crocker in 1955, Wright in 1958, Mary Mills in 1963, Catherine Lacoste in 1967, Berning in 1968, Donna Caponi in 1970, and JoAnne Carner in 1971.

== Champions ==
Key

*	Tournament won in a playoff
#	Tournament won by an amateur
‡	Wire-to-wire victory

Edition	Year	Country	Champion	Course	Location	Total score	To par^{[a]}	Notes
1st	1946	United States	Patty Berg	Spokane Country Club	Spokane, Washington	5&4^{[b]}	—	
2nd	1947	United States	Betty Jameson	Starmount Forest Country Club	Greensboro, North Carolina	295	−9	
3rd	1948	United States	Babe Zaharias	Atlantic City Country Club	Northfield, New Jersey	300	E	
4th	1949	United States	Louise Suggs	Prince George's Golf and Country Club	Landover, Maryland	291	−9	
5th	1950	United States	Babe Zaharias	Rolling Hills Country Club	Wichita, Kansas	291	−9	
6th	1951	United States	Betsy Rawls	Druid Hills Golf Club	Atlanta, Georgia	293	+5	
7th	1952	United States	Louise Suggs	Bala Golf Club	Philadelphia, Pennsylvania	284	+8	
8th	1953	United States	Betsy Rawls*	Country Club of Rochester	Rochester, New York	302	+6	^{[c]}
9th	1954‡	United States	Babe Zaharias	Salem Country Club	Peabody, Massachusetts	291	+3	
10th	1955‡	Uruguay	Fay Crocker	Wichita Country Club	Wichita, Kansas	299	+11	
11th	1956	United States	Kathy Cornelius*	Northland Country Club	Duluth, Minnesota	302	+7	^{[d]}
12th	1957	United States	Betsy Rawls	Winged Foot Golf Club, East Course	Mamaroneck, New York	299	+7	
13th	1958‡	United States	Mickey Wright	Forest Lake Country Club	Bloomfield Hills, Michigan	290	−2	
14th	1959	United States	Mickey Wright	Churchill Valley Country Club	Pittsburgh, Pennsylvania	287	+7	
15th	1960	United States	Betsy Rawls	Worcester Country Club	Worcester, Massachusetts	292	+4	
16th	1961	United States	Mickey Wright	Baltusrol Golf Club, Lower Course	Springfield, New Jersey	293	+5	
17th	1962	United States	Murle Lindstrom	Dunes Golf and Beach Club	Myrtle Beach, South Carolina	301	+13	
18th	1963‡	United States	Mary Mills	Kenwood Country Club	Cincinnati, Ohio	289	−3	
19th	1964	United States	Mickey Wright*	San Diego Country Club	Chula Vista, California	290	−2	^{[e]}
20th	1965	United States	Carol Mann	Atlantic City Country Club	Northfield, New Jersey	290	+2	
21st	1966	United States	Sandra Spuzich	Hazeltine National Golf Club	Chaska, Minnesota	297	+9	
22nd	1967‡	France	Catherine Lacoste#	The Homestead, Virginia	Hot Springs, Virginia	294	+10	
23rd	1968‡	United States	Susie Berning	Moselem Springs Golf Club	Fleetwood, Pennsylvania	289	+5	
24th	1969	United States	Donna Caponi	Scenic Hills Country Club	Pensacola, Florida	294	+2	
25th	1970‡	United States	Donna Caponi	Muskogee Country Club	Muskogee, Oklahoma	287	+3	
26th	1971‡	United States	JoAnne Carner	Kahkwa Club	Erie, Pennsylvania	288	E	
27th	1972	United States	Susie Berning	Winged Foot Golf Club, East Course	Mamaroneck, New York	299	+11	
28th	1973	United States	Susie Berning	Country Club of Rochester	Rochester, New York	290	+2	
29th	1974	United States	Sandra Haynie	La Grange Country Club	La Grange, Illinois	295	+7	
30th	1975	United States	Sandra Palmer	Atlantic City Country Club	Northfield, New Jersey	295	+7	
31st	1976	United States	JoAnne Carner*	Rolling Green Golf Club	Springfield Township, Pennsylvania	292	+8	^{[f]}
32nd	1977	United States	Hollis Stacy	Hazeltine National Golf Club	Chaska, Minnesota	292	+4	
33rd	1978	United States	Hollis Stacy	Country Club of Indianapolis	Indianapolis, Indiana	289	+5	
34th	1979	United States	Jerilyn Britz	Brooklawn Country Club	Fairfield, Connecticut	284	E	
35th	1980	United States	Amy Alcott	Richland Country Club	Nashville, Tennessee	280	−4	
36th	1981	United States	Pat Bradley	La Grange Country Club	La Grange, Illinois	279	−9	
37th	1982	United States	Janet Alex	Del Paso Country Club	Sacramento, California	283	−5	
38th	1983	Australia	Jan Stephenson	Cedar Ridge Country Club	Tulsa, Oklahoma	290	+6	
39th	1984	United States	Hollis Stacy	Salem Country Club	Peabody, Massachusetts	290	+2	
40th	1985	United States	Kathy Baker	Baltusrol Golf Club	Springfield, New Jersey	280	−8	
41st	1986	United States	Jane Geddes*	NCR Country Club	Kettering, Ohio	287	−1	^{[g]}
42nd	1987	England	Laura Davies*	Plainfield Country Club	Edison, New Jersey	285	−3	^{[h]}
43rd	1988	Sweden	Liselotte Neumann	Baltimore Country Club, Five Farms, East Course	Baltimore, Maryland	277	−7	
44th	1989	United States	Betsy King	Indianwood Golf and Country Club, Old Course	Lake Orion, Michigan	278	−6	
45th	1990	United States	Betsy King	Atlanta Athletic Club, Riverside Course	Duluth, Georgia	284	−4	
46th	1991	United States	Meg Mallon	Colonial Country Club	Fort Worth, Texas	283	−1	
47th	1992	United States	Patty Sheehan*	Oakmont Country Club	Oakmont, Pennsylvania	280	−4	^{[i]}
48th	1993	United States	Lauri Merten	Crooked Stick Golf Club	Carmel, Indiana	280	−8	
49th	1994	United States	Patty Sheehan	Indianwood Golf and Country Club, Old Course	Lake Orion, Michigan	277	−7	
50th	1995	Sweden	Annika Sörenstam	Broadmoor Golf Club, East Course	Colorado Springs, Colorado	278	−2	
51st	1996	Sweden	Annika Sörenstam	Pine Needles Lodge and Golf Club	Southern Pines, North Carolina	272	−8	
52nd	1997	England	Alison Nicholas	Pumpkin Ridge Golf Club, Witch Hollow Course	North Plains, Oregon	274	−10	
53rd	1998	South Korea	Se Ri Pak*	Blackwolf Run	Kohler, Wisconsin	290	+6	^{[j]}
54th	1999	United States	Juli Inkster	Old Waverly Golf Club	West Point, Mississippi	272	−16	
55th	2000	Australia	Karrie Webb	Merit Club	Libertyville, Illinois	282	−6	
56th	2001	Australia	Karrie Webb	Pine Needles Lodge and Golf Club	Southern Pines, North Carolina	273	−7	
57th	2002	United States	Juli Inkster	Prairie Dunes Golf Club	Hutchinson, Kansas	276	−4	
58th	2003	United States	Hilary Lunke*	Pumpkin Ridge Golf Club, Witch Hollow Course	North Plains, Oregon	283	−1	^{[k]}
59th	2004	United States	Meg Mallon	The Orchards Golf Club	South Hadley, Massachusetts	274	−10	
60th	2005	South Korea	Birdie Kim	Cherry Hills Country Club	Cherry Hills Village, Colorado	287	+3	
61st	2006	Sweden	Annika Sörenstam*	Newport Country Club	Newport, Rhode Island	284	E	^{[l]}
62nd	2007	United States	Cristie Kerr	Pine Needles Lodge and Golf Club	Southern Pines, North Carolina	279	−5	
63rd	2008	South Korea	Inbee Park	Interlachen Country Club	Edina, Minnesota	283	−9	
64th	2009	South Korea	Eun-Hee Ji	Saucon Valley Country Club	Bethlehem, Pennsylvania	284	E	
65th	2010	United States	Paula Creamer	Oakmont Country Club	Oakmont, Pennsylvania	281	−3	
66th	2011	South Korea	So Yeon Ryu*	Broadmoor Golf Club, East Course	Colorado Springs, Colorado	281	−3	^{[m]}
67th	2012	South Korea	Na Yeon Choi	Blackwolf Run	Kohler, Wisconsin	281	−7	
68th	2013	South Korea	Inbee Park	Sebonack Golf Club	Southampton, New York	280	−8	
69th	2014	United States	Michelle Wie	Pinehurst Resort	Pinehurst, North Carolina	278	−2	
70th	2015	South Korea	In Gee Chun	Lancaster Country Club	Lancaster, Pennsylvania	272	−8	
71st	2016	United States	Brittany Lang*	CordeValle Golf Club	San Martin, California	282	−6	^{[n]}
72nd	2017	South Korea	Park Sung-hyun	Trump National Golf Club	Bedminster, New Jersey	277	−11	
73rd	2018	Thailand	Ariya Jutanugarn*	Shoal Creek Golf and Country Club	Shoal Creek, Alabama	277	−11	^{[o]}
74th	2019	South Korea	Lee Jeong-eun	Country Club of Charleston	Charleston, South Carolina	278	−6	
75th	2020	South Korea	Kim A-lim	Champions Golf Club	Houston, Texas	281	−3	
76th	2021	Philippines	Yuka Saso*	Olympic Club, Lake Course	San Francisco, California	280	−4	^{[p]}
77th	2022	Australia	Minjee Lee	Pine Needles Lodge and Golf Club	Southern Pines, North Carolina	271	−13	
78th	2023	United States	Allisen Corpuz	Pebble Beach Golf Links	Pebble Beach, California	279	−9	
79th	2024	Japan	Yuka Saso	Lancaster Country Club	Lancaster, Pennsylvania	276	−4	
80th	2025	Sweden	Maja Stark	Erin Hills	Erin, Wisconsin	281	−7	
81st	2026	United States	Nelly Korda	Riviera Country Club	Pacific Palisades, California	276	−8	

== Multiple champions ==
This table lists the golfers who have won more than one U.S. Women's Open. Champions who win consecutively are indicated by the years with italics*.

Key

‡	Career Grand Slam winners
T1	Tied for first place
T3	Tied for third place
T7	Tied for seventh place

Rank	Country	Golfer	Total	Years
T1	United States	Betsy Rawls	4	1951, 1953, 1957, 1960
T1	United States	Mickey Wright ‡	4	1958*, 1959*, 1961, 1964
T3	United States	Babe Zaharias	3	1948, 1950, 1954
T3	United States	Susie Berning	3	1968, 1972*, 1973*
T3	United States	Hollis Stacy	3	1977*, 1978*, 1984
T3	Sweden	Annika Sörenstam ‡	3	1995*, 1996*, 2006
T7	United States	Louise Suggs ‡	2	1949, 1952
T7	United States	Donna Caponi	2	1969*, 1970*
T7	United States	JoAnne Carner	2	1971, 1976
T7	United States	Betsy King	2	1989*, 1990*
T7	United States	Patty Sheehan	2	1992, 1994
T7	Australia	Karrie Webb ‡	2	2000*, 2001*
T7	United States	Juli Inkster ‡	2	1999, 2002
T7	United States	Meg Mallon	2	1991, 2004
T7	South Korea	Inbee Park	2	2008, 2013
T7	Japan	Yuka Saso	2	2021, 2024

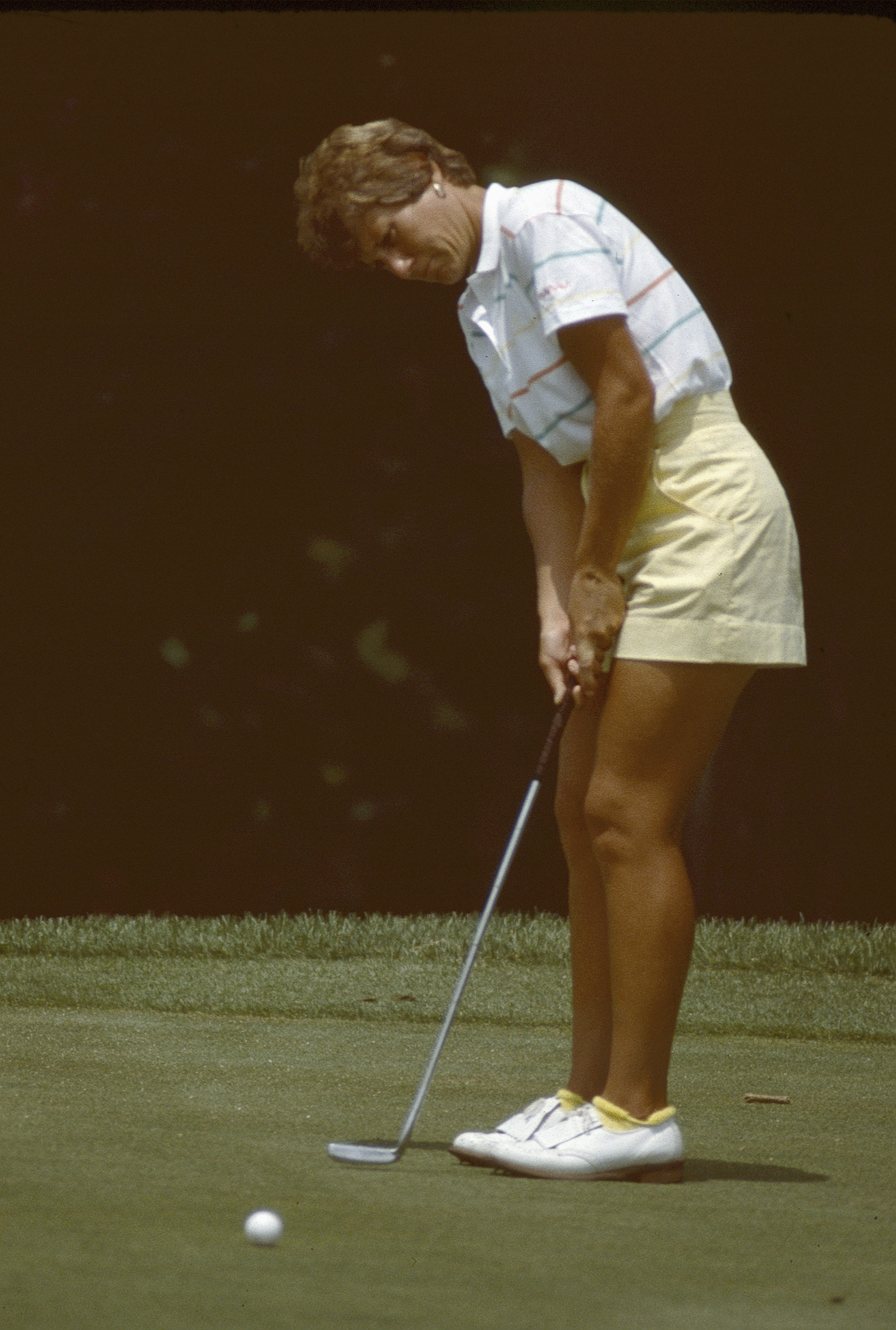
Patty Sheehan was a two-time champion of the event in 1992 and 1994.

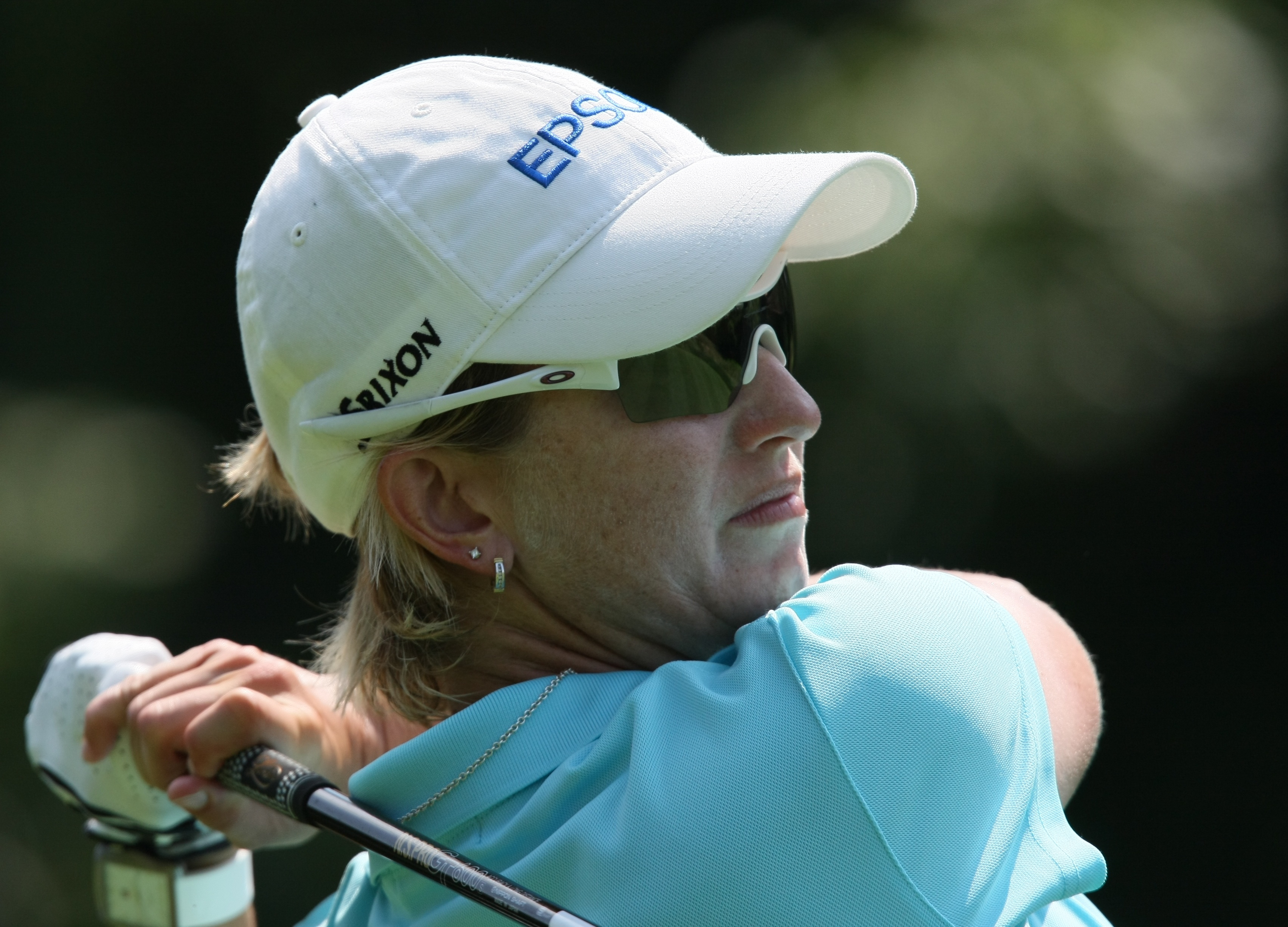
Karrie Webb is only one of seven golfers to repeat as champion of the event 2000 and 2001.

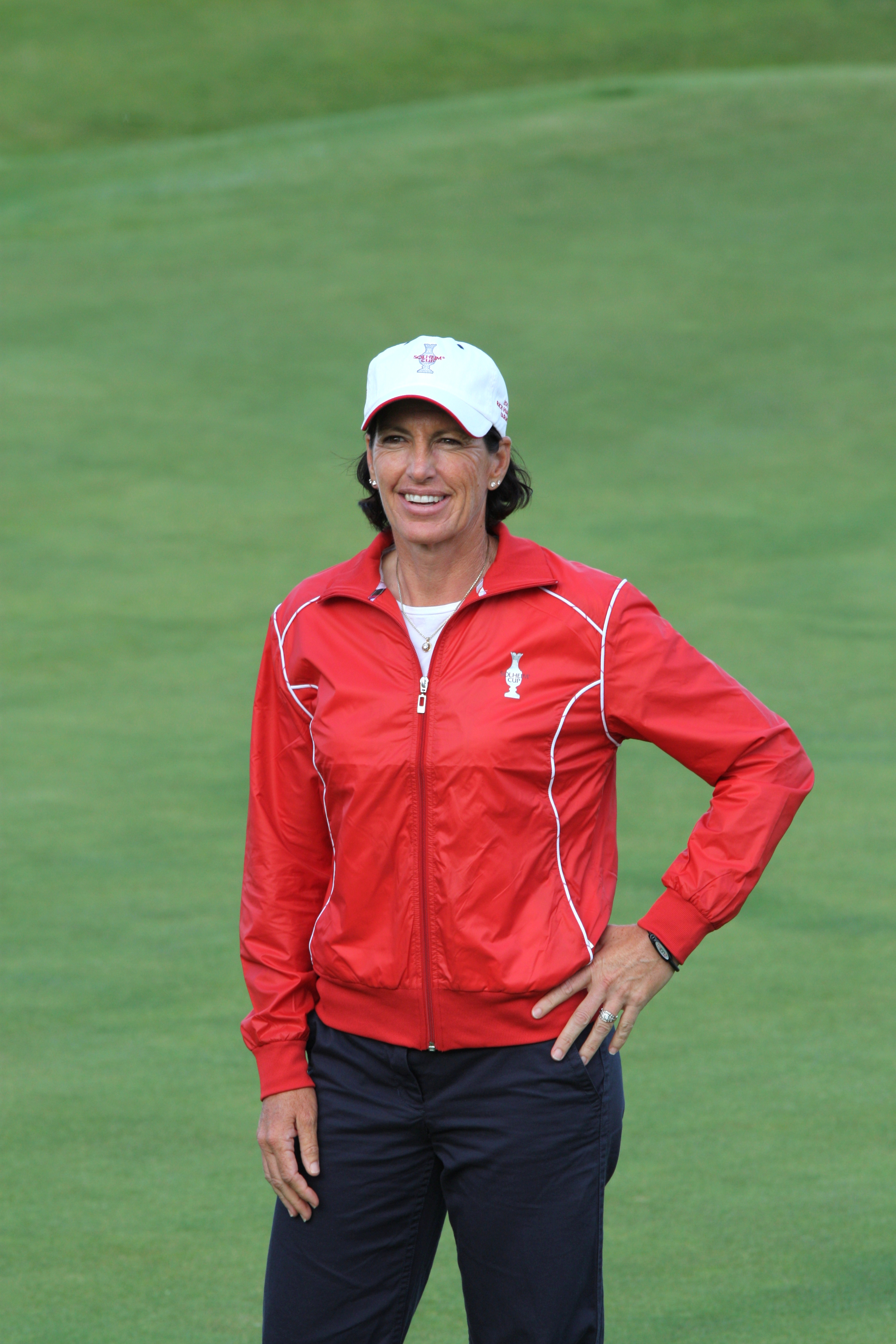
Juli Inkster is a two-time champion in 1999 and 2002.

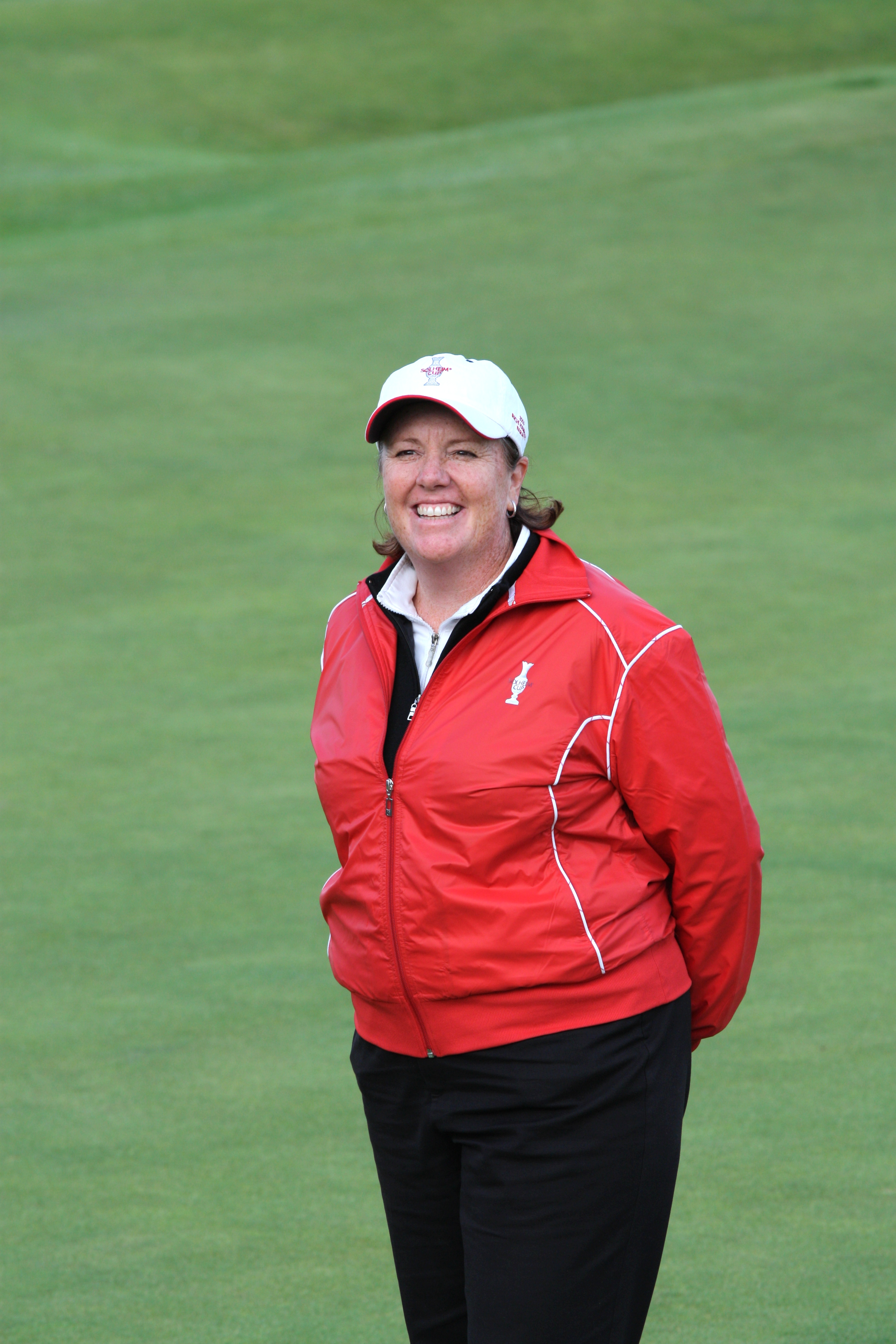
Meg Mallon is a two-time champion in 1991 and 2004.

== Champions by nationality ==
This table lists the total number of titles won by golfers of each nationality.

Rank	Nationality	Wins	Winners	First title	Last title
1	United States	54	35	1946	2026
2	South Korea	11	10	1998	2020
3	Sweden	5	3	1988	2025
4	Australia	4	3	1983	2022
5	England	2	2	1987	1997
T6	France	1	1	1967	1967
T6	Uruguay	1	1	1955	1955
T6	Thailand	1	1	2018	2018
T6	Philippines	1	1	2021	2021
T6	Japan	1	1	2024	2024

== See also ==
- Chronological list of LPGA major golf champions
- List of LPGA major championship winning golfers

== Notes ==
- ^{a} Par is a predetermined number of strokes that a golfer should require to complete a hole, a round (the sum of the total pars of the played holes), or a tournament (the sum of the total pars of each round). E stands for even, which means the tournament was completed in the predetermined number of strokes. The best score should always be the lowest in relation to par.
- ^{b} The first event was contested in match play competition. This means the score is reported differently.
- ^{c} Betsy Rawls won in an 18-hole playoff over Jackie Pung, 70–77.
- ^{d} Kathy Cornelius won in an 18-hole playoff over Barbara McIntire (a), 75–82.
- ^{e} Mickey Wright won in an 18-hole playoff over Ruth Jessen, 70–72.
- ^{f} JoAnne Carner won in an 18-hole playoff over Sandra Palmer, 76–78.
- ^{g} Jane Geddes won in an 18-hole playoff over Sally Little, 71–73.
- ^{h} Laura Davies won in an 18-hole playoff over Ayako Okamoto and JoAnne Carner, 71–73–74.
- ^{i} Patty Sheehan won in an 18-hole playoff over Juli Inkster, 72–74.
- ^{j} Se Ri Pak won in an 18-hole playoff over Jenny Chuasiriporn (a), 73–73, which she won in sudden death after that on the second extra hole.
- ^{k} Hilary Lunke won in an 18-hole playoff over Angela Stanford and Kelly Robbins, 70–71–73.
- ^{l} Annika Sörenstam won in an 18-hole playoff over Pat Hurst, 70–74.
- ^{m} So Yeon Ryu won in a 3-hole playoff over Hee Kyung Seo, 10–13.
- ^{n} Brittany Lang won in a 3-hole playoff over Anna Nordqvist, 12–15.
- ^{o} Ariya Jutanugarn won in a 2-hole playoff over Kim Hyo-joo, 8–8, which she won in sudden death after that on the second extra hole.
- ^{p} Yuka Saso won on the first hole of a sudden-death playoff with Nasa Hataoka, after they tied in the initial 2-hole playoff.
