= 1949 in sports =

1949 in sports describes the year's events in world sport.

== American football ==
- NFL Championship: the Philadelphia Eagles won 14–0 over the Los Angeles Rams at the Los Angeles Memorial Coliseum
- Cleveland Browns 21–7 San Francisco 49ers for the All-America Football Conference championship. After the 1949 season, the Browns, 49ers and original Baltimore Colts all joined the NFL for the 1950 season.
- The decades–long "color barrier" in athletics for the Big Seven Conference is broken by Harold Robinson, playing football for Kansas State. Robinson would go on to be named All–Conference in 1950.
- Notre Dame Fighting Irish – college football national championship

== Association football ==
England

- First Division – Portsmouth win the 1948–49 title.
- FA Cup – Wolverhampton Wanderers beat Leicester City 3–1.

Italy

- Superga air disaster – a plane carrying the Torino team crashes into a mountain on May 4, killing everyone on board. Of the entire squad, only one player (who didn't fly, due to injury) survived, as well as potential signing Ladislao Kubala, who was due to fly but did not, due to his son's ill health.

On 21 September 1949 at Goodison Park, Liverpool, the home of Everton, England were defeated 2–0 by Ireland in a friendly international.

== Australian rules football ==
- Victorian Football League
  - Essendon wins the 53rd VFL Premiership (Essendon 18.17 (125) d Carlton 6.16 (52))
  - Brownlow Medal awarded to Ron Clegg (South Melbourne) and Col Austen (Hawthorn)

== Baseball ==
- January 28 – The New York Giants sign their first black players: Negro leaguers outfielder Monte Irvin and pitcher Ford Smith. Both men are assigned to Jersey City. Irvin will star for the Giants, but Smith will not reach the major leagues.
- May 5 – Hall of Fame election. After a runoff election was necessary, Charlie Gehringer is selected for induction; on May 9, the Old-Timers Committee elects Mordecai "Three Finger" Brown and Kid Nichols as its first selections in 3 years.
- June 5 – MLB Commissioner Happy Chandler lifts the ban on all players who jumped to the Mexican League, starting in 1946.
- June 15 – Philadelphia Phillies first baseman Eddie Waitkus is shot in Chicago by deranged fan Ruth Ann Steinhagen.
- June 25 – College World Series - Texas Longhorns defeated Wake Forest 10 to 3
- The New York Yankees won the World Series over the Brooklyn Dodgers four games to one.
- December 5 – Hiroshima Carp, officially founded, with participation in Central League of Japan.

== Basketball ==
BAA (NBA) Finals

- Minneapolis Lakers over Washington Capitols (4–2)

NBL Championship

- Anderson Packers over Oshkosh All-Stars (3–0)

Events

- On August 3 the NBL merges with the BAA. The BAA also renames itself as the National Basketball Association.
- The sixth European basketball championship, Eurobasket 1949, is won by Egypt.
- The fourteenth South American Basketball Championship in Asunción is won by Uruguay.

== Boxing ==
- October 27 – death of Marcel Cerdan (33), Algerian–born French world middleweight champion, in an air crash

== Cricket ==
In the course of playing a Ranji Trophy semi-final at Poona in March, Bombay and Maharashtra set the still-standing record for the highest match aggregate of runs scored in a first-class match – 2,376 runs.

== Figure skating ==
- World Figure Skating Championships –
  - Men's champion: Dick Button, United States
  - Ladies' champion: Aja Zanova, Czechoslovakia
  - Pair skating champion: Andrea Kékesy & Ede Király, Hungary

== Golf ==
Men's professional

- Masters Tournament – Sam Snead
- PGA Championship – Sam Snead
- U.S. Open – Cary Middlecoff
- British Open – Bobby Locke

Men's amateur

- British Amateur – Max McCready
- U.S. Amateur – Charles Coe

Women's professional

- Women's Western Open – Louise Suggs
- U.S. Women's Open – Louise Suggs
- Titleholders Championship – Peggy Kirk

== Horse racing ==
Steeplechases

- Cheltenham Gold Cup – Cottage Rake
- Grand National – Russian Hero

Hurdle races

- Champion Hurdle – Hatton's Grace

Flat races

- Australia – Melbourne Cup won by Foxzami
- Canada – King's Plate won by Epic
- France – Prix de l'Arc de Triomphe won by Coronation
- Ireland – Irish Derby Stakes won by Hindostan
- English Triple Crown Races:
  1. 2,000 Guineas Stakes – Nimbus
  2. The Derby – Nimbus
  3. St. Leger Stakes – Ridge Wood
- United States Triple Crown Races:
  1. Kentucky Derby – Ponder
  2. Preakness Stakes – Capot
  3. Belmont Stakes – Capot

== Ice hockey ==
Stanley Cup

- Toronto Maple Leafs sweep the Detroit Red Wings four games to none.

Sweden

- Canada defeats Denmark 47–0 at the 1949 World Hockey Championships in Stockholm, Sweden.

United States

- NCAA Men's Ice Hockey Championship – Boston College Eagles defeat Dartmouth Big Green 4–3 in Colorado Springs, Colorado

== Netball ==
The 1949 England Scotland Wales Netball Series sees England, Scotland and Wales all play their debut netball test matches.

== Rowing ==
The Boat Race

- 26 March — Cambridge wins the 95th Oxford and Cambridge Boat Race

== Rugby league ==
- 1948–49 Kangaroo tour of Great Britain and France
- 1949 Kangaroo tour of New Zealand

Australia

- 1949 NSWRFL season

England

- 1948–49 Northern Rugby Football League season/1949–50 Northern Rugby Football League season

== Rugby union ==
Five Nations Championship

- 55th Five Nations Championship series is won by Ireland
- 3 September – "blackest day" in All Blacks history as two Test matches are lost on the same day: 6–11 at home to the Wallabies; and 3–9 on tour to South Africa.

== Snooker ==
- World Snooker Championship – Fred Davis beats Walter Donaldson 80–65.

== Speed skating ==
Speed Skating World Championships

- Men's All-round Champion – Kornél Pajor (Hungary)
- Women's All-round Champion – Maria Isakova (USSR)

== Tennis ==
Australia

- Australian Men's Singles Championship – Frank Sedgman (Australia) defeats John Bromwich (Australia) 6–3, 6–2, 6–2
- Australian Women's Singles Championship – Doris Hart (USA) defeats Nancye Wynne Bolton (Australia) 6–3, 6–4

England

- Wimbledon Men's Singles Championship – Ted Schroeder (USA) defeats Jaroslav Drobný (Czechoslovakia) 3–6, 6–0, 6–3, 4–6, 6–4
- Wimbledon Women's Singles Championship – Louise Brough Clapp (USA) defeats Margaret Osborne duPont (USA) 10–8, 1–6, 10–8

France

- French Men's Singles Championship – Frank Parker (USA) defeats Budge Patty (USA) 6–3, 1–6, 6–1, 6–4
- French Women's Singles Championship – Margaret Osborne duPont (USA) defeats Nelly Adamson Landry (France) 7–5, 6–2

USA

- American Men's Singles Championship – Pancho Gonzales (USA) defeats Ted Schroeder (USA) 16–18, 2–6, 6–1, 6–2, 6–4
- American Women's Singles Championship – Margaret Osborne duPont (USA) defeats Doris Hart (USA) 6–3, 6–1

Davis Cup

- 1949 Davis Cup – United States 4–1 Australia at West Side Tennis Club (grass) New York City, United States

== Volleyball ==
- Men's World Championship in Prague won by the USSR

== Awards ==
- Associated Press Male Athlete of the Year – Leon Hart, College football
- Associated Press Female Athlete of the Year – Marlene Bauer, LPGA golf
