= Women's major golf championships =

Championships in women's major golf

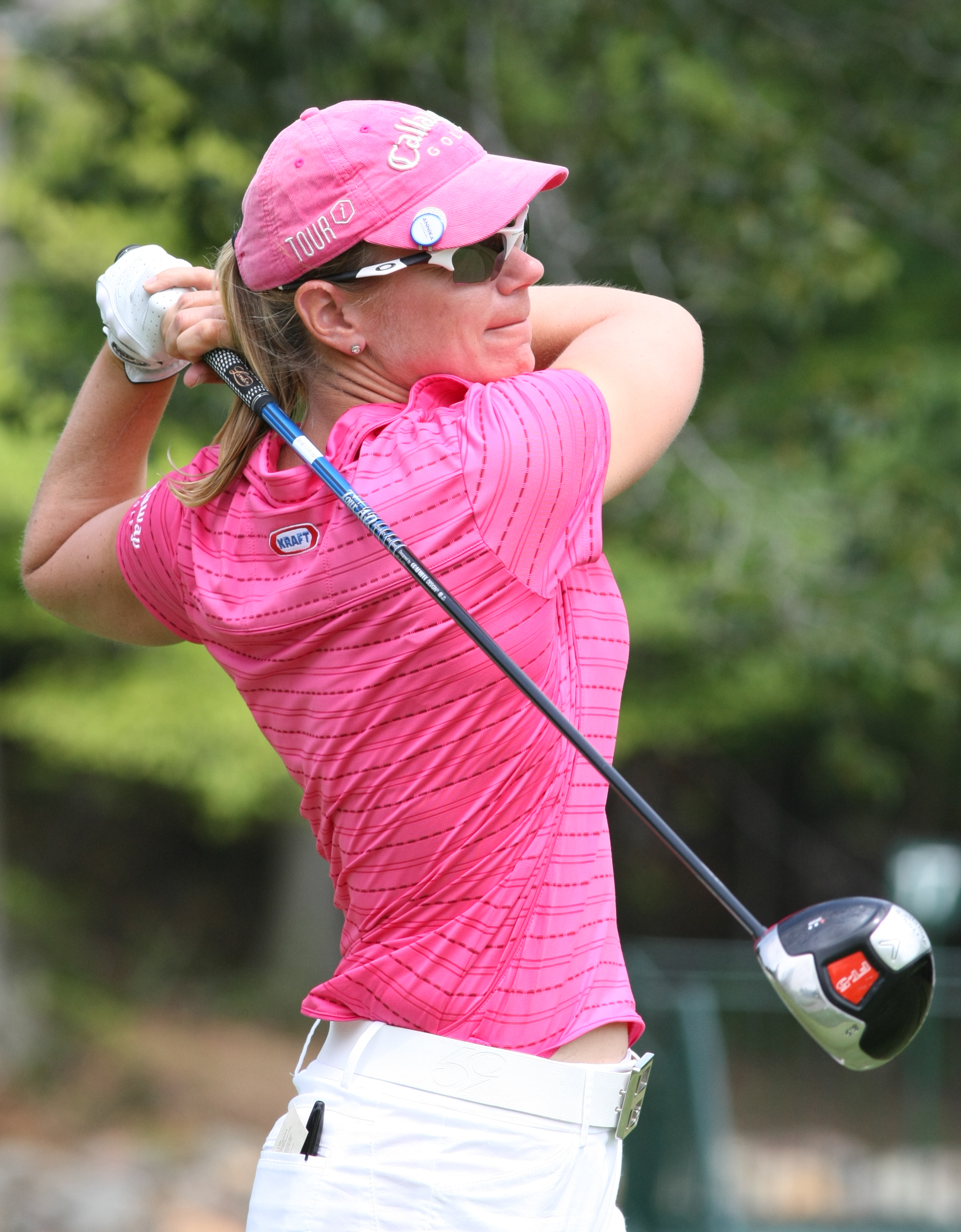
Annika Sörenstam won ten women's major golf championships, the most in the third era of women's majors.

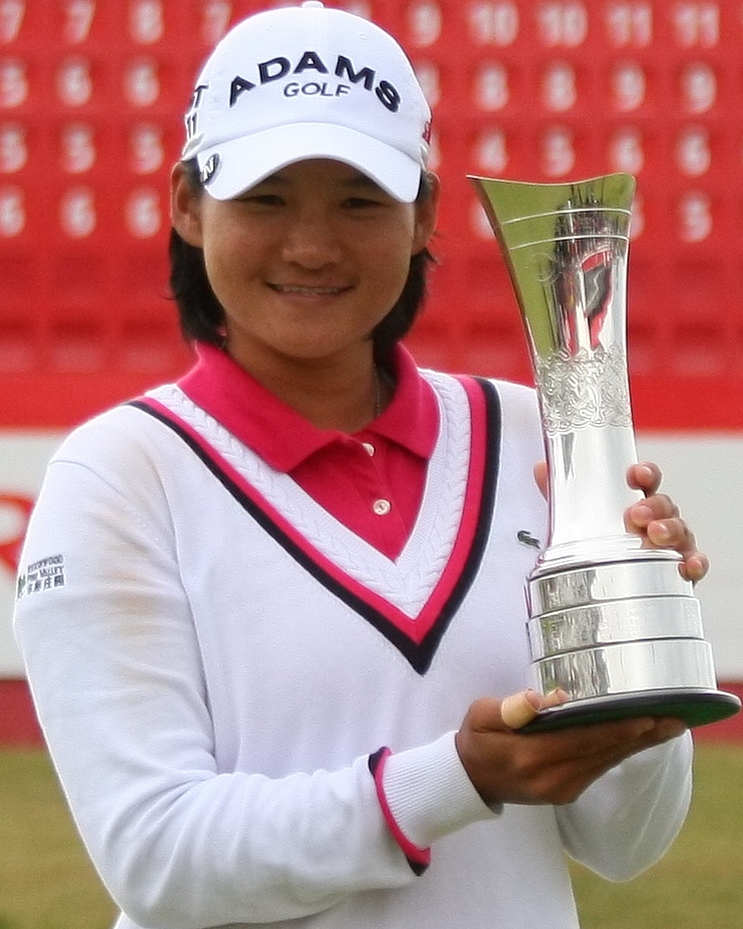
Yani Tseng won five majors in four years in the third era.

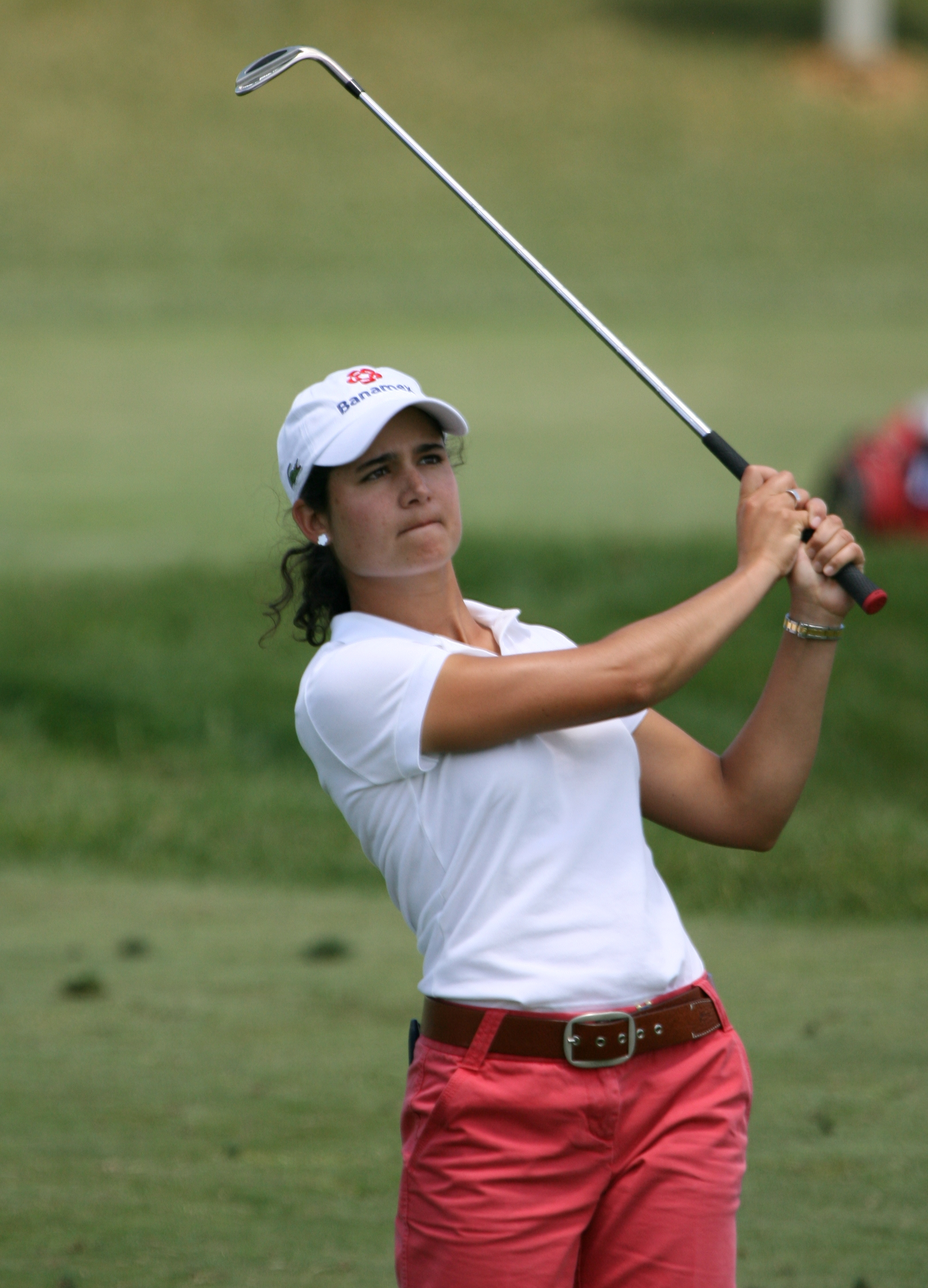
Lorena Ochoa won two women's majors.

Women's golf has a set of major championships, a series of tournaments designated to be of a higher status than other tournaments. Five tournaments are currently designated as 'majors' in women's golf by the LPGA.

The LPGA's list of majors has changed in constitution since the first major was held at the Women's Western Open in 1930. There have been four different periods, 1930 to 1972, 1973 to 2000, 2001 to 2013, and the current version which began in 2014. The current version of tournaments is the Chevron Championship, The Evian Championship, U.S. Women's Open, Women's PGA Championship, The Women's Open.

== LPGA majors ==
- In 2001, the du Maurier Classic, held in Canada, lost its primary sponsorship after that country passed severe restrictions on tobacco advertising. The tournament, now known as the Canadian Women's Open, is still a regular event on the LPGA Tour, but no longer designated as a major. The LPGA elevated the Women's British Open to major status to replace the du Maurier Classic.
- In 2013, The Evian Championship, held in Évian-les-Bains, France, became the fifth LPGA major. Known before 2013 as the Evian Masters, it is one of two events recognized as majors by the LPGA's European counterpart, the Ladies European Tour (LET). The elevation of this event to LPGA major status and the name change were announced by the LPGA on July 20, 2011.

As of 2023, the order in which women's majors are played is:

- Chevron Championship
- Women's PGA Championship
- U.S. Women's Open
- The Evian Championship
- The Women's Open

Before The Evian Championship became the fifth LPGA major, the setup of women's majors closely paralleled that of the men's majors. In both cases, the United States hosted three majors and the United Kingdom one.

The Evian Championship is held in France. The U.S. Open, The Open Championship, and the PGA Championship match their male equivalents. The Chevron Championship is the first major of the season and through 2022 was held at a single host course (the Mission Hills Country Club), similarly to the Masters Tournament, in 2023 it was held at The Club at Carlton Woods

Unlike the mainstream men's equivalents, all but one of the women's majors have title sponsors. Each of the five majors falls under a different jurisdiction. The LPGA organizes The Chevron Championship. Through 2014, it also organized the LPGA Championship, but since 2015 that tournament has been taken over by the PGA of America, the body that organizes the men's PGA Championship, and has been renamed the Women's PGA Championship. The U.S. Women's Open, is operated by the United States Golf Association. The Women's Open is operated by The R&A since a 2016 merger with the Ladies Golf Union. The Evian Championship is operated by the Ladies European Tour.

From 2006 through 2008, the winners of the four women's majors received automatic entry to the LPGA's season championship, the LPGA Tour Championship. Beginning in 2009, the Tour Championship extended entry to all players in the top 120 on the official LPGA Money List. Starting in 2011, the Tour Championship was replaced by the CME Group Titleholders; from that point through 2013, the top three finishers at all official tour events, including the majors, who had not already qualified for the Titleholders earned entries. Starting in 2014, the LPGA adopted a points race similar in some ways to the PGA Tour's FedEx Cup. In the new system, officially called the "Race to the CME Globe", the top 72 points earners during the season, plus all tournament winners, qualify for the renamed final event, the CME Group Tour Championship, in which the top nine points earners will have at least a mathematical chance of winning the season title.

=== History ===
Eight different events are classified as having been LPGA majors at some time. The number in each season has fluctuated between two and five. The first tournament which is now included in the LPGA's official list of major victories is the 1930 Women's Western Open, although this is a retrospective designation as the LPGA was not founded until 1950.·The Titleholders was played from 1937 to 1966 with a gap due to World War II. In 1967 there were three majors, then from 1968 to 1971 this decreased and went back to two majors. Then in 1979, the du Maurier Classic was first played and immediately considered a major leading to three majors again from 1979 to 1982. In 1983, when Nabisco Dinah Shore gained major championship status, there were four majors.

- Women's Western Open: 1930–1967
- Titleholders Championship: 1937–1942, 1946–1966, 1972
- U.S. Women's Open: 1946–present
- Women's PGA Championship: 1955–present (LPGA Championship, 1955–2014)
- du Maurier Classic: 1979–2000 (Peter Jackson Classic, 1979–1983)
- Chevron Championship: 1983–present (Nabisco Dinah Shore, 1983–1999; Nabisco Championship, 2000–2001; Kraft Nabisco Championship, 2002–2014; ANA Inspiration, 2015–2021)
- The Women's Open: 2001–present (Women's British Open, 2001-2019)
- The Evian Championship: 2013–present

== LPGA major winners ==
First era
Year	Women's Western Open	LPGA Championship	U.S. Women's Open	Titleholders Championship
1930	(United States) Lucia Mida (1/1)	tournament started in 1955	tournament started in 1946	tournament started in 1937
1931	(United States) June Beebe (1/2)	tournament started in 1955	tournament started in 1946	tournament started in 1937
1932	(United States) Jane Weiller (1/1)	tournament started in 1955	tournament started in 1946	tournament started in 1937
1933	(United States) June Beebe (2/2)	tournament started in 1955	tournament started in 1946	tournament started in 1937
1934	(United States) Marian McDougall (1/1)	tournament started in 1955	tournament started in 1946	tournament started in 1937
1935	(United States) Opal Hill (1/2)	tournament started in 1955	tournament started in 1946	tournament started in 1937
1936	(United States) Opal Hill (2/2)	tournament started in 1955	tournament started in 1946	tournament started in 1937
1937	(United States) Helen Hicks (1/2)	tournament started in 1955	tournament started in 1946	(United States) Patty Berg (1/15)
1938	(United States) Bea Barrett (1/1)	tournament started in 1955	tournament started in 1946	(United States) Patty Berg (2/15)
1939	(United States) Helen Dettweiler (1/1)	tournament started in 1955	tournament started in 1946	(United States) Patty Berg (3/15)
1940	(United States) Babe Zaharias (1/10)	tournament started in 1955	tournament started in 1946	(United States) Helen Hicks (2/2)
1941	(United States) Patty Berg (4/15)	tournament started in 1955	tournament started in 1946	(United States) Dorothy Kirby (1/2)
1942	(United States) Betty Jameson (1/3)	tournament started in 1955	tournament started in 1946	(United States) Dorothy Kirby (2/2)
1943	(United States) Patty Berg (5/15)	tournament started in 1955	tournament started in 1946	Not played (World War II)
1944	(United States) Babe Zaharias (2/10)	tournament started in 1955	tournament started in 1946	Not played (World War II)
1945	(United States) Babe Zaharias (3/10)	tournament started in 1955	tournament started in 1946	Not played (World War II)
1946	(United States) Louise Suggs (1/11)	tournament started in 1955	(United States) Patty Berg (6/15)	(United States) Louise Suggs (2/11)
1947	(United States) Louise Suggs (3/11)	tournament started in 1955	(United States) Betty Jameson (2/3)	(United States) Babe Zaharias (4/10)
1948	(United States) Patty Berg (7/15)	tournament started in 1955	(United States) Babe Zaharias (5/10)	(United States) Patty Berg (8/15)
1949	(United States) Louise Suggs (4/11)	tournament started in 1955	(United States) Louise Suggs (5/11)	(United States) Peggy Kirk (1/1)
1950	(United States) Babe Zaharias (6/10)	tournament started in 1955	(United States) Babe Zaharias (7/10)	(United States) Babe Zaharias (8/10)
1951	(United States) Patty Berg (9/15)	tournament started in 1955	(United States) Betsy Rawls (1/8)	(United States) Pat O'Sullivan (1/1)
1952	(United States) Betsy Rawls (2/8)	tournament started in 1955	(United States) Louise Suggs (5/11)	(United States) Babe Zaharias (9/10)
1953	(United States) Louise Suggs (7/11)	tournament started in 1955	(United States) Betsy Rawls (3/8)	(United States) Patty Berg (10/15)
1954	(United States) Betty Jameson (3/3)	tournament started in 1955	(United States) Babe Zaharias (10/10)	(United States) Louise Suggs (8/11)
1955	(United States) Patty Berg (11/15)	(United States) Beverly Hanson (1/3)	(Uruguay) Fay Crocker (1/2)	(United States) Patty Berg (12/15)
1956	(United States) Beverly Hanson (2/3)	(United States) Marlene Hagge (1/1)	(United States) Kathy Cornelius (1/1)	(United States) Louise Suggs (9/11)
1957	(United States) Patty Berg (13/15)	(United States) Louise Suggs (10/11)	(United States) Betsy Rawls (4/8)	(United States) Patty Berg (14/15)
1958	(United States) Patty Berg (15/15)	(United States) Mickey Wright (1/13)	(United States) Mickey Wright (2/13)	(United States) Beverly Hanson (3/3)
1959	(United States) Betsy Rawls (5/8)	(United States) Betsy Rawls (6/8)	(United States) Mickey Wright (3/13)	(United States) Louise Suggs (11/11)
1960	(United States) Joyce Ziske (1/1)	(United States) Mickey Wright (4/13)	(United States) Betsy Rawls (7/8)	(Uruguay) Fay Crocker (2/2)
1961	(United States) Mary Lena Faulk (1/1)	(United States) Mickey Wright (5/13)	(United States) Mickey Wright (6/13)	(United States) Mickey Wright (7/13)
1962	(United States) Mickey Wright (8/13)	(United States) Judy Kimball (1/1)	(United States) Murle Lindstrom (1/1)	(United States) Mickey Wright (9/13)
1963	(United States) Mickey Wright (10/13)	(United States) Mickey Wright (11/13)	(United States) Mary Mills (1/3)	(United States) Marilynn Smith (2/2)
1964	(United States) Carol Mann (1/2)	(United States) Mary Mills (2/3)	(United States) Mickey Wright (12/13)	(United States) Marilynn Smith (2/2)
1965	(United States) Susie Maxwell (1/4)	(United States) Sandra Haynie (1/4)	(United States) Carol Mann (2/2)	(United States) Kathy Whitworth (1/6)
1966	(United States) Mickey Wright (13/13)	(United States) Gloria Ehret (1/1)	(United States) Sandra Spuzich (1/1)	(United States) Kathy Whitworth (2/6)
1967	(United States) Kathy Whitworth (3/6)	(United States) Kathy Whitworth (4/6)	(France) Catherine Lacoste (1/1)	Not played
1968	Defunct	(Canada) Sandra Post (1/1)	(United States) Susie Berning (2/4)	Not played
1969	Defunct	(United States) Betsy Rawls (8/8)	(United States) Donna Caponi (1/4)	Not played
1970	Defunct	(United States) Shirley Englehorn (1/1)	(United States) Donna Caponi (2/4)	Not played
1971	Defunct	(United States) Kathy Whitworth (5/6)	(United States) JoAnne Carner (1/2)	Not played
1972	Defunct	(United States) Kathy Ahern (1/1)	(United States) Susie Berning (3/4)	(United States) Sandra Palmer (1/2)
Second era
Year	Nabisco Championship	LPGA Championship	U.S. Women's Open	du Maurier Classic
1973	Not considered a major until 1983	(United States) Mary Mills (3/3)	(United States) Susie Berning (4/4)	Not considered a major until 1979
1974	Not considered a major until 1983	(United States) Sandra Haynie (2/4)	(United States) Sandra Haynie (3/4)	Not considered a major until 1979
1975	Not considered a major until 1983	(United States) Kathy Whitworth (6/6)	(United States) Sandra Palmer (2/2)	Not considered a major until 1979
1976	Not considered a major until 1983	(United States) Betty Burfeindt (1/1)	(United States) JoAnne Carner (2/2)	Not considered a major until 1979
1977	Not considered a major until 1983	(Japan) Chako Higuchi (1/1)	(United States) Hollis Stacy (1/4)	Not considered a major until 1979
1978	Not considered a major until 1983	(United States) Nancy Lopez (1/3)	(United States) Hollis Stacy (2/4)	Not considered a major until 1979
1979	Not considered a major until 1983	(United States) Donna Caponi (3/4)	(United States) Jerilyn Britz (1/1)	(United States) Amy Alcott (1/5)
1980	Not considered a major until 1983	(South Africa) Sally Little (1/2)	(United States) Amy Alcott (2/5)	(United States) Pat Bradley (1/6)
1981	Not considered a major until 1983	(United States) Donna Caponi (4/4)	(United States) Pat Bradley (2/6)	(Australia) Jan Stephenson (1/3)
1982	Not considered a major until 1983	(Australia) Jan Stephenson (2/3)	(United States) Janet Anderson (1/1)	(United States) Sandra Haynie (4/4)
1983	(United States) Amy Alcott (3/5)	(United States) Patty Sheehan (1/6)	(Australia) Jan Stephenson (3/3)	(United States) Hollis Stacy (3/4)
1984	(United States) Juli Inkster (1/7)	(United States) Patty Sheehan (2/6)	(United States) Hollis Stacy (4/4)	(United States) Juli Inkster (2/7)
1985	(United States) Alice Miller (1/1)	(United States) Nancy Lopez (2/3)	(United States) Kathy Baker (1/1)	(United States) Pat Bradley (3/6)
1986	(United States) Pat Bradley (4/6)	(United States) Pat Bradley (5/6)	(United States) Jane Geddes (1/2)	(United States) Pat Bradley (6/6)
1987	(United States) Betsy King (1/6)	(United States) Jane Geddes (2/2)	(England) Laura Davies (1/4)	(United States) Jody Rosenthal (1/1)
1988	(United States) Amy Alcott (4/5)	(United States) Sherri Turner (1/1)	(Sweden) Liselotte Neumann (1/1)	(United States) Sally Little (2/2)
1989	(United States) Juli Inkster (3/7)	(United States) Nancy Lopez (3/3)	(United States) Betsy King (2/6)	(United States) Tammie Green (1/1)
1990	(United States) Betsy King (3/6)	(United States) Beth Daniel (1/1)	(United States) Betsy King (4/6)	(United States) Cathy Johnston (1/1)
1991	(United States) Amy Alcott (5/5)	(United States) Meg Mallon (1/4)	(United States) Meg Mallon (2/4)	(United States) Nancy Scranton (1/1)
1992	(United States) Dottie Mochrie (1/2)	(United States) Betsy King (5/6)	(United States) Patty Sheehan (3/6)	(United States) Sherri Steinhauer (1/2)
1993	(Sweden) Helen Alfredsson (1/1)	(United States) Patty Sheehan (4/6)	(United States) Lauri Merten (1/1)	(United States) Brandie Burton (1/2)
1994	(United States) Donna Andrews (1/1)	(England) Laura Davies (2/4)	(United States) Patty Sheehan (5/6)	(United States) Martha Nause (1/1)
1995	(United States) Nanci Bowen (1/1)	(United States) Kelly Robbins (1/1)	(Sweden) Annika Sörenstam (1/10)	(Peru) Jenny Lidback (1/1)
1996	(United States) Patty Sheehan (6/6)	(England) Laura Davies (3/4)	(Sweden) Annika Sörenstam (2/10)	(England) Laura Davies (4/4)
1997	(United States) Betsy King (6/6)	(United States) Christa Johnson (1/1)	(England) Alison Nicholas (1/1)	(United States) Colleen Walker (1/1)
1998	(United States) Pat Hurst (1/1)	(South Korea) Se Ri Pak (1/5)	(South Korea) Se Ri Pak (2/5)	(United States) Brandie Burton (2/2)
1999	(United States) Dottie Pepper (2/2)	(United States) Juli Inkster (4/7)	(United States) Juli Inkster (5/7)	(Australia) Karrie Webb (1/7)
2000	(Australia) Karrie Webb (2/7)	(United States) Juli Inkster (6/7)	(Australia) Karrie Webb (3/7)	(United States) Meg Mallon (3/4)
Third era
Year	Kraft Nabisco Championship	LPGA Championship	U.S. Women's Open	Women's British Open
2001	(Sweden) Annika Sörenstam (3/10)	(Australia) Karrie Webb (4/7)	(Australia) Karrie Webb (5/7)	(South Korea) Se Ri Pak (3/5)
2002	(Sweden) Annika Sörenstam (4/10)	(South Korea) Se Ri Pak (4/5)	(United States) Juli Inkster (7/7)	(Australia) Karrie Webb (6/7)
2003	(France) Patricia Meunier-Lebouc (1/1)	(Sweden) Annika Sörenstam (5/10)	(United States) Hilary Lunke (1/1)	(Sweden) Annika Sörenstam (6/10)
2004	(South Korea) Grace Park (1/1)	(Sweden) Annika Sörenstam (7/10)	(United States) Meg Mallon (4/4)	(England) Karen Stupples (1/1)
2005	(Sweden) Annika Sörenstam (8/10)	(Sweden) Annika Sörenstam (9/10)	(South Korea) Birdie Kim (1/1)	(South Korea) Jeong Jang (1/1)
2006	(Australia) Karrie Webb (7/7)	(South Korea) Se Ri Pak (5/5)	(Sweden) Annika Sörenstam (10/10)	(United States) Sherri Steinhauer (2/2)
2007	(United States) Morgan Pressel (1/1)	(Norway) Suzann Pettersen (1/2)	(United States) Cristie Kerr (1/2)	(Mexico) Lorena Ochoa (1/2)
2008	(Mexico) Lorena Ochoa (2/2)	(Taiwan) Yani Tseng (1/5)	(South Korea) Inbee Park (1/7)	(South Korea) Jiyai Shin (1/2)
2009	(United States) Brittany Lincicome (1/2)	(Sweden) Anna Nordqvist (1/3)	(South Korea) Ji Eun-hee (1/1)	(Scotland) Catriona Matthew (1/1)
2010	(Taiwan) Yani Tseng (2/5)	(United States) Cristie Kerr (2/2)	(United States) Paula Creamer (1/1)	(Taiwan) Yani Tseng (3/5)
2011	(United States) Stacy Lewis (1/2)	(Taiwan) Yani Tseng (4/5)	(South Korea) Ryu So-yeon (1/2)	(Taiwan) Yani Tseng (5/5)
2012	(South Korea) Sun-Young Yoo (1/1)	(China) Shanshan Feng (1/1)	(South Korea) Na Yeon Choi (1/1)	(South Korea) Jiyai Shin (2/2)

Fourth era
Year	Chevron Championship	U.S. Women's Open	Women's PGA Championship	The Evian Championship	The Women's Open
2013	(South Korea) Inbee Park (2/7)	(South Korea) Inbee Park (4/7)	(South Korea) Inbee Park (3/7)	(Norway) Suzann Pettersen (2/2)	(United States) Stacy Lewis (2/2)
2014	(United States) Lexi Thompson (1/1)	(United States) Michelle Wie (1/1)	(South Korea) Inbee Park (5/7)	(South Korea) Kim Hyo-joo (1/1)	(United States) Mo Martin (1/1)
2015	(United States) Brittany Lincicome (2/2)	(South Korea) Chun In-gee (1/3)	(South Korea) Inbee Park (6/7)	(New Zealand) Lydia Ko (1/3)	(South Korea) Inbee Park (7/7)
2016	(New Zealand) Lydia Ko (2/3)	(United States) Brittany Lang (1/1)	(Canada) Brooke Henderson (1/2)	(South Korea) Chun In-gee (2/3)	(Thailand) Ariya Jutanugarn (1/2)
2017	(South Korea) Ryu So-yeon (2/2)	(South Korea) Park Sung-hyun (1/2)	(United States) Danielle Kang (1/1)	(Sweden) Anna Nordqvist (2/3)	(South Korea) In-Kyung Kim (1/1)
2018	(Sweden) Pernilla Lindberg (1/1)	(Thailand) Ariya Jutanugarn (2/2)	(South Korea) Park Sung-hyun (1/2)	(United States) Angela Stanford (1/1)	(England) Georgia Hall (1/1)
2019	(South Korea) Ko Jin-young (1/2)	(South Korea) Lee Jeong-eun (1/1)	(Australia) Hannah Green (1/1)	(South Korea) Ko Jin-young (2/2)	(Japan) Hinako Shibuno (1/1)
2020	(South Korea) Mirim Lee (1/1)	(South Korea) Kim A-lim (1/1)	(South Korea) Kim Sei-young (1/1)	Not held due to coronavirus pandemic	(Germany) Sophia Popov (1/1)
2021	(Thailand) Patty Tavatanakit (1/1)	(Philippines) Yuka Saso (1/2)	(United States) Nelly Korda (1/4)	(Australia) Minjee Lee (1/3)	(Sweden) Anna Nordqvist (3/3)
2022	(United States) Jennifer Kupcho (1/1)	(Australia) Minjee Lee (2/3)	(South Korea) Chun In-gee (3/3)	(Canada) Brooke Henderson (2/2)	(South Africa) Ashleigh Buhai (1/1)
2023	(United States) Lilia Vu (1/2)	(United States) Allisen Corpuz (1/1)	(China) Yin Ruoning (1/1)	(France) Céline Boutier (1/1)	(United States) Lilia Vu (2/2)
2024	(United States) Nelly Korda (2/4)	(Japan) Yuka Saso (2/2)	(South Korea) Amy Yang (1/1)	(Japan) Ayaka Furue (1/1)	(New Zealand) Lydia Ko (3/3)
2025	(Japan) Mao Saigo (1/1)	(Sweden) Maja Stark (1/1)	(Australia) Minjee Lee (3/3)	(Australia) Grace Kim (1/1)	(Japan) Miyū Yamashita (1/1)
2026	(United States) Nelly Korda (3/4)	(United States) Nelly Korda (4/4)	(South Korea) Ryu Hae-ran (1/2)	(South Korea) Ryu Hae-ran (2/2)	(Japan) Shiho Kuwaki (1/1)

=== Major championships by golfer ===
Rank	Player	Country	Winning span	Total	Chevron C'ship	PGA C'ship	U.S. Open	British Open	du Maurier	Title- holders	Western Open	Evian C'ship
1	Patty Berg	United States	1937–1958	15	–	–	1	–	–	7	7	–
2	Mickey Wright	United States	1958–1966	13	–	4	4	–	–	2	3	–
3	Louise Suggs	United States	1946–1959	11	–	1	2	–	–	4	4	–
4	Annika Sörenstam	Sweden	1995–2006	10	3	3	3	1	–	–	–	–
4	Babe Zaharias	United States	1940–1954	10	–	–	3	–	–	3	4	–
6	Betsy Rawls	United States	1951–1969	8	–	2	4	–	–	–	2	–
7	Juli Inkster	United States	1984–2002	7	2	2	2	–	1	–	–	–
7	Karrie Webb	Australia	1999–2006	7	2	1	2	1	1	–	–	–
7	Inbee Park	South Korea	2008–2015	7	1	3	2	1	–	–	–	–
10	Pat Bradley	United States	1980–1986	6	1	1	1	–	3	–	–	–
10	Betsy King	United States	1987–1997	6	3	1	2	–	–	–	–	–
10	Patty Sheehan	United States	1983–1996	6	1	3	2	–	–	–	–	–
10	Kathy Whitworth	United States	1965–1975	6	–	3	–	–	–	2	1	–

=== The "Grand Slam" ===
No woman has completed a four-major Grand Slam, much less one with five majors. Babe Zaharias won all three majors contested in 1950 and Sandra Haynie won both majors in 1974.

During the four-major era, six women have completed a "Career Grand Slam" by winning four different majors. There are variations in the set of four tournaments involved as the players played in different eras. The six are: Pat Bradley; Juli Inkster; Annika Sörenstam; Louise Suggs; Karrie Webb; and Mickey Wright. During the five-major era, Inbee Park became the first woman to complete the "Career Grand Slam." Even though there has been some debate surrounding whether Park has actually accomplished this feat, as she won The Evian Championship in 2012 before it officially became a major in 2013, LPGA acknowledged Park to have successfully achieved a "Career Grand Slam." The LPGA recognizes Webb as its only "Super Career Grand Slam" winner, since she is the only golfer to have won five events recognized by the LPGA as majors. Before the elevation of The Evian Championship to major status, the following was required for a golfer to win the Super Career Grand Slam:

- The du Maurier Classic between 1979 and 2000, when it was recognized by the LPGA as a major;
- the Women's British Open in 2001 or later; and
- the other three then-existing majors.

Webb won the du Maurier Classic in 1999 and the Women's British Open in 2002.

=== Major champions by nationality ===
The table below shows the number of major championships won by golfers from various countries/regions.

Country	1930s	40s	50s	60s	70s	80s	90s	2000s	10s	20s	Total
United States	13	21	34	32	21	31	29	9	11	8	209
South Korea	–	–	–	–	–	–	2	9	20	7	38
Sweden	–	–	–	–	–	1	3	9	2	2	17
Australia	–	–	–	–	–	3	1	6	1	4	15
England	–	–	–	–	–	1	4	1	1	–	7
Japan	–	–	–	–	1	–	–	–	1	5	7
Taiwan	–	–	–	–	–	–	–	1	4	–	5
Canada	–	–	–	1	–	–	–	–	1	1	3
France	–	–	–	1	–	–	–	1	–	1	3
New Zealand	–	–	–	–	–	–	–	–	2	1	3
Thailand	–	–	–	–	–	–	–	–	2	1	3
Mexico	–	–	–	–	–	–	–	2	–	–	2
Norway	–	–	–	–	–	–	–	1	1	–	2
South Africa	–	–	–	–	–	1	–	–	–	1	2
Uruguay	–	–	1	1	–	–	–	–	–	–	2
China	–	–	–	–	–	–	–	–	1	1	2
Germany	–	–	–	–	–	–	–	–	–	1	1
Peru	–	–	–	–	–	–	1	–	–	–	1
Philippines	–	–	–	–	–	–	–	–	–	1	1
Scotland	–	–	–	–	–	–	–	1	–	–	1
Total	13	21	35	35	22	37	40	40	47	34	324

== Consecutive victories at a major championship ==
Nationality	Player	Major	#	Years
United States	Patty Berg	Titleholders Championship	3	1937, 1938, 1939
Sweden	Annika Sörenstam	LPGA Championship	3	2003, 2004, 2005
South Korea	Inbee Park	Women's PGA Championship	3	2013, 2014, 2015
United States	Opal Hill	Women's Western Open	2	1935, 1936
United States	Dorothy Kirby	Titleholders Championship	2	1941, 1942
United States	Babe Zaharias	Women's Western Open	2	1944, 1945
United States	Louise Suggs	Women's Western Open	2	1946, 1947
United States	Patty Berg	Women's Western Open	2	1957, 1958
United States	Mickey Wright	U.S. Women's Open	2	1958, 1959
United States	Mickey Wright	LPGA Championship	2	1960, 1961
United States	Mickey Wright	Titleholders Championship	2	1961, 1962
United States	Mickey Wright	Women's Western Open	2	1962, 1963
United States	Marilynn Smith	Titleholders Championship	2	1963, 1964
United States	Kathy Whitworth	Titleholders Championship	2	1965, 1966
United States	Donna Caponi	U.S. Women's Open	2	1969, 1970
United States	Susie Berning	U.S. Women's Open	2	1972, 1973
United States	Hollis Stacy	U.S. Women's Open	2	1977, 1978
United States	Patty Sheehan	LPGA Championship	2	1983, 1984
United States	Pat Bradley	du Maurier Classic	2	1985, 1986
United States	Betsy King	U.S. Women's Open	2	1989, 1990
Sweden	Annika Sörenstam	U.S. Women's Open	2	1995, 1996
United States	Juli Inkster	LPGA Championship	2	1999, 2000
Australia	Karrie Webb	U.S. Women's Open	2	2000, 2001
Sweden	Annika Sörenstam	Kraft Nabisco Championship	2	2001, 2002
Taiwan	Yani Tseng	Women's British Open	2	2010, 2011

== Multiple major victories in a calendar year ==
=== Three victories ===
- 1950: (United States) Babe Zaharias; Women's Western Open, U.S. Women's Open, and Titleholders Championship
- 1961: (United States) Mickey Wright; LPGA Championship, U.S. Women's Open, and Titleholders Championship
- 1986: (United States) Pat Bradley; Kraft Nabisco Championship, LPGA Championship, du Maurier Classic
- 2013: (South Korea) Inbee Park; Kraft Nabisco Championship, LPGA Championship, U.S. Women's Open

Note: These golfers are also included below in the Two victories section.

=== Two victories ===
==== Chevron Championship and U.S. Women's Open ====
- 1986: (United States) Pat Bradley
- 2005: (Sweden) Annika Sörenstam
- 2013: (South Korea) Inbee Park
- 2026: (United States) Nelly Korda

==== Chevron Championship and The Evian Championship ====
- 2019: (South Korea) Ko Jin-young

==== Chevron Championship and U.S. Women's Open ====
- 1990: (United States) Betsy King
- 2000: (Australia) Karrie Webb
- 2013: (South Korea) Inbee Park

==== Chevron Championship and Women's British Open ====
- 2010: (Taiwan) Yani Tseng
- 2023: (United States) Lilia Vu

==== LPGA Championship and U.S. Women's Open ====
- 1958: (United States) Mickey Wright
- 1961: (United States) Mickey Wright (2)
- 1974: (United States) Sandra Haynie
- 1991: (United States) Meg Mallon
- 1998: (South Korea) Se Ri Pak
- 1999: (United States) Juli Inkster
- 2001: (Australia) Karrie Webb
- 2013: (South Korea) Inbee Park

==== LPGA Championship and Women's British Open ====
- 2003: (Sweden) Annika Sörenstam
- 2011: (Taiwan) Yani Tseng
- 2015: (South Korea) Inbee Park

==== U.S. Women's Open and Women's British Open ====
- Never has occurred

==== LPGA Championship and The Evian Championship ====
- 2026: (South Korea) Ryu Hae-ran

==== Chevron Championship and du Maurier Classic ====
- 1984: (United States) Juli Inkster
- 1986: (United States) Pat Bradley

==== LPGA Championship and du Maurier Classic ====
- 1986: (United States) Pat Bradley
- 1996: (England) Laura Davies

==== U.S. Women's Open and du Maurier Classic ====
- Never occurred

==== Women's Western Open and LPGA Championship ====
- 1959: (United States) Betsy Rawls
- 1963: (United States) Mickey Wright
- 1967: (United States) Kathy Whitworth

==== Women's Western Open and U.S. Women's Open ====
- 1949: (United States) Louise Suggs
- 1950: (United States) Babe Zaharias

==== Women's Western Open and Titleholders Championship ====
- 1946: (United States) Louise Suggs
- 1948: (United States) Patty Berg
- 1950: (United States) Babe Zaharias
- 1955: (United States) Patty Berg
- 1957: (United States) Patty Berg
- 1962: (United States) Mickey Wright

==== LPGA Championship and Titleholders Championship ====
- 1961: (United States) Mickey Wright

==== U.S. Women's Open and Titleholders Championship ====
- 1950: (United States) Babe Zaharias
- 1961: (United States) Mickey Wright

== Record scores ==
The lowest score in relation to par recorded in a women's major championship was 21-under-par, by Chun In-gee at the 2016 Evian Championship. Chun also holds the record for lowest aggregate score for 72-holes, at 263, for her performance at that tournament. The single round scoring record is 60 held by Ryu Hae-ran at the 2026 Evian Championship. A score of 61 held by three golfers, Kim Hyo-joo at the 2014 Evian Championship, Lee Jeong-eun and Leona Maguire, both at 2021 Evian Championship. A score of 62 has been shot by Minea Blomqvist at the 2004 Women's British Open (third round), Lorena Ochoa at the 2006 Kraft Nabisco Championship (first round), and Mirim Lee at the 2016 Women's British Open (first round).

== Rolex Annika Major Award ==
In 2014, the LPGA established the yearly Rolex Annika Major Award to recognize the overall best performance in the LPGA majors. Points are awarded for top-10 finishes in each major: 60 points for first place, 24 for second, down to 2 points for tenth place. The major winner with the most points at the end of the season wins the award. It is named after Annika Sörenstam.

Year	Winner	Country	Points	Ref
2014	Michelle Wie	United States	84	
2015	Inbee Park	South Korea	144	
2016	Lydia Ko	New Zealand	102	
2017	Ryu So-yeon	South Korea	78	
2018	Ariya Jutanugarn	Thailand	88	
2019	Ko Jin-young	South Korea	138	
2021	Patty Tavatanakit	Thailand	80	
2022	Minjee Lee	Australia	98	
2023	Lilia Vu	United States	120	
2024	Nelly Korda	United States	84	
2025	Minjee Lee	Australia	78	
2026	Nelly Korda (2)	United States	140	

== Other regular tours ==
In men's (non-senior) golf, the four majors are agreed globally. All the principal tours acknowledge the status of the majors via their sponsorship of the Official World Golf Ranking, and the prize money is official on the three richest regular tours (the PGA, European, and Japanese tours). This is not the case in women's golf, but the significance of this is limited, as the LPGA Tour is much more dominant in women's golf than the PGA Tour is in men's golf. For example, the BBC has been known to use the LPGA definition of women's majors without qualifying it. Also, before the Evian Masters was elevated to major status, the Ladies' Golf Union, the governing body for women's golf in the UK and Republic of Ireland and the organiser of the Women's British Open, stated on its official site that the Women's British Open is "the only Women's Major to be played outside the U.S."

The Ladies European Tour does not sanction any of the LPGA majors which are played in the United States, and only has two events which it designates as majors on its schedule, namely the Women's British Open and The Evian Championship (historically the Evian Masters), which is played in France. The Ladies European Tour had long tacitly acknowledged the dominance of the LPGA Tour by not scheduling any of its events to conflict with any of the LPGA majors played in the U.S., but that changed slightly in 2008 when the LET scheduled a tournament opposite the LPGA Championship. Also, while the LPGA Tour did not recognize the then-Evian Masters as a major until 2013, it began co-sanctioning the tournament as a regular tour event in 2000. Because it was played the week before the Women's British Open (except in 2012, when the latter event was moved to September to avoid conflict with the London Olympics), and the purse was (and remains) one of the largest on the LPGA Tour, virtually all top LPGA players played the Evian Masters before its elevation to major status. The Evian Championship has now moved to September. (During the 2006–08 period, its winner also received an automatic berth in the LPGA Tour Championship.)

The LPGA of Japan Tour, which is the second richest women's golf tour, has its own set of four majors: the World Ladies, the Japan Open, the JLPGA Championship and the JLPGA Tour Championship. However, these events attract little notice outside Japan, and to a lesser degree South Korea (since a number of Koreans now play on the Japan tour).

== Epson Tour ==
From 2006 to 2019, the Symetra Tour, the LPGA's developmental tour known through 2011 as the Futures Tour, designated the Tate & Lyle Players Championship, an event which has been held since 1985, as a major championship. It was the Tour's first $100,000 purse.

== Women's senior golf ==
The Legends of the LPGA Tour, originally the Women's Senior Golf Tour, played its first season in 2001. The U.S. Senior Women's Open and the Senior LPGA Championship are considered to constitute the senior women's major golf championships.

The U.S. Senior Women's Open was established in 2018 and is open to women whose 50th birthday falls on or before the first day of competition. The eligibility for the Senior LPGA Championship, established in 2017, and the Legends of the LPGA Tour are for female golfers age 45 and older.

== See also ==
- Chronological list of LPGA major golf champions
