= 1955 LPGA Championship =

Coordinates: 41.015°N 85.199°W

Tournament information
- Dates: July 15–17, 1955
- Location: Fort Wayne, Indiana, U.S.
- Course: Orchard Ridge Country Club
- Tour: LPGA Tour
- Format: Stroke play - 54 holes Match play - 36 holes (final)

Statistics
- Par: 75
- Prize fund: $6,000
- Winner's share: $1,200

Champion
- (United States) Beverly Hanson
- 220 (−5), 4&3

Location in the United States
Location in Indiana

The 1955 LPGA Championship was the first edition of the LPGA Championship, held July 15–17 at Orchard Ridge Country Club in Fort Wayne, Indiana.

The championship's format was three rounds of stroke play, followed by match play on Sunday to determine the final standings. The championship match was played over 36 holes and the other matches were over 18 holes. Rain washed out play on Thursday and delayed the start to late morning on Friday; 36 holes were played on Saturday.

Beverly Hanson won the first of her three major championships at 4 & 3 over runner-up Louise Suggs.

== Final leaderboard ==
Sunday, July 17, 1955

Place	Player	Score	To par	Match play	Money ($)
1	(United States) Beverly Hanson	70-75-75=220	−5	4&3	1,200
2	(United States) Louise Suggs	74-74-75=223	−2	4&3	800
3	(Uruguay) Fay Crocker	71-75-78=224	−1	2&1	650
4	(United States) Jackie Pung	72-77-75=224	−1	2&1	525
5	(United States) Mary Lena Faulk	75-75-75=225	E	1 up	475
6	(United States) Betty Hicks	73-76-77=226	+1	1 up	400
7	(United States) Pat O'Sullivan	73-77-79=229	+4	2&1	350
8	(United States) Bonnie Randolph	75-72-79=226	+1	2&1	300
9	(United States) Betty Jameson	75-78-77=230	+5	6&5	250
10	(United States) Peggy Kirk Bell	77-74-78=229	+4	6&5	225
