= 1959 U.S. Women's Open =

Coordinates: 40.450°N 79.845°W

Tournament information
- Dates: June 25–27, 1959
- Location: Blackridge, Pennsylvania
- Course: Churchill Valley Country Club
- Organized by: USGA
- Tour: LPGA Tour
- Format: Stroke play – 72 holes

Statistics
- Par: 70
- Length: 6,200 yards (5,670 m)
- Field: 61, 40 after cut
- Cut: 164 (+24)
- Prize fund: $7,200
- Winner's share: $1,800

Champion
- (United States) Mickey Wright
- 287 (+7)

Location in the United States
Location in Pennsylvania

The 1959 U.S. Women's Open was the 14th U.S. Women's Open, held June 25–27 at Churchill Valley Country Club in Blackridge, Pennsylvania, a suburb east of Pittsburgh. It was the seventh edition conducted by the United States Golf Association (USGA).

Defending champion Mickey Wright won the second of her four U.S. Women's Open titles, two strokes ahead of runner-up Louise Suggs, a two-time champion. Suggs led after 36 holes, but a third round 75 pushed her four strokes back. Wright, age 24, putted well in the final round and was two-under after fifteen holes, but bogeyed the final three. She was the first of seven to successfully defend the championship, last accomplished by Karrie Webb in 2001. It was the third of 13 major championships for Wright.

In this competition, Patty Berg became the first woman to hit a hole-in-one during any USGA competition.

This was the third major in three years at Churchill Valley, which hosted the LPGA Championship in 1957 and 1958. The club closed in 2013.

== Final leaderboard ==
Saturday, June 27, 1959

Place	Player	Score	To par	Money ($)
1	(United States) Mickey Wright	72-75-69-71=287	+7	1,800
2	(United States) Louise Suggs	71-74-75-69=289	+9	1,200
T3	(United States) Marlene Hagge	71-76-73-72=292	+12	650
T3	(United States) Ruth Jessen	75-74-72-71=292	+12	650
T3	(United States) Joyce Ziske	75-73-72-72=292	+12	650
6	(United States) Patty Berg	72-75-75-74=296	+16	400
7	(United States) Betsy Rawls	76-73-72-76=297	+17	350
8	(United States) Murle MacKenzie	77-75-75-71=298	+18	300
9	(United States) Anne Sander (a)	75-76-75-73=299	+19	0
10	(United States) Jo Ann Prentice	77-74-77-74=302	+22	260
