= 1957 LPGA Championship =

Coordinates: 40.450°N 79.845°W

Tournament information
- Dates: June 6–10, 1957
- Location: Blackridge, Pennsylvania
- Course: Churchill Valley Country Club
- Tour: LPGA Tour
- Format: Stroke play – 72 holes

Statistics
- Par: 70
- Length: 5,711 yards (5,222 m)
- Field: 26 players
- Cut: none
- Prize fund: $7,600
- Winner's share: $1,316

Champion
- (United States) Louise Suggs
- 285 (+5)

Location in the United States
Location in Pennsylvania

The 1957 LPGA Championship was the third LPGA Championship, held June 6–10 at Churchill Valley Country Club in Blackridge, Pennsylvania, a suburb east of Pittsburgh. It concluded on Monday, after rain washed out play on Saturday.

Louise Suggs, president of the LPGA, shot a final round 68 (−2) to win her only LPGA Championship, three strokes ahead of runner-up Wiffi Smith. Defending champion Marlene Hagge and 1955 winner Beverly Hanson finished two strokes behind Smith, in a tie for third. Smith, age 20, led after each of the first three rounds, but carded a 74 (+4) in the final round on Monday. She won eight events on the LPGA Tour in her career, but no majors. It was the tenth of eleven major titles for Suggs.

The field consisted of 26 professionals; a concurrent event for amateurs was also held. The championship returned to Churchill Valley the next year in 1958 and the course hosted its third major the following year, the U.S. Women's Open in 1959. The club closed in 2013.

== Final leaderboard ==
Monday, June 10, 1957

Place	Player	Score	To par	Money ($)
1	(United States) Louise Suggs	69-74-74-68=285	+5	1,316
2	(United States) Wiffi Smith	68-71-75-74=288	+8	921
T3	(United States) Marlene Hagge	69-75-73-73=290	+10	698
T3	(United States) Beverly Hanson	75-73-73-69=290	+10	698
5	(United States) Joyce Ziske	71-73-75-74=293	+13	557
6	(United States) Marilynn Smith	76-70-75-73=294	+14	473
7	(United States) Patty Berg	73-72-77-73=295	+15	404
T8	(United States) Alice Bauer	74-71-74-77=296	+16	303
T8	(United States) Bonnie Randolph	76-76-69-75=296	+16	303
10	(United States) Kathy Cornelius	77-72-73-75=297	+17	228
