= French Lick Open =

Golf tournament formerly on the LPGA Tour

The French Lick Open was a golf tournament on the LPGA Tour, played only in 1958. It was played at the French Lick-Sheraton Hotel Country Club in French Lick, Indiana. Louise Suggs won the event.
