= Golden Circle of Golf Festival =

Golf tournament formerly on the LPGA Tour

The Golden Circle of Golf Festival was a golf tournament on the LPGA Tour, played only in 1961. It was played at the DeSota Lakes Golf & Country Club in Sarasota, Florida. Louise Suggs won the event.
