= Youngstown Kitchens Trumbull Open =

Golf tournament formerly on the LPGA Tour

The Youngstown Kitchen Trumbull Open was a golf tournament on the LPGA Tour, played only in 1960. It was played at the Trumbull Country Club in Warren, Ohio. Louise Suggs won the event.
