= Oklahoma City Golf & Country Club =

Country club in Nichols Hills, Oklahoma

Coordinates: 35.5458°N 97.5422°W

- Interactive map of Oklahoma City Golf & Country Club

Club information
- Location: Nichols Hills, Oklahoma, U.S.
- Established: 1911
- Type: Private
- Total holes: 18
- Designed by: Perry Maxwell and Alister MacKenzie
- Par: 71
- Length: 6,861 yd (6,274 m); Longest hole is #5 – 597 yd (546 m)
- Course rating: 73.5
- Slope rating: 130

Oklahoma City Golf & Country Club is a private golf and country club located in Nichols Hills, Oklahoma.

== Course founding ==
The course was founded in 1911 by 300 Oklahoma City residents. The course, designed by architect Perry Maxwell, measures 6,861 yards from the championship tees and plays to a par 71 with a course rating of 73.5 and a slope of 130. The course features tree-lined fairways throughout the rolling hills. Eleven of the holes have water hazards in play—either ponds or winding creeks—to challenge even the finest players. The course has been recognized by Golf Digest as one of the state's premier courses.

== Tournaments hosted ==
The Club has hosted several regional and national tournaments, including:

- 1953 U.S. Amateur (Gene Littler beat Dale Morey on the last hole)
- Oklahoma City Open (1926, 1927, 1928, 1929)
- 1930 Southwest Invitational Amateur
- Trans-Mississippi Amateur (six times dating back to 1932)
- Women's Southern Open (1936)
- 1937 Oklahoma Four Ball
- Western Amateur (1939)
- Women's Western Open (1949 Women's Western Open)
- NCAA Division I Southwest Regional (1994)
- Numerous men's and women's U.S. Amateur qualifying tournaments
- Numerous U.S. Open qualifying tournaments

== Scorecard ==
Tee	Rating/Slope	1	2	3	4	5	6	7	8	9	Out	10	11	12	13	14	15	16	17	18	In	Total
Black	73.5/130	384	416	180	450	597	174	447	313	478	3439	404	201	321	563	405	148	503	438	439	3422	6861
Blue	70.7/124	350	379	161	399	549	167	404	286	411	3106	345	173	300	540	393	129	495	377	407	3209	6315
Par	Par	4	4	3	4	5	3	4	4	4	35	4	3	4	5	4	3	5	4	4	36	71
