= 1952 U.S. Women's Open =

Coordinates: 39.994°N 75.223°W

Tournament information
- Dates: June 26–29, 1952
- Location: Philadelphia, Pennsylvania
- Course: Bala Golf Club
- Organized by: LPGA Tour and The Philadelphia Inquirer; Charities, Inc.
- Tour: LPGA Tour
- Format: Stroke play – 72 holes

Statistics
- Par: 69
- Length: 5,460 yards (4,993 m)
- Field: 45: 14 pros, 31 amateurs
- Prize fund: $7,500
- Winner's share: $1,750

Champion
- (United States) Louise Suggs
- 284 (+8)

Location in the United States

The 1952 U.S. Women's Open was the seventh U.S. Women's Open, held June 26–29 at Bala Golf Club in Philadelphia, Pennsylvania. It was the final time the event was organized by the LPGA Tour; the United States Golf Association (USGA) has conducted the championship since 1953.

Louise Suggs, the 1949 champion, won the second of her two U.S. Women's Open titles, seven strokes ahead of runners-up Marlene Bauer and Betty Jameson. It was the sixth of eleven major championships for Suggs, whose lead after 36 holes was four strokes, and extended to seven strokes after the third round.

The championship was played in hot weather; temperatures in the first round on Thursday exceeded 100 °F (38 °C).

== Final leaderboard ==
Sunday, June 29, 1952

Place	Player	Score	To par	Money ($)
1	(United States) Louise Suggs	70-69-70-75=284	+8	1,750
T2	(United States) Marlene Bauer	83-70-67-71=291	+15	1,120
T2	(United States) Betty Jameson	71-73-72-75=291	+15	1,120
4	(United States) Beverly Hanson	76-73-75-69=293	+17	770
T5	(United States) Peggy Kirk Bell	77-75-70-73=295	+19	560
T5	(United States) Betty Mackinnon	74-72-73-76=295	+19	560
7	(United States) Betsy Rawls	72-72-78-75=297	+21	350
8	(United States) Alice Bauer	76-72-80-70=298	+22	245
9	(United States) Patty Berg	69-77-79-74=299	+23	210
10	(United States) Dorothy Germain Porter (a)	72-78-76-74 =300	+24	0
