= 1949 Grand National =

English steeplechase horse race

- Grand National
- Location: Aintree Racecourse
- Date: 26 March 1949
- Winning horse: Russian Hero
- Starting price: 66/1
- Jockey: Leo McMorrow
- Trainer: George R. Owen
- Owner: Fearnie Williamson
- Conditions: Slightly firm

External videos
- Highlights of the 1949 Grand National (British Pathé)

The 1949 Grand National was the 103rd renewal of the Grand National horse race that took place at Aintree Racecourse near Liverpool, England, on 26 March 1949.

The race was won by a 66/1 shot Russian Hero, a comfortable eight lengths ahead of his nearest challenger. Russian Hero was ridden by jockey Leo McMorrow and trained by George Owen, winning the top prize of £13,000 for owner Fearnie Williamson.

Forty-three horses ran; Roimond finished second, with Royal Mount third and Cromwell fourth.

Bora's Cottage was a fatality on the second circuit.

== Finishing order ==
Position	Name	Jockey	Age	Handicap (st-lb)	SP	Distance
01	Russian Hero	Leo McMorrow	9	10-8	66/1	8 lengths
02	Roimond	Dick Francis	8	11-12	22/1	1 Length
03	Royal Mount	Patrick Doyle	10	10-12	18/1	
04	Cromwell	Anthony Mildmay	8	11-3	6/1	
05	Flaming Steel	Joe Spencer	8	10-9	33/1	
06	Happy Home	Bryan Marshall	10	11-10	10/1	
07	Tonderman	Jack Bloom	12	10-4	66/1	
08	Lucky Purchase	Alec Jack	11	10-2	50/1	
09	Bricett	Tim Molony	12	10-9	20/1	
10	Clyduffe	Jimmy Power	14	10-0	66/1	
11	Perfect Night	Derek Ancil	11	10-0	66/1	Last to complete

== Non-finishers ==
Fence	Name	Jockey	Age	Handicap (st-lb)	SP	Fate
07	Cloncarrig	Kevin Gilsenan	9	11-7	18/1	Fell
24	Ulster Monarch	Dick Curran	10	11-2	28/1	Fell
09	Cavaliero	Jimmy Brogan	8	11-1	100/8	Fell
09	Acthon Major	Bobby O'Ryan	9	10-11	50/1	Fell
01	Caddie II	Jack Maguire	11	10-10	66/1	Fell
?	Leap Man	Ernest Vinall	12	10-10	66/1	Fell
21	Bruno II	Scotty Pringle	9	10-9	66/1	Fell
?	San Michele	Jack Boddy	9	10-5	66/1	Fell
25	Astra	Arthur Thompson	8	10-4	50/1	Fell
?	Magnetic Fin	Lionel Vick	10	10-4	50/1	Fell
?	Loyal Antrim	Mr A Scannell	12	10-4	50/1	Fell
17+	Bora's Cottage	E Kennedy	11	10-3	50/1	Fell
19	Monaveen	Tony Grantham	8	10-3	50/1	Fell
22	Wot No Sun	Glen Kelly	7	10-3	40/1	Fell
?	Replica	Eddie Reavey	11	10-3	66/1	Fell
?	Arranbeg	R McCarthy	12	10-2	66/1	Fell
?	Martin M	Major WH Skrine	9	10-1	66/1	Fell
24	Southborough	Patrick Murray	11	10-1	66/1	Fell
01	Stone Cottage	Matt Hogan	8	10-1	66/1	Fell
?	Celtic Cross	J Parkin	11	10-0	66/1	Fell
?	Morning Star II	George Bowden	10	10-0	66/1	Fell
?	Ship's Bell	Mick O'Dwyer	9	10-0	66/1	Fell
?	Offaly Prince	Mr A Parker	10	10-4	66/1	Fell
?	Barn Dance	Eddie Newman	10	10-0	50/1	Fell
01	Parthenon	Bobby Bates	10	10-5	66/1	Fell
?	Sagacity	Alan Power	11	10-0	66/1	Fell
24	Brighter Sandy	Bob Turnell	11	11-2	40/1	Brought Down
?	Gallery	George Slack	11	10-8	40/1	Brought Down
?	Ardnacassa	R Connors	11	10-5	66/1	Brought Down
?	Sen Toi	Tommy Cusack	14	10-5	66/1	Brought Down
22	Royal Cottage	Dicky Black	9	10-12	33/1	Refused
04	Caughoo	Daniel McCann	10	11-0	66/1	Ran Out
