= 1946 Women's Western Open =

Golf tournament

Coordinates: 41.5504°N 93.6417°W

Tournament information
- Dates: June 24–29, 1946
- Location: Des Moines, Iowa
- Course: Wakonda Club
- Format: Stroke play/match play

Statistics
- Par: 75
- Length: 6,416 yards (5,867 m)
- Field: 123 players, 32 to match play
- Cut: 93 (+18)

Champion
- Louise Suggs
- def. Patty Berg, 2 up
- Location within the United States Location within Iowa

The 1946 Women's Western Open was a golf competition held at the Wakonda Club in Des Moines, Iowa from June 24–29. It was the 17th edition of the Women's Western Open.

The field of 123 golfers played an 18-hole qualifying round to determine the 32 players advancing to match play. Patty Berg and Louise Suggs shared medalists honors with qualifying rounds of 79 (+4). Match play was over 18 holes for each round except the 36-hole final. After the first round of match play, three professional and thirteen amateur golfers remained in the field.

Louise Suggs won the championship in match play competition by defeating Patty Berg in the final match, 2 up.

== Final 16 bracket ==
Round of 16; June 26
Louise Suggs (a)	3&1
Lucile Mann (a)
Phyllis Otto (a)	3&2
Kathleen Carey (a)
Betty Jameson	3&2
Shirley Spork (a)
Babe Zaharias (a)	6&5
Jean Hutto (a)
Patty Berg	1up
Betty Hicks
Marjorie Row (a)	3&2
Carol Freese (a)
Dorothy Kirby (a)	5&3
Catherine Fox Park (a)
Nell Staats (a)	1up
Betty Jane Haemerle (a)

Quarterfinals; June 27
Louise Suggs (a)	3&1
Phyllis Otto (a)
Betty Jameson
Babe Zaharias (a)	3&2
Patty Berg	6&4
Marjorie Row (a)
Dorothy Kirby (a)	4&3
Nell Staats (a)

Semifinals; June 28
Louise Suggs (a)	1up
Babe Zaharias (a)
Patty Berg	1up
Dorothy Kirby (a)

Finals; June 29
Louise Suggs (a)	2up
Patty Berg
