= Oklahoma City Open (LPGA Tour) =

Golf tournament formerly on the LPGA Tour

The Oklahoma City Open was a golf tournament on the LPGA Tour, played only in 1955. It was played at Lincoln Park Golf Course in Oklahoma City, Oklahoma. Louise Suggs won the event.
