= 1952 Titleholders Championship =

Golf tournament in Augusta, Georgia, US

The 1952 Titleholders Championship was contested from March 13–16 at Augusta Country Club. It was the 13th edition of the Titleholders Championship.

Babe Zaharias won her third Titleholders.

== Final leaderboard ==
Place	Player	Score	To par
1	(United States) Babe Zaharias	74-73-73-79=299	+11
2	(United States) Betsy Rawls	77-75-76-78=306	+18
T3	(United States) Patty Berg	79-75-77-76=307	+19
T3	(United States) Marilynn Smith	78-77-76-76=307	+19
T5	(United States) Chris Doran (a)	77-79-76-77=309	+21
T5	(United States) Louise Suggs	77-76-74-82=309	+21
7	(United States) Mary Lena Faulk (a)	79-76-75-83=313	+25
T8	(United States) Betty Jameson	81-78-76-80=315	+27
T8	(United States) Dorothy Kirby (a)	79-78-81-77=315	+27
10	(United States) Alice Bauer	78-78-80-81=317	+29
