= Betty Jameson Open =

Golf tournament

The Betty Jameson Open was a golf tournament on the LPGA Tour, played only in 1952. It was played at the Brackenridge Park Golf Club in San Antonio, Texas. Louise Suggs won the event.
