= 1947 Women's Western Open =

Golf tournament

Coordinates: 33.7612°N 84.3881°W

Tournament information
- Dates: June 16–21, 1947
- Location: Atlanta, Georgia
- Course: Capital City Club
- Format: Stroke play/match play

Statistics
- Par: 76
- Field: 94 players, 32 to match play
- Cut: 92 (+16)

Champion
- Louise Suggs
- def. Dorothy Kirby, 4 & 2
- Location within the United States Location within Georgia

The 1947 Women's Western Open was a golf competition held at Capital City Club in Atlanta, Georgia from June 16–21. It was the 18th edition of the Women's Western Open.

The field of 94 golfers played an 18-hole qualifying round to determine the 32 players advancing to match play. Grace Lenczyk won medalist honors with a qualifying round of 77 (+1). Match play was over 18 holes for each round except the 36-hole final. After the first round of match play, five professional and eleven amateur golfers remained in the field.

Louise Suggs won the championship in match play competition by defeating Dorothy Kirby in the final match, 4 and 2. It was the last win by an amateur in the event.

== Final 16 bracket ==
Round of 16; June 22
Grace Lenczyk (a) | 5&4
Peggy Kirk (a)
Betty Jameson | 5&4
Helen Dettweiler
Dorothy Kirby (a) | 5&4
Mary Lena Faulk (a)
Dot Kielty (a) | 1up
Lee Bongart (a)
Polly Riley (a) | 5&3
Opal Hill
Patty Berg | 1up
Eileen Stulb (a)
Louise Suggs (a) | 4&3
Hope Seignious
Marjorie Lindsay (a) | 6&4
Margaret Maddox (a)

Quarterfinals; June 23
Grace Lenczyk (a) | 1up
Betty Jameson
Dorothy Kirby (a) | 1up
Dot Kielty (a)
Polly Riley (a)
Patty Berg | 5&4
Louise Suggs (a) | 5&3
Marjorie Lindsay (a)

Semifinals; June 24
Grace Lenczyk (a)
Dorothy Kirby (a) | 6&5
Patty Berg
Louise Suggs (a) | 1up

Finals; June 25
Dorothy Kirby (a)
Louise Suggs (a) | 4&2
