= Stockton Open =

Golf tournament formerly on the LPGA Tour

The Stockton Open was a golf tournament on the LPGA Tour, played only in 1952. It was played in Stockton, California. Louise Suggs won the event.
