= Palm Springs Open =

Former golf tournament (1953)

The Palm Springs Open was a golf tournament on the LPGA Tour, played only in 1953. It was played at the Tamarisk Country Club in Palm Springs, California. American Jackie Pung won the event.
