= Max McCready =

Irish golfer (1918–1994)

Personal information
- Full name: Samuel Maxwell McCready
- Nationality: Northern Ireland
- Born: 8 March 1918 Belfast, Ireland
- Died: 1994 (aged 76) South Africa

Career
- Sport: Golf
- Status: Amateur
- British Amateur: Won: 1949

Samuel Maxwell McCready (8 March 1918 – 1994) was an Irish amateur golfer. He won the 1949 Amateur Championship and was in the British Walker Cup team in 1949 and 1951.

McCready lived near the Dunmurry golf course, near Belfast, where he learnt his golf. During World War II he served in the Royal Air Force. McCready moved to South Africa in 1959 where he worked for McAlpine Construction. He died in South Africa in 1994. His widow Joan died in 2015 aged 109.

== Amateur wins ==
- 1947 RAF Championship
- 1948 Jamaican Amateur Championship
- 1949 The Amateur Championship

== Major championships ==
=== Wins (1) ===
Year	Championship	Winning score	Runner-up
1949	Amateur Championship	2 & 1	(United States) Willie Turnesa

== Team appearances ==
- Walker Cup (representing Great Britain): 1949, 1951
