= 1954 Titleholders Championship =

Golf tournament in Augusta, Georgia, US

The 1954 Titleholders Championship was contested from March 11–14 at Augusta Country Club. It was the 15th edition of the Titleholders Championship.

Louise Suggs won her second Titleholders. Her score of 293 broke the scoring record by one stroke, set by runner-up Patty Berg in 1953.

== Final leaderboard ==
Place	Player	Score	To par	Money ($)
1	(United States) Louise Suggs	73-71-76-73=293	+5	1,000
2	(United States) Patty Berg	74-76-73-77=300	+12	600
3	(United States) Babe Zaharias	76-70-80-76=302	+14	400
4	(United States) Betsy Rawls	76-77-71-79=303	+15	300
5	(United States) Marlene Bauer	79-76-74-75=304	+16	200
T6	(United States) Betty Dodd	77-74-77-78=306	+18	138
T6	(United States) Betty MacKinnon	79-73-78-76=306	+18	138
8	(United States) Betty Jameson	75-76-81-75=307	+19	100
9	(United States) Barbara Romack (a)	75-76-78-80=309	+21	0
10	(United States) Mickey Wright (a)	76-79-75-80=310	+22	0
