= 1953 Women's Western Open =

Golf tournament

Coordinates: 33.7612°N 84.3881°W

Tournament information
- Dates: June 15–20, 1953
- Location: Atlanta, Georgia
- Course: Capital City Club
- Tour: LPGA Tour
- Format: Stroke play/match play

Statistics
- Par: 76
- Length: 6,339 yards (5,796 m)
- Field: 75 players, 32 to match play
- Cut: 91 (+15)
- Prize fund: $1,500
- Winner's share: $1,000

Champion
- Louise Suggs
- def. Patty Berg, 6 & 5
- Location within the United States Location within Georgia

The 1953 Women's Western Open was a golf competition held at Capital City Club in Atlanta, Georgia from June 15–20, 1953. it was the 24th edition of the Women's Western Open.

The field of 75 golfers played an 18-hole qualifying round to determine the 32 players advancing to match play. Louise Suggs, Jackie Pung, and Claire Doran tied for medalist honors with a qualifying rounds of 75 (−1). Match play was over 18 holes for each round except the 36-hole final. After the first round of match play, eight professional and eight amateur golfers remained in the field.

Louise Suggs won the championship in match play competition by defeating Patty Berg in the final match, 6 and 5. Suggs earned $1,000 and Berg earned $500 from the $1,500 purse.

== Final 16 bracket ==
Round of 16; June 17
Louise Suggs | 4&3
Marnie Polk (a)
Pat Grant (a) | 6&5
Madge McDonald (a)
Pat Lesser (a) | 1up
Jackie Pung
Jean Hopkins (a) | 2&1
Bonnie Randolph
Claire Doran (a) | 6&4
Marilynn Smith
Patty Berg | 2up
Betsy Rawls
Betty Hicks | 2&1
Betty MacKinnon
Dot Kirby (a) | 6&5
Jo Ann Prentice (a)

Quarterfinals; June 18
Louise Suggs | 5&3
Pat Grant (a)
Pat Lesser (a) | 8&7
Jean Hopkins (a)
Claire Doran (a)
Patty Berg | 5&3
Betty Hicks
Dot Kirby (a) | 3&2

Semifinals; June 19
Louise Suggs | 4&3
Pat Lesser (a)
Patty Berg | 4&2
Dot Kirby (a)

Finals; June 20
Louise Suggs | 6&5
Patty Berg
