= San Diego Open (LPGA Tour) =

Golf tournament formerly on the LPGA Tour

The San Diego Open was a golf tournament on the LPGA Tour, played in 1953. It was played at the Mission Course in San Diego, California. Louise Suggs was the winner.
