= Los Angeles Open (LPGA Tour) =

Golf tournament on the LPGA Tour

The Los Angeles Open was a golf tournament on the LPGA Tour, played only in 1955. It was played at the Inglewood Country Club in Inglewood, California. Louise Suggs won the event.
