= 1956 Titleholders Championship =

Golf tournament in Augusta, Georgia, US

The 1956 Titleholders Championship was contested from March 8–11 at Augusta Country Club. It was the 17th edition of the Titleholders Championship.

Louise Suggs won her third Titleholders.

== Final leaderboard ==
Place	Player	Score	To par	Money ($)
1	(United States) Louise Suggs	78-75-75-74=302	+14	900
2	(United States) Patty Berg	79-77-73-74=303	+15	675
T3	(United States) Betsy Rawls	79-75-72-80=306	+18	445
T3	(United States) Mickey Wright	80-79-74-73=306	+18	445
5	(United States) Betty Jameson	80-74-77-78=309	+21	405
T6	(United States) Mary Lena Faulk	82-79-74-76=311	+23	338
T6	(United States) Beverly Hanson	84-75-75-77=311	+23	338
T8	(Uruguay) Fay Crocker	92-70-76-75=313	+25	248
T8	(United States) Marlene Hagge	78-80-79-76=313	+25	248
T10	(United States) Vonnie Colby	80-79-78-78=315	+27	113
T10	(United States) Joyce Ziske	83-82-77-73=315	+27	113
