= 1959 Titleholders Championship =

Golf tournament in Augusta, Georgia, US

The 1959 Titleholders Championship was contested from March 12–15 at Augusta Country Club. It was the 20th edition of the Titleholders Championship.

Louise Suggs won her fourth Titleholders.

== Final leaderboard ==
Place	Player	Score	To par	Money ($)
1	(United States) Louise Suggs	78-73-75-71=297	+9	1,000
2	(United States) Betsy Rawls	78-76-74-70=298	+10	750
3	(United States) Wiffi Smith	75-76-75-77=303	+15	550
4	(United States) Mary Lena Faulk	79-77-79-73=308	+20	450
T5	(United States) Betty Dodd	81-77-77-74=309	+21	317
T5	(United States) Mickey Wright	77-75-78-79=309	+21	317
T5	(United States) Joyce Ziske	78-76-77-78=309	+21	317
T8	(United States) Patty Berg	81-80-74-75=310	+22	225
T8	(Uruguay) Fay Crocker	76-76-80-78=310	+22	225
T8	(United States) Marlene Hagge	80-78-75-77=310	+22	225
