= Cross Country 144 Hole Weathervane =

Golf tournament formerly on the LPGA Tour

The Cross Country 144 Hole Weathervane was a golf tournament on the LPGA Tour from 1950 to 1953. The tournament consisted of four 36-hole legs played over several weeks. Each leg was also considered an official LPGA event.

== Winners ==
1953

Tournament	Winner	Venue	Location
Boca Raton Weathervane	Beverly Hanson	Boca Raton Hotel and Club	Boca Raton, Florida
Phoenix Weathervane	Patty Berg & Louise Suggs (tie)		Phoenix, Arizona
San Francisco Weathervane	Louise Suggs	Presidio Club	San Francisco, California
Philadelphia Weathervane	Louise Suggs	Whitemarsh Valley Country Club	Philadelphia, Pennsylvania
144 Hole Weathervane	Louise Suggs		

1952

Tournament	Winner	Venue	Location
Miami Weathervane	Babe Zaharias	Normandy Shores Country Club	Miami Beach, Florida
Houston Weathervane	Betsy Rawls	Brae Burn Country Club	Houston, Texas
Seattle Weathervane	Betsy Rawls	Broadmoor Golf Club	Seattle, Washington
New York Weathervane	Patty Berg	Scarsdale Golf Club; Deepdale Country Club	Hartsdale, New York; Great Neck, New York
Cross Country 144 Hole Weathervane	Betsy Rawls		

1951

Tournament	Winner	Venue	Location
Lakewood Weathervane	Babe Zaharias	Lakewood Country Club	Dallas, Texas
Pebble Beach Weathervane	Patty Berg	Pebble Beach Country Club	Pebble Beach, California
Meridian Hills Weathervane	Babe Zaharias	Meridian Hills Country Club	Indianapolis, Indiana
New York Weathervane	Patty Berg	Knollwood Country Club	White Plains, New York
144 Hole Weathervane	Patty Berg	Scarsdale Golf Club; Deepdale Country Club	Hartsdale, New York; Great Neck, New York

1950

Tournament	Winner	Venue	Location
Pebble Beach Weathervane	Babe Zaharias	Pebble Beach Country Club	Pebble Beach, California
Chicago Weathervane	Louise Suggs	Sky Crest Country Club	Chicago, Illinois
Cleveland Weathervane	Babe Zaharias	Ridgewood Country Club	Cleveland, Ohio
New York Weathervane	Louise Suggs	Knollwood Country Club	White Plains, New York
144 Hole Weathervane	Babe Zaharias		
