= Carrollton Open =

US golf tournament

The Carrollton Open was a golf tournament on the LPGA Tour from 1950 to 1955. It was played at the Sunset Hills Country Club in Carrollton, Georgia.

== Winners ==
Carrollton Open

- 1955 Betsy Rawls

Carrollton Georgia Open

- 1954 Louise Suggs

Carrollton Tournament

- 1952 Betsy Rawls

Carrollton Georgia Open

- 1951 Louise Suggs

Sunset Hills Open

- 1950 Patty Berg
