= 1949 Women's Western Open =

Golf tournament

Coordinates: 35.5458°N 97.5422°W

Tournament information
- Dates: June 20–25, 1949
- Location: Nichols Hills, Oklahoma
- Course: Oklahoma City Golf & Country Club
- Format: Stroke play/match play

Statistics
- Par: 75
- Length: 6,679 yards (6,107 m)
- Field: 116 players, 32 to match play
- Cut: 89 (+14)
- Prize fund: $500
- Winner's share: $500

Champion
- Louise Suggs
- def. Betty Jameson, 5&4
- Location within the United States Location within Oklahoma

The 1949 Women's Western Open was a golf competition held at the Oklahoma City Golf & Country Club in Nichols Hills, Oklahoma, a suburb of Oklahoma City, form June 20–25. It was the 20th edition of the Women's Western Open.

The field of 116 golfers played an 18-hole qualifying round to determine the 32 players advancing to match play. Grace Lenczyk won medalist honors with a qualifying round of 66 (−9). Match play was over 18 holes for each round except the 36-hole final. After the first round of match play, five professional and eleven amateur golfers remained in the field.

Louise Suggs won the championship in match play competition by defeating Betty Jameson in the final match, 5 and 4. Suggs earned the entire purse of $500.

== Final 16 bracket ==
Round of 16; June 22
Babe Zaharias	2&1
Grace Lenczyk (a)
Polly Riley (a)	2&1
Dorothy Kirby (a)
Betty Jameson	4&3
Patricia Devaney (a)
Carol Diringer (a)	1up
Margaret Gunther (a)
Marjorie Lindsay (a)	2&1
Jean Hopkins (a)
Louise Suggs	4&3
Betty MacKinnon (a)
Beverly Hanson (a)	1up
Bettye Mims White
Patty Berg	7&5
Claire Doran (a)

Quarterfinals; June 23
Babe Zaharias
Polly Riley (a)	3&1
Betty Jameson	4&2
Carol Diringer (a)
Marjorie Lindsay (a)
Louise Suggs	5&3
Beverly Hanson (a)
Patty Berg	3&2

Semifinals; June 24
Polly Riley (a)
Betty Jameson	2&1
Louise Suggs	1up
Patty Berg

Finals; June 25
Betty Jameson
Louise Suggs	5&4
