= New Orleans Women's Open =

Golf tournament formerly on the LPGA Tour

The New Orleans Women's Open was a golf tournament on the LPGA Tour from 1952 to 1954. It was played in New Orleans, Louisiana at City Park Golf Course in 1952 and 1953 and at the Colonial Golf and Country Club in 1954.

== Winners ==
- 1954 Marlene Bauer
- 1953 Patty Berg
- 1952 Patty Berg
