= Richmond Open (LPGA Tour) =

Golf tournament formerly on the LPGA Tour

The Richmond Open was a golf tournament on the LPGA Tour in 1951, 1952, and 1955. It was played at the Richmond Golf Club in Richmond, California.

== Winners ==
- 1955 Betty Jameson
- 1953-54 No tournament
- 1952 Patty Berg
- 1951 Babe Zaharias
