= Blackridge, Pennsylvania =

Community in Pennsylvania, U.S.

Coordinates: 40.44825°N 79.86374°W

Blackridge is a community in eastern Allegheny County and is a suburb of Pittsburgh, Pennsylvania, United States. This community consists of approximately 650 private homes built from 1920 to 1949. Blackridge Estates was and remains one of the area's largest residential communities.

Blackridge lies in the municipalities of Wilkinsburg, Penn Hills and Churchill. It maintains a Civic Association and a private park and swim club for residents.

Blackridge is defined as the territory bounded on the West by Graham Boulevard, on the South by William Penn Highway, on the East by Beulah Road and the Churchill Country Club property, from the Churchill Country Club property along Orlando Place to Atkinson Place, Atkinson Place to Pine Way, and Pine Way to Graham Boulevard, and includes the properties fronting on both sides of said portions of Country Club Drive, Orlando Place, Atkinson Place and Pine Way.

The Pittsburgh History and Landmarks Foundation Historic Landmark "1939 House" (Good Housekeeping house) is located in Blackridge at 2363 Sebring Place in the Wilkinsburg section of the neighborhood.

Preceded by Wilkinsburg	Bordering communities of Pittsburgh	Succeeded by Penn Hills
