= Triangle Round Robin =

Golf tournament

The Triangle Round Robin was a golf tournament on the LPGA Tour from 1953 to 1962. It was played at several different courses on the East Coast of the United States.

For its first nine years it was played using a "round robin" format, similar to the format used in the PGA Tour's Goodall Palm Beach Round Robin. The field was 16 players and they played in four foursomes over five rounds for a total of 90 holes. A player earned or lost points on each hole, in a match play style, based on her score versus her three opponents for that round. A player scored "+1" for each hole won and "−1" for each hole lost to each opponent. The groups were shuffled after every round so that every player played one round against every other player. The player with the most points after five rounds won. In 1962, the tournament shifted to a tradition 72-hole stroke play event.

The tournament sponsor was the Triangle Conduit and Cable company and its owner John E. McAuliffe.

== Winners ==
Year	Winner	Score	Venue	Location	Ref
J.E. McAuliffe Memorial
1962	Betsy Rawls	295 (+3)	Plainfield Country Club	Plainfield, New Jersey	
Triangle Round Robin
1961	Mary Lena Faulk	+35	Wykagyl Country Club	New Rochelle, New York	
1960	Louise Suggs	+59	Knollwood Country Club	Elmsford, New York	
1959	Betsy Rawls	+62	Canoe Brook Country Club	Summit, New Jersey	
1958	Louise Suggs	+51	Tedesco Country Club	Marblehead, Massachusetts	
1957	Fay Crocker	+51	Cavalier Yacht & Country Club	Virginia Beach, Virginia	
1956	Marlene Hagge	+50	Cavalier Yacht & Country Club	Virginia Beach, Virginia	
1955	Louise Suggs	+44	Grossinger Country Club	Liberty, New York	
1954	Patty Berg	+73	Cascades	Hot Springs, Virginia	
1953	Jackie Pung	+38	Shackamoxon Country Club	Scotch Plains, New Jersey	
