= 1949 U.S. Women's Open =

Golf Championship

Coordinates: 38.924°N 76.895°W

Tournament information
- Dates: September 22–25, 1949
- Location: Landover, Maryland
- Course: Prince George's Country Club
- Format: Stroke play – 72 holes

Statistics
- Par: 75
- Length: 6,892 yards (6,302 m)
- Winner's share: $1,500

Champion
- (United States) Louise Suggs
- 291 (−9)

Location in the United States

The 1949 U.S. Women's Open was the fourth U.S. Women's Open, held September 22–25 at Prince George's Country Club in Landover, Maryland, a suburb east of Washington, D.C.

Louise Suggs led wire-to-wire and won the first of her two U.S. Women's Open titles, fourteen strokes ahead of runner-up Babe Zaharias, the defending champion. It was the fourth of eleven major championships for Suggs.

The course no longer exists and is now the site of Kentland Community Center Park.

== Final leaderboard ==
Sunday, September 25, 1949

Place	Player	Score	To par	Money ($)
1	(United States) Louise Suggs	69-75-77-70=291	−9	1,500
2	(United States) Babe Zaharias	74-76-75-80=305	+5	1,000
3	(United States) Carol Diringer (a)	75-76-77-78=306	+6	0
T4	(United States) Patty Berg	73-84-78-75=310	+10	800
T4	(United States) Dot Kielty (a)	74-83-76-77=310	+10	0
T6	(United States) Marlene Bauer (a)	75-78-78-80=311	+11	0
T6	(United States) Beverly Hanson (a)	72-81-75-83=311	+11	0
T6	(United States) Mae-Murray Jones (a)	78-78-79-76=311	+11	0
T6	(England) Frances Stephens (a)	75-81-80-75=311	+11	0
10	(United States) Polly Riley (a)	75-83-79-75=312	+12	0
