= Jackie Pung =

American golfer (1921–2017)

Personal information
- Full name: Jacqueline Nolte Liwai Pung
- Nationality: United States
- Born: December 13, 1921 Honolulu, Hawaii
- Died: March 15, 2017 (aged 95) Kailua-Kona, Hawaii, U.S.

Career
- Sport: Golf
- Status: Professional
- Former tour: LPGA Tour
- Professional wins: 5

Number of wins by tour
- LPGA Tour: 5

Best results in LPGA major championships
- Titleholders C'ship: 5th: 1953
- Women's PGA C'ship: T3: 1958
- U.S. Women's Open: 2nd: 1953

Jacqueline Nolte Liwai Pung (December 13, 1921 – March 15, 2017) was an American professional golfer. She played on the LPGA Tour.

== Early life and amateur career ==
Pung was born in Honolulu, Hawaii. Her mother was Jacqueline Nolte. Her father was Jack Liwai, who was originally trained as a musician, but worked as a nurse for the grandson of shipping magnate Samuel Gardner Wilder. She won the Hawaiian Women's Amateur four times between 1937 and 1948. She won the 1952 U.S. Women's Amateur.

== Professional career ==
A self-taught golfer, Pung won five times on the LPGA Tour between 1953 and 1958.

Pung is best known for the tournament she did not win. In the 1957 U.S. Women's Open, she appeared to have beaten Betsy Rawls by one stroke when it was discovered that she had signed an incorrect scorecard and was disqualified. Both she and her playing partner, Betty Jameson, had recorded 5s on the fourth hole when in fact both had made 6s. Although both players had signed for the correct total score, they were both disqualified. The fans, officials, and members of Winged Foot Golf Club, where the tournament was held, took up a collection for Pung and presented her with over $3,000 (the winner's share was only $1,800).

== Personal life ==
In 1964, after her LPGA career, she moved to Hawaii's Big Island, where she gave golf lessons professionally. She eventually became the director of golf at Mauna Kea Beach Hotel.

She died March 15, 2017, at Life Care Center of Kona on Hawaii's Big Island, according to family members. She was 95.

== Awards and honors ==
Pung was inducted into the Hawaii Golf Hall of Fame in 1988.

== Amateur wins ==
- 1937 Hawaiian Women's Amateur
- 1938 Hawaiian Women's Amateur
- 1939 Hawaiian Women's Amateur
- 1948 Hawaiian Women's Amateur
- 1952 U.S. Women's Amateur

== Professional wins (5) ==
=== LPGA Tour wins (5) ===
- 1953 (2) Palm Springs Open, Triangle Round Robin
- 1955 (2) Sea Island Open, Jacksonville Open
- 1958 (1) Jackson Open
