= Sarasota Open (LPGA Tour) =

Golf tournament formerly on the LPGA Tour

The Sarasota Open was a golf tournament on the LPGA Tour from 1952 to 1956. It was played in Sarasota, Florida at the Sarasota Bay Country Club from 1952 to 1954 and at the Bobby Jones Golf Club from 1955 to 1956.

== Winners ==
- 1956 Betsy Rawls
- 1955 Betty Jameson
- 1954 Babe Zaharias
- 1953 Babe Zaharias
- 1952 Marlene Hagge
