= All American Open (LPGA Tour) =

Golf tournament formerly on the LPGA Tour

The All American Open was a golf tournament on the LPGA Tour from 1943 to 1957. It was played at the Tam O'Shanter Country Club in Niles, Illinois. It was played concurrently with the men's All American Open on the PGA Tour as well as All American Amateur events. Some of the pre-1950 events are considered official LPGA wins.

== Winners ==
- 1957 Patty Berg
- 1956 Louise Suggs
- 1955 Patty Berg
- 1954 Babe Zaharias
- 1953 Patty Berg
- 1952 Louise Suggs
- 1951 Babe Zaharias
- 1950 Babe Zaharias
- 1949 Louise Suggs
- 1948 Babe Zaharias
- 1947 Grace Lenczyk
- 1946 Babe Zaharias
- 1945 Patty Berg
- 1944 Betty Hicks
- 1943 Patty Berg
