= Eastern Women's Open =

Golf tournament formerly on the LPGA Tour

The Eastern Women's Open was a golf tournament on the LPGA Tour from 1949 to 1961. It was played at four different courses in New Jersey, Massachusetts and Pennsylvania.

== Tournament locations ==
Years	Venue	Location
1949	Essex Fells Country Club	Essex Fells, New Jersey
1950	Woodland Golf Club	Newton, Massachusetts
1951–55	Berkshire Country Club	Reading, Pennsylvania
1960–61	Range End Country Club	Dillsburg, Pennsylvania

== Winners ==
Eastern Open

- 1961 Mary Lena Faulk
- 1960 Mickey Wright
- 1956-59 No tournament
- 1955 Louise Suggs
- 1954 No tournament
- 1953 Betsy Rawls
- 1952 Betsy Rawls
- 1951 Beverly Hanson
- 1950 Patty Berg
- 1949 Babe Zaharias
