= Louise Suggs =

American professional golfer (1923–2015)

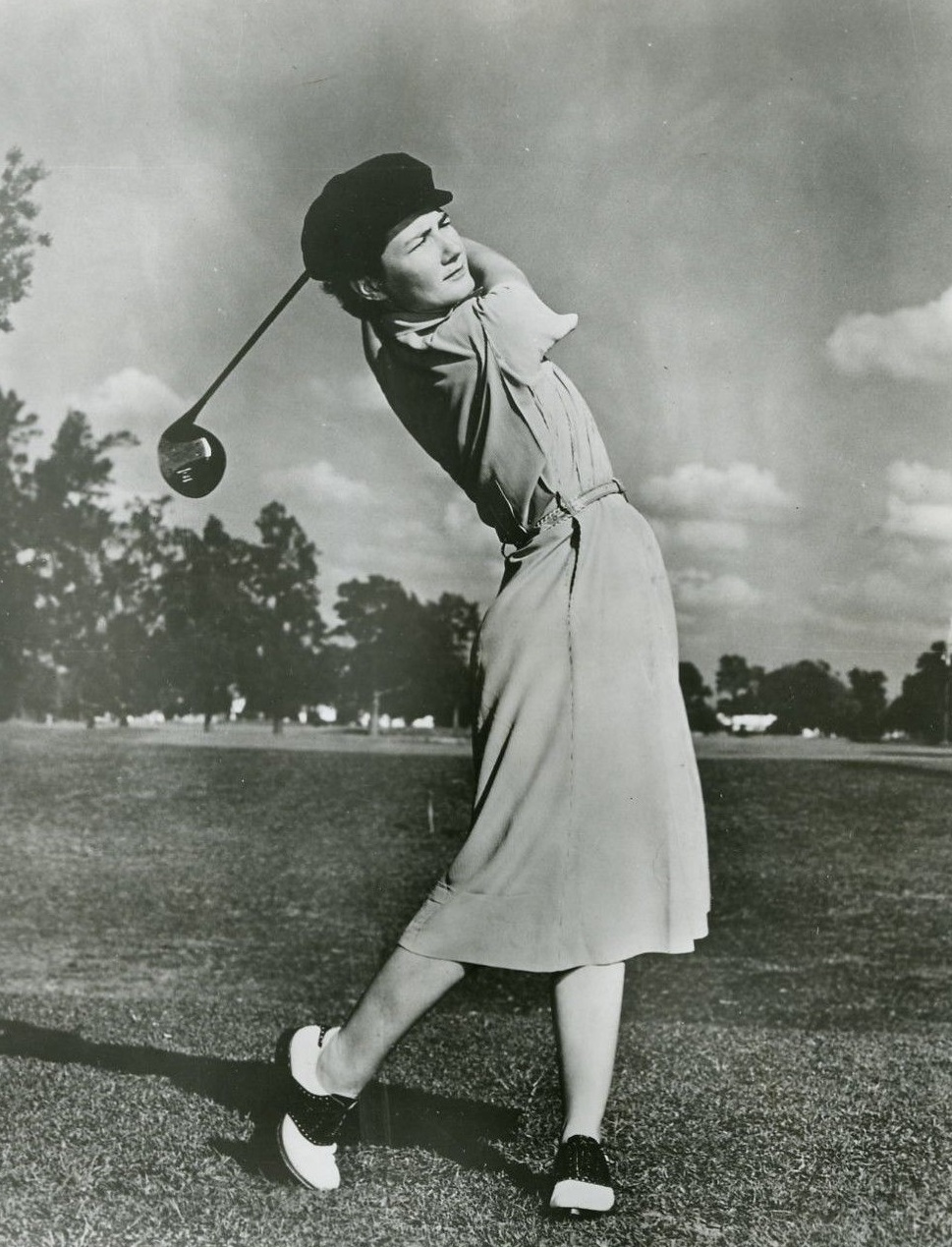
- Suggs in 1958

Personal information
- Full name: Mae Louise Suggs
- Nationality: United States
- Born: September 7, 1923 Atlanta, Georgia, U.S.
- Died: August 7, 2015 (aged 91) Sarasota, Florida, U.S.
- Height: 5 ft 6 in (1.68 m)

Career
- Sport: Golf
- Turned professional: 1948
- Former tour: LPGA Tour (co-founder)
- Professional wins: 61

Number of wins by tour
- LPGA Tour: 61 (4th all time)

Best results in LPGA major championships (wins: 11)
- Western Open: Won: 1946, 1947, 1949, 1953
- Titleholders C'ship: Won: 1946, 1954, 1956, 1959
- Chevron Championship: CUT: 1983
- Women's PGA C'ship: Won: 1957
- U.S. Women's Open: Won: 1949, 1952

Achievements and awards
- World Golf Hall of Fame: 1951 (member page)
- LPGA Tour Money Winner: 1953, 1960
- LPGA Vare Trophy: 1957
- Patty Berg Award: 2000
- Bob Jones Award: 2007

Mae Louise Suggs (September 7, 1923 – August 7, 2015) was an American professional golfer, as well as one of the founders of the LPGA Tour and thus modern ladies' golf.

== Amateur career ==
Born in Atlanta, Suggs had a very successful amateur career, beginning as a teenager. She won the Georgia State Amateur in 1940 at age 16 and again in 1942, was the Southern Amateur Champion in 1941 and 1947, and won the North and South Women's Amateur three times (1942, 1946, 1948). She won the 1946 and 1947 Women's Western Amateur,

She also won a number of professional tournaments during this era. These include the 1946 and 1947 Women's Western Open, which was designated as a major championship when the LPGA was founded. She also won the 1946 Titleholders Championship which was also subsequently designated as a women's major.

She won the 1947 U.S. Women's Amateur and the next year won the British Ladies Amateur. She finished her amateur career representing the United States on the 1948 Curtis Cup Team.

== Professional career ==
In 1948, she turned professional. She went on to win 58 additional professional tournaments, with a total of 11 majors. Her prowess on the golf course is reflected in the fact that from 1950 to 1960 she was only once out of the top 3 in the season-ending money list. Suggs' victory in the 1957 LPGA Championship made her the first LPGA player to complete a career Grand Slam.

She was one of the co-founders of the LPGA in 1950, which included her two great rivals of the time, Patty Berg and Babe Zaharias. Suggs served as the organization's president from 1955 to 1957.

== Personal life ==
Suggs never married; she often said, "All the women golfers are my children." She was a member of Cherokee Town and Country Club, located north of Atlanta.

== Awards and honors ==
- In 1966, she was inducted into the Georgia Sports Hall of Fame.
- In 1967, Suggs was an inaugural inductee into the LPGA Tour Hall of Fame.
- In 1979, she was inducted into the World Golf Hall of Fame.
- The Louise Suggs Rolex Rookie of the Year Award, given annually to the most accomplished first-year player on the LPGA Tour, is named in her honor.
- In 2006 Suggs was named the 2007 recipient of the Bob Jones Award, given by the United States Golf Association in recognition of distinguished sportsmanship in golf.
- In February 2015, she became one of the first female members of the Royal and Ancient Golf Club of St Andrews.

== Amateur wins ==
- 1940 Georgia Women's Amateur, Southern Women's Amateur
- 1942 Georgia Women's Amateur, North and South Women's Amateur
- 1946 North and South Women's Amateur, Women's Western Amateur
- 1947 Southern Women's Amateur, Women's Western Amateur, U.S. Women's Amateur
- 1948 North and South Women's Amateur, British Ladies Amateur

== Professional wins (61) ==
=== LPGA Tour wins (61) ===
- 1946 (3) **Titleholders Championship**, **Women's Western Open** (as an amateur), Pro-Lady Victory National Championship (as an amateur, with Ben Hogan)
- 1947 (1) **Women's Western Open** (as an amateur)
- 1948 (1) Belleair Open
- 1949 (4) **U.S. Women's Open**, **Women's Western Open**, All American Open, Muskegon Invitational
- 1950 (2) Chicago Weathervane, New York Weathervane
- 1951 (1) Carrollton Georgia Open
- 1952 (6) Jacksonville Open, Tampa Open, Stockton Open, **U.S. Women's Open**, All American Open, Betty Jameson Open
- 1953 (9) Tampa Open, Betsy Rawls Open, Phoenix Weathervane (tied with Patty Berg), San Diego Open, Bakersfield Open, San Francisco Weathervane, Philadelphia Weathervane, 144 Hole Weathervane, **Women's Western Open**
- 1954 (5) Sea Island Open, **Titleholders Championship**, Betsy Rawls Open, Carrollton Georgia Open, Babe Zaharias Open
- 1955 (5) Los Angeles Open, Oklahoma City Open, Eastern Open, Triangle Round Robin, St. Louis Open
- 1956 (3) Havana Open, **Titleholders Championship**, All American Open
- 1957 (2) **LPGA Championship**, Heart of America Invitational
- 1958 (4) Babe Zaharias Open, Gatlinburg Open, Triangle Round Robin, French Lick Open
- 1959 (3) St. Petersburg Open, **Titleholders Championship**, Dallas Civitan Open
- 1960 (4) Dallas Civitan Open, Triangle Round Robin, Youngstown Kitchens Trumbull Open, San Antonio Civitan
- 1961 (7) Naples Pro-Am, Royal Poinciana Invitational, Golden Circle of Golf Festival, Dallas Civitan Open, Kansas City Open, San Antonio Civitan, Sea Island Open
- 1962 (1) St. Petersburg Open

LPGA majors are shown in bold.

== Major championships ==
=== Wins (11) ===
Year	Championship	Winning score	Margin	Runner(s)-up
1946	Titleholders Championship	+14 (80-77-77-80=314)	2 strokes	(United States) Eileen Stulb
1946	Women's Western Open	2 up		(United States) Patty Berg
1947	Women's Western Open	4 & 2		(United States) Dorothy Kirby (a)
1949	U.S. Women's Open	−9 (69-75-77-70=291)	14 strokes	(United States) Babe Zaharias
1949	Women's Western Open	5 & 4		(United States) Betty Jameson
1952	U.S. Women's Open	+8 (70-69-70-75=284)	7 strokes	(United States) Marlene Hagge, (United States) Betty Jameson
1953	Women's Western Open	6 & 5		(United States) Patty Berg
1954	Titleholders Championship	+5 (73-71-76-73=293)	7 strokes	(United States) Patty Berg
1956	Titleholders Championship	+14 (78-75-75-74=302)	1 stroke	(United States) Patty Berg
1957	LPGA Championship	+5 (69-74-74-68=285)	3 strokes	(United States) Wiffi Smith
1959	Titleholders Championship	+9 (78-73-75-71=297)	1 stroke	(United States) Betsy Rawls

(a)=Amateur

== Team appearances ==
Amateur

- Curtis Cup (representing the United States): 1948 (winners)

== See also ==
- Women's Career Grand Slam Champion
- List of golfers with most LPGA Tour wins
- List of golfers with most LPGA major championship wins
