= 1964 LPGA Tour =

Golf tour season

1964 LPGA Tour season
- Duration: March 19, 1964 – November 22, 1964
- Number of official events: 32
- Most wins: 11 (United States) Mickey Wright
- Money leader: (United States) Mickey Wright
- Vare Trophy: (United States) Mickey Wright
- Rookie of the Year: (United States) Susie Maxwell

The 1964 LPGA Tour was the 15th season since the LPGA Tour officially began in 1950. The season ran from March 19 to November 22. The season consisted of 32 official money events. Mickey Wright won the most tournaments, 11. She also led the money list with earnings of $29,800.

There were two first-time winners in 1964: Clifford Ann Creed and Carol Mann.

The tournament results and award winners are listed below.

== Tournament results ==
The following table shows all the official money events for the 1964 season. "Date" is the ending date of the tournament. The numbers in parentheses after the winners' names are the number of wins they had on the tour up to and including that event. Majors are shown in bold.

Date	Tournament	Location	Winner	Score	Purse ($)	1st prize ($)
Mar 22	**Women's Western Open**	Florida	(United States) **Carol Mann (1)**	308	7,500	1,200
Apr 5	St. Petersburg Women's Open Invitational	Florida	(United States) Mary Lena Faulk (10)	289	10,000	1,500
Apr 12	Baton Rouge Ladies' Open Invitational	Louisiana	(United States) Sandra Haynie (4)	211	7,500	1,200
Apr 19	Peach Blossom Invitational	South Carolina	(United States) Mickey Wright (53)	215	7,500	1,200
Apr 26	**Titleholders Championship**	Georgia	(United States) **Marilynn Smith (12)**	289	7,500	1,300
May 3	Clifford Ann Creed Invitational	Louisiana	(United States) Mickey Wright (54)	214	8,000	1,250
May 10	Squirt Ladies' Open Invitational	Missouri	(United States) Mickey Wright (55)	215	12,500	2,000
May 17	Muskogee Civitan Open	Oklahoma	(United States) Mickey Wright (56)	213	8,000	1,250
May 24	Dallas Civitan Open Invitational	Texas	(United States) Betsy Rawls (47)	282	13,500	2,100
May 31	Babe Zaharias Open Invitational	Texas	(United States) Ruth Jessen (6)	214	8,500	1,300
Jun 14	Lady Carling Open	Maryland	(United States) Clifford Ann Creed (1)	217	10,000	1,500
Jun 21	Lady Carling Eastern Open	Massachusetts	(United States) Mickey Wright (57)	220	10,000	1,500
Jun 28	Waldemar Open	New York	(United States) Mickey Wright (58)	215	9,200	1,350
Jul 11	**U.S. Women's Open**	California	(United States) **Mickey Wright (59)**	290	9,900	2,200
Jul 19	Yankee Women's Open	Michigan	(United States) Ruth Jessen (7)	213	10,000	1,500
Jul 26	Cosmopolitan Women's Open	Illinois	(United States) Clifford Ann Creed (2)	211	8,500	1,300
Aug 2	Milwaukee Jaycee Open	Wisconsin	(United States) Mickey Wright (60)	289	12,500	2,000
Aug 9	Waterloo Women's Open Invitational	Iowa	(United States) Shirley Englehorn (4)	211	8,500	1,300
Aug 16	Omaha Jaycee Open Invitational	Nebraska	(United States) Ruth Jessen (8)	200	9,000	1,350
Aug 23	Albuquerque Pro-Am	New Mexico	(United States) Marilynn Smith (13)	216	9,000	1,350
Aug 30	Riverside Ladies Open	Utah	(United States) Clifford Ann Creed (3)	286	9,000	1,350
Sep 7	Valhalla Open	Washington	(United States) Betsy Rawls (48)	290	10,000	1,500
Sep 13	Eugene Ladies' Open	Oregon	(United States) Mary Mills (2)	289	9,000	1,350
Sep 27	Visalia Ladies' Open	California	(United States) Mickey Wright (61)	284	9,000	1,350
Oct 4	**LPGA Championship**	Nevada	(United States) **Mary Mills (3)**	278	16,500	2,450
Oct 11	Hillside House Ladies' Open	California	(United States) Ruth Jessen (9)	209	8,500	1,300
Oct 18	Mickey Wright Invitational	California	(United States) Marlene Hagge (19)	287	8,500	1,300
Oct 25	Phoenix Thunderbirds Ladies' Open	Arizona	(United States) Ruth Jessen (10)	289	9,000	1,350
Nov 1	Las Cruces Ladies' Open	New Mexico	(United States) Sandra Haynie (5)	208	8,500	1,300
Nov 8	Tall City Open	Texas	(United States) Mickey Wright (62)	207	9,000	1,350
Nov 15	San Antonio Civitan Open	Texas	(United States) Kathy Whitworth (11)	283	10,000	1,500
Nov 22	Mary Mills Mississippi Gulf Coast Invitational	Mississippi	(United States) Mickey Wright (63)	215	17,000	2,550

== Awards ==
Award	Winner	Country
Money winner	Mickey Wright (4)	United States
Scoring leader (Vare Trophy)	Mickey Wright (5)	United States
Rookie of the Year	Susie Maxwell	United States
