= 1963 LPGA Tour =

Golf tour season

1963 LPGA Tour season
- Duration: February 1, 1963 – November 17, 1963
- Number of official events: 32
- Most wins: 13 (United States) Mickey Wright
- Money leader: (United States) Mickey Wright
- Vare Trophy: (United States) Mickey Wright
- Rookie of the Year: (United States) Clifford Ann Creed

The 1963 LPGA Tour was the 14th season since the LPGA Tour officially began in 1950. The season ran from February 1 to November 17. The season consisted of 32 official money events. Mickey Wright won the most tournaments, 13. She also led the money list with earnings of $31,269.

There were two first-time winners in 1963: Mary Mills and Barbara Romack.

The tournament results and award winners are listed below.

== Tournament results ==
The following table shows all the official money events for the 1963 season. "Date" is the ending date of the tournament. The numbers in parentheses after the winners' names are the number of wins they had on the tour up to and including that event. Majors are shown in bold.

Date	Tournament	Location	Winner	Score	Purse ($)	1st prize ($)
Feb 3	Sea Island Women's Invitational	Georgia	(United States) Mickey Wright (40)	212	6,000	1,000
Feb 10	St. Petersburg Women's Open	Florida	(United States) Mickey Wright (41)	288	15,500	2,325
Apr 21	Sunshine Women's Open	Florida	(United States) Betsy Rawls (46)	220	7,500	1,200
Apr 28	**Titleholders Championship**	Georgia	(United States) **Marilynn Smith (8)**	292	7,500	1,235
May 5	Peach Blossom Open	South Carolina	(United States) Marilynn Smith (9)	216	7,500	1,200
May 12	Alpine Civitan Open	Louisiana	(United States) Mickey Wright (42)	219	7,500	1,200
May 19	Muskogee Civitan Open	Oklahoma	(United States) Mickey Wright (43)	285	8,000	1,250
May 26	Dallas Civitan Open	Texas	(United States) Mickey Wright (44)	283	13,000	2,000
Jun 2	Babe Zaharias Open	Texas	(United States) Mickey Wright (45)	209	8,000	1,250
Jun 9	Rock City Ladies Open	Tennessee	(United States) Barbara Romack (1)	212	10,000	1,500
Jun 16	Cosmopolitan Women's Open	Illinois	(United States) Ruth Jessen (5)	213	7,500	1,200
Jun 23	**Women's Western Open**	Wisconsin	(United States) **Mickey Wright (46)**	292	7,500	1,200
Jun 30	Carvel Ladies Open	New York	(United States) Kathy Whitworth (3)	217	9,000	1,350
Jul 7	Lady Carling Eastern Open	Massachusetts	(United States) Shirley Englehorn (3)	221	10,000	1,500
Jul 14	Sight Open	Maryland	(United States) Marlene Hagge (18)	208	10,000	1,500
Jul 20	**U.S. Women's Open**	Ohio	(United States) **Mary Mills (1)**	289	9,000	2,000
Jul 28	Wolverine Open	Michigan	(United States) Kathy Whitworth (4)	198	8,000	1,250
Aug 4	Milwaukee Jaycee Open	Wisconsin	(United States) Kathy Whitworth (5)	286	12,000	2,000
Aug 11	Waterloo Women's Open Invitational	Iowa	(United States) Mickey Wright (47)	208	7,500	1,200
Aug 18	Albuquerque Swing Parade	New Mexico	(United States) Mickey Wright (48)	211	10,000	1,350
Aug 25	Ogden Ladies' Open	Utah	(United States) Kathy Whitworth (6)	214	8,500	1,300
Sep 2	Idaho Centennial Ladies' Open	Idaho	(United States) Mickey Wright (49)	210	7,500	1,200
Sep 8	Spokane Women's Open	Washington	(United States) Kathy Whitworth (7)	210	9,000	1,250
Sep 15	Eugene Ladies' Open	Oregon	(United States) Marilynn Smith (10)	295	10,000	1,350
Sep 22	Visalia Ladies' Open	California	(United States) Mickey Wright (50)	285	10,000	1,350
Sep 29	Mickey Wright Invitational	California	(United States) Mickey Wright (51)	222	9,000	1,300
Oct 13	**LPGA Championship**	Nevada	(United States) **Mickey Wright (52)**	294	16,500	2,450
Oct 20	Hillside Open	California	(United States) Kathy Whitworth (8)	219	7,500	1,200
Oct 27	Phoenix Thunderbirds Ladies Open	Arizona	(United States) Sandra Haynie (3)	286	10,000	1,350
Nov 3	Cavern City Open	New Mexico	(United States) Marilynn Smith (11)	212	7,500	1,200
Nov 10	San Antonio Civitan Open	Texas	(United States) Kathy Whitworth (9)	299	8,500	1,300
Nov 17	Mary Mills Mississippi Gulf Coast Invitational	Mississippi	(United States) Kathy Whitworth (10)	219	15,600	2,325

== Awards ==
Award	Winner	Country
Money winner	Mickey Wright (3)	United States
Scoring leader (Vare Trophy)	Mickey Wright (4)	United States
Rookie of the Year	Clifford Ann Creed	United States
