= 1962 LPGA Tour =

Golf tour season

1962 LPGA Tour season
- Duration: January 19, 1962 – November 4, 1962
- Number of official events: 29
- Most wins: 10 (United States) Mickey Wright
- Money leader: (United States) Mickey Wright
- Vare Trophy: (United States) Mickey Wright
- Rookie of the Year: (United States) Mary Mills

The 1962 LPGA Tour was the 13th season since the LPGA Tour officially began in 1950. The season ran from January 19 to November 4. The season consisted of 29 official money events. Mickey Wright won the most tournaments, 10. She also led the money list with earnings of $21,641. The first Rookie of the Year was won by Mary Mills.

There were four first-time winners in 1962: Shirley Englehorn, Sandra Haynie, who would win 42 LPGA events, Murle Lindstrom, and Kathy Whitworth, who would win a record 88 LPGA events. The season saw the last wins of Louise Suggs (58 career wins) and Patty Berg (60). It also saw the first and only official win by a man, Sam Snead in the Royal Poinciana Plaza Invitational.

The tournament results and award winners are listed below.

== Tournament results ==
The following table shows all the official money events for the 1962 season. "Date" is the ending date of the tournament. The numbers in parentheses after the winners' names are the number of wins they had on the tour up to and including that event. Majors are shown in bold.

Date	Tournament	Location	Winner	Score	Purse ($)	1st prize ($)
Jan 21	Sea Island Women's Invitational	Georgia	(United States) Mickey Wright (30)	226	6,000	1,000
Feb 7	Royal Poinciana Plaza Invitational	Florida	(United States) Sam Snead (1)	211	4,500	2,000
Feb 18	St. Petersburg Open	Florida	(United States) Louise Suggs (56)	280	7,500	1,200
Apr 22	Sunshine Open	Florida	(United States) Marilynn Smith (6)	214	7,000	1,200
Apr 29	**Titleholders Championship**	Georgia	(United States) **Mickey Wright (31)**	295	7,500	1,330
May 6	Peach Blossom Open	South Carolina	(United States) Mary Lena Faulk (8)	217	7,500	1,100
May 13	**Women's Western Open**	Alabama	(United States) **Mickey Wright (32)**	295	7,000	1,200
May 20	Muskogee Civitan Open	Oklahoma	(United States) Patty Berg (51)	290	7,000	1,200
May 27	Dallas Civitan Open	Texas	(United States) Ruth Jessen (3)	292	9,300	1,500
Jun 10	Austin Civitan Open	Texas	(United States) Sandra Haynie (1)	289	7,000	1,200
Jun 17	Cosmopolitan Open	Illinois	(United States) Sandra Haynie (2)	210	7,500	1,200
Jun 24	J.E. McAuliffe Memorial	New Jersey	(United States) Betsy Rawls (45)	295 (+3)	8,000	1,250
Jun 30	**U.S. Women's Open**	South Carolina	(United States) **Murle Lindstrom (1)**	301	8,000	1,800
Jul 8	Kelly Girls Open	Maryland	(United States) Kathy Whitworth (1)	215	7,500	1,300
Jul 15	Milwaukee Open	Wisconsin	(United States) Mickey Wright (33)	289	10,000	1,350
Jul 22	Lady Carling Open	Massachusetts	(United States) Shirley Englehorn (1)	226	10,000	1,450
Aug 5	Waterloo Open	Iowa	(United States) Marilynn Smith (7)	279	7,500	1,200
Aug 12	Heart of America Invitational	Kansas	(United States) Mickey Wright (34)	286	7,500	1,000
Aug 19	Albuquerque Swing Parade	New Mexico	(United States) Mickey Wright (35)	219	7,500	1,000
Aug 26	Salt Lake City Open	Utah	(United States) Mickey Wright (36)	292	7,000	1,200
Sep 3	Spokane Open	Washington	(United States) Mickey Wright (37)	275	7,000	1,200
Sep 9	Eugene Open	Oregon	(United States) Shirley Englehorn (2)	292	7,500	1,250
Sep 16	Sacramento Open	California	(United States) Ruth Jessen (4)	218	7,500	1,300
Sep 23	Visalia Open	California	(United States) Mary Lena Faulk (9)	289	7,500	1,350
Sep 30	Mickey Wright Invitational	California	(United States) Mickey Wright (38)	286	5,000	1,300
Oct 7	**LPGA Championship**	Nevada	(United States) **Judy Kimball (2)**	282	15,000	2,300
Oct 14	Phoenix Thunderbird Open	Arizona	(United States) Kathy Whitworth (2)	213	8,400	1,350
Oct 21	Carlsbad Cavern Open	New Mexico	(United States) Mickey Wright (39)	219	7,000	1,200
Nov 4	San Antonio Civitan	Texas	(United States) Murle Lindstrom (2)	215	7,000	1,200

== Awards ==
Award	Winner	Country
Money winner	Mickey Wright (2)	United States
Scoring leader (Vare Trophy)	Mickey Wright (3)	United States
Rookie of the Year	Mary Mills	United States
