= 1965 LPGA Tour =

Golf tour season

1965 LPGA Tour season
- Duration: March 18, 1965 – November 28, 1965
- Number of official events: 30
- Most wins: 8 (United States) Kathy Whitworth
- Money leader: (United States) Kathy Whitworth
- Vare Trophy: (United States) Kathy Whitworth
- Rookie of the Year: (United States) Margie Masters

The 1965 LPGA Tour was the 16th season since the LPGA Tour officially began in 1950. The season ran from March 18 to November 28. The season consisted of 30 official money events. Kathy Whitworth won the most tournaments, eight. She also led the money list with earnings of $28,658.

There were two first-time winners in 1965: Susie Maxwell and Jo Ann Prentice.

The tournament results and award winners are listed below.

== Tournament results ==
The following table shows all the official money events for the 1965 season. "Date" is the ending date of the tournament. The numbers in parentheses after the winners' names are the number of wins they had on the tour up to and including that event. Majors are shown in bold.

Date	Tournament	Location	Winner	Score	Purse ($)	1st prize ($)
Mar 21	St. Petersburg Open	Florida	(United States) Kathy Whitworth (12)	281	9,600	1,500
Mar 28	All State Ladies' Invitational	Mississippi	(United States) Jo Ann Prentice (1)	146^	8,000	1,275
Apr 4	Baton Rouge Invitational	Louisiana	(United States) Mickey Wright (64)	214	8,000	1,275
Apr 25	Pensacola Invitational	Florida	(United States) Betsy Rawls (49)	218	8,000	1,275
May 2	Shreveport Kiwanis Invitational	Louisiana	(United States) Kathy Whitworth (13)	210	8,000	1,275
May 2	Peach Blossom Open	South Carolina	(United States) Marilynn Smith (14)	213	8,000	1,275
May 16	Muskogee Civitan Open	Oklahoma	(United States) Susie Maxwell (1)	213	8,000	1,275
May 23	Dallas Civitan Open	Texas	(United States) Mickey Wright (65)	283	14,000	2,100
May 30	Babe Zaharias Open	Texas	(United States) Marlene Hagge (20)	215	8,000	1,275
Jun 6	Blue Grass Invitational	Kentucky	(United States) Kathy Whitworth (14)	213	8,500	1,350
Jun 13	**Women's Western Open**	Illinois	(United States) **Susie Maxwell (2)**	290	9,600	1,500
Jun 20	Cosmopolitan Open	Illinois	(United States) Sandra Haynie (6)	210	8,000	1,275
Jun 27	Lady Carling Open	Maryland	(United States) Carol Mann (2)	211	10,000	1,500
Jul 3	**U.S. Women's Open**	New Jersey	(United States) **Carol Mann (3)**	290	17,780	4,000
Jul 11	Lady Carling Midwest Open	Ohio	(United States) Kathy Whitworth (15)	219	10,000	1,500
Jul 18	Yankee Open	Michigan	(United States) Kathy Whitworth (16)	213	15,000	2,250
Jul 25	Buckeye Savings Invitational	Ohio	(United States) Kathy Whitworth (17)	207	10,000	1,500
Aug 1	Waterloo Open	Iowa	(United States) Betsy Rawls (50)	214	8,000	1,275
Aug 8	Milwaukee Open	Wisconsin	(United States) Marlene Hagge (21)	287	12,000	1,875
Aug 15	St. Louis Open	Missouri	(United States) Mary Mills (4)	216	12,500	1,875
Aug 22	Omaha Jaycee Open	Nebraska	(United States) Clifford Ann Creed (4)	208	11,500	1,500
Sep 12	Eugene Open	Oregon	(United States) Mary Mills (5)	294	10,000	1,350
Sep 19	Visalia Open	California	(United States) Clifford Ann Creed (5)	289	8,500	1,350
Sep 26	**LPGA Championship**	Nevada	(United States) **Sandra Haynie (7)**	279	15,830	2,475
Oct 3	Mickey Wright Invitational	California	(United States) Kathy Whitworth (18)	283	8,600	1,350
Oct 24	Phoenix Thunderbirds Open	Arizona	(United States) Marlene Hagge (22)	290	8,600	1,350
Oct 30	Las Cruces Open	New Mexico	(United States) Clifford Ann Creed (6)	215	9,000	1,350
Nov 7	LPGA Tall City Open	Texas	(United States) Marlene Hagge (23)	206	10,000	1,350
Nov 14	Alamo Open	Texas	(United States) Marlene Hagge (24)	216	8,800	1,500
Nov 28	**Titleholders Championship**	Georgia	(United States) **Kathy Whitworth (19)**	287	10,000	1,500

^ - weather-shortened tournament

== Awards ==
Award	Winner	Country
Money winner	Kathy Whitworth	United States
Scoring leader (Vare Trophy)	Kathy Whitworth	United States
Rookie of the Year	Margie Masters	United States
