= 1961 LPGA Tour =

Golf tour season

1961 LPGA Tour season
- Duration: February 9, 1961 – October 22, 1961
- Number of official events: 24
- Most wins: 10 (United States) Mickey Wright
- Money leader: (United States) Mickey Wright
- Vare Trophy: (United States) Mickey Wright

The 1961 LPGA Tour was the 12th season since the LPGA Tour officially began in 1950. The season ran from February 9 to October 22. The season consisted of 24 official money events. Mickey Wright won the most tournaments, 10. She also led the money list with earnings of $22,236.

There was only one first-time winner in 1961, Judy Kimball.

The tournament results and award winners are listed below.

== Tournament results ==
The following table shows all the official money events for the 1961 season. "Date" is the ending date of the tournament. The numbers in parentheses after the winners' names are the number of wins they had on the tour up to and including that event. Majors are shown in bold.

| Date | Tournament | Location | Winner | Score | Purse ($) | 1st prize ($) |
|---|---|---|---|---|---|---|
| Feb 12 | St. Petersburg Open | Florida | (United States) Mickey Wright (20) | 279 | 7,500 | 1,247 |
| Feb 14 | Royal Poinciana Invitational | Florida | (United States) Louise Suggs (51) | 156 | 4,000 | 1,200 |
| Mar 12 | Miami Open | Florida | (United States) Mickey Wright (21) | 220 | 7,500 | 1,247 |
| Mar 26 | Golden Circle of Golf Festival | Florida | (United States) Louise Suggs (52) | 293 | 7,500 | 1,247 |
| Apr 16 | Dallas Civitan Open | Texas | (United States) Louise Suggs (53) | 291 | 9,500 | 1,662 |
| Apr 23 | Babe Zaharias Open | Texas | (United States) Mary Lena Faulk (4) | 211 | 7,000 | 1,200 |
| Apr 30 | **Titleholders Championship** | Georgia | (United States) **Mickey Wright (22)** | 299 | 7,000 | 1,200 |
| May 7 | Peach Blossom Open | South Carolina | (United States) Ruth Jessen (2) | 212 | 7,000 | 1,083 |
| May 14 | Columbus Open | Georgia | (United States) Mickey Wright (23) | 292 | 5,700 | 998 |
| Jun 4 | **Women's Western Open** | Tennessee | (United States) **Mary Lena Faulk (5)** | 290 | 7,500 | 1,313 |
| Jun 11 | Triangle Round Robin | New York | (United States) Mary Lena Faulk (6) | +35 | 8,000 | 1,100 |
| Jun 18 | Eastern Open | Pennsylvania | (United States) Mary Lena Faulk (7) | 214 | 7,500 | 1,247 |
| Jul 1 | **U.S. Women's Open** | New Jersey | (United States) **Mickey Wright (24)** | 293 | 8,000 | 1,800 |
| Jul 16 | Tippecanoe Open | Indiana | (United States) Kathy Cornelius (4) | 204 | 5,700 | 997 |
| Jul 23 | Cosmopolitan Open | Illinois | (United States) Betsy Rawls (43) | 213 | 7,500 | 1,247 |
| Jul 30 | American Women's Open | Minnesota | (United States) Judy Kimball (1) | 295 | 7,500 | 1,247 |
| Aug 6 | Waterloo Open | Iowa | (United States) Mickey Wright (25) | 286 | 7,500 | 1,247 |
| Aug 13 | Kansas City Open | Kansas | (United States) Louise Suggs (54) | 295 | 7,500 | 1,247 |
| Aug 27 | Spokane Women's Open | Washington | (United States) Mickey Wright (26) | 280 | 7,500 | 1,247 |
| Sep 24 | Sacramento Valley Open | California | (United States) Mickey Wright (27) | 223 | 8,000 | 1,450 |
| Oct 1 | Mickey Wright Invitational | California | (United States) Mickey Wright (28) | 290 | 8,000 | 1,450 |
| Oct 8 | Bill Brannin's Swing Parade | New Mexico | (United States) Betsy Rawls (44) | 221 | 7,500 | 1,247 |
| Oct 15 | **LPGA Championship** | Nevada | (United States) **Mickey Wright (29)** | 287 | 15,000 | 2,500 |
| Oct 22 | San Antonio Civitan | Texas | (United States) Louise Suggs (55) | 212 | 7,500 | 1,247 |

== Awards ==
| Award | Winner | Country |
|---|---|---|
| Money winner | Mickey Wright | United States |
| Scoring leader (Vare Trophy) | Mickey Wright (2) | United States |
