= List of Women's Western Open champions =

The Women's Western Open was an annual golf competition, which was played in match play between 1930 and 1954, and strokeplay between 1955 and 1967. It was established in 1930 and was a women's major championship that was organized by the Women's Western Golf Association. This event has the distinction of being the first women's major championship ever played.

Patty Berg holds the record for the most victories with seven, which is the overall record of the combined eras of match and stroke play. During match play competition Berg, Louise Suggs, and Babe Zaharias holds the record for most victories with four. In the stroke play era, Berg and Mickey Wright holds the record for most victories with three. The most consecutive in the combined eras is two and was done by the following golfers: Berg, Suggs, Zaharias, Opal Hill and Wright. Berg and Betsy Rawls are the only two golfers to win the competition in match play and stroke play eras. In the match play era, 9&8 was the largest margin of victory by Marian McDougall in 1934, Hill in 1935, and Betty Jameson in 1942. During the stroke play era, Kathy Whitworth holds the record for lowest under-par at 11 in 1967 and the aggregate low of 289,

== Key ==
†	Tournament won in a playoff
*	Tournament won by an amateur, or had a runner-up who is an amateur

== Champions ==
Note: All winners (and runners-up from the match play era) were from the United States.

=== Match play era ===
Year	Champion	Margin	Runner-up	Course	Location	Notes
1930	Lucia Mida*	6 & 5	June Beebe*	Acacia CC	Indian Head Park, Illinois	
1931	June Beebe*	3 & 2	Mrs. Melvin Jones*	Midlothian CC	Midlothian, Illinois	
1932	Jane Weiller*	5 & 4	June Beebe*	Ozaukee CC	Milwaukee, Wisconsin	
1933	June Beebe*	3 & 2	Jane Weiller*	Olympia Fields CC	Olympia Fields, Illinois	
1934	Marian McDougall*	9 & 7	Mrs. Guy Riegel*	Portland G&CC	Portland, Oregon	
1935	Opal Hill*	9 & 7	Mrs. S.L. Reinhart*	Sunset Ridge CC	Chicago, Illinois	
1936	Opal Hill*	3 & 2	Mrs. Charles Dennehy*	Topeka CC	Topeka, Kansas	
1937	Helen Hicks	6 & 5	Bea Barrett*	Beverly CC	Chicago, Illinois	
1938	Bea Barrett*	6 & 4	Helen Hofmann	Broadmoor GC	Colorado Springs, Colorado	
1939	Helen Dettweiler*	4 & 3	Bea Barrett*	Westwood CC	St. Louis, Missouri	
1940	Babe Zaharias*	5 & 4	Mrs. Russell Mann	Blue Mound G&CC	Wauwatosa, Wisconsin	
1941	Patty Berg	7 & 6	Olga Strashun Weil	Cincinnati CC	Cincinnati, Ohio	
1942	Betty Jameson*	9 & 7	Phyllis Otto	Elmhurst CC	Chicago, Illinois	
1943	Patty Berg	1 up	Dorothy Kirby*	Glen Oak CC	Glen Ellyn, Illinois	
1944	Babe Zaharias*	7 & 5	Dorothy Germain*	Park Ridge	Chicago, Illinois	
1945	Babe Zaharias*	4 & 2	Dorothy Germain*	Highland G&CC	Indianapolis, Indiana	
1946	Louise Suggs*	2 up	Patty Berg	Wakoda Club	Des Moines, Iowa	
1947	Louise Suggs*	4 & 2	Dorothy Kirby*	Capital City Club	Atlanta, Georgia	
1948	Patty Berg	37 holes	Babe Zaharias	Skycrest CC	Chicago, Illinois	
1949	Louise Suggs	5 & 4	Betty Jameson	Oklahoma City CC	Oklahoma City, Oklahoma	
1950	Babe Zaharias	5 & 3	Peggy Kirk	Cherry Hills CC	Denver, Colorado	
1951	Patty Berg	2 up	Pat O'Sullivan*	Whitemarsh Valley CC	Philadelphia, Pennsylvania	
1952	Betsy Rawls	1 up	Betty Jameson	Skokie CC	Chicago, Illinois	
1953	Louise Suggs	6 & 5	Patty Berg	Capital City Club	Atlanta, Georgia	
1954	Betty Jameson	6 & 5	Louise Suggs	Glen Flora CC	Waukegan, Illinois	

=== Stroke play era ===
Year	Champion	Course	Location	Score	To par	Notes
1955	Patty Berg	Maple Bluff CC	Madison, Wisconsin	292	E	
1956	Beverly Hanson	Wakonda CC	Des Moines, Iowa	304	E	
1957	Patty Berg	Montgomery CC	Montgomery, Alabama	291	−1	
1958	Patty Berg	Kahkwa CC	Erie, Pennsylvania	293	+1	
1959	Betsy Rawls	Ranier G&CC	Seattle, Washington	293	−1	
1960	Joyce Ziske †	Beverly CC	Chicago, Illinois	301	+9	^{[a]}
1961	Mary Lena Faulk	Belle Meade CC	Nashville, Tennessee	290	−10	
1962	Mickey Wright †	Montgomery CC	Montgomery, Alabama	295	+7	^{[b]}
1963	Mickey Wright	Maple Bluff CC	Madison, Wisconsin	292	−4	
1964	Carol Mann	Scenic Hills CC	Pensacola, Florida	308	+8	
1965	Susie Maxwell	Beverly CC	Chicago, Illinois	290	−2	
1966	Mickey Wright	Rainbow Springs CC	Mukwonago, Wisconsin	302	+2	
1967	Kathy Whitworth	Pekin CC	Pekin, Illinois	289	−11	

== Multiple winners ==
This table lists the golfers who have won more than one Women's Western Open as a major championship. Bolded years and player name indicates consecutive victories. The (a) denotes amateur golfer.

Grand Slam winners ‡

Country	Golfer	Total	Years
United States	**Patty Berg**	7	1941, 1943, 1948, 1951, 1955, **1957**, **1958**
United States	**Babe Zaharias**	4	1940 (a), **1944 (a)**, **1945 (a)**, 1950
United States	**Louise Suggs** ‡	4	**1946 (a)**, **1947 (a)**, 1949, 1953
United States	**Mickey Wright** ‡	3	**1962**, **1963**, 1966
United States	June Beebe (a)	2	1931, 1933
United States	**Opal Hill** (a)	2	**1935**, **1936**
United States	Betty Jameson	2	1942 (a), 1954
United States	Betsy Rawls	2	1952, 1959

== Winners by nationality ==
This table lists the total number of titles won by golfers of each nationality as a major.

Rank	Nationality	Wins	Winners	First title	Last title
1	United States	38	20	1930	1967

== Notes ==
- **^{a}** Joyce Ziske won in a sudden death playoff over Barbara Romack on the second hole with a par-5 to Romack's bogey 6.
- **^{b}** Mickey Wright won in a sudden death playoff over Mary Lena Faulk on the fourth hole with a par-3 to Faulk's bogey 4.

== See also ==
- Chronological list of LPGA major golf champions
- List of LPGA major championship winning golfers
- Grand Slam (golf)
