= 1961 LPGA Championship =

Coordinates: 36.128°N 115.125°W

Tournament information
- Dates: October 12–15, 1961
- Location: Las Vegas, Nevada
- Course: Stardust Country Club
- Tour: LPGA Tour
- Format: Stroke play – 72 holes

Statistics
- Par: 71
- Cut: none
- Prize fund: $15,000
- Winner's share: $2,500

Champion
- (United States) Mickey Wright
- 287 (+3)

Location in the United States
Location in Nevada

The 1961 LPGA Championship was the seventh LPGA Championship, held October 12–15 at Stardust Country Club in Las Vegas, Nevada.

Defending champion Mickey Wright won the third of her four LPGA Championships, nine strokes ahead of runner-up Louise Suggs, the 1957 winner. It was Wright's third major title of the year and the seventh of her thirteen career majors. It was her tenth tour victory of the 1961 season.

Stardust Country Club opened earlier in the year and hosted the LPGA Championship for six consecutive years, through 1966. After several ownership and name changes, it became Las Vegas National Golf Club in 1998.

The purse was substantially increased in 1961 to $15,000 with a winner's share of $2,500, up from $8,500 and $1,500 in 1960.

== Final leaderboard ==
Sunday, October 15, 1961

Place	Player	Score	To par	Money ($)
1	(United States) Mickey Wright	67-77-72-71=287	+3	2,500
2	(United States) Louise Suggs	74-76-73-71=296	+12	1,900
3	(United States) Betsy Rawls	76-76-71-74=297	+13	1,500
4	(United States) Shirley Englehorn	72-74-77-76=299	+15	1,200
5	(United States) Marilynn Smith	80-75-75-70=300	+16	1,000
T6	(United States) Mary Lena Faulk	75-81-76-70=302	+18	720
T6	(United States) Barbara Romack	75-81-73-73=302	+18	720
8	(United States) Jo Ann Prentice	73-76-78-76=303	+19	530
T9	(United States) Kathy Cornelius	75-79-72-78=304	+20	430
T9	(United States) Ruth Jessen	75-79-76-74=304	+20	430
T9	(United States) Beth Stone	72-83-75-74=304	+20	430
