= 1965 in sports =

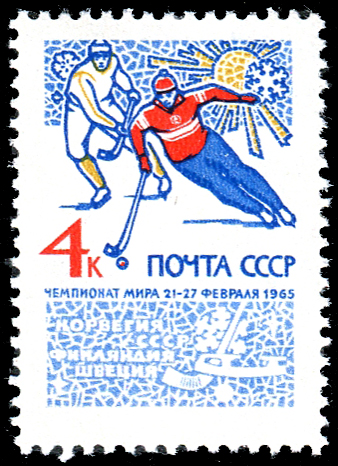
1965 Bandy World Championship on a contemporary Soviet stamp.

1965 in sports describes the year's events in world sport.

== American football ==
- NFL Championship: the Green Bay Packers won 23–12 over the Cleveland Browns at Lambeau Field
  - The game was pushed to January 2, 1966, due to a Western Conference tie–breaker (Green Bay 13, Baltimore 10) on December 26, 1965
- Orange Bowl (1964 season):
  - The Alabama Crimson Tide lose 21–17 to the Texas Longhorns; still named AP & UPI national champions
- AFL Championship – Buffalo Bills win 23–0 over the San Diego Chargers

== Association football ==
=== England ===
- FA Cup final – Liverpool won 2-1 (aet) versus Leeds United

== Australian rules football ==
- Victorian Football League
  - Essendon wins the 69th VFL Premiership (Essendon 14.21 (105) d St Kilda 9.16 (70))
  - Brownlow Medal awarded to Ian Stewart (St Kilda) and Noel Teasdale (North Melbourne)

== Bandy ==
- 1965 Bandy World Championship is won by host nation Soviet Union.

== Baseball ==
- Houston Colt .45's change name to Houston Astros, and Los Angeles Angels change name to California Angels.
- World Series – Los Angeles Dodgers win 4 games to 3 over the Minnesota Twins
- Venezuelan professional baseball club, Tigres de Aragua officially founded in Maracay on October 15.

== Basketball ==
- NCAA Men's Basketball Championship – UCLA Bruins win 91–80 over the Michigan Wolverines
- NBA Finals – Boston Celtics win 4 games to 1 over the Los Angeles Lakers
- Taca Brasil de Basquete, as predecessor for Campeonato Brasileiro de Basquete, a first official game held on November 26 in Brazil.

== Boxing ==
- March 30 – José Torres won the Light Heavyweight Championship of the World, stopping Willie Pastrano in nine rounds, at New York City's Madison Square Garden.

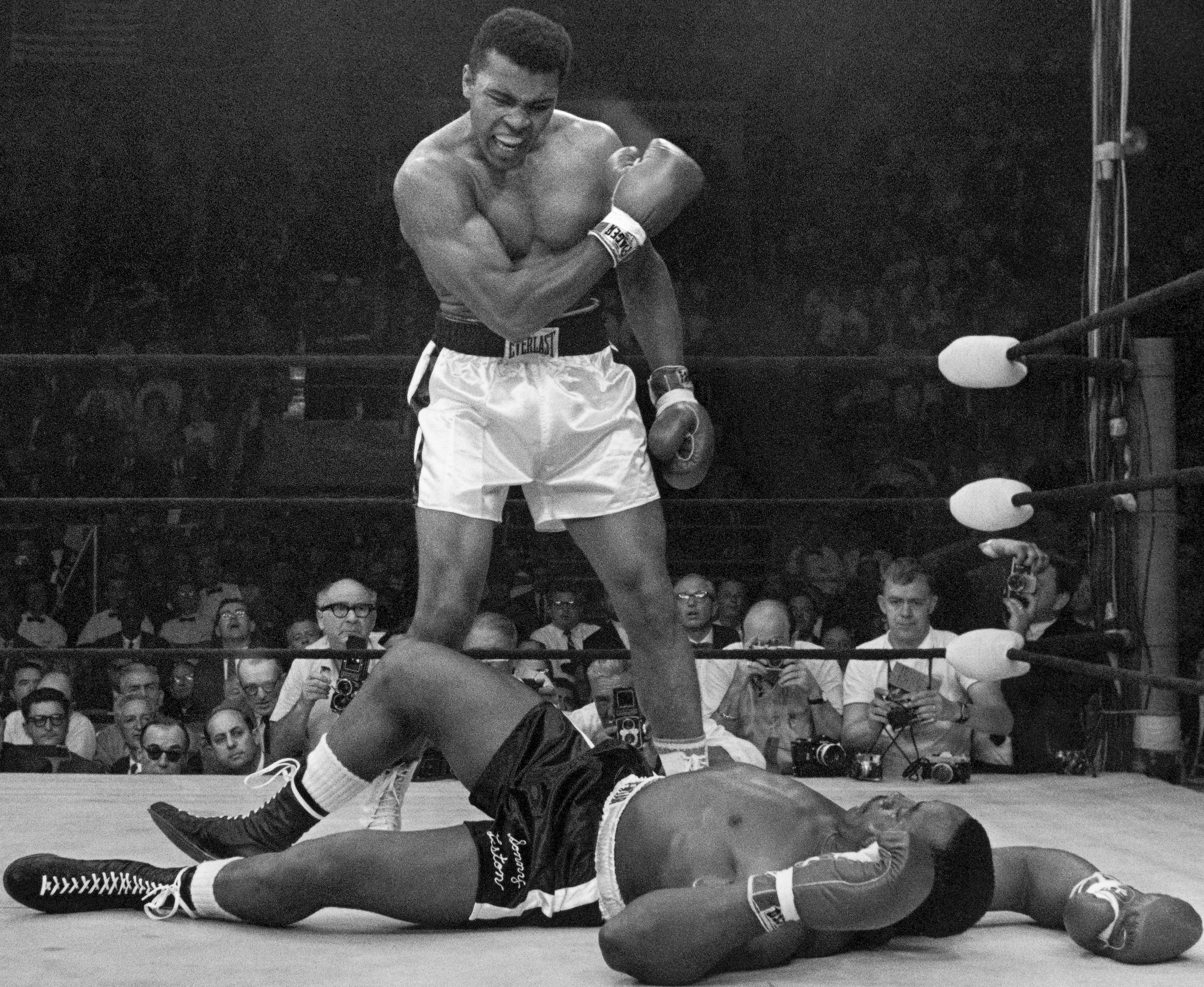
Muhammad Ali standing over Sonny Liston

- May 25 - World heavyweight boxing champion Muhammad Ali won the rematch against former champion Sonny Liston in only 60 seconds into the first round. Ali struck Liston with what would become known as the "Phantom Punch".

== Canadian football ==
- Grey Cup – Hamilton Tiger-Cats win 22–16 over the Winnipeg Blue Bombers
- Vanier Cup – Toronto Varsity Blues win 14–7 over the Alberta Golden Bears
- Canadian Junior Championship – Notre-Dame-de-Grace Maple Leafs win 2–1 over the Edmonton Huskies

== Cricket ==
- Imperial Cricket Conference is renamed to International Cricket Conference and new rules are adopted to permit the election of countries from outside the Commonwealth of Nations.

== Cue sports (pool, snooker, carom billiards) ==
- The Five-pin Billiards Individual World Championship is inaugurated in Santa Fé, Argentina – Manuel Gomez (of Argentina) takes the title.

== Cycling ==
- Giro d'Italia won by Vittorio Adorni of Italy
- Tour de France – Felice Gimondi of Italy
- UCI Road World Championships – Men's road race – Tom Simpson of Great Britain

== Field hockey ==
- March 13 – In an international women's field hockey match at Wembley Stadium, England. South Africa beat England 2–1.

== Figure skating ==
- World Figure Skating Championships
  - Men's champion: Alain Calmat, France
  - Ladies' champion: Petra Burka, Canada
  - Pair skating champions: Ludmila Belousova & Oleg Protopopov, Soviet Union
  - Ice dancing champions: Eva Romanová & Pavel Roman, Czechoslovakia

== Golf ==
Men's professional

- Masters Tournament – Jack Nicklaus shoots a Masters record 271 (17 under par) to win by nine strokes.
- U.S. Open – Gary Player becomes the third golfer in history to win all four professional majors.
- British Open – Peter Thomson
- PGA Championship – Dave Marr
- PGA Tour money leader – Jack Nicklaus – $140,752
- Ryder Cup – United States wins 19½ to 12½ over Britain in team golf.

Men's amateur

- British Amateur – Michael Bonallack
- U.S. Amateur – Bob Murphy

Women's professional

- Women's Western Open – Susie Maxwell
- LPGA Championship – Sandra Haynie
- U.S. Women's Open – Carol Mann
- Titleholders Championship – Kathy Whitworth
- LPGA Tour money leader – Kathy Whitworth – $28,658

== Harness racing ==
- Bret Hanover wins the United States Pacing Triple Crown races –
  1. Cane Pace – Bret Hanover
  2. Little Brown Jug – Bret Hanover
  3. Messenger Stakes – Bret Hanover
- United States Trotting Triple Crown races –
  1. Hambletonian – Egyptian Candor
  2. Yonkers Trot – Noble Victory
  3. Kentucky Futurity – Armbro Flight
- Australian Inter Dominion Harness Racing Championship –
  - Pacers: Jay Ar
  - Trotters: Poupette

== Horse racing ==
Steeplechases

- Cheltenham Gold Cup – Arkle
- Grand National – Jay Trump

Flat races

- Australia – Melbourne Cup won by Light Fingers
- Canada – Queen's Plate won by Whistling Sea
- France – Prix de l'Arc de Triomphe won by Sea Bird
- Ireland – Irish Derby Stakes won by Meadow Court
- English Triple Crown Races:
  1. 2,000 Guineas Stakes – Niksar
  2. The Derby – Sea Bird
  3. St. Leger Stakes – Provoke
- United States Triple Crown Races:
  1. Kentucky Derby – Lucky Debonair
  2. Preakness Stakes – Tom Rolfe
  3. Belmont Stakes – Hail To All

== Ice hockey ==
- Art Ross Trophy as the NHL's leading scorer during the regular season: Stan Mikita, Chicago Black Hawks
- Hart Memorial Trophy for the NHL's Most Valuable Player: Bobby Hull, Chicago Black Hawks
- Stanley Cup – Montreal Canadiens win 4 games to 3 over the Chicago Black Hawks
- World Hockey Championship – Soviet Union defeats Czechoslovakia
- NCAA Men's Ice Hockey Championship – Michigan Technological University Huskies defeat Boston College Eagles 8–2 in Providence, Rhode Island

== Pickleball ==
- The game of Pickleball is invented on Bainbridge Island, Washington.

== Radiosport ==
- Fourth Amateur Radio Direction Finding European Championship held in Warsaw, Poland.

== Rugby league ==
- 1965 Kangaroo tour of New Zealand
- 1965 New Zealand rugby league season
- 1965 NSWRFL season: St George wins the tenth of a record eleven consecutive premierships in the NSWRL. They were not to win again until 1977, then in 1979 which was their last premiership before their 1999 merger with the Illawarra Steelers.
- 1964–65 Northern Rugby Football League season / 1965–66 Northern Rugby Football League season

== Rugby union ==
- 71st Five Nations Championship series is won by Wales

== Snooker ==
- World Snooker Championship challenge matches:
  - John Pulman beats Fred Davis 37–36
  - John Pulman beats Rex Williams 25–22
  - John Pulman beats Fred Van Rensburg 39–12

== Swimming ==
- 1 March – The Amateur Swimming Union of Australia stuns the nation with its decision that Olympic champion and 1964 Australian of the Year Dawn Fraser will be banned from all amateur competition for ten years. The decision follows an inquiry into Fraser's alleged misbehaviour during the 1964 Summer Olympics in Tokyo.
- August 15 – US swimmer Kenis Moore breaks the world record in the women's 200m butterfly (long course) during a meet in Maumee, Ohio, clocking 2:26.3.
- August 21 – Dutch swimming star Ada Kok breaks the world record in the women's 200m butterfly (long course) for the first time, during a meet in Leiden, clocking 2:25.8.
- September 12 – Ada Kok from the Netherlands betters her own world record in the women's 200m butterfly (long course), during a meet in Groningen, clocking 2:25.3.

== Tennis ==
Australia

- Australian Men's Singles Championship – Roy Emerson (Australia) defeats Fred Stolle (Australia) 6–3, 6–4, 6–2
- Australian Women's Singles Championship – Margaret Smith Court (Australia) defeats Lesley Turner Bowrey (Australia) 6–3, 6–2

England

- Wimbledon Men's Singles Championship – Roy Emerson (Australia) defeats Fred Stolle (Australia) 6–4, 12–10, 4–6, 6–3
- Wimbledon Women's Singles Championship – Maria Bueno (Brazil) defeats Margaret Smith Court (Australia) 6–4, 7–9, 6–3

France

- French Men's Singles Championship – Fred Stolle (Australia) defeats Tony Roche (Australia) 3–6, 6–0, 6–2, 6–3
- French Women's Singles Championship – Lesley Turner (Australia) defeats Margaret Court (Australia) 6–3, 6–4

USA

- American Men's Singles Championship – Manuel Santana (Spain) defeats Cliff Drysdale (South Africa) 6–2, 7–9, 7–5, 6–1
- American Women's Singles Championship – Margaret Smith (Australia) defeats Billie Jean Moffitt (USA) 8–6, 7–5

Davis Cup

- 1965 Davis Cup – Australia 4–1 Spain at White City Stadium (grass) Sydney, Australia

== Multi-sport events ==
- First All-Africa Games held in Brazzaville, Republic of the Congo
- Fourth Pan Arab Games held in Cairo, Egypt
- Fourth Summer Universiade held in Budapest, Hungary

== Awards ==
- ABC's Wide World of Sports Athlete of the Year: Jim Clark, Formula One champion and Indianapolis 500 winner
- Associated Press Male Athlete of the Year – Sandy Koufax, Major League Baseball
- Associated Press Female Athlete of the Year – Kathy Whitworth, LPGA golf
