= 1963 Titleholders Championship =

Golf tournament in Augusta, Georgia, US

Tournament information
- Dates: April 25–29, 1963
- Location: Augusta, Georgia; 33.483°N 82.011°W
- Course: Augusta Country Club
- Tour: LPGA Tour
- Format: Stroke play – 72 holes

Statistics
- Par: 72
- Length: 6,300 yards (5,760 m)
- Field: 38
- Prize fund: $7,500
- Winner's share: $1,300

Champion
- (United States) Marilynn Smith
- 292 (+4), playoff
- Location in the United States Location in Georgia

The 1963 Titleholders Championship was the 24th Titleholders Championship, held April 25–29 at Augusta Country Club in Augusta, Georgia.

Two-time defending champion Mickey Wright came from three strokes back on Sunday to tie Marilynn Smith and force the second consecutive playoff at the event.

Tied after nine holes in the 18-hole playoff on Monday, Smith fell three strokes behind, then Wright double-bogeyed the par-3 14th and Smith birdied the 16th to tie. All even on the 18th green, Wright missed a 12-foot (3.7 m) par putt while Smith sank hers from 8 feet (2.4 m) to take her first major title. It was the first of two consecutive wins in the championship for Smith, age 34, which were her only two major titles.

Wright was the 36-hole leader at 146 (+2), a stroke ahead of Smith.

== Final leaderboard ==
Sunday, April 28, 1963

Place	Player	Score	To par	Money ($)
T1	(United States) Marilynn Smith	72-75-69-76=292	+4	Playoff
T1	(United States) Mickey Wright	74-72-73-73=292	+4	Playoff
3	(United States) Betsy Rawls	74-76-70-78=298	+10	800
4	(United States) Jo Ann Prentice	71-77-75-79=302	+14	675
5	(United States) Kathy Whitworth	74-76-77-76=303	+15	575
T6	(United States) Clifford Ann Creed	75-73-78-78=304	+16	456
T6	(United States) Carol Mann	76-72-73-83=304	+16	456
T6	(United States) Sherry Wheeler	80-73-77-74=304	+16	456
T9	(United States) Shirley Englehorn	74-75-76-80=305	+17	300
T9	(United States) Judy Kimball	76-73-78-78=305	+17	300
T9	(United States) Sybil Griffin	75-75-75-80=305	+17	300

=== Playoff ===
Monday, April 29, 1963

Place	Player	Score	To par	Money ($)
1	(United States) Marilynn Smith	35-37=72	E	1,300
2	(United States) Mickey Wright	35-38=73	+1	1,000
