= 1962 Women's Western Open =

Golf tournament

Coordinates: 32.3521°N 86.2807°W

Tournament information
- Dates: May 10–13, 1962
- Location: Montgomery, Alabama
- Course: Montgomery Country Club
- Tour: LPGA Tour
- Format: 72 holes, stroke play

Statistics
- Par: 72
- Length: 6,500 yards (5,900 m)
- Field: 118 players, 31 after cut
- Cut: 161 (+17)
- Prize fund: $7,500
- Winner's share: $1,200

Champion
- Mickey Wright
- 295 (+7)
- Location within the United States Location within Alabama

The 1962 Women's Western Open was contested from May 10–13 at Montgomery Country Club in Montgomery, Alabama. It was the 33rd edition of the Women's Western Open.

This event was won by Mickey Wright on the fourth hole of a sudden-death playoff with Mary Lena Faulk.

== Final leaderboard ==
Place	Player	Score	To par	Money ($)
1	(United States) Mickey Wright	69-74-76-76=295	+7	1,200
2	(United States) Mary Lena Faulk	70-77-73-75=295	+7	950
T3	(United States) Patty Berg	75-68-78-75=296	+8	675
T3	(United States) Ruth Jessen	71-72-76-77=296	+8	675
T5	(United States) Clifford Ann Creed (a)	74-79-73-74=300	+12	0
T5	(United States) Barbara Romack	76-69-74-81=300	+12	520
7	(United States) Jackie Pung	78-69-74-71=302	+14	450
T8	(United States) Gloria Fecht	74-74-75-80=303	+15	355
T8	(United States) Marilynn Smith	75-72-79-77=303	+15	355
T10	(United States) Betty Jameson	72-77-76-79=304	+16	270
T10	(United States) Betsy Rawls	74-76-76-78=304	+16	270
