= 1962 Titleholders Championship =

Golf tournament in Augusta, Georgia, US

Tournament information
- Dates: April 26–30, 1962
- Location: Augusta, Georgia; 33.483°N 82.011°W
- Course: Augusta Country Club
- Tour: LPGA Tour
- Format: Stroke play – 72 holes

Statistics
- Par: 72
- Length: 6,300 yards (5,760 m)
- Prize fund: $8,000
- Winner's share: $1,400

Champion
- (United States) Mickey Wright
- 295 (+7), playoff
- Location in the United States Location in Georgia

The 1962 Titleholders Championship was the 23rd Titleholders Championship, held April 26–30 at Augusta Country Club in Augusta, Georgia.

Defending champion Mickey Wright sank a ten-foot (3 m) putt for par on the 72nd hole to tie Ruth Jessen and force the first playoff in the event's history. Wright won the 18-hole playoff by three strokes, 69 to 72, to repeat as champion.

Barbara Romack held a five-shot lead after 36 holes, but finished two strokes back in solo third.

== Final leaderboard ==
Sunday, April 29, 1962

Place	Player	Score	To par	Money ($)
T1	(United States) Mickey Wright	73-75-70-77=295	+7	Playoff
T1	(United States) Ruth Jessen	74-74-70-77=295	+7	Playoff
3	(United States) Barbara Romack	73-70-79-75=297	+9	800
4	(United States) Patty Berg	75-74-72-77=298	+10	675
5	(United States) Mary Lena Faulk	75-76-74-74=299	+11	550
6	(United States) Marilynn Smith	75-73-77-75=300	+12	500
7	(United States) Kathy Whitworth	74-74-80-73=301	+13	450
8	(United States) Jo Ann Prentice	73-77-73-79=302	+14	400
9	(United States) Kathy Cornelius	76-73-73-81=303	+15	350
10	(United States) Shirley Englehorn	77-78-72-77=304	+16	300

=== Playoff ===
Monday, April 30, 1962

Place	Player	Score	To par	Money ($)
1	(United States) Mickey Wright	34-35=69	−3	1,400
2	(United States) Ruth Jessen	37-35=72	E	1,100
