= Idaho Centennial Ladies' Open =

Golf tournament formerly on the LPGA Tour

Coordinates: 43.586°N 116.239°W

Tournament information
- Location: Boise, Idaho
- Established: 1963
- Course: Hillcrest Country Club
- Par: 71
- Tour: LPGA Tour
- Format: Stroke play - 54 holes
- Prize fund: $7,500
- Month played: August - September
- Final year: 1963

Tournament record score
- Aggregate: 210 Mickey Wright (1963)
- To par: −3 Mickey Wright (1963)

Final champion
- (United States) Mickey Wright

Location in the United States

The Idaho Centennial Ladies' Open was a women's professional golf tournament on the LPGA Tour, played only in 1963 in Boise, Idaho. The 54-hole event was held 63 years ago at Hillcrest Country Club over the Labor Day weekend, Saturday through Monday.

Mickey Wright won the event by four strokes over runner-up Kathy Whitworth; both players shot 68 (−3) in the final round. Tied for third at 215 (+2) were Shirley Englehorn of Caldwell and Marlene Hagge. It was Wright's 10th of 13 victories on the LPGA Tour in 1963, and her 49th of 82 career wins. Whitworth won the previous week in Ogden, Utah, and the following week in Spokane, Washington.

The centennial referred to the establishment of the Idaho Territory in 1863; statehood for Idaho came 27 years later in 1890.

== Winner ==
Year	Date	Champion	Country	Winning score	To par	Margin of victory	Runner-up	Purse ($)	Winner's share ($)
1963	Sep 2	Mickey Wright	United States	72-70-68=210	−3	4 strokes	(United States) Kathy Whitworth	7,500	1,200
