= Palm Beach County Open =

Golf tournament formerly on the LPGA Tour

The Palm Beach County Open was a golf tournament on the LPGA Tour, played only in 1968. It was played at the Cypress Creek Country Club in Boynton Beach, Florida. Mickey Wright won the event by four strokes over Ruth Jessen and Carol Mann.
