= 1963 LPGA Championship =

Coordinates: 36.128°N 115.125°W

Tournament information
- Dates: October 10–13, 1963
- Location: Las Vegas, Nevada
- Course: Stardust Country Club
- Tour: LPGA Tour
- Format: Stroke play – 72 holes

Statistics
- Par: 71
- Field: 47 players
- Cut: none
- Prize fund: $16,500
- Winner's share: $2,450

Champion
- (United States) Mickey Wright
- 294 (+10)

Location in the United States
Location in Nevada

The 1963 LPGA Championship was the ninth LPGA Championship, held October 10–13 at Stardust Country Club in Las Vegas, Nevada.

After a second round 82 (+11), Mickey Wright shot 70 (−1) in both of the final two rounds to win her fourth and final LPGA Championship, two strokes ahead of runners-up Mary Lena Faulk, Mary Mills, and Louise Suggs. Defending champion Judy Kimball finished six strokes back, in a tie for ninth place. It was Wright's second major title of the year and the eleventh of her thirteen career majors. It was her thirteenth tour victory of the 1963 season.

It was the third of six consecutive LPGA Championships at Stardust, which opened two years earlier. After several ownership and name changes, it became Las Vegas National Golf Club in 1998.

== Final leaderboard ==
Sunday, October 13, 1963

Place	Player	Score	To par	Money ($)
1	(United States) Mickey Wright	72-82-70-70=294	+10	2,450
T2	(United States) Mary Lena Faulk	74-78-72-72=296	+12	1,533
T2	(United States) Mary Mills	73-76-75-72=296	+12	1,533
T2	(United States) Louise Suggs	70-78-73-75=296	+12	1,533
5	(United States) Ruth Jessen	77-83-67-71=298	+14	1,030
T6	(United States) Carol Mann	75-75-77-72=299	+15	770
T6	(United States) Betsy Rawls	74-73-76-76=299	+15	770
T6	(United States) Kathy Whitworth	75-79-73-72=299	+15	770
T9	(United States) Kathy Cornelius	73-75-75-77=300	+16	503
T9	(United States) Sandra Haynie	77-77-75-71=300	+16	503
T9	(United States) Judy Kimball	73-81-73-73=300	+16	503
T9	(United States) Marilynn Smith	76-77-71-76=300	+16	503
