= 1966 Women's Western Open =

Golf tournament

Coordinates: 42.8118°N 88.3712°W

Tournament information
- Dates: August 18–21, 1966
- Location: Mukwonago, Wisconsin
- Course: Rainbow Springs Country Club
- Tour: LPGA Tour
- Format: 72 holes, stroke play

Statistics
- Par: 72
- Length: 6,415 yards (5,866 m)
- Field: 99 players, 38 after cut
- Cut: 166 (+16)
- Prize fund: $10,000
- Winner's share: $1,500

Champion
- Mickey Wright
- 302 (+2)
- Location within the United States Location within Wisconsin

The 1966 Women's Western Open was contested from August 18–21 at Rainbow Springs Country Club in Mukwonago, Wisconsin. It was the 37th edition of the Women's Western Open.

This event was won by Mickey Wright.

== Final leaderboard ==
Place	Player	Score	To par	Money ($)
1	(United States) Mickey Wright	72-78-76-76=302	+2	1,500
T2	(Australia) Margie Masters	73-79-78-73=303	+3	1,100
T2	(United States) Jo Ann Prentice	79-73-73-78=303	+3	1,100
4	(United States) Kathy Whitworth	74-79-74-77=304	+4	800
5	(United States) Mary Mills	75-78-77-77=307	+7	675
6	(United States) Judy Kimball	81-76-79-72=308	+8	500
7	(United States) Betsy Rawls	79-79-74-77=309	+9	450
8	(United States) Sybil Griffin	77-79-78-77=311	+11	420
9	(United States) Clifford Ann Creed	79-78-79-76=312	+12	370
T10	(United States) Gloria Ehret	81-82-79-73=315	+15	315
T10	(United States) Shirley Englehorn	79-80-82-74=315	+15	315
