= Visalia Country Club =

Golf only club in California

Coordinates: 36.334673°N 119.31706°W

- Interactive map of Visalia Country Club

Club information
- Location: 625 N Ranch Street; Visalia, California
- Established: 1922
- Type: Private
- Total holes: 18
- Website: Visalia Country Club

Course
- Par: 72
- Length: 6,668
- Course rating: 72

The Visalia Country Club is a golf only club in Visalia, California.

It is a relatively flat course with medium-sized greens. The greens are traditionally known for being real smooth and fast. The oak and pine trees form tree-lines along the fairways. There are grass and sand bunkers around the greens and on the fairways. There are about four to five bunkers per hole. Water hazards (three ponds) come into play on six holes. The signature hole is #16, a 150-yard, par 3, requiring a tee shot over water to a green that is surrounded by trees and bunkers.

== History ==
On January 27, 1922 a meeting was held in the Visalia Municipal Auditorium for the purposes of organizing a golf club. Mr. Harvey V.E. Gilmer spearheaded the effort. The lack of awareness of the sport at that time made it somewhat of a challenge to arrange the initial subscriptions, but upon collecting twenty-five hundred dollars, property was leased from Dick Hyde. The first membership sold for fifty dollars, and the dues were five dollars per month.

The Visalia Golf Club began with three holes, still existing today as numbers 11, 12 and 13. "Greens" were oiled sand, which needed smoothing before every putt. The tee areas were asphalt slabs. In 1926, six more holes were added and the sand greens were replaced with grass greens. Two years later the original clubhouse was erected. Later in the year, a clubhouse building committee was formed; plans were drawn up & accepted. W.R. Spalding (whose house still stands today in downtown and serves as one of Visalia’s two B&B’s) donated lumber for the new clubhouse. Members were asked to provide additional donations, and were enthusiastically willing – even non-members donated. The original clubhouse and greens had been constructed for a cost of $6400. The original clubhouse measured 16 feet by 24 feet, and burned to the ground in 1927. It was re-built the same year.

In April 1942, during World War II, Bob Hope, Bing Crosby, Johnny Weissmuller and an outstanding amateur from Los Angeles, Johnny Dawson, played an exhibition golf match at the club. While no records survive to document the victor of the match, the real winner was the Visalia Chapter of the American Red Cross, to whom the proceeds were donated.

The design of the fairways was determined in part by the famous Jennings Ditch which wanders throughout the entire length of the course. In 1950, Mill Creek, which supplied water for the Jennings Ditch, was diverted, leaving a dry ditch which is still visible throughout the course and particularly along the right side of the #9 fairway and the lake between #17 and #18. In that same year, the official name of the club was changed to Visalia Country Club. By 1952, the club added nine more holes to reach the present eighteen. In 1953, a new clubhouse was built at the site of today’s snack bar – the cost of the new clubhouse increased from that of the original to a reported $120,000, and was entirely financed voluntarily by donations from the members.

From 1962 until 1965, the club hosted the Visalia Open on the LPGA Tour. Many famous women golfers played in the events, including Mickey Wright, Betsy Rawls, Kathy Whitworth, Patty Berg and Judy Rankin. When the LPGA raised the required prize money to $15,000 the membership concluded the investment was too great and ended their relationship with the tour.

The oldest Valley Oak Tree in Visalia sits right next to the #18 tee box. The estimated age of the oak tree is 276 years old.
