= 1960 LPGA Championship =

Coordinates: 38.528°N 86.648°W

Tournament information
- Dates: July 1–4, 1960
- Location: French Lick, Indiana
- Course: Sheraton Hotel Country Club
- Tour: LPGA Tour
- Format: Stroke play – 72 holes

Statistics
- Par: 74
- Length: 6,623 yards (6,056 m)
- Field: 27 players
- Cut: none
- Prize fund: $8,500
- Winner's share: $1,500

Champion
- (United States) Mickey Wright
- 292 (−4)

Location in the United States
Location in Indiana

The 1960 LPGA Championship was the sixth LPGA Championship, held July 1–4 at Sheraton Hotel Country Club in French Lick, Indiana.

Mickey Wright won the second of her four LPGA Championships, three strokes ahead of Louise Suggs, the 1957 winner. Defending champion Betsy Rawls finished nine strokes back in third place. It was the fourth of thirteen major titles for Wright.

The course was designed by Donald Ross; it opened in 1917 and was originally known as the "Hill Course." It hosted the PGA Championship in 1924, the second of five won by Walter Hagen and the first of four consecutive. It is now named the "Donald Ross Course." It was the second consecutive year for the LPGA Championship at the course.

== Final leaderboard ==
Monday, July 4, 1960

Place	Player	Score	To par	Money ($)
1	(United States) Mickey Wright	71-76-74-71=292	−4	1,500
2	(United States) Louise Suggs	74-72-76-73=295	−1	1,150
3	(United States) Betsy Rawls	74-79-70-78=301	+5	860
4	(United States) Patty Berg	77-76-76-77=306	+10	720
5	(United States) Wiffi Smith	83-77-71-76=307	+11	630
6	(Uruguay) Fay Crocker	77-77-75-79=308	+12	540
7	(United States) Kathy Cornelius	73-79-81-76=309	+13	470
T8	(United States) Joyce Ziske	75-79-75-81=310	+14	385
T8	(United States) Mary Lena Faulk	76-78-80-76=310	+14	385
10	(United States) Marlene Hagge	74-79-78-80=311	+15	320
