= Salt Lake City Open =

Salt Lake City Open may refer to:

- Riverside Ladies Open, a golf tournament called the Salt Lake City Open in 1962
- Salt Lake City Open (tennis)
