= 1965 Women's Western Open =

Golf tournament

Coordinates: 41°44′05″N 87°41′05″W

Tournament information
- Dates: June 10–13, 1965
- Location: Chicago, Illinois
- Course: Beverly Country Club
- Tour: LPGA Tour
- Format: 72 holes, stroke play

Statistics
- Par: 73
- Length: 6,399 yards (5,851 m)
- Field: 103 players, 38 after cut
- Cut: 175 (+29)
- Prize fund: $9,000
- Winner's share: $1,500

Champion
- Susie Maxwell
- 290 (−2)
- Location within the United States Location within Illinois

The 1965 Women's Western Open was contested June 10–13 at Beverly Country Club in Chicago, Illinois. It was the 36th edition of the Women's Western Open.

This event was won by Susie Maxwell.

== Final leaderboard ==
Place	Player	Score	To par	Money ($)
1	(United States) Susie Maxwell	73-72-76-69=290	−2	1,500
2	(United States) Marlene Hagge	73-74-72-74=293	+1	1,200
3	(United States) Sandra Haynie	74-75-76-72=297	+5	1,000
4	(United States) Mary Mills	80-73-75-73=301	+9	800
5	(United States) Kathy Whitworth	78-78-76-72=304	+12	675
T6	(United States) Clifford Ann Creed	76-77-78-74=305	+13	487
T6	(Australia) Margie Masters	72-78-78-77=305	+13	487
T6	(United States) Mickey Wright	77-74-74-80=305	+13	487
9	(United States) Patty Berg	84-76-72-74=306	+14	370
10	(United States) Carol Mann	77-73-80-77=307	+15	330
