= 1963 Women's Western Open =

Golf tournament

Coordinates: 43.1142°N 89.37°W

Tournament information
- Dates: June 20–23, 1963
- Location: Madison, Wisconsin
- Course: Maple Bluff Country Club
- Tour: LPGA Tour
- Format: 72 holes, stroke play

Statistics
- Par: 74
- Length: 6,365 yards (5,820 m)
- Field: 102 players, 32 after cut
- Cut: 167 (+19)
- Prize fund: $7,500
- Winner's share: $1,200

Champion
- Mickey Wright
- 292 (−4)
- Location within the United States Location within Wisconsin

The 1963 Women's Western Open was contested from June 20–23 at Maple Bluff Country Club in Madison, Wisconsin. It was the 34th edition of the Women's Western Open.

This event was won by Mickey Wright.

== Final leaderboard ==
Place	Player	Score	To par	Money ($)
1	(United States) Mickey Wright	78-70-71-73=292	−4	1,200
2	(United States) Kathy Whitworth	79-72-75-75=301	+5	950
3	(United States) Marilynn Smith	72-75-80-76=303	+7	750
4	(United States) Sandra Haynie	81-75-76-76=308	+12	600
5	(United States) Marlene Bauer Hagge	82-74-75-78=309	+13	520
T6	(United States) Betsy Rawls	77-77-70-79=313	+17	415
T6	(United States) Peggy Wilson	77-78-77-81=313	+17	415
T8	(United States) Kathy Cornelius	81-78-81-74=314	+18	310
T8	(United States) Barbara Romack	79-82-76-77=314	+18	310
T10	(United States) Judy Kimball	78-81-80-77=316	+20	250
T10	(United States) Nancy Roth (a)	82-76-78-80=316	+20	0
