= Clock Open =

Golf tournament formerly on the LPGA Tour

The Clock Open was a golf tournament on the LPGA Tour from 1955 to 1956. It was played at the Clock Country Club in Whittier, California.

== Winners ==
- 1956 Marlene Hagge
- 1955 Patty Berg
