= Valhalla Open =

Golf tournament formerly on the LPGA Tour

The Valhalla Open was a golf tournament on the LPGA Tour, played only in 1964. It was played at the Inglewood Country Club in Seattle, Washington. Betsy Rawls won the event by three strokes over Ruth Jessen and Kathy Whitworth.
