= Mayfair Open =

Golf tournament formerly on the LPGA Tour

The Mayfair Open, also sometimes referred to as the Sanford Women's Open, was a golf tournament on the LPGA Tour, played only in 1959. It was played at the Mayfair Country Club in Sanford, Florida. Marlene Hagge won the event.

Barbara Romack, winner of the U.S. Women's Amateur in 1954, made her professional debut at the event.
