= 1961 Titleholders Championship =

Golf tournament in Augusta, Georgia, US

Tournament information
- Dates: April 27–30, 1961
- Location: Augusta, Georgia; 33.483°N 82.011°W
- Course: Augusta Country Club
- Tour: LPGA Tour
- Format: Stroke play – 72 holes

Statistics
- Par: 72
- Length: 6,302 yards (5,763 m)
- Prize fund: $6,500
- Winner's share: $1,200

Champion
- (United States) Mickey Wright
- 299 (+11)
- Location in the United States Location in Georgia

The 1961 Titleholders Championship was the 22nd Titleholders Championship, held April 27–30 at Augusta Country Club in Augusta, Georgia. Mickey Wright won the first of two consecutive Titleholders, one stroke ahead of runners-up Patty Berg and Louise Suggs.

It was the fifth of Wright's thirteen major titles and her 22nd victory on tour.

Wright was tied with Kathy Cornelius for the 36-hole lead at 147 (+3).

== Final leaderboard ==
Sunday, April 30, 1961

Place	Player	Score	To par	Money ($)
1	(United States) Mickey Wright	72-75-76-76=299	+11	1,200
T2	(United States) Patty Berg	75-75-74-76=300	+12	800
T2	(United States) Louise Suggs	76-74-72-78=300	+12	800
4	(United States) Kathy Cornelius	74-73-79-75=301	+13	600
5	(United States) Betty Jameson	78-71-80-73=302	+14	475
6	(United States) Betsy Rawls	77-77-75-74=303	+15	425
7	(United States) Ruth Jessen	79-75-79-74=307	+19	375
8	(United States) Beverly Hanson	80-72-77-78=308	+20	325
9	(United States) Kathy Whitworth	77-75-79-78=309	+21	275
10	(United States) Beth Stone	77-75-76-83=310	+22	250
