= 1965 Titleholders Championship =

Golf tournament in Augusta, Georgia, US

Tournament information
- Dates: November 25–28, 1965
- Location: Augusta, Georgia; 33.483°N 82.011°W
- Course: Augusta Country Club
- Tour: LPGA Tour
- Format: Stroke play – 72 holes

Statistics
- Par: 72
- Prize fund: $10,000
- Winner's share: $1,500

Champion
- (United States) Kathy Whitworth
- 287 (−1)
- Location in the United States Location in Georgia

The 1965 Titleholders Championship was the 26th Titleholders Championship, held November 25–28 at Augusta Country Club in Augusta, Georgia. The previous editions had been played in late April; this year's championship was moved to late November, played over the Thanksgiving weekend and the last event of the 1965 season.

Kathy Whitworth, age 26, won the first of her six major titles, ten strokes ahead of runner-up Peggy Wilson, with defending champion Marilynn Smith a stroke back in third place.

With a 287 (−1), Whitworth broke the 72-hole scoring record by two strokes, set by Smith the previous year. It was her 19th victory on the LPGA Tour and eighth of the 1965 season.

Whitworth had five-stroke leads after 36 holes at 142 (−2), and after 54 holes at 216 (even).

== Final leaderboard ==
Sunday, November 28, 1965

| Place | Player | Score | To par | Money ($) |
|---|---|---|---|---|
| 1 | (United States) Kathy Whitworth | 71-71-74-71=287 | −1 | 1,500 |
| 2 | (United States) Peggy Wilson | 76-72-76-73=297 | +9 | 1,200 |
| 3 | (United States) Marilynn Smith | 74-74-74-76=298 | +10 | 1,000 |
| 4 | (United States) Wanda Sanches | 73-74-74-80=301 | +13 | 800 |
| T5 | (United States) Clifford Ann Creed | 77-75-75-75=302 | +14 | 534 |
| T5 | (United States) Marlene Hagge | 73-76-78-75=302 | +14 | 534 |
| T5 | (United States) Sandra Haynie | 71-77-75-79=302 | +14 | 534 |
| T5 | (United States) Carol Mann | 73-74-78-77=302 | +14 | 534 |
| T9 | (United States) Gloria Armstrong | 78-77-76-73=304 | +16 | 333 |
| T9 | (United States) Sybil Griffin | 80-76-74-74=304 | +16 | 333 |
| T9 | (United States) Judy Rankin | 81-76-72-75=304 | +16 | 333 |
