= Spokane Women's Open =

Golf tournament formerly on the LPGA Tour

Tournament information
- Location: Spokane, Washington
- Established: 1959
- Course: Esmeralda Golf Club
- Par: 72 (70 in 1963)
- Tour: LPGA Tour
- Format: Stroke play - 72 holes (54 holes in 1963)
- Prize fund: $9,000
- Month played: August/September
- Final year: 1963

Tournament record score
- Aggregate: 275 Mickey Wright (1962)
- To par: −13 Mickey Wright (1962)

Final champion
- (United States) Kathy Whitworth

The Spokane Women's Open was a professional golf tournament on the LPGA Tour from 1959 to 1963, played in Spokane, Washington. It was held at the recently constructed Esmeralda Golf Course, a municipal facility in northeast Spokane. Originally a 72-hole event at par-72, it was reduced to 54 holes at par-70 for its final edition.

== Winners ==
Year	Dates	Champion	Country	Winning score	To par	Margin of victory	Runner-up	Purse ($)	Winner's share ($)
1963	Sep 6–8	Kathy Whitworth	United States	67-70-73=210	E	2 strokes	(United States) Marilynn Smith	9,000	1,250
1962	Aug 31 – Sep 3	Mickey Wright	United States	68-68-70-69=275	−13	9 strokes	(United States) Kathy Whitworth	9,000	1,250
1961	Aug 24–27	Mickey Wright	United States	72-72-67-69=280	−8	4 strokes	(United States) Betsy Rawls	7,500	1,247
1960	No tournament								
1959	Aug 20–23	Beverly Hanson	United States	73-70-70-74=287	−1	2 strokes	(United States) Louise Suggs (United States) Mickey Wright	7,500	1,247
