= Grossinger Open =

Golf tournament formerly on the LPGA Tour

The Grossinger Open was a golf tournament on the LPGA Tour, played only in 1960. It was played at the Grossinger Resort in Liberty, New York. Mickey Wright won the event.
