= List of golfers with most LPGA Tour wins =

This table lists 60 players with 10 or more wins on the LPGA Tour. It is based on the list on the LPGA Tour's official site, which differs slightly from the main win lists on player's personal profiles on the site. The wins counted here include professional titles won before the tour was founded in 1950; and LPGA Tour events won as an amateur, or as an international invitee before joining the LPGA Tour. They do not include team events, unofficial events, or official wins on other professional tours, of which a few of the golfers listed, such as Laura Davies and Annika Sörenstam, have many.

The list is complete as of October 4, 2026. Members of the World Golf Hall of Fame are annotated HoF. Golfers listed in bold are active on the LPGA Tour as of 2026.

Rank	Name	Lifespan	Country	Wins	Majors	Winning span
1	Kathy Whitworth HoF	1939–2022	United States	88	6	1962–1985
2	Mickey Wright HoF	1935–2020	United States	82	13	1956–1973
3	Annika Sörenstam HoF	1970–	Sweden	72	10	1995–2008
4	Louise Suggs HoF	1923–2015	United States	61	11	1946–1962
5	Patty Berg HoF	1918–2006	United States	60	15	1937–1962
6	Betsy Rawls HoF	1928–2023	United States	55	8	1951–1972
7	Nancy Lopez HoF	1957–	United States	48	3	1978–1997
8	JoAnne Carner HoF	1939–	United States	43	2	1969–1985
9	Sandra Haynie HoF	1943–	United States	42	4	1962–1982
T10	Babe Zaharias HoF	1911–1956	United States	41	10	1940–1955
T10	Karrie Webb HoF	1974–	Australia	41	7	1995–2014
12	Carol Mann HoF	1941–2018	United States	38	2	1964–1975
13	Patty Sheehan HoF	1956–	United States	35	6	1981–1996
14	Betsy King HoF	1955–	United States	34	6	1984–2001
15	Beth Daniel HoF	1956–	United States	33	1	1979–2003
T16	Pat Bradley HoF	1951–	United States	31	6	1976–1995
T16	Juli Inkster HoF	1960–	United States	31	7	1983–2006
18	Amy Alcott HoF	1956–	United States	29	5	1975–1991
T19	Jane Blalock	1945–	United States	27	0	1970–1985
T19	Lorena Ochoa HoF	1981–	Mexico	27	2	2004–2009
T21	Marlene Hagge HoF	1934–2023	United States	26	1	1952–1972
T21	Judy Rankin HoF	1945–	United States	26	0	1968–1979
23	Se Ri Pak HoF	1977–	South Korea	25	5	1998–2010
24	Donna Caponi HoF	1945–	United States	24	4	1969–1981
25	**Lydia Ko**	1997–	New Zealand	23	3	2012–2025
T26	Marilynn Smith HoF	1929–2019	United States	21	2	1954–1972
T26	Inbee Park HoF	1988–	South Korea	21	7	2008–2021
T28	Laura Davies HoF	1963–	England	20	4	1987–2001
T28	Cristie Kerr	1977–	United States	20	2	2002–2017
T30	**Nelly Korda**	1998–	United States	19	4	2018–2026
T30	Sandra Palmer HoF	1943–	United States	19	2	1971–1986
T32	Meg Mallon HoF	1963–	United States	18	4	1991–2004
T32	Hollis Stacy HoF	1954–	United States	18	4	1977–1991
T34	Beverly Hanson HoF	1924–2014	United States	17	3	1950–1960
T34	Ayako Okamoto HoF	1951–	Japan	17	0	1982–1992
T34	Dottie Pepper	1965–	United States	17	2	1989–2000
37	Jan Stephenson HoF	1951–	Australia	16	3	1976–1987
T38	Sally Little	1951–	South Africa; United States	15	2	1976–1988
T38	Suzann Pettersen	1981–	Norway	15	2	2007–2015
T38	**Yani Tseng**	1989–	Taiwan	15	5	2008–2012
T38	**Ko Jin-young**	1995–	South Korea	15	2	2017–2023
42	**Brooke Henderson**	1997–	Canada	14	2	2015–2025
T43	Betty Jameson HoF	1919–2009	United States	13	3	1942–1955
T43	Rosie Jones	1959–	United States	13	0	1987–2003
T43	Liselotte Neumann	1966–	Sweden	13	1	1988–2004
T43	Stacy Lewis	1985–	United States	13	2	2011–2020
T43	**Kim Sei-young**	1993–	South Korea	13	1	2015–2025
T48	**Ariya Jutanugarn**	1995–	Thailand	12	2	2016–2021
T48	**Jeeno Thitikul**	2003–	Thailand	12	0	2022–2026
T50	Clifford Ann Creed	1938–	United States	11	0	1964–1967
T50	Fay Crocker	1914–1983	Uruguay	11	2	1955–1960
T50	Shirley Englehorn	1940–2022	United States	11	1	1962–1970
T50	Ruth Jessen	1936–2007	United States	11	0	1959–1971
T50	Susie Berning HoF	1941–2024	United States	11	4	1965–1976
T50	Jane Geddes	1960–	United States	11	2	1986–1994
T50	**Minjee Lee**	1996–	Australia	11	3	2015–2025
T50	Jiyai Shin	1988–	South Korea	11	2	2008–2013
T50	**Lexi Thompson**	1995–	United States	11	1	2011–2019
T59	Mary Lena Faulk	1926–1995	United States	10	1	1956–1964
T59	Paula Creamer	1986–	United States	10	1	2005–2014
T59	Shanshan Feng	1989–	China	10	1	2012–2019

"T" indicates tied for ranking position
