= Alliance Machine International Open =

Golf tournament formerly on the LPGA Tour

The Alliance Machine International Open was a golf tournament on the LPGA Tour, played only in 1959. It was played at the Alliance Country Club in Alliance, Ohio. Mickey Wright won the event.
