= Charity Golf Classic =

Golf tournament in Texas, US (1973–1975)

The Charity Golf Classic was a golf tournament on the LPGA Tour from 1973 to 1975. It was played at the Woodhaven Country Club in Fort Worth, Texas. Sandra Haynie won all three editions of the event.

== Winners ==
- 1975 Sandra Haynie
- 1974 Sandra Haynie
- 1973 Sandra Haynie
