= Springfield Jaycee Open =

Golf tournament formerly on the LPGA Tour

The Springfield Jaycee Open was a golf tournament on the LPGA Tour from 1969 to 1970. It was played at the Northwood Hills Country Club in Springfield, Ohio.

== Winners ==
Springfield Jaycee Open

- 1970 Judy Rankin

Stroh's-WBLY Open

- 1969 Marlene Hagge
