= Cavalier Open =

Golf tournament formerly on the LPGA Tour

The Cavalier Open was a golf tournament on the LPGA Tour, played only in 1959. It was played at the Cavalier Yacht & Country Club in Virginia Beach, Virginia. Mickey Wright won the event.
