= Lawson's LPGA Classic =

Golf tournament formerly on the LPGA Tour

The Lawson's LPGA Classic was a golf tournament on the LPGA Tour from 1974 to 1975. It was played at the Weymouth Valley Country Club in Medina, Ohio.

== Winners ==
Lawson's LPGA Classic

- 1975 Carol Mann

Lawson's LPGA Open

- 1974 Sandra Haynie
