= Royal Poinciana Invitational =

Golf tournament

The Royal Poinciana Invitational was a golf tournament on the LPGA Tour in 1961 and 1962. It was played at Palm Beach Golf Club in Palm Beach, Florida, a Dick Wilson and Joe Lee-designed Par-3 course. The tournament was one of the first in professional golf featuring a Battle of the Sexes concept, with a Par 3 course that neutralised power and emphasised precision golf.

In 1961, the field consisted of 24 men and women, both amateurs and professionals. The tournament was 54 holes and won by Louise Suggs by one stroke over local pro Dub Pagan. Sam Snead was third, two shots behind.

In 1962, the Battle of the Sexes concept was changed to 14 LPGA professionals versus one man, PGA of America superstar Sam Snead (the modern touring professional division would not happen until 1968). The tournament was played over 72 holes. Snead won by five strokes over future Hall-of-Famer Mickey Wright, making him the only man to win an official LPGA Tour event. Both won 82 tournaments in their primary tours during their careers, making the Snead-Wright battle unique in that it was an official tournament.

Professional golf's Battle of the Sexes concept has been tried in mostly exhibition events, but would not return until the 2019 Jordan Mixed Open presented by Ayla, when the Challenge Tour, the European Senior Tour and the Ladies European Tour participated in an official event for all three tours.

The course was purchased by the city of Palm Beach in 1973, and redesigned by PGA Tour legend Raymond Floyd in 2009.

== Winners ==
Royal Poinciana Plaza Invitational

- 1962 Sam Snead (overall)
  Mickey Wright (top woman)

Royal Poinciana Invitational

- 1961 Louise Suggs
