= Austin Civitan Open =

Golf tournament formerly on the LPGA Tour

The Austin Civitan Open was a golf tournament on the LPGA Tour, played only in 1962. It was played at the Austin Country Club in Austin, Texas. Sandra Haynie won the event. It was the first of forty-two career LPGA Tour wins.
