= Pensacola Ladies Invitational =

Golf tournament formerly on the LPGA Tour

Tournament information
- Location: Pensacola, Florida
- Established: 1965
- Course: Scenic Hills Country Club
- Tour: LPGA Tour
- Prize fund: $1,875 (1968)
- Final year: 1968

Final champion
- Kathy Whitworth
- Location in the United States Location in Florida

The Pensacola Ladies Invitational was a golf tournament on the LPGA Tour from 1965 to 1968. It was played at the Scenic Hills Country Club in Pensacola, Florida.

== Winners ==
Pensacola Invitational

- 1965 Betsy Rawls

Pensacola Ladies Invitational

- 1966 Sandra Haynie
- 1967 Mickey Wright
- 1968 Kathy Whitworth
