= Clifford Ann Creed =

American professional golfer (born 1938)

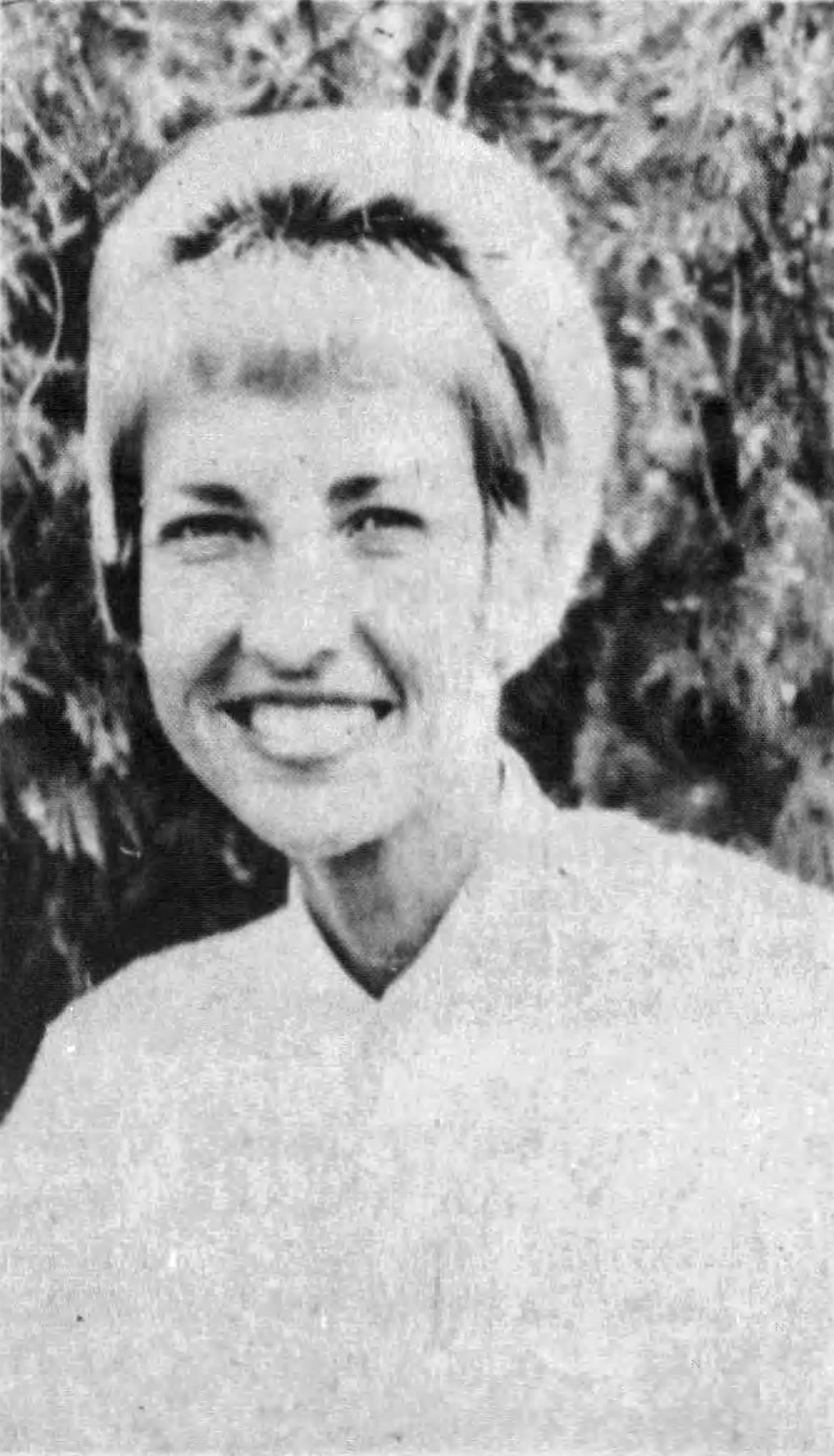
- Creed in 1967

Personal information
- Full name: Clifford Ann Creed
- Nationality: United States
- Born: September 23, 1938 (age 88) Alexandria, Louisiana, U.S.
- Height: 5 ft 4 in (1.63 m)

Career
- Sport: Golf
- College: Lamar Tech
- Turned professional: 1962
- Former tour: LPGA Tour (1963–1983)
- Professional wins: 12

Number of wins by tour
- LPGA Tour: 11
- Other: 1

Best results in LPGA major championships
- Western Open: T4: 1964
- Titleholders C'ship: T5: 1965
- Chevron Championship: DNP
- Women's PGA C'ship: 2nd: 1965
- U.S. Women's Open: 4th: 1963, 1966
- du Maurier Classic: T55: 1982

Achievements and awards
- LPGA Rookie of the Year: 1963

Clifford Ann Creed (born September 23, 1938) is an American former professional golfer. She became a member of the LPGA Tour in 1963 and won eleven LPGA Tour events in all.

== Amateur career ==
In 1938, Creed was born in Alexandria, Louisiana. She started playing golf at the age of 11. She graduated from Lamar Tech in 1960 with a degree in physical education.

She won the Louisiana State Women's Amateur six times between 1955 and 1961, and won the Western Junior in 1956. In 1962, she won the North and South Women's Amateur, the South Atlantic Amateur and was a member of the United States Curtis Cup team. She is a former Louisiana Sports Athlete of the Year.

== Professional career ==
In 1962, Creed turned professional. She joined the LPGA Tour in 1963 and earned LPGA Rookie of the Year honors. She won 11 times on tour between 1964 and 1967. Her best finish in a major championship was second in the 1965 LPGA Championship. She finished in the top ten on the money list six times between 1963 and 1968, with her best finish being fourth place in 1965.

== Awards and honors ==
- In 1985, Creed was elected to Louisiana Sports Hall of Fame.
- In 1990, she was inducted into Lamar's Cardinal Hall of Honor.

== Amateur wins ==
- 1955 Louisiana Women's Amateur
- 1956 Western Junior, Louisiana Women's Amateur
- 1957 Louisiana Women's Amateur
- 1958 Louisiana Women's Amateur
- 1960 Louisiana Women's Amateur
- 1961 Louisiana Women's Amateur
- 1962 North and South Women's Amateur, South Atlantic Amateur

== Professional wins (12) ==
=== LPGA Tour wins (11) ===
| No. | Date | Tournament | Winning score | Margin of victory | Runner(s)-up |
|---|---|---|---|---|---|
| 1 | Jun 14, 1964 | Lady Carling Open | +7 (75-70-72=217) | 1 stroke | (United States) Carol Mann (United States) Betsy Rawls |
| 2 | Jul 26, 1964 | Cosmopolitan Women's Open | −5 (69-71-71=211) | 2 strokes | (United States) Mary Mills |
| 3 | Aug 30, 1964 | Riverside Ladies Open | −2 (72-72-74-68=286) | 3 strokes | (United States) Shirley Englehorn |
| 4 | Aug 22, 1965 | Omaha Jaycee Open | −2 (67-71-70=208) | 2 strokes | (United States) Jo Ann Prentice |
| 5 | Sep 19, 1965 | Visalia Open | +1 (74-68-74-73=289) | 1 stroke | (United States) Susie Berning |
| 6 | Oct 30, 1965 | Las Cruces Open | −1 (69-70-76=215) | 2 strokes | (United States) Donna Caponi |
| 7 | May 15, 1966 | Dallas Civitan Invitational | +1 (72-70-69-74=285) | 6 strokes | (United States) Judy Rankin |
| 8 | Jul 17, 1966 | Lady Carling Open | +5 (72-76-73=221) | Playoff | (United States) Susie Berning |
| 9 | Nov 20, 1966 | The Success Open | −9 (67-70-70=207) | 3 strokes | (United States) Susie Berning (United States) Sandra Haynie |
| 10 | Sep 10, 1967 | Pacific Golf Classic | −5 (69-68-74=211) | 6 strokes | (United States) Ruth Jessen |
| 11 | Nov 5, 1967 | Corpus Christi Civitan Open | +4 (70-72-72=214) | 4 strokes | (Australia) Margie Masters (United States) Kathy Whitworth |

LPGA Tour playoff record (1–3)

| No. | Year | Tournament | Opponent(s) | Result |
|---|---|---|---|---|
| 1 | 1965 | Babe Zaharias Open | (United States) Marlene Hagge (United States) Carol Mann | Hagge won with birdie on third extra hole Mann eliminated by par on second hole |
| 2 | 1966 | Lady Carling Open | (United States) Susie Berning | Won with birdie on first extra hole |
| 3 | 1973 | Birmingham Classic | (United States) Betty Burfeindt (United States) Gloria Ehret | Ehret won with birdie on first extra hole |
| 4 | 1976 | Portland Classic | (United States) Donna Caponi | Lost to birdie on second extra hole |

=== Other wins (1) ===
- 1967 Yankee Ladies' Team Championship (with Margie Masters)

== Team appearances ==
Amateur

- Curtis Cup (representing the United States): 1962 (winners)

== See also ==
- List of golfers with most LPGA Tour wins
