= Tippecanoe Open =

Golf tournament formerly on the LPGA Tour

The Tippecanoe Open was a golf tournament on the LPGA Tour from 1959 to 1961. It was played at the Tippecanoe Lake Country Club in Leesburg, Indiana. It was an unofficial event in 1959 and 1960.

== Winners ==
Tippecanoe Open

- 1961 Kathy Cornelius

Leesburg Pro-Am

- 1960 Barbara Romack

Hoosier Celebrity

- 1959 Mickey Wright
