= Sandra Haynie =

American professional golfer

Personal information
- Full name: Sandra Jane Haynie
- Nationality: United States
- Born: June 4, 1943 (age 83) Fort Worth, Texas, U.S.
- Height: 5 ft 6 in (1.68 m)

Career
- Sport: Golf
- Turned professional: 1961
- Former tour: LPGA Tour (1961–89)
- Professional wins: 44

Number of wins by tour
- LPGA Tour: 42
- LPGA of Japan Tour: 1
- Other: 1

Best results in LPGA major championships (wins: 4)
- Western Open: 2nd: 1967
- Titleholders C'ship: T5: 1965
- Chevron Championship: T15: 1983
- Women's PGA C'ship: Won: 1965, 1974
- U.S. Women's Open: Won: 1974
- du Maurier Classic: Won: 1982

Achievements and awards
- World Golf Hall of Fame: 1977 (member page)
- LPGA Player of the Year: 1970

Sandra Jane Haynie (born June 4, 1943) is an American former professional golfer on the LPGA Tour starting in 1961. She won four major championships, 42 LPGA Tour career events, and is a member of the World Golf Hall of Fame.

== Amateur career ==
Haynie was born in Fort Worth, Texas. She won the 1957-58 Texas State Publinx and the 1958-59 Texas Amateur. She also captured the 1960 Trans-Mississippi title.

== Professional career ==
Haynie joined the LPGA Tour in 1961 at the age of 18 and she won her first professional title in 1962 at age 19 at the Austin Civitan Open. She won a total of 42 events on the LPGA Tour, including four major championships. She finished in the top-10 on the money list every year from 1963 to 1975. The 14th and last time for this distinction was in 1982 when she placed second in earnings for the fifth time. She was awarded LPGA Player of the Year honors in 1970. She was inducted into the World Golf Hall of Fame in 1977. Her last full season on the tour was 1989.

== Professional wins ==
=== LPGA Tour wins (42) ===
Legend
LPGA Tour major championships (4)
Other LPGA Tour (38)

No.	Date	Tournament	Winning score	Margin of victory	Runner(s)-up
1	Jun 10, 1962	Austin Civitan Open	−7 (69-73-72-75=289)	1 stroke	(United States) Mickey Wright
2	Jun 17, 1962	Cosmopolitan Open	−6 (66-72-72=210)	2 strokes	(United States) Ruth Jessen
3	Oct 27, 1963	Phoenix Thunderbirds Ladies Open	−2 (68-71-76-71=286)	4 strokes	(United States) Kathy Whitworth
4	Aug 24, 1964	Baton Rouge Ladies' Open Invitational	−5 (70-68-73=211)	5 strokes	(United States) Kathy Whitworth
5	Nov 1, 1964	Las Cruces Ladies' Open	−8 (71-68-69=208)	2 strokes	(United States) Betsy Rawls
6	Jun 20, 1965	Cosmopolitan Open	−6 (70-70-70=210)	Playoff	(United States) Marlene Hagge (United States) Kathy Whitworth
7	Sep 26, 1965	LPGA Championship	−5 (70-68-69-72=279)	1 stroke	(United States) Clifford Ann Creed
8	Jul 10, 1966	Buckeye Savings Invitational	−11 (69-67-69=205)	5 strokes	(United States) Susie Berning
9	Aug 28, 1966	Glass City Classic	E (72-71-70=213)	Playoff	(United States) Gloria Ehret
10	Nov 13, 1966	Alamo Ladies' Open	−3 (72-71-70=213)	Playoff	(United States) Shirley Englehorn
11	Dec 4, 1966	Pensacola Ladies Invitational	−7 (72-74-72=218)	Playoff	(United States) Kathy Whitworth
12	Aug 27, 1967	Amarillo Ladies' Open	−1 (71-74-67=212)	2 strokes	(United States) Kathy Whitworth
13	Sep 24, 1967	Mickey Wright Invitational	−1 (72-70-70=212)	Playoff	(United States) Kathy Whitworth
14	Sep 8, 1968	Pacific Ladies Classic	−3 (71-68-74=213)	3 strokes	(United States) Kathy Cornelius (United States) Sandra Palmer
15	May 4, 1969	Shreveport Kiwanis Club Invitational	−2 (70-73-71=214)	2 strokes	(United States) Sandra Palmer, (United States) Mickey Wright
16	May 18, 1969	St. Louis Women's Invitational	−5 (67-69-72=208)	Playoff	(United States) Kathy Whitworth (United States) Peggy Wilson
17	Jul 13, 1969	Ladies' Supertest Open	−3 (70-76-70=216)	5 strokes	(United States) Marilynn Smith (United States) Kathy Whitworth
18	Apr 19, 1970	Raleigh Ladies Invitational	−4 (69-71-72=212)	3 strokes	(United States) Carol Mann (United States) Jo Ann Prentice (United States) Marilynn Smith
19	May 4, 1970	Shreveport Kiwanis Invitational	−2 (73-69-72=214)	1 stroke	(United States) Betsy Rawls (United States) Mickey Wright
20	Apr 25, 1971	Burdine's Invitational	−3 (74-71-74=219)	3 strokes	(United States) Cynthia Sullivan
21	May 2, 1971	Dallas Civitan Open	−12 (68-65-68=201)	4 strokes	(United States) Jane Blalock
22	May 9, 1971	San Antonio Alamo Open	−13 (69-66-71=206)	6 strokes	(United States) Kathy Whitworth
23	Aug 15, 1971	Len Immke Buick Open	−10 (70-69-67=206)	1 stroke	(United States) Marlene Hagge
24	Aug 27, 1972	National Jewish Hospital Open	−6 (69-70-68=207)	2 strokes	(United States) Jane Blalock
25	Sep 17, 1972	Quality First Classic	−10 (69-69-68=206)	4 strokes	(United States) Marlene Hagge
26	Sep 24, 1972	Lincoln-Mercury Open	−4 (73-71-71=215)	1 stroke	(United States) Sharon Miller
27	Mar 18, 1973	Orange Blossom Classic	E (72-75-69=216)	1 stroke	(United States) Marlene Hagge
28	Sep 2, 1973	Charity Golf Classic	−8 (71-68-69=208)	5 strokes	(United States) Murle Breer (United States) Carole Jo Kabler (United States) Judy Rankin (United States) Kathy Whitworth
29	Oct 7, 1973	Lincoln-Mercury Open	−7 (67-72-73-212)	3 strokes	(United States) Donna Caponi (United States) JoAnne Carner
30	Jun 16, 1974	Lawson's LPGA Open	−1 (72-74-69=215)	Playoff	(United States) Gloria Ehret
31	Jun 23, 1974	LPGA Championship	−4 (69-73-73-73=288)	2 strokes	(United States) JoAnne Carner
32	Jul 21, 1974	U.S. Women's Open	+7 (73-73-74-75=295)	1 stroke	(United States) Carol Mann (United States) Beth Stone
33	Aug 4, 1974	George Washington Classic	−6 (71-69-73=213)	5 strokes	(United States) Kathy Ahern (United States) JoAnne Carner (United States) Kathy Whitworth
34	Aug 25, 1974	National Jewish Hospital Open	−6 (71-71-71=213)	1 stroke	(United States) JoAnne Carner (United States) Joyce Kazmierski
35	Sep 15, 1974	Charity Golf Classic	−5 (70-72-66=208)	3 strokes	(United States) Jane Blalock
36	Feb 9, 1975	Naples Lely Classic	−5 (71-72-68=211)	1 stroke	(United States) Donna Caponi (United States) Marilynn Smith
37	Apr 27, 1975	Charity Golf Classic	−1 (69-73-70=212)	Playoff	(United States) Amy Alcott (United States) Judy Rankin
38	Nov 16, 1975	Jacksonville Ladies Open	+7 (75-71-77=223)	1 stroke	(Canada) Sandra Post
39	Nov 23, 1975	Greater Ft. Myers Classic	−6 (66-71-73=210)	Playoff	(United States) Pat Bradley
40	Sep 20, 1981	Henredon Classic	−7 (74-71-68-68=281)	1 stroke	(United States) Judy Dickinson
41	Jun 27, 1982	Rochester International	−12 (72-68-69-67=276)	6 strokes	(United States) Nancy Lopez (United States) Hollis Stacy
42	Jul 4, 1982	Peter Jackson Classic	−8 (71-71-70-68=280)	1 stroke	(United States) Beth Daniel

LPGA Tour playoff record (9–7)

No.	Year	Tournament	Opponent(s)	Result
1	1965	Cosmopolitan Open	(United States) Marlene Hagge (United States) Kathy Whitworth	Won with birdie on first extra hole
2	1966	Glass City Classic	(United States) Gloria Ehret	Won with birdie on third extra hole
3	1966	Alamo Ladies' Open	(United States) Shirley Englehorn	Won with birdie on third extra hole
4	1966	Pensacola Ladies Invitational	(United States) Kathy Whitworth	Won with par on first extra hole
5	1967	Louise Suggs Invitational	(United States) Susie Berning	Lost to birdie on second extra hole
6	1967	Mickey Wright Invitational	(United States) Kathy Whitworth	Won with birdie on first extra hole
7	1969	St. Louis Women's Invitational	(United States) Kathy Whitworth (United States) Peggy Wilson	Won with par on third extra hole Whitworth eliminated by birdie on first hole
8	1970	Burdine's Invitational	(United States) Carol Mann	Lost to par on first extra hole
9	1970	Len Immke Buick Open	(United States) Althea Gibson (United States) Mary Mills	Mills won with par on second extra hole Haynie eliminated by birdie on first hole
10	1970	Women's Golf Charities Open	(United States) Judy Rankin (United States) Marilynn Smith	Smith won with birdie on first extra hole
11	1973	La Canadienne	(Canada) Jocelyne Bourassa (United States) Judy Rankin	Bourassa won with par on third extra hole Rankin eliminated by par on second hole
12	1974	Colgate-Dinah Shore Winner's Circle	(United States) Jane Blalock (United States) Jo Ann Prentice	Prentice won with birdie on fourth extra hole Haynie eliminated by par on second hole
13	1974	Lawson's LPGA Open	(United States) Gloria Ehret	Won with par on fourth extra hole
14	1975	Charity Golf Classic	(United States) Amy Alcott (United States) Judy Rankin	Won with par on fourth extra hole Rankin eliminated by par on first hole
15	1975	Greater Ft. Myers Classic	(United States) Pat Bradley	Won with par on second extra hole
16	1982	Henredon Classic	(United States) JoAnne Carner	Lost to par on fifth extra hole

=== LPGA of Japan Tour wins (1) ===
- 1975 Sun Star Ladies

=== Other wins (1) ===
- 1982 Portland Ping Team Championship (with Kathy McMullen)

== Major championships ==
=== Wins (4) ===
Year	Championship	Winning score	Margin	Runner(s)-up
1965	LPGA Championship	−5 (70-68-69-72=279)	1 stroke	(United States) Clifford Ann Creed
1974	LPGA Championship	−4 (69-73-73-73=288)	2 strokes	(United States) JoAnne Carner
1974	U.S. Women's Open	+7 (73-73-74-75=295)	1 stroke	(United States) Carol Mann, (United States) Beth Stone
1982	Peter Jackson Classic	−8 (71-71-70-68=280)	1 stroke	(United States) Beth Daniel

== Team appearances ==
Professional

- Handa Cup (representing the United States): 2006 (winners), 2007 (winners), 2008 (winners), 2009 (winners)

== See also ==
- List of golfers with most LPGA Tour wins
- List of golfers with most LPGA major championship wins
