= Waldemar Open =

Golf tournament formerly on the LPGA Tour

The Waldemar Open was a golf tournament on the LPGA Tour from 1963 to 1964. It was played at the Tam O'Shanter Club in Brookville, New York.

== Winners ==
Waldemar Open

- 1964 Mickey Wright

Carvel Ladies Open

- 1963 Kathy Whitworth
