= Yankee Women's Open =

Golf tournament formerly on the LPGA Tour

The Yankee Women's Open was a golf tournament on the LPGA Tour from 1964 to 1967. It was played in Grand Blanc, Michigan at the Atlas Valley Country Club from 1964 to 1966 and at the Willowood Country Club in 1967. It was an unofficial team (best-ball) event in 1966 and 1967.

== Winners ==
Yankee Ladies' Team Championship

- 1967 Clifford Ann Creed and Margie Masters

Yankee Women's Open

- 1966 Gloria Ehret and Judy Kimball

Yankee Open

- 1965 Kathy Whitworth

Yankee Women's Open

- 1964 Ruth Jessen
