= Las Cruces Ladies Open =

Golf tournament formerly on the LPGA Tour

The Las Cruces Ladies Open was a golf tournament on the LPGA Tour from 1964 to 1966. It was played at the Las Cruces Country Club in Las Cruces, New Mexico.

== Winners ==
Las Cruces Ladies Open

- 1966 Kathy Whitworth

Las Cruces Open

- 1965 Clifford Ann Creed

Las Cruces Ladies' Open

- 1964 Sandra Haynie
