= Hillside Open =

Golf tournament formerly on the LPGA Tour

The Hillside Open was a golf tournament on the LPGA Tour from 1963 to 1964. It was played at the Montecito Country Club in Santa Barbara, California.

== Winners ==
Hillside House Ladies' Open

- 1964 Ruth Jessen

Hillside Open

- 1963 Kathy Whitworth
