= Sea Island Open =

Golf tournament formerly on the LPGA Tour

The Sea Island Open was a golf tournament on the LPGA Tour from 1954 to 1963. It was played in Sea Island, Georgia at the Sea Island Golf Club from 1954 to 1957 and 1963 and at the Cloister Country Club from 1958 to 1962.

== Winners ==
Sea Island Women's Invitational

- 1963 Mickey Wright
- 1962 Mickey Wright

Sea Island Open

- 1961 Louise Suggs
- 1960 Mickey Wright
- 1959 No tournament
- 1958 Mickey Wright
- 1957 Mickey Wright
- 1956 Marlene Hagge
- 1955 Jackie Pung
- 1954 Louise Suggs
