= Tall City Open =

Golf tournament formerly on the LPGA Tour

The Tall City Open was a golf tournament on the LPGA Tour from 1964 to 1968. It was played in Midland, Texas at the Hogan Park Golf Club, except in 1967 when it was played at the Midland Country Club.

At the inaugural Tall City Open, Wright shot a 62 in the third and final round. It was the lowest score in LPGA Tour history at that time. Wright's 1964 Tall City Open win is also tied for the largest final round comeback in LPGA history.

== Winners ==
Tall City Open

- 1968 Mickey Wright
- 1967 Carol Mann
- 1966 Kathy Whitworth

LPGA Tall City Open

- 1965 Marlene Hagge

Tall City Open

- 1964 Mickey Wright
