= Mary Mills Mississippi Gulf Coast Invitational =

Golf tournament formerly on the LPGA Tour

The Mary Mills Mississippi Gulf Coast Invitational was a golf tournament on the LPGA Tour from 1963 to 1964. It was played on the Mississippi Gulf Coast at the Gulf Hills Dude Ranch & Country Club in Ocean Springs, Mississippi in 1963 and at the Broadwater Beach Hotel & Golf Club in Biloxi, Mississippi in 1964. Mississippi native, Mary Mills, served as tournament host.

== Winners ==
- 1964 Mickey Wright
- 1963 Kathy Whitworth
