= Carlsbad Jaycee Open =

Golf tournament formerly on the LPGA Tour

The Carlsbad Jaycee Open was a golf tournament on the LPGA Tour in 1962, 1963 and 1967. It was played at the Riverside Country Club in Carlsbad, New Mexico.

== Winners ==
Carlsbad Jaycee Open

- 1967 Murle Lindstrom

Cavern City Open

- 1964–1966 No tournament
- 1963 Marilynn Smith

Carlsbad Cavern Open

- 1962 Mickey Wright
