= Baton Rouge Ladies Invitational =

Golf tournament formerly on the LPGA Tour

The Baton Rouge Ladies Invitational was a golf tournament on the LPGA Tour from 1964 to 1966. It was played at the Sherwood Forest Country Club in Baton Rouge, Louisiana.

== Winners ==
Baton Rouge Ladies Invitational

- 1966 Carol Mann

Baton Rouge Invitational

- 1965 Mickey Wright

Baton Rouge Ladies' Open Invitational

- 1964 Sandra Haynie
