= Omaha Jaycee Open =

US golf tournament

The Omaha Jaycee Open was a golf tournament on the LPGA Tour from 1964 to 1965. It was played at the Miracle Hills Golf Club in Omaha, Nebraska, United States.

== Winners ==
Omaha Jaycee Open

- 1965 Clifford Ann Creed

Omaha Jaycee Open Invitational

- 1964 Ruth Jessen
