= Sacramento Open =

Golf tournament formerly on the LPGA Tour

The Sacramento Open was a golf tournament on the LPGA Tour, played intermittently from 1951 to 1962. It was played in Sacramento, California at three different courses: the Del Paso Country Club in 1951 and 1961, the Bing Maloney Golf Course in 1953, and at the Valley Hill Country Club in 1962.

== Winners ==
Sacramento Open

- 1962 Ruth Jessen

Sacramento Valley Open

- 1961 Mickey Wright

Barbara Romack Open

- 1953 Betsy Rawls

Sacramento Women's Invitational Open

- 1951 Betsy Rawls
