= Sunshine Women's Open =

Golf tournament formerly on the LPGA Tour

The Sunshine Women's Open was a golf tournament on the LPGA Tour from 1959 to 1963. It was played at the Miami Springs Country Club in Miami Springs, Florida from 1959 to 1962 and at the LeJeune Golf Club in Miami, Florida in 1963.

== Winners ==
Sunshine Women's Open

- 1963 Betsy Rawls

Sunshine Open

- 1962 Marilynn Smith

Miami Open

- 1961 Mickey Wright

MAGA Pro-Am

- 1960 No tournament
- 1959 Wiffi Smith
