= Shreveport Kiwanis Invitational =

Golf tournament formerly on the LPGA Tour

The Shreveport Kiwanis Invitational was a golf tournament on the LPGA Tour from 1963 to 1970. It was played at three different courses in Louisiana: Alexandria Golf and Country Club in Alexandria in 1963 and 1964, Palmetto Country Club in Benton from 1965 to 1969, and Huntington Park Golf Course in Shreveport in 1970.

== Winners ==
Shreveport Kiwanis Invitational

- 1970 Sandra Haynie

Shreveport Kiwanis Club Invitational

- 1969 Sandra Haynie
- 1968 Carol Mann
- 1967 Mickey Wright
- 1966 Mickey Wright

Shreveport Kiwanis Invitational

- 1965 Kathy Whitworth

Clifford Ann Creed Invitational

- 1964 Mickey Wright

Alpine Civitan Open

- 1963 Mickey Wright
