= Visalia Open =

Golf tournament formerly on the LPGA Tour

The Visalia Open was a golf tournament on the LPGA Tour from 1962 to 1965. It was played at the Visalia Country Club in Visalia, California.

== Winners ==
Visalia Open

- 1965 Clifford Ann Creed

Visalia Ladies' Open

- 1964 Mickey Wright
- 1963 Mickey Wright

Visalia Open

- 1962 Mary Lena Faulk
