= Milwaukee Jaycee Open =

Golf tournament formerly on the LPGA Tour

The Milwaukee Jaycee Open was a golf tournament on the LPGA Tour from 1962 to 1967. It was played at two different courses in the Milwaukee, Wisconsin area: Tuckaway Country Club Franklin in 1962 and 1966 and North Shore Country Club, then located in Bayside, Wisconsin in 1963–1965, and 1967. Both courses would later host the Greater Milwaukee Open on the PGA Tour.

== Winners ==
Milwaukee Jaycee Open

- 1967 Susie Maxwell
- 1966 Kathy Whitworth

Milwaukee Open

- 1965 Marlene Hagge

Milwaukee Jaycee Open

- 1964 Mickey Wright
- 1963 Kathy Whitworth

Milwaukee Open

- 1962 Mickey Wright
