= Muskogee Civitan Open =

Golf tournament formerly on the LPGA Tour

The Muskogee Civitan Open was a golf tournament on the LPGA Tour from 1962 to 1965. It was played at the Muskogee Country Club in Muskogee, Oklahoma.

== Winners ==
- 1965 Susie Maxwell
- 1964 Mickey Wright
- 1963 Mickey Wright
- 1962 Patty Berg
