= Riverside Ladies Open =

Golf tournament

The Riverside Ladies Open was a golf tournament on the LPGA Tour from 1962 to 1964. It was played at three different location in Utah: Willow Creek Country Club in Salt Lake City in 1962, Ogden Country Club in Ogden in 1963, and Riverside Country Club in Provo in 1964.

== Winners ==
Riverside Ladies Open

- 1964 Clifford Ann Creed

Ogden Ladies' Open

- 1963 Kathy Whitworth

Salt Lake City Open

- 1962 Mickey Wright
