= Albuquerque Swing Parade =

Golf tournament formerly on the LPGA Tour

The Albuquerque Swing Parade was a golf tournament on the LPGA Tour from 1961 to 1964. It was played in Albuquerque, New Mexico at the Four Hills Country Club in 1961 and 1962 and at the Paradise Hills Country Club in 1963 and 1964.

== Winners ==
Albuquerque Pro-Am

- 1964 Marilynn Smith

Albuquerque Swing Parade

- 1963 Mickey Wright
- 1962 Mickey Wright

Bill Brannin's Swing Parade

- 1961 Betsy Rawls
