= Jo Ann Prentice =

American professional golfer (1933–2025)

Personal information
- Nationality: United States
- Born: February 9, 1933 Birmingham, Alabama, U.S.
- Died: May 18, 2025 (aged 92)
- Height: 5 ft 5.5 in (1.66 m)

Career
- Sport: Golf
- Turned professional: 1956
- Former tour: LPGA Tour
- Professional wins: 6

Number of wins by tour
- LPGA Tour: 6

Best results in LPGA major championships
- Western Open: T2: 1966
- Titleholders C'ship: 4th: 1963
- Chevron Championship: 71st: 1983
- Women's PGA C'ship: T3: 1964
- U.S. Women's Open: T2: 1962
- du Maurier Classic: T44: 1979

Jo Ann Prentice (February 9, 1933 – May 18, 2025) was an American professional golfer who played on the LPGA Tour.

== Biography ==
Prentice was born in Birmingham, Alabama on February 9, 1933. She turned professional in 1956.

Prentice joined the LPGA tour in 1957 and won six times between 1965 and 1974.

Prentice was elected to the Alabama Sports Hall of Fame in 1991, and is one of only eight golfers in it.

Prentice died May 18, 2025, at the age of 92.

== Amateur wins ==
this list is incomplete

- 1954 Alabama Women's Amateur

== Professional wins ==
=== LPGA Tour wins (6) ===
No.	Date	Tournament	Winning score	Margin of victory	Runner(s)-up
1	Mar 28, 1965	All State Ladies' Invitational	+2 (74-72=146)	1 stroke	(United States) Kathy Whitworth
2	May 15, 1967	Dallas Civitan Open	−3 (67-71-68-75=281)	1 stroke	(United States) Judy Kimball
3	Oct 30, 1972	Corpus Christi Civitan Open	E (69-69-72=210)	Playoff	(United States) Sandra Palmer (United States) Kathy Whitworth
4	Jan 7, 1973	Burdine's Invitational	−4 (69-71-72=212)	1 stroke	(United States) Beth Stone
5	Apr 21, 1974	Colgate-Dinah Shore Winner's Circle	+1 (71-71-74-73=289)	Playoff	(United States) Jane Blalock (United States) Sandra Haynie
6	May 12, 1974	American Defender-Raleigh Classic	−7 (65-72=137)	2 strokes	(United States) Laura Baugh

Note: Prentice won the Colgate-Dinah Shore Winner's Circle (now known as the Chevron Championship) before it became a major championship.

LPGA Tour playoff record (2–1)

No.	Year	Tournament	Opponent(s)	Result
1	1972	Corpus Christi Civitan Open	(United States) Sandra Palmer (United States) Kathy Whitworth	Won with birdie on tenth extra hole Whitworth eliminated by birdie on third hole
2	1974	Colgate-Dinah Shore Winner's Circle	(United States) Jane Blalock (United States) Sandra Haynie	Won with birdie on fourth extra hole Haynie eliminated by par on second hole
3	1974	Lady Errol Classic	(United States) Jane Blalock	Lost to birdie on first extra hole
