= Phoenix Thunderbirds Open =

LPGA tournament (1962 to 1965)

The Phoenix Thunderbirds Open was a golf tournament on the LPGA Tour from 1962 to 1965. It was played at two different courses in the Phoenix, Arizona area: Paradise Valley Country Club in 1962, Arizona Biltmore Country Club in 1963 to 1965.

== Winners ==
Phoenix Thunderbirds Open

- 1965 Marlene Hagge

Phoenix Thunderbirds Ladies' Open

- 1964 Ruth Jessen

Phoenix Thunderbirds Ladies Open

- 1963 Sandra Haynie

Phoenix Thunderbird Open

- 1962 Kathy Whitworth
