= Pacific Ladies Classic =

Golf tournament formerly on the LPGA Tour

The Pacific Ladies Classic was a golf tournament on the LPGA Tour from 1962 to 1968. It was played in Eugene, Oregon at the Eugene Country Club every year except 1967 when it was played at the Shadow Hills Country Club.

== Winners ==
Pacific Ladies Classic

- 1968 Sandra Haynie

Pacific Golf Classic

- 1967 Clifford Ann Creed

Pacific Ladies' Classic

- 1966 Mickey Wright

Eugene Open

- 1965 Mary Mills

Eugene Ladies' Open

- 1964 Mary Mills
- 1963 Marilynn Smith

Eugene Open

- 1962 Shirley Englehorn
