= Waterloo Women's Open Invitational =

Golf tournament

The Waterloo Women's Open Invitational was a golf tournament on the LPGA Tour from 1958 to 1966. It was played at the Sunnyside Country Club in Waterloo, Iowa.

== Winners ==
- 1966 Carol Mann
- 1965 Betsy Rawls
- 1964 Shirley Englehorn
- 1963 Mickey Wright
- 1962 Marilynn Smith
- 1961 Mickey Wright
- 1960 Wiffi Smith
- 1959 Betsy Rawls
- 1958 Fay Crocker

== See also ==
- Waterloo Open - a men's event
