= Babe Zaharias Open =

Golf tournament formerly on the LPGA Tour

The Babe Zaharias Open was a golf tournament on the LPGA Tour from 1953 to 1967. It was played in Beaumont, Texas at the Beaumont Country Club from 1953 to 1964 and at the Bayou Din Golf Club from 1965 to 1967. Babe Zaharias, LPGA co-founder and Beaumont resident, hosted the tournament until her death in 1956. She won the first edition of the event.

== Winners ==
- 1967 Marilynn Smith
- 1966 Shirley Englehorn
- 1965 Marlene Hagge
- 1964 Ruth Jessen
- 1963 Mickey Wright
- 1962 Kathy Cornelius and Betsy Rawls (tie, unofficial)
- 1961 Mary Lena Faulk
- 1960 Betsy Rawls
- 1959 Betsy Rawls
- 1958 Louise Suggs
- 1957 Marlene Hagge
- 1956 Marlene Hagge
- 1955 Betty Jameson
- 1954 Louise Suggs
- 1953 Babe Zaharias

== See also ==
- Babe Zaharias Invitational - an unrelated LPGA Tour event played in Ohio in 1976
