= Mary Kay Classic =

Golf tournament formerly on the LPGA Tour

The Mary Kay Classic was a golf tournament on the LPGA Tour from 1956 to 1982. It was played at four different courses in the Dallas, Texas area.

== Tournament locations ==
Years	Venue	Location
1956–1971	Glen Lakes Country Club	Dallas, Texas
1972–1977	Brookhaven Country Club	Dallas, Texas
1978	The Trophy Club	Roanoke, Texas
1979–1982	Bent Tree Country Club	Dallas, Texas

== Winners ==
Mary Kay Classic

- 1982 Sandra Spuzich
- 1981 Jan Stephenson
- 1980 Jerilyn Britz
- 1979 Nancy Lopez

Civitan Open

- 1978 Silvia Bertolaccini

Dallas Civitan Open

- 1977 Vivian Brownlee
- 1976 Jane Blalock
- 1975 Carol Mann
- 1974 JoAnne Carner
- 1973 Kathy Whitworth
- 1972 Jane Blalock
- 1971 Sandra Haynie
- 1970 Betsy Rawls
- 1969 Carol Mann
- 1968 Kathy Whitworth
- 1967 Jo Ann Prentice
- 1966 Clifford Ann Creed
- 1965 Mickey Wright
- 1964 Betsy Rawls
- 1963 Mickey Wright
- 1962 Ruth Jessen
- 1961 Louise Suggs
- 1960 Louise Suggs
- 1959 Louise Suggs

Dallas Open

- 1958 Mickey Wright
- 1957 Wiffi Smith
- 1956 Patty Berg
