= St. Petersburg Women's Open =

LPGA golf tournament (1954–1989)

The St. Petersburg Women's Open was a golf tournament on the LPGA Tour from 1954 to 1989. It was played at three different courses in the St. Petersburg, Florida area.

LPGA Hall of Fame member Kathy Whitworth won the tournament five times (1965, 1968–70, and 1974). Only three other players have won the same LPGA tournament on five occasions.

== Tournament locations ==
Years	Venue	Location
1954–1970, 1972	Sunset Golf and Country Club	St. Petersburg, Florida
1971, 1975, 1977–1989	Pasadena Golf Club	Gulfport, Florida
1973–1974, 1976	Seminole Lakes Country Club	Seminole, Florida

== Winners ==
USX Golf Classic

- 1989 Betsy King
- 1988 Rosie Jones

S&H Golf Classic

- 1987 Cindy Hill
- 1986 Pat Bradley
- 1985 Alice Miller
- 1984 Vicki Fergon
- 1983 Hollis Stacy
- 1982 Hollis Stacy
- 1981 JoAnne Carner
- 1980 Dot Germain

Orange Blossom Classic

- 1979 Jane Blalock
- 1978 Jane Blalock
- 1977 Judy Rankin
- 1976 JoAnne Carner
- 1975 Amy Alcott
- 1974 Kathy Whitworth
- 1973 Sandra Haynie
- 1972 Carol Mann
- 1971 Jan Ferraris
- 1970 Kathy Whitworth

Orange Blossom Open

- 1969 Kathy Whitworth

St. Petersburg Orange Blossom Open

- 1968 Kathy Whitworth

St. Petersburg Orange Classic

- 1967 Marilynn Smith

St. Petersburg Women's Open

- 1966 Marilynn Smith

St. Petersburg Open

- 1965 Kathy Whitworth

St. Petersburg Women's Open Invitational

- 1964 Mary Lena Faulk

St. Petersburg Women's Open

- 1963 Mickey Wright

St. Petersburg Open

- 1962 Louise Suggs
- 1961 Mickey Wright
- 1960 Beverly Hanson
- 1959 Louise Suggs
- 1958 Betsy Rawls
- 1957 Mary Lena Faulk
- 1956 Kathy Cornelius
- 1955 Patty Berg
- 1954 Beverly Hanson
