= Mickey Wright Invitational =

Golf tournament formerly on the LPGA Tour

The Mickey Wright Invitational was a golf tournament on the LPGA Tour from 1961 to 1969. It was played at several different courses in the San Diego, California area. Tournament host and San Diego native, Mickey Wright, won the first three editions of the event and four in all.

== Tournament locations ==
Years	Venue	Location
1961	Mission Valley Country Club	San Diego, California
1962	Stardust Country Club	San Diego, California
1963	La Jolla Country Club	La Jolla, California
1964-67	San Luis Rey Golf Club	Bonsall, California
1968	Fallbrook Country Club	Fallbrook, California
1969	Lake San Marcos Country Club	San Marcos, California

== Winners ==
- 1969 Carol Mann
- 1968 Betsy Rawls
- 1967 Sandra Haynie
- 1966 Mickey Wright
- 1965 Kathy Whitworth
- 1964 Marlene Hagge
- 1963 Mickey Wright
- 1962 Mickey Wright
- 1961 Mickey Wright
