= Cosmopolitan Open =

American women's golf tournament

The Cosmopolitan Open was a golf tournament on the LPGA Tour from 1958 to 1965. It was played at the Macktown Golf Course in Rockton, Illinois.

== Winners ==
Cosmopolitan Open

- 1965 Sandra Haynie

Cosmopolitan Women's Open

- 1964 Clifford Ann Creed
- 1963 Ruth Jessen

Cosmopolitan Open

- 1962 Sandra Haynie
- 1961 Betsy Rawls
- 1960 Betsy Rawls
- 1959 Kathy Cornelius

Macktown Open

- 1958 Mary Lena Faulk
