= Mary Lena Faulk =

American professional golfer (1926–1995)

Personal information
- Nationality: United States
- Born: April 15, 1926 Chipley, Florida, U.S.
- Died: August 3, 1995 (aged 69) Delray Beach, Florida, U.S.

Career
- Sport: Golf
- Turned professional: 1955
- Former tour: LPGA Tour
- Professional wins: 13

Number of wins by tour
- LPGA Tour: 10
- Other: 3

Best results in LPGA major championships (wins: 1)
- Western Open: Won: 1961
- Titleholders C'ship: 2nd: 1955
- Women's PGA C'ship: T2: 1963
- U.S. Women's Open: T2: 1955

Mary Lena Faulk (April 15, 1926 – August 3, 1995) was an American professional golfer.

== Early life and amateur career ==
In 1926, Faulk was born in Chipley, Florida. At the age of 14 she moved to Thomasville, Georgia with her family. She won three consecutive Georgia Women's Amateur Matchplay Championships from 1946 to 1948.

In 1953, Faulk won the U.S. Women's Amateur. In 1954, she lost in the semi-finals to Mickey Wright. She was also a member of the U.S. team that defeated Great Britain to win the 1954 Curtis Cup. Meanwhile in Georgia, she won the state's 1954 Medal Play Championship.

== Professional career ==
In 1955, Faulk turned professional. In her rookie year on the LPGA Tour finished second at the U.S. Women's Open. She retired from the pro tour in 1965 having won 10 tournaments including the Women's Western Open which was then one of the women's major golf championships.

Faulk taught golf for many years at clubs in Georgia and Colorado Springs, Colorado. For some time she operated a women's apparel store in Southern Pines, North Carolina with fellow golfer Peggy Kirk Bell.

== Personal life ==
In 1995, Faulk died. She lived in Delray Beach, Florida during her later years.

== Awards and honors ==
In 1993, Faulk was inducted into the Georgia Golf Hall of Fame.

== Professional wins (13) ==
=== LPGA Tour wins (10) ===
- 1956 (1) Kansas City Open
- 1957 (1) St. Petersburg Open
- 1958 (1) Macktown Open
- 1961 (4) Babe Zaharias Open, Women's Western Open, Triangle Round Robin, Eastern Open
- 1962 (2) Peach Blossom Open, Visalia Open
- 1964 (1) St. Petersburg Women's Open Invitational

=== Other wins (3) ===
- 1951 Hardscrabble Open
- 1955 Virginia Hot Springs 4-Ball (with Betty Jameson)
- 1958 Homestead 4-Ball (with Betty Jameson)

== Major championships ==
=== Wins (1) ===
Year	Championship	Winning score	Margin	Runner-up
1961	Women's Western Open	−10 (75-75-67-73=290)	6 strokes	(United States) Betsy Rawls

== Team appearances ==
Amateur

- Curtis Cup (representing the United States): 1954 (winners)

== See also ==
- List of golfers with most LPGA Tour wins
