= Mickey Wright =

American professional golfer (1935–2020)

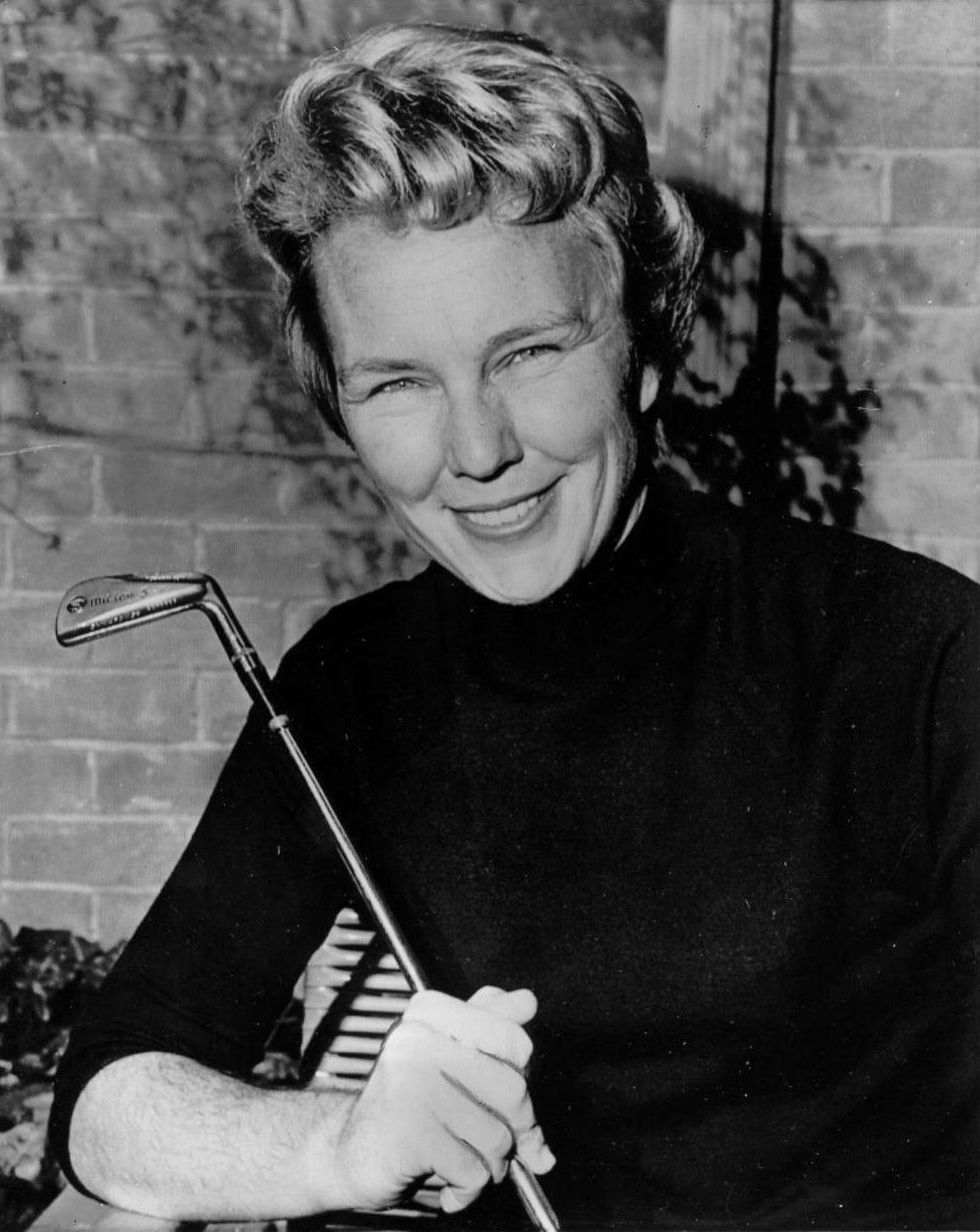
- Wright in 1965

Personal information
- Full name: Mary Kathryn Wright
- Nickname: Mickey
- Nationality: United States
- Born: February 14, 1935 San Diego, California, U.S.
- Died: February 17, 2020 (aged 85) Florida, U.S.
- Height: 5 ft 9 in (1.75 m)

Career
- Sport: Golf
- College: Stanford University (one year)
- Turned professional: 1954
- Former tour: LPGA Tour (joined 1955)
- Professional wins: 90

Number of wins by tour
- LPGA Tour: 82 (2nd all time)
- Other: 8

Best results in LPGA major championships (wins: 13)
- Western Open: Won: 1962, 1963, 1966
- Titleholders C'ship: Won: 1961, 1962
- Chevron Championship: T66: 1984
- Women's PGA C'ship: Won: 1958, 1960, 1961, 1963
- U.S. Women's Open: Won: 1958, 1959, 1961, 1964

Achievements and awards
- World Golf Hall of Fame: 1976 (member page)
- LPGA Tour Money Winner: 1961, 1962, 1963, 1964
- LPGA Vare Trophy: 1960, 1961, 1962, 1963, 1964
- Associated Press Female Athlete of the Year: 1963, 1964
- Bob Jones Award: 2010
- PGA of America Hall of Fame: 2017

Mary Kathryn "Mickey" Wright (February 14, 1935 – February 17, 2020) was an American professional golfer who played on the LPGA Tour. She became a member of the tour in 1955 and won 82 LPGA Tour career events including 13 major championships. She is a member of the World Golf Hall of Fame.

== Early life and amateur career ==
Wright was born on February 14, 1935, in San Diego, California, where she attended Herbert Hoover High School. Her first important title was the 1952 U.S. Girls' Junior. She attended Stanford University and played for its golf team, but left before graduation. She lost in the final of the 1954 U.S. Women's Amateur, won the 1954 World Amateur Championship, and turned professional later in 1954.

== Professional career ==
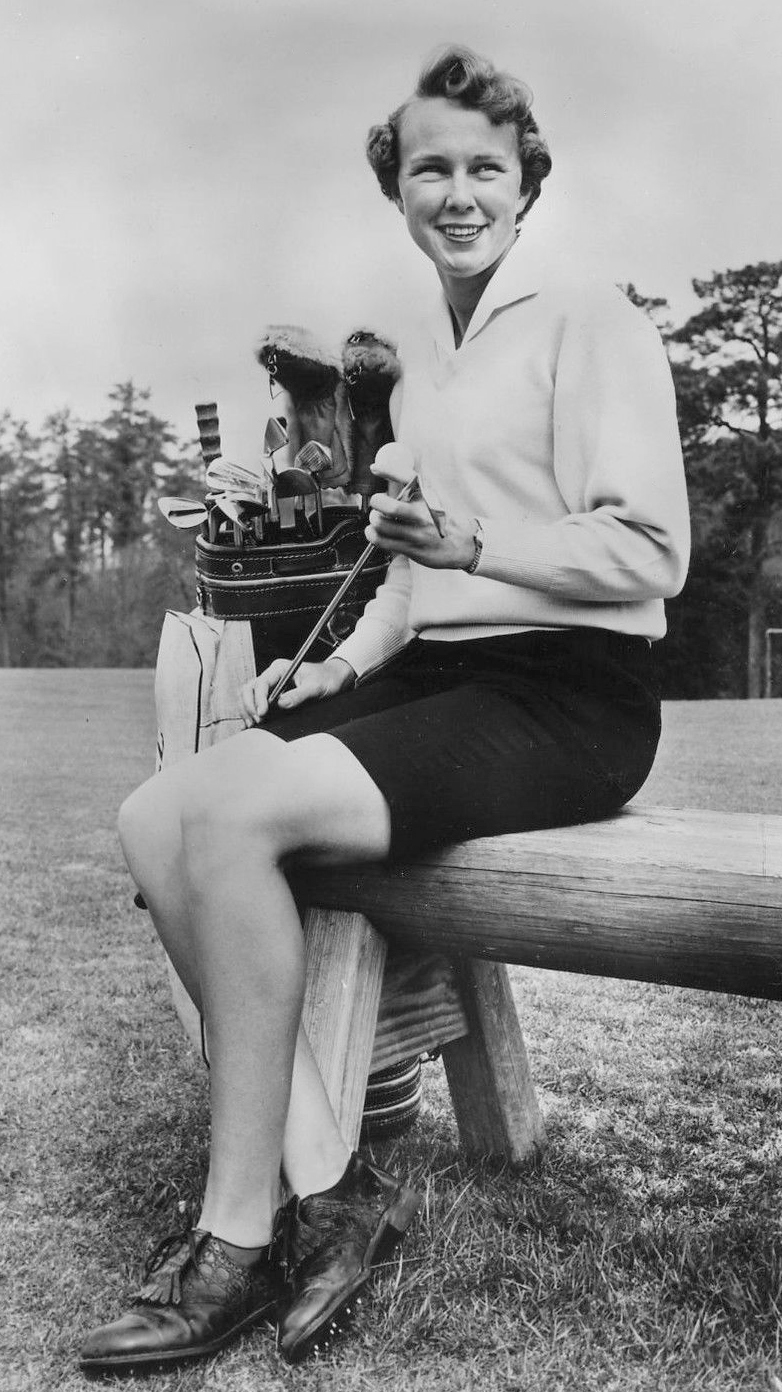
Wright in 1960

Wright joined the LPGA Tour in 1955. She won 82 events on the LPGA Tour, which puts her second on the all-time win list behind Kathy Whitworth, who won 88 times. Thirteen of her victories were in major championships, which places her second to Patty Berg, who won fifteen majors. Wright topped the LPGA money list for four consecutive seasons from 1961 to 1964 and made the top ten on the list thirteen times in total between 1956 and 1969. Wright won at least one LPGA title for 14 straight seasons, from 1956 to 1969.

At the inaugural Tall City Open in 1964, Wright shot a 62 in the third and final round. It was the lowest score in LPGA Tour history at that time, at a course (Hogan Park in Midland, Texas) on which the men's record, at the time, was 66. Wright's Tall City Open win is also tied for the largest final round comeback (10 shots) in LPGA history. Wright was coached by Harry Pressler. Ben Hogan said her swing was the best he had ever seen.

Wright retired from full-time golf at age 34 in 1969, because of problems with her feet, but did compete occasionally after that. She won 13 majors between 1958 and 1966, and she is the only player in LPGA Tour history to hold all four major titles at the same time. She lived in Port St. Lucie, Florida, and played recreational golf occasionally. She was a breast cancer survivor.

== Death and legacy ==
Wright died on February 17, 2020, from a heart attack at the age of 85. At the time, she had been hospitalized following a fall a few weeks prior.

In 2000, Wright was ranked as the ninth greatest golfer of all time, and the top woman golfer, by Golf Digest magazine. In a major 2009 survey of experts, published by Golf Magazine, she was chosen as the eighth best player of all time, and the top woman player of all time. She was inducted into the PGA of America Hall of Fame in 2017.

== Amateur wins ==
- 1952 U.S. Girls' Junior
- 1954 World Amateur Championship

== Professional wins (90) ==
=== LPGA Tour (82) ===
- 1956 (1) Jacksonville Open
- 1957 (3) Sea Island Open, Jacksonville Open, Wolverine Open
- 1958 (5) Sea Island Open, **LPGA Championship**, **U.S. Women's Open**, Opie Turner Open, Dallas Open
- 1959 (4) Jacksonville Open, Cavalier Open, **U.S. Women's Open**, Alliance Machine International Open
- 1960 (6) Sea Island Open, Tampa Open, **LPGA Championship**, Grossinger Open, Eastern Open, Memphis Open
- 1961 (10) St. Petersburg Open, Miami Open, **Titleholders Championship**, Columbus Open, **U.S. Women's Open**, Waterloo Open, Spokane Women's Open, Sacramento Valley Open, Mickey Wright Invitational, **LPGA Championship**
- 1962 (10) Sea Island Women's Invitational, **Titleholders Championship**, **Women's Western Open**, Milwaukee Open, Heart of America Invitational, Albuquerque Swing Parade, Salt Lake City Open, Spokane Open, Mickey Wright Invitational, Carlsbad Cavern Open
- 1963 (13) Sea Island Women's Invitational, St. Petersburg Women's Open, Alpine Civitan Open, Muskogee Civitan Open, Dallas Civitan Open, Babe Zaharias Open, **Women's Western Open**, Waterloo Women's Open Invitational, Albuquerque Swing Parade, Idaho Centennial Ladies' Open, Visalia Ladies' Open, Mickey Wright Invitational, **LPGA Championship**
- 1964 (11) Peach Blossom Invitational, Clifford Ann Creed Invitational, Squirt Ladies' Open Invitational, Muskogee Civitan Open, Lady Carling Eastern Open, Waldemar Open, **U.S. Women's Open**, Milwaukee Jaycee Open, Visalia Ladies' Open, Tall City Open, Mary Mills Mississippi Gulf Coast Invitational
- 1965 (2) Baton Rouge Invitational, Dallas Civitan Open
- 1966 (7) Venice Ladies Open, Shreveport Kiwanis Invitational, Bluegrass Ladies Invitational, **Women's Western Open**, Pacific Ladies' Classic, Shirley Englehorn Invitational, Mickey Wright Invitational
- 1967 (4) Shreveport Kiwanis Club Invitational, Bluegrass Invitational, Lady Carling Open (Maryland), Pensacola Ladies Invitational
- 1968 (4) Port Malabar Invitational, Palm Beach County Open, Tall City Open, 500 Ladies Classic
- 1969 (1) Bluegrass Invitational
- 1973 (1) Colgate-Dinah Shore Winner's Circle

Note: Wright won the Colgate-Dinah Shore Winner's Circle (now known as the Chevron Championship) before it became a major championship.

LPGA majors are shown in bold.

=== Other wins (8) ===
- 1959 Hoosier Celebrity
- 1961 Haig & Haig Scotch Foursome (with Dave Ragan)
- 1962 Naples Pro-Am (with Marilynn Smith)
- 1963 Haig & Haig Scotch Foursome (with Dave Ragan), Shell's Wonderful World of Golf
- 1966 Ladies World Series of Golf, Shell's Wonderful World of Golf
- 1967 Seven Lakes Invitational

== Major championships ==
=== Wins (13) ===
Year	Championship	Winning score	Margin	Runner(s)-up
1958	LPGA Championship	+8 (69-69-76-74=288)	6 strokes	(Uruguay) Fay Crocker
1958	U.S. Women's Open	−2 (74-72-70-74=290)	5 strokes	(United States) Louise Suggs
1959	U.S. Women's Open	+7 (72-75-69-71=287)	2 strokes	(United States) Louise Suggs
1960	LPGA Championship	−4 (71-76-74-71=292)	3 strokes	(United States) Louise Suggs
1961	Titleholders Championship	+11 (72-75-76-76=299)	1 stroke	(United States) Patty Berg, (United States) Louise Suggs
1961	U.S. Women's Open	+5 (72-80-69-72=293)	6 strokes	(United States) Betsy Rawls
1961	LPGA Championship	+3 (67-77-72-71=287)	9 strokes	(United States) Louise Suggs
1962	Titleholders Championship	+7 (73-75-70-77=295)	Playoff^{1}	(United States) Ruth Jessen
1962	Women's Western Open	+7 (69-74-76-76=295)	Playoff^{2}	(United States) Mary Lena Faulk
1963	Women's Western Open	−4 (78-70-71-73=292)	9 strokes	(United States) Kathy Whitworth
1963	LPGA Championship	+10 (72-82-70-70=294)	2 strokes	(United States) Mary Lena Faulk, (United States) Mary Mills, (United States) Louise Suggs
1964	U.S. Women's Open	−2 (71-71-75-73=290)	Playoff^{3}	(United States) Ruth Jessen
1966	Women's Western Open	+2 (72-78-76-76=302)	1 stroke	(United States) Jo Ann Prentice, (Australia) Margie Masters

^{1} In an 18-hole playoff, Wright 69, Jessen 72.
^{2} Wright won on the fourth hole of a sudden-death playoff.
^{3} In an 18-hole playoff, Wright 70, Jessen 72.

== See also ==
- List of golfers with most LPGA major championship wins
- List of golfers with most LPGA Tour wins
- Women's Career Grand Slam Champion
