= Marlene Hagge =

American professional golfer (1934–2023)

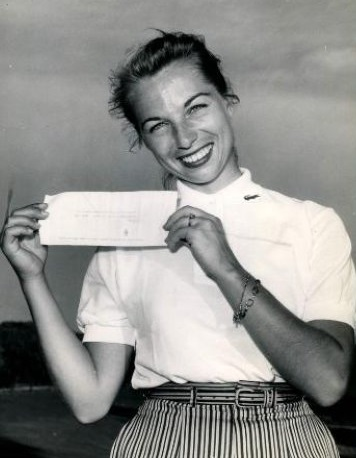
- Hagge in 1956

Personal information
- Full name: Marlene Bauer Hagge
- Nationality: United States
- Born: February 16, 1934 Eureka, South Dakota, U.S.
- Died: May 16, 2023 (aged 89) Rancho Mirage, California, U.S.
- Height: 5 ft 2 in (1.57 m)

Career
- Sport: Golf
- Turned professional: 1950
- Former tour: LPGA Tour (Founder)
- Professional wins: 26

Number of wins by tour
- LPGA Tour: 26

Best results in LPGA major championships (wins: 1)
- Western Open: 2nd: 1965
- Titleholders C'ship: 3rd: 1957
- Chevron Championship: T26: 1987
- Women's PGA C'ship: Won: 1956
- U.S. Women's Open: T2: 1952
- du Maurier Classic: T25: 1981

Achievements and awards
- World Golf Hall of Fame: 2002 (member page)
- Associated Press Female Athlete of the Year: 1949
- LPGA Tour Money Winner: 1956
- Commissioner's Award (LPGA Founders): 2000

Marlene Hagge (née Bauer; February 16, 1934 – May 16, 2023) was an American professional golfer. She was one of the thirteen founders of the LPGA in 1950. She won one major championship and 26 LPGA Tour career events. She is a member of the World Golf Hall of Fame.

== Amateur career ==
Hagge was born in Eureka, South Dakota on February 16, 1934. She had a progressively successful amateur experience, starting to play golf from the age of 3. At age 10, she won the Long Beach City Boys Junior. At age 13, she won the Western and National Junior Championships, the Los Angeles Women's City Championship, the Palm Springs Women's Championship, Northern California Open and the Indio Women's Invitational. In 1947, at age 13, she became the youngest player to make the cut at the U.S. Women's Open and finished 14th. In 1949, at the age of 15, she became the youngest athlete ever to be named Associated Press Athlete of the Year, Golfer of the Year and Teenager of the Year, and she won the U.S. Girls' Junior and the WWGA Junior titles.

== Professional career ==
Hagge was the youngest of the thirteen women who founded the LPGA in 1950, and remains the youngest ever member of the LPGA Tour. Her older sister, Alice Bauer, was also a founder. She won her first tournament in 1952 at the Sarasota Open. She would go on to win a total of 26 events on the LPGA Tour, including one major championship, the 1956 LPGA Championship. That year, she was also the tour's leading money winner and led the tour in wins with eight. In 2002, she was voted into the LPGA Tour Hall of Fame through the Veteran's Category and was officially inducted into the World Golf Hall of Fame. Her final competitive appearance on the LPGA Tour came in 1996.

Hagge appeared on the June 18, 1961, episode of the CBS game show What's My Line.

== Personal life and death ==
Marlene Bauer married Bob Hagge, her sister Alice's ex-husband in late 1955. They divorced in 1964.

Hagge was married to former PGA Tour golfer Ernie Vossler from 1995 until his death on February 16, 2013. They lived in La Quinta, California, where she remained until her death.

Hagge was the last survivor of the 13 LPGA Founders. She died in Rancho Mirage, California, on May 16, 2023, at the age of 89, of complications from a fall.

== Professional wins ==
=== LPGA Tour wins (26) ===
- 1952 (2) Sarasota Open, Bakersfield Open (tied with Betty Jameson, Betsy Rawls and Babe Zaharias)
- 1954 (1) New Orleans Open
- 1956 (8) Sea Island Open, Babe Zaharias Open, Pittsburgh Open, Triangle Round Robin, LPGA Championship, World Championship, Denver Open, Clock Open
- 1957 (2) Babe Zaharias Open, Lawton Open
- 1958 (2) Lake Worth Open Invitational, Land of Sky Open
- 1959 (2) Mayfair Open, Hoosier Open
- 1963 (1) Sight Open
- 1964 (1) Mickey Wright Invitational
- 1965 (5) Babe Zaharias Open, Milwaukee Open, Phoenix Thunderbirds Open, LPGA Tall City Open, Alamo Open
- 1969 (1) Stroh's-WBLY Open
- 1972 (1) Burdine's Invitational

== Major championships ==
=== Wins (1) ===
Year	Championship	Winning score	Margin	Runner-up
1956	LPGA Championship	−9 (69-73-73-76=291)	Playoff ^{1}	(United States) Patty Berg

^{1} Won on first hole of sudden-death playoff.

== See also ==
- List of golfers with most LPGA Tour wins
