= Ruth Jessen =

American professional golfer (1936–2007)

Personal information
- Full name: Mary Ruth Jessen
- Nationality: United States
- Born: November 12, 1936 Seattle, Washington, U.S.
- Died: September 21, 2007 (aged 70) Phoenix, Arizona, U.S.
- Height: 5 ft 7 in (1.70 m)

Career
- Sport: Golf
- College: Seattle University
- Turned professional: 1956
- Former tour: LPGA Tour (1956–1985)
- Professional wins: 13

Number of wins by tour
- LPGA Tour: 11
- Other: 2

Best results in LPGA major championships
- Western Open: T2: 1964
- Titleholders C'ship: 2nd: 1962
- Chevron Championship: DNP
- Women's PGA C'ship: 5th: 1963
- U.S. Women's Open: T2/2nd: 1962, 1964
- du Maurier Classic: CUT: 1984

Mary Ruth Jessen (November 12, 1936 – September 21, 2007) was an American professional golfer. She became a member of the LPGA Tour in 1956 and had 11 LPGA Tour victories in all.

== Amateur career ==
Born and raised in Seattle, Washington, Jessen grew up in the northeast part of the city, a half block from the Meadowbrook golf course (1928–1960), now Nathan Hale High School and Meadowbrook Playfield. She also played at Jackson Park and was a junior member at Inglewood Golf Club in Kenmore.

Jessen was a three-time winner of the Seattle City Championship from 1953 to 1955. She won the Washington State Amateur in 1954 and the Pacific Northwest Championship in 1954 and 1955. She was also the medalist at the 1953 National Junior Championship and runner-up at the 1956 National Collegiate Championship.

Jessen graduated from Roosevelt High School in 1955 and briefly played on the men's golf team at Seattle University in 1956 as a freshman. Seattle U. did not have women's teams then, but encouraged its outstanding female athletes to play on its (men's) teams, primarily in golf and tennis.

== Professional career ==
Unconventional for the era, Jessen left college after one year to turn professional, and joined the LPGA Tour. She won 11 times on the LPGA Tour between 1959 and 1971. She finished as runner-up in major championships four times. Two of these were 18-hole playoff losses: at the 1962 Titleholders Championship and the 1964 U.S. Women's Open, both to Mickey Wright. Jessen was in the top-10 on the money list once, the runner-up in 1964 with $23,431, after five tour victories that year.

Jessen suffered from several health issues throughout her career, including uterine cancer at age 32, and had over a dozen surgeries for her various ailments. She won the 1971 Ben Hogan Award after returning from elbow surgery. She was also known for her unusually wide putting stance.

== Death ==
Jessen died at age 70 of lung cancer in 2007 in Phoenix, Arizona.

== Professional wins (13) ==
=== LPGA Tour wins (11) ===
- 1959 (1) Tampa Open
- 1961 (1) Peach Blossom Open
- 1962 (2) Dallas Civitan Open, Sacramento Open
- 1963 (1) Cosmopolitan Women's Open
- 1964 (5) Babe Zaharias Open Invitational, Yankee Women's Open, Omaha Jaycee Open Invitational, Hillside House Ladies' Open, Phoenix Thunderbirds Ladies' Open
- 1971 (1) Sears Women's World Classic

=== Other wins (2) ===
- 1963 Naples Professional
- 1965 Haig & Haig Scotch Foursome (with Gardner Dickinson)

== See also ==
- List of golfers with most LPGA Tour wins
