= 1957 LPGA Tour =

Golf tour season

1957 LPGA Tour season
- Duration: January 11, 1957 – October 21, 1957
- Number of official events: 25
- Most wins: 5 (United States) Patty Berg, (United States) Betsy Rawls
- Money leader: (United States) Patty Berg
- Vare Trophy: (United States) Louise Suggs

The 1957 LPGA Tour was the eighth season since the LPGA Tour officially began in 1950. The season ran from January 11 to October 21. The season consisted of 25 official money events. Patty Berg and Betsy Rawls won the most tournaments, five each. Berg led the money list with earnings of $16,272.

There was only one first-time winner in 1957, Wiffi Smith.

The tournament results and award winners are listed below.

== Tournament results ==
The following table shows all the official money events for the 1957 season. "Date" is the ending date of the tournament. The numbers in parentheses after the winners' names are the number of wins they had on the tour up to and including that event. Majors are shown in bold.

Date	Tournament	Location	Winner	Score	Purse ($)	1st prize ($)
Jan 13	Sea Island Open	Georgia	(United States) Mickey Wright (2)	220	4,488	880
Jan 20	Tampa Open	Florida	(United States) Betsy Rawls (22)	298	4,488	880
Jan 27	Lake Worth Open	Florida	(United States) Betsy Rawls (23)	214	4,488	880
Feb 3	Havana Open	Cuba	(United States) Patty Berg (43)	210	4,488	880
Feb 10	Serbin Open	Florida	(Uruguay) Fay Crocker (6)	143	3,500	630
Feb 17	St. Petersburg Open	Florida	(United States) Mary Lena Faulk (2)	279	4,488	880
Mar 3	Jacksonville Open	Florida	(United States) Mickey Wright (3)	295	5,000	880
Mar 16	**Titleholders Championship**	Georgia	(United States) **Patty Berg (44)**	296	5,000	1,000
Apr 14	Dallas Open	Texas	(United States) Wiffi Smith (1)	285	6,670	1,316
Apr 21	Babe Zaharias Open	Texas	(United States) Marlene Hagge (12)	222	4,640	882
Apr 28	**Women's Western Open**	Alabama	(United States) **Patty Berg (45)**	291	5,000	1,000
May 5	Peach Blossom Open	South Carolina	(United States) Betsy Rawls (24)	213	4,488	880
May 12	Smokey Open	Tennessee	(United States) Beverly Hanson (9)	295	7,500	1,350
May 26	Land of Sky Open	North Carolina	(United States) Beverly Hanson (10)	286	6,478	1,316
Jun 2	Triangle Round Robin	Virginia	(Uruguay) Fay Crocker (7)	+51	9,600	1,500
Jun 10	**LPGA Championship**	Pennsylvania	(United States) **Louise Suggs (38)**	285	6,750	1,316
Jun 29	**U.S. Women's Open**	New York	(United States) **Betsy Rawls (25)**	299	6,820	1,800
Jul 28	Wolverine Open	Michigan	(United States) Mickey Wright (4)	284	7,500	1,392
Aug 11	All American Open	Illinois	(United States) Patty Berg (46)	302	15,000	6,000
Aug 11	World Championship	Illinois	(United States) Patty Berg (47)	302	15,000	6,000
Aug 18	Colonial Open	Mississippi	(United States) Betty Dodd (2)	215	4,587	880
Sep 30	Reno Open	Nevada	(United States) Betsy Rawls (26)	143 (−1)	3,500	
Oct 6	United Voluntary Services Open	California	(United States) Wiffi Smith (2)	221	4,744	831
Oct 7	Heart of America Invitational	Missouri	(United States) Louise Suggs (39)	220	4,382	880
Oct 21	Lawton Open	Oklahoma	(United States) Marlene Hagge (13)	216	4,489	800

== Awards ==
Award	Winner	Country
Money winner	Patty Berg (3)	United States
Scoring leader (Vare Trophy)	Louise Suggs	United States
