= 1958 LPGA Tour =

Golf tour season

1958 LPGA Tour season
- Duration: January 10, 1958 – September 14, 1958
- Number of official events: 24
- Most wins: 5 (United States) Mickey Wright
- Money leader: (United States) Beverly Hanson
- Vare Trophy: (United States) Beverly Hanson

The 1958 LPGA Tour was the ninth season since the LPGA Tour officially began in 1950. The season ran from January 10 to September 14. The season consisted of 24 official money events. Mickey Wright won the most tournaments, five. Beverly Hanson led the money list with earnings of $12,639.

There was only one first-time winner in 1958, Bonnie Randolph.

The tournament results and award winners are listed below.

== Tournament results ==
The following table shows all the official money events for the 1958 season. "Date" is the ending date of the tournament. The numbers in parentheses after the winners' names are the number of wins they had on the tour up to and including that event. Majors are shown in bold.

Date	Tournament	Location	Winner	Score	Purse ($)	1st prize ($)
Jan 12	Sea Island Open	Georgia	(United States) Mickey Wright (5)	224	4,750	831
Jan 20	Tampa Open	Florida	(United States) Betsy Rawls (27)	302	7,500	1,247
Jan 26	Lake Worth Open Invitational	Florida	(United States) Marlene Hagge (14)	218	5,000	831
Feb 2	Havana Biltmore Open	Cuba	(Uruguay) Fay Crocker (8)	222	5,000	
Feb 16	St. Petersburg Open	Florida	(United States) Betsy Rawls (28)	291	7,000	1,248
Mar 2	Jacksonville Open	Florida	(United States) Marilynn Smith (4)	299	5,000	875
Mar 16	**Titleholders Championship**	Georgia	(United States) **Beverly Hanson (11)**	299	5,275	1,000
Apr 20	Babe Zaharias Open	Texas	(United States) Louise Suggs (40)	214	4,487	831
May 11	Lawton Open	Oklahoma	(United States) Beverly Hanson (12)	212	4,000	831
May 18	Peach Blossom Open	South Carolina	(United States) Wiffi Smith (3)	216	4,000	831
May 28	Land of Sky Open	North Carolina	(United States) Marlene Hagge (15)	213	4,750	831
Jun 1	Gatlinburg Open	Tennessee	(United States) Louise Suggs (41)	222	4,750	831
Jun 8	**LPGA Championship**	Pennsylvania	(United States) **Mickey Wright (6)**	288	7,500	1,247
Jun 15	Triangle Round Robin	Massachusetts	(United States) Louise Suggs (42)	+51	9,000	1,425
Jun 22	**Women's Western Open**	Pennsylvania	(United States) **Patty Berg (48)**	293	4,750	950
Jun 28	**U.S. Women's Open**	Michigan	(United States) **Mickey Wright (7)**	290	7,200	1,800
Jul 13	American Women's Open	Minnesota	(United States) Patty Berg (49)	288	7,000	1,225
Jul 27	French Lick Open	Indiana	(United States) Louise Suggs (43)	300	7,000	1,247
Aug 10	Macktown Open	Illinois	(United States) Mary Lena Faulk (3)	216	6,500	988
Aug 17	Kansas City Open	Missouri	(United States) Bonnie Randolph (1)	219	4,750	831
Aug 24	Waterloo Open	Iowa	(Uruguay) Fay Crocker (9)	287	7,000	1,247
Sep 1	Opie Turner Open	Oklahoma	(United States) Mickey Wright (8)	222	7,500	1,247
Sep 8	Dallas Open	Texas	(United States) Mickey Wright (9)	284	8,500	1,247
Sep 14	Jackson Open	Mississippi	(United States) Jackie Pung (5)	220	4,748	831

== Awards ==
Award	Winner	Country
Money winner	Beverly Hanson	United States
Scoring leader (Vare Trophy)	Beverly Hanson	United States
