= 1956 LPGA Tour =

Golf tour season

1956 LPGA Tour season
- Duration: January 14, 1956 – October 21, 1956
- Number of official events: 25
- Most wins: 5 (United States) Marlene Hagge
- Money leader: (United States) Marlene Hagge
- Vare Trophy: (United States) Patty Berg

The 1956 LPGA Tour was the seventh season since the LPGA Tour officially began in 1950. The season ran from January 14 to October 21. The season consisted of 25 official money events. Marlene Hagge won the most tournaments, eight. She also led the money list with earnings of $20,235.

The season saw the first tournament outside United States, the Havana Open in Cuba. There were five first-time winners in 1956, Kathy Cornelius, Betty Dodd, Mary Lena Faulk, Mickey Wright, and Joyce Ziske. Wright would win 82 LPGA events in her career, second only to Kathy Whitworth's 88.

The tournament results and award winners are listed below.

== Tournament results ==
The following table shows all the official money events for the 1956 season. "Date" is the ending date of the tournament. The numbers in parentheses after the winners' names are the number of wins they had on the tour up to and including that event. Majors are shown in bold.

Date	Tournament	Location	Winner	Score	Purse ($)	1st prize ($)
Jan 15	Sea Island Open	Georgia	(United States) Marlene Hagge (4)	152	3,000	630
Jan 22	Tampa Open	Florida	(United States) Betsy Rawls (19)	293	4,500	900
Feb 5	Havana Open	Cuba	(United States) Louise Suggs (35)	227	4,500	1,000
Feb 12	Serbin Open	Florida	(Uruguay) Fay Crocker (4)	144	3,500	630
Feb 19	St. Petersburg Open	Florida	(United States) Kathy Cornelius (1)	287	5,000	900
Feb 26	Sarasota Open	Florida	(United States) Betsy Rawls (20)	291	5,000	1,000
Mar 5	Jacksonville Open	Florida	(United States) Mickey Wright (1)	294	4,500	900
Mar 11	**Titleholders Championship**	Georgia	(United States) **Louise Suggs (36)**	302	5,000	1,000
Apr 15	Babe Zaharias Open	Texas	(United States) Marlene Hagge (5)	219	4,000	900
Apr 22	Dallas Open	Texas	(United States) Patty Berg (41)	291	7,500	1,350
Apr 29	Peach Blossom Open	South Carolina	(United States) Betsy Rawls (21)	292	4,000	900
Jun 3	Pittsburgh Open	Pennsylvania	(United States) Marlene Hagge (6)	293	6,000	
Jun 10	Triangle Round Robin	Virginia	(United States) Marlene Hagge (7)	+50	10,000	2,000
Jun 24	**LPGA Championship**	Michigan	(United States) **Marlene Hagge (8)**	291	6,500	1,350
Jul 1	**Women's Western Open**	Iowa	(United States) **Beverly Hanson (8)**	304	5,000	1,000
Jul 8	Syracuse Open	New York	(United States) Joyce Ziske (1)	221	6,500	1,316
Jul 29	**U.S. Women's Open**	Minnesota	(United States) **Kathy Cornelius (2)**	302	6,000	1,500
Aug 5	All American Open	Illinois	(United States) Louise Suggs (37)	301	5,000	1,000
Aug 12	World Championship	Illinois	(United States) Marlene Hagge (9)	298	14,000	6,000
Aug 19	St. Louis Open	Missouri	(Uruguay) Fay Crocker (5)	288	4,000	880
Aug 26	Denver Open	Colorado	(United States) Marlene Hagge (10)	284	4,000	800
Sep 16	Clock Open	California	(United States) Marlene Hagge (11)	292	4,500	900
Oct 7	Kansas City Open	Missouri	(United States) Mary Lena Faulk (1)	214	5,000	880
Oct 14	Arkansas Open	Arkansas	(United States) Patty Berg (42)	287	4,000	880
Oct 21	Lawton Open	Oklahoma	(United States) Betty Dodd (1)	214	4,000	880

== Awards ==
Award	Winner	Country
Money winner	Marlene Hagge	United States
Scoring leader (Vare Trophy)	Patty Berg (3)	United States
