= List of Titleholders Championship champions =

The Titleholders Championship was an annual golf competition. It was established in 1937 and was a women's major championships. This event was conducted in stroke play competition, and it was played at Augusta Country Club, not Augusta National Golf Club, except in 1972 when it was contested at the Pines Needles Lodge and Golf Club in Southern Pines, North Carolina.

Patty Berg held the record for the most victories with seven, and Berg had the most consecutive wins with three.

== Key ==
†	Tournament won in a playoff
*	Tournament won by an amateur
¤	Tournament was won in 54-holes

== Champions ==
Year	Country	Champion	Total score	Total par	Notes
1937	USA	Patty Berg *	240 ¤	+3	
1938	USA	Patty Berg *	311	-5	
1939	USA	Patty Berg *	319	+19	
1940	USA	Helen Hicks *	336	+36	
1941	USA	Dorothy Kirby *	224 ¤	-1	
1942	USA	Dorothy Kirby *	239 ¤	+14	
1943	—	None	—	—	—
1944	—	None	—	—	—
1945	—	None	—	—	—
1946	USA	Louise Suggs *	314	+14	
1947	USA	Babe Zaharias *	304	+4	
1948	USA	Patty Berg	308	+8	
1949	USA	Peggy Kirk *	299	-1	
1950	USA	Babe Zaharias	298	+10	
1951	USA	Pat O'Sullivan *	301	+13	
1952	USA	Babe Zaharias	299	+11	
1953	USA	Patty Berg	294	+6	
1954	USA	Louise Suggs	293	+5	
1955	USA	Patty Berg	291	+3	
1956	USA	Louise Suggs	302	+2	
1957	USA	Patty Berg	293	+8	
1958	USA	Beverly Hanson	299	+11	
1959	USA	Louise Suggs	297	+9	
1960	URU	Fay Crocker	303	+15	
1961	USA	Mickey Wright	299	+11	
1962	USA	Mickey Wright †	295	+7	^{[a]}
1963	USA	Marilynn Smith †	292	E	^{[b]}
1964	USA	Marilynn Smith	289	+1	
1965	USA	Kathy Whitworth	287	-1	
1966	USA	Kathy Whitworth	291	+3	
1967	—	None	—	—	—
1968	—	None	—	—	—
1969	—	None	—	—	—
1970	—	None	—	—	—
1971	—	None	—	—	—
1972	USA	Sandra Palmer	283	-1	

== Multiple winners ==
This table lists the golfers who have won more than one Titleholders Championship as a major championship. Bolded years and player name indicates consecutive victories. The (a) denotes amateur golfer.

Grand Slam winners ‡

Country	Golfer	Total	Years
United States	**Patty Berg**	7	**1937 (a)**, **1938 (a)**, **1939 (a)**, 1948, 1953, 1955, 1957
United States	Louise Suggs ‡	4	1946 (a), 1954, 1956, 1959
United States	Babe Zaharias	3	1947 (a), 1950, 1952
United States	**Dorothy Kirby** (a)	2	**1941**, **1942**
United States	**Mickey Wright** ‡	2	**1961**, **1962**
United States	**Marilynn Smith**	2	**1963**, **1964**
United States	**Kathy Whitworth**	2	**1965**, **1966**

== Notes ==
- **^{a}** Mickey Wright won in an 18-hole playoff over Ruth Jessen, 69-72.
- **^{b}** Marilynn Smith won in an 18-hole playoff over Mickey Wright, 72-73.

== Winners by nationality ==
This table lists the total number of titles won by golfers of each nationality as a major.

Rank	Nationality	Wins	Winners	First title	Last title
1	United States	27	12	1937	1972
2	Uruguay	1	1	1960	

== See also ==
- Chronological list of LPGA major golf champions
- List of LPGA major championship winning golfers
- Grand Slam (golf)
