= 1958 in sports =

1958 in sports describes the year's events in world sport.

== American football ==
- NFL Championship: the Baltimore Colts won 23–17 (OT) over the New York Giants at Yankee Stadium (later called the "Greatest game ever played")

== Artistic gymnastics ==
- World Artistic Gymnastics Championships
  - Men's all-around champion: Boris Shakhlin, USSR
  - Women's all-around champion: Larisa Latynina, USSR
  - Team competition champions: men's – USSR; women's – USSR

== Association football ==
- February 6 – Munich air disaster. 23 people died as a result of the crash at Munich airport including 7 Manchester United players:
  - Geoff Bent (25)
  - Roger Byrne (28)
  - Eddie Colman (21)
  - Mark Jones (24)
  - David Pegg (22)
  - Tommy Taylor (26)
  - Liam Whelan (22)
  - Duncan Edwards (21), who died of his injuries on 21 February
- Also killed was former Manchester City and England goalkeeper Frank Swift (44), who was then a reporter

=== FIFA World Cup ===
- 1958 World Cup held in Sweden. Brazil beat Sweden 5–2 in the final.

=== Europe ===
- European Cup – Real Madrid beat A.C. Milan 3–2.
- Inter-Cities Fairs Cup – FC Barcelona beat London XI 8–2 on aggregate.

=== England ===
- First Division – Wolverhampton Wanderers win the 1957–58 title.
- FA Cup – Bolton Wanderers beat Manchester United 2–0.

== Athletics ==
- Sixth European Championships, held from August 19 to August 24 in Stockholm, Sweden

== Australian rules football ==
- Victorian Football League
  - Collingwood wins the 62nd VFL Premiership (Collingwood 12.10 (82) d Melbourne 9.10 (64))
  - Brownlow Medal was awarded to Neil Roberts (St Kilda)

== Baseball ==
- January 29 – The Brooklyn Dodgers catcher Roy Campanella suffers a broken neck in an early morning auto accident on Long Island. His spinal column is nearly severed and his legs are permanently paralyzed.
- January 30 – Commissioner Ford Frick announces that players and coaches, rather than the fans, will vote for the All-Star teams.
- April 15 – San Francisco Giants pitcher Rubén Gómez won baseball's first regular season game on the West Coast. He started the first game in San Francisco history, beating Don Drysdale and the visiting Los Angeles Dodgers in an 8-0 shutout at Seals Stadium. The two teams moved from New York after the 1957 season.
- World Series – New York Yankees win 4 games to 3 over the Milwaukee Braves. The Series MVP is pitcher Bob Turley of New York.

== Basketball ==
- NCAA Men's Basketball Championship –
  - Kentucky wins 84–72 over Seattle
- NBA Finals:
  - St. Louis Hawks win 4 games to 2 over the Boston Celtics
- A FIBA European Champions Cup (present day of Euro Basketball League), first official game held on February 22, and Rīgas ASK won first season on title.

== Biathlon ==
- The 1st Biathlon World Championships were held in Saalfelden, Austria.

== Boxing ==
- December 10 – Light-heavyweight champion Archie Moore is knocked down three times in the first round and once more in the fifth round by Yvon Durelle but Moore held on to come back to knock out Durelle in the 11th round.

== Canadian football ==
- The Canadian Football League is officially established in its present form.
- Grey Cup – Winnipeg Blue Bombers win 35–28 over the Hamilton Tiger-Cats

== Cycling ==
- Tour de France won by Charly Gaul of Luxembourg
- September 13 – death in a racing accident of Russell Mockridge (30), Australian racing cyclist

== Figure skating ==
- World Figure Skating Championships:
  - Men's champion: David Jenkins, United States
  - Ladies' champion: Carol Heiss, United States
  - Pair skating champions: Barbara Wagner & Robert Paul, Canada
  - Ice dancing champions: June Markham & Courtney Jones, Great Britain

== Golf ==
Men's professional

- Masters Tournament – Arnold Palmer
- U.S. Open – Tommy Bolt
- British Open – Peter Thomson
- PGA Championship – Dow Finsterwald
- PGA Tour money leader – Arnold Palmer – $42,608

Men's amateur

- British Amateur – Joe Carr
- U.S. Amateur – Charles Coe

Women's professional

- Women's Western Open – Patty Berg
- LPGA Championship – Mickey Wright
- U.S. Women's Open – Mickey Wright
- Titleholders Championship – Beverly Hanson
- LPGA Tour money leader – Beverly Hanson – $12,639

== Harness racing ==
- United States Pacing Triple Crown races:
  1. Cane Pace – Raider Frost
  2. Little Brown Jug – Shadow Wave
  3. Messenger Stakes – O'Brien Hanover
- United States Trotting Triple Crown races:
  1. Hambletonian – Emily's Pride
  2. Yonkers Trot – Spunky Hanover
  3. Kentucky Futurity – Emily's Pride
- Australian Inter Dominion Harness Racing Championship:
  - Pacers: Free Hall

== Horse racing ==
- Tim Tam, who had won the Kentucky Derby and Preakness, fractured a sesamoid bone and lost his chance for the Triple Crown when he hobbled across the finish line in second place at the Belmont Stakes.

Steeplechases

- Cheltenham Gold Cup – Kerstin
- Grand National – Mr What

Flat races

- Australia – Melbourne Cup won by Baystone
- Canada – Queen's Plate won by Caledon Beau
- France – Prix de l'Arc de Triomphe won by Ballymoss
- Ireland – Irish Derby Stakes won by Sindon
- English Triple Crown Races:
  1. 2,000 Guineas Stakes – Pall Mall
  2. The Derby – Hard Ridden
  3. St. Leger Stakes – Alcide
- United States Triple Crown Races:
  1. Kentucky Derby – Tim Tam
  2. Preakness Stakes – Tim Tam
  3. Belmont Stakes – Cavan

== Ice hockey ==
- January 18 – Willie O'Ree makes his NHL debut with the Boston Bruins. He is the first Black Canadian to play in the National Hockey League.
- Art Ross Trophy as the NHL's leading scorer during the regular season: Dickie Moore, Montreal Canadiens
- Hart Memorial Trophy for the NHL's Most Valuable Player: Gordie Howe, Detroit Red Wings
- Stanley Cup – Montreal Canadiens win 4–2 over the Boston Bruins
- World Hockey Championship
  - Men's champion: Whitby Dunlops from Canada defeat the Soviet Union
- NCAA Men's Ice Hockey Championship – University of Denver Pioneers defeat University of North Dakota Fighting Sioux 6–2 in Minneapolis, Minnesota

== Pétanque ==
- The sport's international federation is founded in Marseille

== Rugby league ==
- 1958 Great Britain Lions tour
- 1958 New Zealand rugby league season
- 1958 NSWRFL season
- 1957–58 Northern Rugby Football League season / 1958–59 Northern Rugby Football League season

== Rugby union ==
- 64th Five Nations Championship series is won by England

== Skiing ==
- Men's FIS World Championships:
  - Downhill: Toni Sailer (Austria)
  - Giant Slalom: Toni Sailer (Austria)
  - Slalom: Josl Rieder (Austria)
  - Combined: Toni Sailer (Austria)
- Women's FIS World Championships:
  - Downhill: Lucille Wheeler (Canada)
  - Giant Slalom: Lucille Wheeler (Canada)
  - Slalom: Inger Bjørnbakken (Norway)
  - Combined: Frieda Dänzer (Switzerland)

== Swimming ==
- June 29 – US swimmer Nancy Ramey sets the first official world record in the women's 200m butterfly at a meet in Los Angeles, clocking 2:40.5.
- September 13 – Tineke Lagerberg from the Netherlands takes over the world record in the women's 200m butterfly during a meet in Naarden, the Netherlands – 2:38.9.

== Tennis ==
Australia

- Australian Men's Singles Championship – Ashley Cooper (Australia) defeats Malcolm Anderson (Australia) 7–5, 6–3, 6–4
- Australian Women's Singles Championship – Angela Mortimer Barrett (Great Britain) defeats Lorraine Coghlan Robinson (Australia) 6–3, 6–4

England

- Wimbledon Men's Singles Championship – Ashley Cooper (Australia) defeats Neale Fraser (Australia) 3–6, 6–3, 6–4, 13–11
- Wimbledon Women's Singles Championship – Althea Gibson (USA) defeats Angela Mortimer (Great Britain) 8–6, 6–2

France

- French Men's Singles Championship – Mervyn Rose (Australia) defeats Luis Ayala (Chile) 6–3, 6–4, 6–4
- French Women's Singles Championship – Zsuzsa Körmöczy (Hungary) defeats Shirley Bloomer (Great Britain) 6–4, 1–6, 6–2

USA

- American Men's Singles Championship – Ashley Cooper (Australia) defeats Malcolm Anderson (Australia) 6–2, 3–6, 4–6, 10–8, 8–6
- American Women's Singles Championship – Althea Gibson (USA) defeats Darlene Hard (USA) 3–6, 6–1, 6–2

Davis Cup

- 1958 Davis Cup – United States 3–2 Australia at Milton Courts (grass) Brisbane, Australia

== Yacht racing ==
- The New York Yacht Club retains the America's Cup as Columbia defeats British challenger Sceptre, of the Royal Yacht Squadron, 4 races to 0; it is the first Cup series held in the era of the 12-metre yacht.

== Multi-sport events ==
- Asian Games held in Tokyo, Japan
- 1958 British Empire and Commonwealth Games held in Cardiff, Wales

== Awards ==
- Associated Press Male Athlete of the Year – Herb Elliott, Track and field
- Associated Press Female Athlete of the Year – Althea Gibson, Tennis
