= 1960 LPGA Tour =

Golf tour season

1960 LPGA Tour season
- Duration: January 15, 1960 – September 25, 1960
- Number of official events: 24
- Most wins: 6 (United States) Mickey Wright
- Money leader: (United States) Louise Suggs
- Vare Trophy: (United States) Mickey Wright

The 1960 LPGA Tour was the 11th season since the LPGA Tour officially began in 1950. The season ran from January 15 to September 25. The season consisted of 23 official money events. Mickey Wright won the most tournaments, six. Louise Suggs led the money list with earnings of $16,892.

There were no first-time winners in 1960, the only season in LPGA history that this happened.

The tournament results and award winners are listed below.

== Tournament results ==
The following table shows all the official money events for the 1960 season. "Date" is the ending date of the tournament. The numbers in parentheses after the winners' names are the number of wins they had on the tour up to and including that event. Majors are shown in bold.

| Date | Tournament | Location | Winner | Score | Purse ($) | 1st prize ($) |
|---|---|---|---|---|---|---|
| Jan 17 | Sea Island Open | Georgia | (United States) Mickey Wright (14) | 219 | 5,700 | 997 |
| Feb 14 | St. Petersburg Open | Florida | (United States) Beverly Hanson (17) | 287 | 7,000 | 1,247 |
| Feb 21 | Lake Worth Open | Florida | (Uruguay) Fay Crocker (10) | 285 | 7,000 | 1,247 |
| Feb 28 | Tampa Open | Florida | (United States) Mickey Wright (15) | 217 | 7,000 | 1,247 |
| Mar 13 | **Titleholders Championship** | Georgia | (Uruguay) **Fay Crocker (11)** | 303 | 6,000 | 1,140 |
| Mar 27 | Royal Crown Open | Georgia | (United States) Wiffi Smith (6) | 298 | 7,600 | 1,330 |
| Apr 10 | Babe Zaharias Open | Texas | (United States) Betsy Rawls (39) | 211 | 6,000 | 1,083 |
| Apr 24 | Dallas Civitan Open | Texas | (United States) Louise Suggs (47) | 281 | 9,500 | 1,662 |
| May 7 | Betsy Rawls Peach Blossom Open | South Carolina | (United States) Wiffi Smith (7) | 212 | 5,500 | 997 |
| Jun 5 | Wolverine Open | Michigan | (United States) Joyce Ziske (3) | 299 | 7,500 | 1,247 |
| Jun 12 | Triangle Round Robin | New York | (United States) Louise Suggs (48) | +59 | 12,000 | 1,245 |
| Jun 19 | Cosmopolitan Open | Illinois | (United States) Betsy Rawls (40) | 208 | 7,500 | 1,247 |
| Jun 26 | **Women's Western Open** | Illinois | (United States) **Joyce Ziske (4)** | 301 | 7,000 | 1,247 |
| Jul 4 | **LPGA Championship** | Indiana | (United States) **Mickey Wright (16)** | 292 | 8,500 | 1,500 |
| Jul 10 | Youngstown Kitchens Trumbull Open | Ohio | (United States) Louise Suggs (49) | 288 | 11,000 | 2,500 |
| Jul 23 | **U.S. Women's Open** | Massachusetts | (United States) **Betsy Rawls (41)** | 292 | 7,200 | 1,710 |
| Jul 31 | American Women's Open | Minnesota | (United States) Patty Berg (50) | 292 | 7,000 | 1,247 |
| Aug 7 | Waterloo Open | Iowa | (United States) Wiffi Smith (8) | 286 | 7,000 | 1,247 |
| Aug 21 | Asheville Open | North Carolina | (United States) Betsy Rawls (42) | 211 | 7,000 | 1,247 |
| Aug 27 | Grossinger Open | New York | (United States) Mickey Wright (17) | 218 | 7,000 | 1,247 |
| Sep 1 | Eastern Open | Pennsylvania | (United States) Mickey Wright (18) | 213 | 7,500 | 1,247 |
| Sep 18 | Memphis Open | Tennessee | (United States) Mickey Wright (19) | 278 | 7,500 | 1,247 |
| Sep 25 | San Antonio Civitan | Texas | (United States) Louise Suggs (50) | 215 | 6,500 | 1,068 |

== Awards ==
| Award | Winner | Country |
|---|---|---|
| Money winner | Louise Suggs (2) | United States |
| Scoring leader (Vare Trophy) | Mickey Wright | United States |
