= 1954 Women's Western Open =

Golf tournament

Coordinates: 42.3921°N 87.8336°W

Tournament information
- Dates: June 14–19, 1954
- Location: Waukegan, Illinois
- Course: Glen Flora Country Club
- Tour: LPGA Tour
- Format: Stroke play/match play

Statistics
- Par: 75
- Length: 6,550 yards (5,990 m)
- Field: 100 players, 32 to match play
- Cut: 89 (+14)
- Prize fund: $1,500
- Winner's share: $1,000

Champion
- Betty Jameson
- def. Louise Suggs, 6 & 5
- Location within the United States Location within Illinois

The 1954 Women's Western Open was a golf competition held at Glen Flora Country Club in Waukegan, Illinois from June 14–19, 1954. It was the 25th edition of the Women's Western Open.

The field of 100 golfers played an 18-hole qualifying round to determine the 32 players advancing to match play. Patty Berg won medalist honors with a qualifying round of 70 (−5). Match play was over 18 holes for each round except the 36-hole final. After the first round of match play, ten professional and six amateur golfers remained in the field.

Betty Jameson won the championship by defeating Louise Suggs in the final match, 6 and 5. Jameson earned $1,000 and Suggs earned $500 from the $1,500 purse.

== Final 16 bracket ==
Round of 16; June 16
Patty Berg	1up
Fay Crocker
Alice Dye (a)	5&4
Jean Hopkins (a)
Betsy Rawls	6&5
Pat Lesser (a)
Betty Jameson	6&4
Betty Bush
Beverly Hanson	19h
Jackie Pung
Louise Suggs	6&4
Mickey Wright (a)
Betty Hicks	4&2
Polly Martin (a)
Alice Bauer Hagge	19h
Virginia Dennehy (a)

Quarterfinals; June 17
Patty Berg	6&5
Alice Dye (a)
Betsy Rawls
Betty Jameson	6&5
Beverly Hanson
Louise Suggs	1up
Betty Hicks	19h
Alice Bauer Hagge

Semifinals; June 18
Patty Berg
Betty Jameson	2&1
Louise Suggs	5&4
Betty Hicks

Finals; June 19
Betty Jameson	6&5
Louise Suggs
