= 1956 LPGA Championship =

Coordinates: 42.597°N 83.297°W

Tournament information
- Dates: June 21–24, 1956
- Location: Bloomfield Hills, Michigan
- Course: Forest Lake Country Club
- Tour: LPGA Tour
- Format: Stroke play – 72 holes

Statistics
- Par: 75
- Length: 6,415 yards (5,866 m)
- Cut: none
- Prize fund: $6,500
- Winner's share: $1,350

Champion
- (United States) Marlene Hagge
- 291 (−9), playoff

Location in the United States
Location in Michigan

The 1956 LPGA Championship was the second LPGA Championship, held June 21–24 at Forest Lake Country Club in Bloomfield Hills, Michigan, a suburb northwest of Detroit.

Marlene Hagge, age 22, won her only major title in a sudden death playoff over runner-up Patty Berg, who missed a bogey putt on the first playoff hole to stay alive. The two were co-leaders after 54 holes and both shot 76 (+1) in the final round to tie at 291 (−9), five strokes ahead of third-place finisher Betty Jameson. Defending champion Beverly Hanson finished ten strokes back, tied for sixth.

The course hosted its second major two years later, the U.S. Women's Open in 1958.

== Final leaderboard ==
Sunday, June 24, 1956

Place	Player	Score	To par	Money ($)
T1	(United States) Marlene Hagge	69-73-73-76=291	−9	Playoff
T1	(United States) Patty Berg	71-73-71-76=291	−9	Playoff
3	(United States) Betty Jameson	74-72-77-73=296	−4	765
4	(United States) Mickey Wright	74-74-72-77=297	−3	657
5	(United States) Joyce Ziske	73-75-75-77=300	E	572
T6	(United States) Alice Bauer	75-73-75-78=301	+1	456
T6	(United States) Beverly Hanson	77-75-72-77=301	+1	456
T8	(United States) Kathy Cornelius	79-72-71-80=302	+2	285
T8	(United States) Betty Dodd	77-76-74-75=302	+2	285
T8	(United States) Louise Suggs	72-76-77-77=302	+2	285

=== Playoff ===
Place	Player	Score	To par	Money ($)
1	(United States) Marlene Hagge	5	E	1,350
2	(United States) Patty Berg	7	+2	945
