= 1960 Titleholders Championship =

Golf tournament in Augusta, Georgia, US

Tournament information
- Dates: March 10–14, 1960
- Location: Augusta, Georgia; 33.483°N 82.011°W
- Course: Augusta Country Club
- Tour: LPGA Tour
- Format: Stroke play – 72 holes

Statistics
- Par: 72
- Length: 6,300 yards (5,760 m)
- Prize fund: $6,500
- Winner's share: $1,200

Champion
- (Uruguay) Fay Crocker
- 303 (+15)
- Location in the United States Location in Georgia

The 1960 Titleholders Championship was the 21st Titleholders Championship, held March 10–14 at Augusta Country Club in Augusta, Georgia. Fay Crocker, age 45, led all four rounds and won the second of her two major titles, seven strokes ahead of runner-up Kathy Cornelius, with Mickey Wright a stroke back in third place.

It was the largest margin of victory at the Titleholders in a decade, since Babe Zaharias won by eight strokes in 1950.

A snowstorm on Friday postponed the second round until Saturday, and the final two rounds were played on Sunday and Monday.

== Final leaderboard ==
Monday, March 14, 1960

Place	Player	Score	To par	Money ($)
1	(Uruguay) Fay Crocker	75-75-77-76=303	+15	1,200
2	(United States) Kathy Cornelius	79-75-78-78=310	+22	900
3	(United States) Mickey Wright	81-78-78-74=311	+23	700
T4	(United States) Patty Berg	83-76-76-77=312	+24	538
T4	(United States) Mary Lena Faulk	78-82-70-82=312	+24	538
6	(United States) Joyce Ziske	79-82-77-75=313	+25	425
T7	(United States) Beverly Hanson	77-84-76-78=315	+27	350
T7	(United States) Betty Jameson	79-78-77-81=315	+27	350
9	(United States) Marlene Hagge	77-80-78-81=316	+28	275
T10	(United States) Betty Bush	78-82-82-75=317	+29	238
T10	(United States) Marilynn Smith	79-77-77-84=317	+29	238
