= 1956 U.S. Women's Open =

Coordinates: 46.826°N 92.049°W

Tournament information
- Dates: July 26–29, 1956
- Location: Duluth, Minnesota
- Course: Northland Country Club
- Organized by: USGA
- Tour: LPGA Tour
- Format: Stroke play – 72 holes

Statistics
- Par: 74, 73 (Thu) (295 for 72 holes)
- Length: 6,456 yards (5,903 m)
- Prize fund: $6,000
- Winner's share: $1,500

Champion
- (United States) Kathy Cornelius
- 302 (+7), playoff

Location in the United States

The 1956 U.S. Women's Open was the eleventh U.S. Women's Open, held July 26–29 at Northland Country Club in Duluth, Minnesota. It was the fourth edition conducted by the United States Golf Association (USGA).

Kathy Cornelius won her only major championship in an 18-hole playoff over amateur Barbara McIntire by a score of 75 to 82.

Northland was designed by noted course architect Donald Ross.

== Final leaderboard ==
Saturday, July 28, 1956

Place	Player	Score	To par	Money ($)
T1	(United States) Kathy Cornelius	73-77-73-79=302	+7	Playoff
T1	(United States) Barbara McIntire (a)	75-79-77-71=302	+7	Playoff
T3	(United States) Patty Berg	78-75-76-74=303	+8	875
T3	(United States) Marlene Hagge	74-74-75-80=303	+8	875
5	(United States) Joyce Ziske	76-74-79-76=305	+10	600
6	(United States) Marilynn Smith	76-78-78-74=306	+11	500
T7	(United States) Betty Jameson	77-75-78-77=307	+12	350
T7	(United States) Louise Suggs	76-73-80-78=307	+12	350
9	(United States) Mickey Wright	77-80-78-73=308	+13	250
T10	(Uruguay) Fay Crocker	82-80-76-71=309	+14	200
T10	(United States) Mary Lena Faulk	75-75-81-78=309	+14	200

=== Playoff ===
Sunday, July 29, 1956

Place	Player	Score	To par	Money ($)
1	(United States) Kathy Cornelius	40-35=75	+1	1,500
2	(United States) Barbara McIntire (a)	41-41=82	+8	0
