= List of LPGA major championship winning golfers =

This article lists all 146 women who have won major championships on the LPGA Tour, both past and present. They are listed in order of the number of victories, with updates reflecting the 2026 season.

- Winning span indicates the years from the player's first major win to the last.

Rank	Player	Country	Winning span	Total	Chevron C'ship	PGA C'ship	U.S. Open	British Open	du Maurier	Title- holders	Western Open	Evian C'ship
1	Patty Berg	United States	1937–1958	15	–	–	1	–	–	7	7	–
2	Mickey Wright	United States	1958–1966	13	–	4	4	–	–	2	3	–
3	Louise Suggs	United States	1946–1959	11	–	1	2	–	–	4	4	–
T4	Annika Sörenstam	Sweden	1995–2006	10	3	3	3	1	–	–	–	–
T4	Babe Zaharias	United States	1940–1954	10	–	–	3	–	–	3	4	–
6	Betsy Rawls	United States	1951–1969	8	–	2	4	–	–	–	2	–
T7	Juli Inkster	United States	1984–2002	7	2	2	2	–	1	–	–	–
T7	Karrie Webb	Australia	1999–2006	7	2	1	2	1	1	–	–	–
T7	Inbee Park	South Korea	2008–2015	7	1	3	2	1	–	–	–	–
T10	Pat Bradley	United States	1980–1986	6	1	1	1	–	3	–	–	–
T10	Betsy King	United States	1987–1997	6	3	1	2	–	–	–	–	–
T10	Patty Sheehan	United States	1983–1996	6	1	3	2	–	–	–	–	–
T10	Kathy Whitworth	United States	1965–1975	6	–	3	–	–	–	2	1	–
T14	Amy Alcott	United States	1979–1991	5	3	–	1	–	1	–	–	–
T14	Se Ri Pak	South Korea	1998–2006	5	–	3	1	1	–	–	–	–
T14	Yani Tseng	Taiwan	2008–2011	5	1	2	–	2	–	–	–	–
T17	Susie Berning	United States	1965–1973	4	–	–	3	–	–	–	1	–
T17	Donna Caponi	United States	1969–1981	4	–	2	2	–	–	–	–	–
T17	Laura Davies	England	1987–1996	4	–	2	1	–	1	–	–	–
T17	Sandra Haynie	United States	1965–1982	4	–	2	1	–	1	–	–	–
T17	Meg Mallon	United States	1991–2004	4	–	1	2	–	1	–	–	–
T17	Hollis Stacy	United States	1977–1984	4	–	–	3	–	1	–	–	–
T17	Nelly Korda	United States	2021–2026	4	2	1	1	–	–	–	–	–
T24	Beverly Hanson	United States	1955–1958	3	–	1	–	–	–	1	1	–
T24	Chun In-gee	South Korea	2015–2022	3	–	1	1	–	–	–	–	1
T24	Betty Jameson	United States	1942–1954	3	–	–	1	–	–	–	2	–
T24	Lydia Ko	New Zealand	2015–2024	3	1	–	–	1	–	–	–	1
T24	Minjee Lee	Australia	2021–2025	3	–	1	1	–	–	–	–	1
T24	Nancy Lopez	United States	1978–1989	3	–	3	–	–	–	–	–	–
T24	Mary Mills	United States	1963–1973	3	–	2	1	–	–	–	–	–
T24	Anna Nordqvist	Sweden	2009–2021	3	–	1	–	1	–	–	–	1
T24	Jan Stephenson	Australia	1981–1983	3	–	1	1	–	1	–	–	–
T32	June Beebe	United States	1931–1933	2	–	–	–	–	–	–	2	–
T32	Brandie Burton	United States	1993–1998	2	–	–	–	–	2	–	–	–
T32	JoAnne Carner	United States	1971–1976	2	–	–	2	–	–	–	–	–
T32	Fay Crocker	Uruguay	1955–1960	2	–	–	1	–	–	1	–	–
T32	Jane Geddes	United States	1986–1987	2	–	1	1	–	–	–	–	–
T32	Helen Hicks	United States	1937–1940	2	–	–	–	–	–	1	1	–
T32	Brooke Henderson	Canada	2016–2022	2	–	1	–	–	–	–	–	1
T32	Opal Hill	United States	1935–1936	2	–	–	–	–	–	–	2	–
T32	Ariya Jutanugarn	Thailand	2016–2018	2	–	–	1	1	–	–	–	–
T32	Cristie Kerr	United States	2007–2010	2	–	1	1	–	–	–	–	–
T32	Dorothy Kirby	United States	1941–1942	2	–	–	–	–	–	2	–	–
T32	Ko Jin-young	South Korea	2019	2	1	–	–	–		–	–	1
T32	Stacy Lewis	United States	2011–2013	2	1	–	–	1	–	–	–	–
T32	Brittany Lincicome	United States	2009–2015	2	2	–	–	–	–	–	–	–
T32	Sally Little	South Africa; United States	1980–1988	2	–	1	–	–	1	–	–	–
T32	Carol Mann	United States	1964–1965	2	–	–	1	–	–	–	1	–
T32	Lorena Ochoa	Mexico	2007–2008	2	1	–	–	1	–	–	–	–
T32	Sandra Palmer	United States	1972–1975	2	–	–	1	–	–	1	–	–
T32	Park Sung-hyun	South Korea	2017–2018	2	–	1	1	–	–	–	–	–
T32	Dottie Pepper	United States	1992–1999	2	2	–	–	–	–	–	–	–
T32	Suzann Pettersen	Norway	2007–2013	2	–	1	–	–	–	–	–	1
T32	Yuka Saso	Japan (Note: Saso played under the Philippines flag for her first U.S. Open win.)	2021–2024	2	–	–	2	–	–	–	–	–
T32	Ryu So-yeon	South Korea	2011–2017	2	1	–	1	–	–	–	–	–
T32	Jiyai Shin	South Korea	2008–2012	2	–	–	–	2	–	–	–	–
T32	Marilynn Smith	United States	1963–1964	2	–	–	–	–	–	2	–	–
T32	Sherri Steinhauer	United States	1992–2006	2	–	–	–	1	1	–	–	–
T32	Lilia Vu	United States	2023	2	1	–	–	1	–	–	–	–
T32	Ryu Hae-ran	South Korea	2026	2	–	1	–	–	–	–	–	1
T61	Kathy Ahern	United States	1972	1	–	1	–	–	–	–	–	–
T61	Helen Alfredsson	Sweden	1993	1	1	–	–	–	–	–	–	–
T61	Janet Anderson	United States	1982	1	–	–	1	–	–	–	–	–
T61	Donna Andrews	United States	1994	1	1	–	–	–	–	–	–	–
T61	Jody Anschutz	United States	1986	1	–	–	–	–	1	–	–	–
T61	Kathy Baker	United States	1985	1	–	–	1	–	–	–	–	–
T61	Bea Barrett	United States	1938	1	–	–	–	–	–	–	1	–
T61	Céline Boutier	France	2023	1	–	–	–	–	–	–	–	1
T61	Nanci Bowen	United States	1995	1	1	–	–	–	–	–	–	–
T61	Jerilyn Britz	United States	1979	1	–	–	1	–	–	–	–	–
T61	Ashleigh Buhai	South Africa	2022	1	–	–	–	1	–	–	–	–
T61	Betty Burfeindt	United States	1976	1	–	1	–	–	–	–	–	–
T61	Na Yeon Choi	South Korea	2012	1	–	–	1	–	–	–	–	–
T61	Kathy Cornelius	United States	1956	1	–	–	1	–	–	–	–	–
T61	Allisen Corpuz	United States	2023	1	–	–	1	–	–	–	–	–
T61	Paula Creamer	United States	2010	1	–	–	1	–	–	–	–	–
T61	Beth Daniel	United States	1990	1	–	1	–	–	–	–	–	–
T61	Helen Dettweiler	United States	1939	1	–	–	–	–	–	–	1	–
T61	Gloria Ehret	United States	1966	1	–	1	–	–	–	–	–	–
T61	Shirley Englehorn	United States	1970	1	–	1	–	–	–	–	–	–
T61	Mary Lena Faulk	United States	1961	1	–	–	–	–	–	–	1	–
T61	Shanshan Feng	China	2012	1	–	1	–	–	–	–	–	–
T61	Ayaka Furue	Japan	2024	1	–	–	–	–	–	–	–	1
T61	Hannah Green	Australia	2019	1	–	1	–	–	–	–	–	–
T61	Tammie Green	United States	1989	1	–	–	–	–	1	–	–	–
T61	Georgia Hall	England	2018	1	–	–	–	1	–	–	–	–
T61	Marlene Hagge	United States	1956	1	–	1	–	–	–	–	–	–
T61	Hisako Higuchi	Japan	1977	1	–	1	–	–	–	–	–	–
T61	Pat Hurst	United States	1988	1	1	–	–	–	–	–	–	–
T61	Jeong Jang	South Korea	2005	1	–	–	–	1	–	–	–	–
T61	Eun-Hee Ji	South Korea	2009	1	–	–	1	–	–	–	–	–
T61	Christa Johnson	United States	1997	1	–	1	–	–	–	–	–	–
T61	Cathy Johnston-Forbes	United States	1990	1	–	–	–	–	1	–	–	–
T61	Danielle Kang	United States	2017	1	–	1	–	–	–	–	–	–
T61	Birdie Kim	South Korea	2005	1	–	–	1	–	–	–	–	–
T61	Kim A-lim	South Korea	2020	1	–	–	1	–	–	–	–	–
T61	Kim Hyo-joo	South Korea	2014	1	–	–	–	–	–	–	–	1
T61	In-Kyung Kim	South Korea	2017	1	–	–	–	1	–	–	–	–
T61	Kim Sei-young	South Korea	2020	1	–	1	–	–	–	–	–	–
T61	Judy Kimball	United States	1962	1	–	1	–	–	–	–	–	–
T61	Peggy Kirk Bell	United States	1949	1	–	–	–	–	–	1	–	–
T61	Jennifer Kupcho	United States	2022	1	1	–	–	–	–	–	–	–
T61	Catherine Lacoste	France	1967	1	–	–	1	–	–	–	–	–
T61	Brittany Lang	United States	2016	1	–	–	1	–	–	–	–	–
T61	Lee Jeong-eun	South Korea	2019	1	–	–	1	–	–	–	–	–
T61	Mirim Lee	South Korea	2020	1	1	–	–	–	–	–	–	–
T61	Jenny Lidback	Peru; Sweden	1995	1	–	–	–	–	1	–	–	–
T61	Pernilla Lindberg	Sweden	2018	1	1	–	–	–	–	–	–	–
T61	Murle Lindstrom	United States	1962	1	–	–	1	–	–	–	–	–
T61	Hilary Lunke	United States	2003	1	–	–	1	–	–	–	–	–
T61	Mo Martin	United States	2014	1	–	–	–	1	–	–	–	–
T61	Catriona Matthew	Scotland	2009	1	–	–	–	1	–	–	–	–
T61	Marian McDougall	United States	1934	1	–	–	–	–	–	–	1	–
T61	Lauri Merten	United States	1993	1	–	–	1	–	–	–	–	–
T61	Patricia Meunier-Lebouc	France	2003	1	1	–	–	–	–	–	–	–
T61	Lucia Mida	United States	1930	1	–	–	–	–	–	–	1	–
T61	Alice Miller	United States	1985	1	1	–	–	–	–	–	–	–
T61	Martha Nause	United States	1994	1	–	–	–	–	1	–	–	–
T61	Liselotte Neumann	Sweden	1988	1	–	–	1	–	–	–	–	–
T61	Alison Nicholas	England	1997	1	–	–	1	–	–	–	–	–
T61	Pat O'Sullivan	United States	1951	1	–	–	–	–	–	1	–	–
T61	Grace Park	South Korea	2004	1	1	–	–	–	–	–	–	–
T61	Sophia Popov	Germany	2020	1	–	–	–	1	–	–	–	–
T61	Sandra Post	Canada	1968	1	–	1	–	–	–	–	–	–
T61	Morgan Pressel	United States	2007	1	1	–	–	–	–	–	–	–
T61	Kelly Robbins	United States	1995	1	–	1	–	–	–	–	–	–
T61	Mao Saigo	Japan	2025	1	1	–	–	–	–	–	–	–
T61	Nancy Scranton	United States	1991	1	–	–	–	–	1	–	–	–
T61	Hinako Shibuno	Japan	2019	1	–	–	–	1		–	–	–
T61	Sandra Spuzich	United States	1966	1	–	–	1	–	–	–	–	–
T61	Angela Stanford	United States	2018	1	–	–	–	–	–	–	–	1
T61	Maja Stark	Sweden	2025	1	–	–	1	–	–	–	–	
T61	Karen Stupples	England	2004	1	–	–	–	1	–	–	–	–
T61	Patty Tavatanakit	Thailand	2021	1	1	–	–	–	–	–	–	–
T61	Lexi Thompson	United States	2014	1	1	–	–	–	–	–	–	–
T61	Sherri Turner	United States	1988	1	–	1	–	–	–	–	–	–
T61	Colleen Walker	United States	1997	1	–	–	–	–	1	–	–	–
T61	Jane Weiller	United States	1932	1	–	–	–	–	–	–	1	–
T61	Michelle Wie	United States	2014	1	–	–	1	–	–	–	–	–
T61	Amy Yang	South Korea	2024	1	–	1	–	–	–	–	–	–
T61	Yin Ruoning	China	2023	1	–	1	–	–	–	–	–	–
T61	Sun-Young Yoo	South Korea	2012	1	1	–	–	–	–	–	–	–
T61	Joyce Ziske	United States	1960	1	–	–	–	–	–	–	1	–
T61	Grace Kim	Australia	2025	1	–	–	–	–	–	–	–	1
T61	Miyū Yamashita	Japan	2025	1	–	–	–	1	–	–	–	–
T61	Shiho Kuwaki	Japan	2026	1	–	–	–	1	–	–	–	–

== By country ==
Country	Chevron	Women's PGA	U.S. Open	British Open	Evian	du Maurier	Titleholders	Western Open	Total
United States	25	42	54	4	1	18	27	38	209
South Korea	6	11	11	6	4	0	0	0	38
Sweden	5	4	5	2	1	1	0	0	18
Australia	2	4	4	1	2	2	0	0	15
England	0	2	2	2	0	1	0	0	7
Japan	1	1	1	3	1	0	0	0	7
Taiwan	1	2	0	2	0	0	0	0	5
Canada	0	2	0	0	1	0	0	0	3
France	1	0	1	0	1	0	0	0	3
Thailand	1	0	1	1	0	0	0	0	3
New Zealand	1	0	0	1	1	0	0	0	3
Mexico	1	0	0	1	0	0	0	0	2
Norway	0	1	0	0	1	0	0	0	2
Uruguay	0	0	1	0	0	0	1	0	2
China	0	2	0	0	0	0	0	0	2
Germany	0	0	0	1	0	0	0	0	1
Philippines	0	0	1	0	0	0	0	0	1
Scotland	0	0	0	1	0	0	0	0	1
South Africa	0	0	0	1	0	0	0	0	1

== See also ==
- Chronological list of LPGA major golf champions
- List of men's major championships winning golfers
