= 1957 U.S. Women's Open =

Coordinates: 40.958°N 73.754°W

Tournament information
- Dates: June 27–29, 1957
- Location: Mamaroneck, New York
- Courses: Winged Foot Golf Club, East Course
- Organized by: USGA
- Tour: LPGA Tour
- Format: Stroke play – 72 holes

Statistics
- Par: 73
- Length: 6,246 yards (5,711 m)
- Field: 98: 33 pros, 65 amateurs
- Cut: 168 (+22)
- Prize fund: $7,200
- Winner's share: $1,800

Champion
- (United States) Betsy Rawls
- 299 (+7)

Location in the United States

The 1957 U.S. Women's Open was the twelfth U.S. Women's Open, held June 27–29 at the East Course of Winged Foot Golf Club in Mamaroneck, New York. It was the fifth conducted by the United States Golf Association (USGA).

Betsy Rawls won when the apparent champion, Jackie Pung at 6-over par 298, was disqualified for signing an incorrect scorecard. Her score was kept by playing partner Betty Jameson, the 1947 champion, who had marked a par score of five for Pung on the fourth hole, instead of a bogey six. Pung made exactly the same error on Jameson's card, who was also disqualified. It was the fourth of eight major championships for Rawls and the third of four U.S. Women's Opens.

The championship returned to the East Course in 1972; the adjacent West Course has hosted many major championships.

== Final leaderboard ==
Saturday, June 29, 1957

Place	Player	Score	To par	Money ($)
1	(United States) Betsy Rawls	74-74-75-76=299	+7	1,800
2	(United States) Patty Berg	80-77-73-75=305	+13	1,200
T3	(United States) Betty Hicks	75-77-76-80=308	+16	810
T3	(United States) Louise Suggs	76-81-75-76=308	+16	810
5	(United States) Betty Dodd	74-78-76-82=310	+18	600
T6	(United States) Alice Bauer	72-73-87-79=311	+19	380
T6	(United States) Marlene Hagge	72-81-81-77=311	+19	380
T6	(United States) Jo Ann Prentice	75-78-84-74=311	+19	380
T9	(Uruguay) Fay Crocker	78-81-75-78=312	+20	240
T9	(United States) Beverly Hanson	78-76-79-79=312	+20	240

- Jackie Pung's score was 78-75-73-72=298 (+6)
