= 1958 U.S. Women's Open =

Coordinates: 42.597°N 83.297°W

Tournament information
- Dates: June 26–28, 1958
- Location: Bloomfield Hills, Michigan
- Course: Forest Lake Country Club
- Organized by: USGA
- Tour: LPGA Tour
- Format: Stroke play – 72 holes

Statistics
- Par: 73
- Length: 6,240 yards (5,706 m)
- Prize fund: $7,200
- Winner's share: $1,800

Champion
- (United States) Mickey Wright
- 290 (−2)

Location in the United States
Location in Michigan

The 1958 U.S. Women's Open was the 13th U.S. Women's Open, held June 26–28 at Forest Lake Country Club in Bloomfield Hills, Michigan, a suburb northwest of Detroit. It was the sixth edition conducted by the United States Golf Association (USGA).

Mickey Wright, age 23, won the first of her four U.S. Women's Open titles, five strokes ahead of runner-up Louise Suggs, a two-time champion. It was the second of 13 major championships for Wright, who led wire-to-wire and entered the final round with a seven stroke lead.

This was the second major held at Forest Lake, which hosted the LPGA Championship two years earlier in 1956.

== Final leaderboard ==
Saturday, June 28, 1958

Place	Player	Score	To par	Money ($)
1	(United States) Mickey Wright	74-72-70-74=290	−2	1,800
2	(United States) Louise Suggs	75-74-75-71=295	+3	1,200
3	(Uruguay) Fay Crocker	79-68-76-74=297	+5	800
4	(United States) Alice Bauer	76-77-75-72=300	+8	650
5	(United States) Betty Jameson	75-80-74-74=303	+11	500
6	(United States) Betsy Rawls	79-82-73-70=304	+12	400
T7	(United States) Jackie Pung	75-77-77-76=305	+13	325
T7	(United States) Wiffi Smith	81-76-73-75=305	+13	325
T9	(United States) Patty Berg	78-78-77-73=306	+14	250
T9	(United States) Vonnie Colby	77-76-75-78=306	+14	250
