= 1960 Women's Western Open =

Golf tournament

Tournament information
- Dates: June 23–26, 1960
- Location: Chicago, Illinois; 41°44′05″N 87°41′05″W
- Course: Beverly Country Club
- Tour: LPGA Tour
- Format: 72 holes, stroke play

Statistics
- Par: 73
- Length: 6,412 yards (5,863 m)
- Field: 135 players, 37 after cut
- Cut: 165 (+19)
- Prize fund: $7,500
- Winner's share: $1,313

Champion
- Joyce Ziske
- 301 (+9)
- Location within the United States Location within Illinois

The 1960 Women's Western Open was contested from June 23–26 at Beverly Country Club in Chicago, Illinois. It was the 31st edition of the Women's Western Open.

This event was won by Joyce Ziske on the second hole of a sudden-death playoff with Barbara Romack.

== Final leaderboard ==
Place	Player	Score	To par	Money ($)
1	(United States) Joyce Ziske	78-75-76-72=301	+9	1,313
2	(United States) Barbara Romack	77-77-72-75=301	+9	1,012
T3	(United States) Mary Lena Faulk	75-77-74-79=305	+13	660
T3	(United States) Louise Suggs	74-81-78-72=305	+13	660
T3	(United States) Mickey Wright	78-77-76-74=305	+13	660
T6	(United States) Jackie Pung	78-77-76-75=306	+14	431
T6	(United States) Betsy Rawls	76-73-76-81=306	+14	431
8	(Uruguay) Fay Crocker	74-79-80-75=308	+16	356
9	(United States) Ruth Jessen	79-76-78-77=310	+18	300
10	(United States) Phyllis Preuss (a)	79-77-77-78=311	+19	0
