= 1958 LPGA Championship =

Coordinates: 40.450°N 79.845°W

Tournament information
- Dates: June 5–8, 1958
- Location: Blackridge, Pennsylvania
- Course: Churchill Valley Country Club
- Tour: LPGA Tour
- Format: Stroke play – 72 holes

Statistics
- Par: 70
- Length: 6,025 yards (5,509 m)
- Field: 27 players
- Cut: none
- Prize fund: $7,500
- Winner's share: $1,247

Champion
- (United States) Mickey Wright
- 288 (+8)

Location in the United States
Location in Pennsylvania

The 1958 LPGA Championship was the fourth LPGA Championship, held June 5–8 at Churchill Valley Country Club in Blackridge, Pennsylvania, a suburb east of Pittsburgh.

Mickey Wright, age 23, won the first of her four LPGA Championships, six strokes ahead of runner-up Fay Crocker. It was the first of Wright's thirteen major titles. Defending champion Louise Suggs finished ten strokes back, in a tie for ninth. The field consisted of 27 professionals; a concurrent event for amateurs was also held.

The LPGA Championship was played for a second straight year at Churchill Valley, which hosted its third major the following year, the U.S. Women's Open in 1959. The club closed in 2013.

== Final leaderboard ==
Sunday, June 8, 1958

| Place | Player | Score | To par | Money ($) |
|---|---|---|---|---|
| 1 | (United States) Mickey Wright | 69-69-76-74=288 | +8 | 1,247 |
| 2 | (Uruguay) Fay Crocker | 72-75-71-79=294 | +14 | 961 |
| T3 | (United States) Peggy Kirk Bell | 75-75-74-71=295 | +15 | 581 |
| T3 | (United States) Jackie Pung | 76-76-76-67=295 | +15 | 581 |
| T3 | (United States) Joyce Ziske | 76-74-75-70=295 | +15 | 581 |
| T3 | (United States) Betty Jameson | 75-72-74-74=295 | | |
| 7 | (United States) Kathy Cornelius | 71-75-75-75=296 | +16 | 374 |
| 8 | (United States) Mary Lena Faulk | 74-74-74-75=297 | +17 | 338 |
| T9 | (United States) Ruth Jessen | 74-75-76-73=298 | +18 | 255 |
| T9 | (United States) Marilynn Smith | 71-77-72-78=298 | +18 | 255 |
| T9 | (United States) Louise Suggs | 76-74-72-76=298 | +18 | 255 |
