= Corpus Christi Tournament =

Golf tournament formerly on the LPGA Tour

The Corpus Christi Tournament was a golf tournament on the LPGA Tour, played only in 1952. It was played in Corpus Christi, Texas. Betty Jameson won the event.
