= Golden Triangle Festival =

1959 women's golf tournament

The Golden Triangle Festival was a golf tournament on the LPGA Tour, played only in 1959. It was played at the PGA National Golf Club in Dunedin, Florida. Beverly Hanson won the event.
