= 1961 Women's Western Open =

Golf tournament

Coordinates: 36.0957°N 86.8635°W

Tournament information
- Dates: June 1–4, 1961
- Location: Nashville, Tennessee
- Course: Belle Meade Country Club
- Tour: LPGA Tour
- Format: 72 holes, stroke play

Statistics
- Par: 75
- Length: 6,615 yards (6,049 m)
- Field: 87 players, 32 after cut
- Cut: 167 (+17)
- Prize fund: $7,500
- Winner's share: $1,313

Champion
- Mary Lena Faulk
- 290 (−10)
- Location within the United States Location within Tennessee

The 1961 Women's Western Open was contested from June 1–4 at Belle Meade Country Club in Nashville, Tennessee. It was the 32nd edition of the Women's Western Open.

This event was won by Mary Lena Faulk.

== Final leaderboard ==
| Place | Player | Score | To par | Money ($) |
|---|---|---|---|---|
| 1 | (United States) Mary Lena Faulk | 75-75-67-73=290 | −10 | 1,313 |
| 2 | (United States) Betsy Rawls | 69-76-75-76=296 | −4 | 1,012 |
| 3 | (United States) Mickey Wright | 77-74-72-75=298 | −2 | 800 |
| 4 | (United States) Louise Suggs | 77-76-74-72=299 | −1 | 637 |
| 5 | (United States) Marilynn Smith | 77-73-73-78=301 | +1 | 544 |
| 6 | (United States) Kathy Cornelius | 77-78-74-76=305 | +5 | 468 |
| 7 | (United States) Marlene Bauer Hagge | 75-78-80-74=307 | +7 | 394 |
| 8 | (United States) Barbara Romack | 77-76-75-80=308 | +8 | 356 |
| 9 | (United States) Shirley Englehorn | 73-83-74-80=310 | +10 | 300 |
| T10 | (United States) Polly Riley (a) | 78-80-75-79=312 | +12 | 0 |
| T10 | (United States) Peggy Kirk Bell | 78-77-75-82=312 | +12 | 263 |
