= Bakersfield Open (LPGA Tour) =

Golf tournament

The Bakersfield Open was a golf tournament on the LPGA Tour from 1952 to 1953. It was played in Bakersfield, California

== Winners ==
- 1953 Louise Suggs
- 1952 Marlene Hagge, Betty Jameson, Betsy Rawls, Babe Zaharias (tie)
