= Howard Johnson Invitational =

Golf tournament formerly on the LPGA Tour

The Howard Johnson Invitational was a golf tournament on the LPGA Tour, played only in 1959. It was played at the Mid Pines Golf Club in Southern Pines, North Carolina. Joyce Ziske won the event.
