= Lake Worth =

Lake Worth is the name of several places in the United States:

- Lake Worth Beach, Florida, a city
- Lake Worth Lagoon, a lagoon in Florida
- Lake Worth, Texas, a town in Texas
- Lake Worth (Texas), a lake in Texas

It may also refer to:

- Lake Worth Open, a former golf tournament
- Wörthsee, a glacial lake in the Starnberg district of Bavaria, Germany
- Wörthersee, an alpine lake in the southern Austrian state of Carinthia
