= Wichita Open (LPGA Tour) =

Golf tournament formerly on the LPGA Tour

The Wichita Open was a golf tournament on the LPGA Tour, played only in 1954. It was played at the Wichita Country Club in Wichita, Kansas. Beverly Hanson won the event.
