= White Mountain Open =

Golf tournament formerly on the LPGA Tour

The White Mountain Open was a golf tournament on the LPGA Tour, played only in 1955. It was played in Bethlehem, New Hampshire at three different courses: Bethlehem Country Club, Maplewood Country Club, and Mount Washington Golf Club. Betty Jameson won the event.
