= Links Invitation Open =

Golf tournament formerly on the LPGA Tour

The Links Invitation Open was a golf tournament on the LPGA Tour, played only in 1959. It was played at the Continental Colony Club in Atlanta, Georgia. Beverly Hanson won the event.
