= 1958 Titleholders Championship =

Golf tournament in Augusta, Georgia, US

The 1958 Titleholders Championship was contested from March 13–16 at Augusta Country Club. It was the 19th edition of the Titleholders Championship.

This event was won by Beverly Hanson.

== Final leaderboard ==
Place	Player	Score	To par	Money ($)
1	(United States) Beverly Hanson	72-80-73-74=299	+11	1,000
2	(United States) Betty Dodd	74-80-75-75=304	+16	750
3	(United States) Patty Berg	73-79-78-77=307	+19	550
4	(United States) Marlene Hagge	74-75-82-77=308	+20	450
5	(Uruguay) Fay Crocker	74-76-78-84=312	+24	350
6	(United States) Mickey Wright	76-81-79-77=313	+25	325
7	(United States) Kathy Cornelius	77-80-76-81=314	+26	275
T8	(United States) Bonnie Randolph	78-84-78-75=315	+27	225
T8	(United States) Marilynn Smith	77-82-81-75=315	+27	225
T8	(United States) Louise Suggs	76-86-74-79=315	+27	225
