= Battle Creek Open =

Golf tournament in 1955

The Battle Creek Open was a golf tournament on the LPGA Tour, played only in 1955. It was played at the Battle Creek Country Club in Battle Creek, Michigan. Beverly Hanson won the event.
