= Hoosier Open =

Golf tournament formerly on the LPGA Tour

The Hoosier Open was a golf tournament on the LPGA Tour from 1959 to 1960. It was played at the Fort Wayne Country Club in Fort Wayne, Indiana. Only the 1959 event was an official event.

== Winners ==
Hoosier Celebrity

- 1960 Joyce Ziske

Hoosier Open

- 1959 Marlene Hagge
