= Royal Crown Open =

Golf tournament

The Royal Crown Open was a golf tournament on the LPGA Tour from 1959 to 1961. It was played at the Country Club of Columbus in Columbus, Georgia.

== Winners ==
Columbus Open

- 1961 Mickey Wright

Royal Crown Open

- 1960 Wiffi Smith
- 1959 Betsy Rawls
