= Syracuse Open =

Golf tournament formerly on the LPGA Tour

Tournament information
- Location: Syracuse, New York
- Established: 1956
- Course: Drumlins Country Club
- Tour: LPGA Tour
- Final year: 1956

Final champion
- Joyce Ziske

The Syracuse Open was a golf tournament on the LPGA Tour, played only in 1956. It was played at the Drumlins Country Club in Syracuse, New York. Joyce Ziske won the event.
