= 1942 Women's Western Open =

Golf tournament in Addison, Illinois, US

Tournament information
- Dates: June 22–27, 1942
- Location: Addison, Illinois; 41.9452°N 87.9795°W
- Course: Elmhurst Country Club
- Format: Stroke play/match play

Statistics
- Par: 76
- Field: 120 players, 32 to match play
- Cut: 89 (+13)

Champion
- Betty Jameson
- def. Phyllis Otto, 9 and 7
- Location within the United States Location within Illinois

The 1942 Women's Western Open was a golf competition held at Elmhurst Country Club in Addison, Illinois from June 22–27. It was the 13th edition of the Women's Western Open.

The field of 120 golfers played an 18-hole qualifying round to determine the 32 players advancing to match play. Eleanor Dudley earned medalist honors with a qualifying round of 76 (E). Match play was over 18 holes for each round except the 36-hole final. All 32 players advancing to match play were amateurs, the last time this would happen.

Betty Jameson won the championship in match play competition by defeating Phyllis Otto in the final match, 9 and 7.

== Final 16 bracket ==
Round of 16; June 24
Marjorie Row	3&2
Katherine Mayer
Virginia Ingram	4&3
Lucile Mann
Phyllis Otto	1up
Georgia Tainter
Sally Sessions	2up
Mary Wilder
Dorothy Kirby	7&5
Dorothy Ellis
Jeanne Cline	1up
Betty Brown
Betty Jameson	6&5
Mary Agnes Wall
Dorothy Foster	5&3
Virginia Wilson Dennehy

Quarterfinals; June 25
Marjorie Row	2&1
Virginia Ingram
Phyllis Otto	3&2
Sally Sessions
Dorothy Kirby
Jeanne Cline	2&1
Betty Jameson	2up
Dorothy Foster

Semifinals; June 26
Marjorie Row
Phyllis Otto	1up
Jeanne Cline
Betty Jameson	4&3

Finals; June 27
Phyllis Otto
Betty Jameson	9&7
