= Lana Lawless =

American golfer

Lana Lawless (born in 1953) is a professional golfer.

Lawless is a transgender woman and underwent gender reassignment surgery in 2005 before playing golf professionally. She became a professional title-holding golfer and received recognition for filing a lawsuit against the Ladies Professional Golf Association (LPGA) in 2010 for her right to compete as a woman in the women's long-drive championship.

== Career ==
Before transitioning to female and changing her name to Lana Lawless, she was a gang unit police officer for the city of Rialto, California. Before transitioning, she played golf for 21 years at a private golf club; in 2006, after her gender reassignment, she decided to compete professionally. In 2007, Lawless competed in her first world championship, and returned in 2008 where she won the championship in long-drive golf.^{[4]}

In 2010, Lawless filed a lawsuit against the LPGA for her right to compete as a woman in the world championship. The LPGA had a requirement that athletes must be "female at birth" in order to compete. As a transgender athlete, this meant she would have been ineligible to compete. Lawless argued that this requirement violated California's civil rights law and that transsexual competitors should be allowed to compete as the gender that they identify with. She not only sued the LPGA but also sued Long Drivers of America, two of their sponsors and LPGA's sponsors. Ultimately, Lawless won the lawsuit, and as a result the LPGA reviewed its requirement of having to be born female in order to compete and removed it.

== Personal life ==
Although Lawless is open about being male-to-female transgender, she chooses not to discuss her former name. She explains that she has always been Lana Lawless deep inside. Before her gender reassignment, Lawless had been married but did not have biological children.

== See also ==
- Bobbi Lancaster, a trans woman who competed in the LPGA Qualifying Tournament in 2013
