= Bonnie Randolph =

American professional golfer (born 1927)

Personal information
- Full name: Bonnie Randolph Hoffman
- Nationality: United States
- Born: June 5, 1927 (age 99)

Career
- Sport: Golf
- College: Ohio State University
- Turned professional: 1953
- Former tour: LPGA Tour (1953–1963)
- Professional wins: 1

Number of wins by tour
- LPGA Tour: 1

Best results in LPGA major championships
- Titleholders C'ship: T8: 1958
- Women's PGA C'ship: T6: 1959
- U.S. Women's Open: 12th: 1952

Bonnie Randolph Hoffman (born June 5, 1927) was an American professional golfer who played on the LPGA Tour. She played under both Bonnie Randolph and Bonnie Randolph Hoffman.

== Career ==
Randolph won once on the LPGA Tour in 1958.

== Professional wins (1) ==
=== LPGA Tour wins (1) ===
- 1958 Kansas City Open
