= Bobbi Lancaster =

Canadian transgender golfer

Bobbi Lancaster (born June 23, 1950) is a golfer, author, human rights advocate, motivational speaker and physician. She garnered international media attention in 2013 while attempting to qualify for the LPGA Tour as a transgender woman.

== Early life and medical career ==
Bobbi Lancaster was born in 1950 in Chatham, Ontario, Canada. Her family moved to Hamilton, Ontario, in 1960. Lancaster attended McMaster University, where she captained the men's varsity golf team to two OUAA championships.

She attended McMaster University Medical School, graduating with an M.D. degree in 1978. She established a family practice in Hamilton before moving to Phoenix, Arizona, in 1991. In Arizona, she served as a medical director for Advanced Health Care and Hospice of the Valley.

== Golf career ==
Lancaster graduated from Cathedral Boys High School in 1969.

Lancaster won the caddy championship at Hamilton Golf and C.C. aged 11. She also qualified for the Ontario Caddy Championship. During high school she captained the Cathedral Boys varsity team to multiple victories. She also won junior tournaments, interclub matches representing Chedoke Civic Golf Course and was victorious as a member of the CANUSA Games golf team. In her late teens and twenties, Lancaster won multiple club championships at Chedoke. She also qualified and competed in several Canadian and Ontario Amateur Championships as well as the Ontario Open, a professional event. Lancaster also captained the McMaster University Men's Varsity Golf Team to two OUAA Championships (1972 and 1974).

=== LPGA Tour qualification attempt ===
When Lancaster became a professional golfer and attempted to qualify for the LPGA Tour at sixty three years of age, her story garnered international media attention. It started after Paola Boivin (senior sports columnist for the Arizona Republic) received a complaint from a fan about how inappropriate it was to see her playing on the Cactus Tour. This resulted in a full-length feature about her golf dreams, her personal life and her work as a physician. The story was picked up nationally and Boivin was nominated for a Sports Emmy. Following that article, stories appeared in the Canadian newspapers, Huffington Post, USA Today, Good Morning America, Canadian Medical Post. Lancaster agreed to interviews with TMZ Sports, Channel 12 News, New Times weekly newspaper, McMaster Times Alumnae magazine, Echo magazine, Freedom for All Americans and The League of Fans. There was a documentary that appeared on national television produced by the Golf Channel (interview conducted by Jimmy Roberts).

== Advocacy ==
As a result of the media attention, Lancaster was asked to give educational and motivational speeches to various groups including students at the University of Kansas, Arizona State University, Chandler and Gilbert Community Colleges, Stanford School of Law and McMaster School of Medicine. She has also given speeches to Phoenix Valley Leadership, the Arizona Women Lawyers Convention in Tucson, the Performing Artists Medical Association International Symposium (NYC 2016). Lancaster was awarded the Human Rights Campaign 2015 Equality Award at a gala in Phoenix in 2015. She was elected to their national Board of Directors in 2016. Lancaster has participated in a White House Summit, at town hall meetings and has canvassed and phone-banked for pro-LGBTQ candidates. She has also partnered with One Community and One n Ten to advocate for transgender acceptance and equality and has lobbied on her own as a private citizen. Lancaster was also elected to Echo Magazine's Hall of Fame in 2015.

== Memoir ==
Lancaster wrote a memoir called The Red Light Runner and is looking for a publisher.

== See also ==
- Lana Lawless, transgender former police officer who sued the LPGA for the right to compete on the woman's circuits in 2010, leading to the change in regulations
