= Alice Bauer =

American professional golfer (1927–2002)

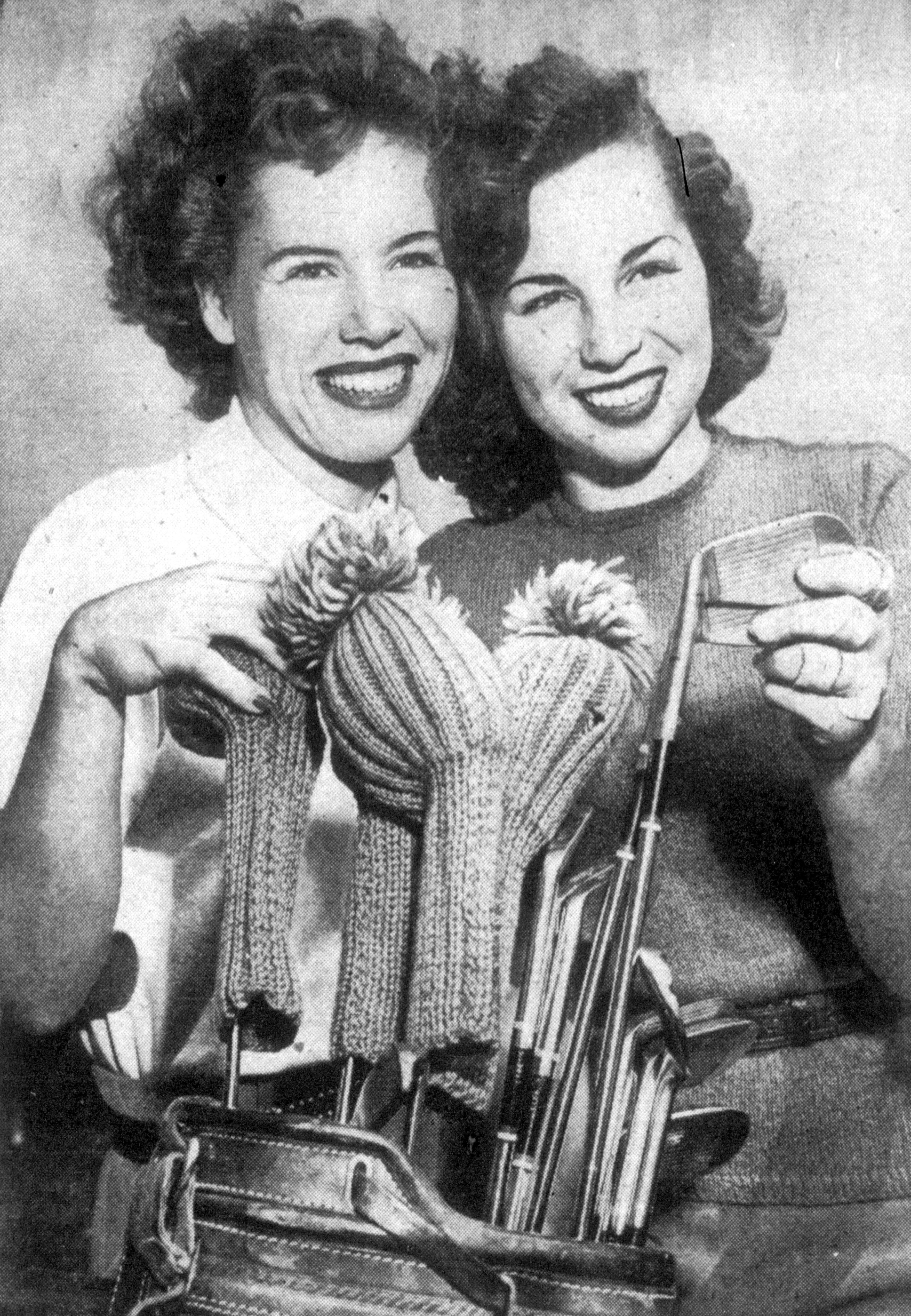
- Bauer (left) with her sister Marlene Hagge

Personal information
- Nationality: United States
- Born: October 6, 1927 Eureka, South Dakota, U.S.
- Died: March 6, 2002 (aged 74)
- Height: 5 ft 1 in (155 cm)

Career
- Sport: Golf
- Turned professional: 1950
- Former tour: LPGA Tour

Best results in LPGA major championships
- Western Open: 10th: 1956
- Titleholders C'ship: 10th: 1952
- Women's PGA C'ship: T6: 1956
- U.S. Women's Open: 4th: 1958

Achievements and awards
- World Golf Hall of Fame: 2024 (member page)

Alice Bauer (October 6, 1927 – March 6, 2002) was an American golfer. One of the founders of the LPGA, she played professionally and finished as high as 14th on the LPGA Tour money list, in 1956. Bauer had several top-10 finishes in major championships, including fourth place in the 1958 U.S. Women's Open.

== Biography ==
Bauer was born in Eureka, South Dakota and took up golf; her father was a course owner. Her sister, Marlene, had already been playing golf by the time Bauer was approximately 10 years old, and according to Marlene, Alice followed once she saw her sister gaining attention from locals. When she was 11 years old, Alice began devoting time to golf. At the age of 14, she won the South Dakota amateur championship in 1942, becoming the youngest winner of the event. After her family relocated to California, Bauer became the 1949 Southern Cal Amateur winner, and posted other victories in the state. By 1950, Bauer had played in the U.S. Women's Amateur three times, and had won an exhibition match against leading professional player Patty Berg.

The Bauer sisters were among the 13 founders of the LPGA that year. Alice Bauer did not win a tournament on the LPGA Tour; her closest brush with winning came in 1955 at the Heart of America Open. She reached a playoff with Marilynn Smith, only to lose on the fourth extra hole. By 1955, she had become a mother and curtailed her playing schedule, although she brought her daughter (the first of two children Bauer eventually had) with her to tour stops. She began doing so after her performance improved towards the end of the season with her daughter and parents present. Bauer had married Bob Hagge in 1952, but the pair divorced in 1955 and Hagge married Marlene.

Bauer's top finish on the tour's money list was 14th in 1956. That season, she ended the LPGA Championship in a tie for sixth place, 10 strokes behind her sister, who won the tournament in a playoff. The 1956 Women's Western Open saw Bauer finish in 10th place. At the 1957 U.S. Women's Open, Bauer held a three-stroke lead halfway through the tournament, but finished in a tie for sixth after rounds of 87 and 79. After the death of her father in 1958, she rarely played on the tour. However, she managed to better her U.S. Women's Open finish from the previous year with a fourth-place result in the 1958 event.

In describing Bauer's swing, Marilynn Smith remarked that "her backswing made John Daly's look short." However, despite a lack of height at 5'1", Bauer was one of the longest hitters on the LPGA Tour during her career.

The Bauer sisters garnered media recognition for their appearance. The pair often wore short skirts that emphasized their looks; a 1953 trip to Australia led to controversy, as females wearing shorts on the course was "simply not done here", according to the local press. Fellow LPGA Tour player Berg said that the Bauers were popular among spectators: "They were cute, they were fun, and the people liked them."

Bauer lived in Benson, Arizona for an extended period after her playing career. She was diagnosed with colon cancer in 1996 and died in 2002. The South Dakota Sports Hall of Fame has inducted Bauer.

On March 8, 2023, the seven founding LPGA members not inducted to the World Golf Hall of Fame, which included Bauer, were jointly named to the Class of 2024.
