= United Voluntary Services Open =

Golf tournament formerly on the LPGA Tour

The United Voluntary Services Open was a golf tournament on the LPGA Tour, played only in 1957. It was played at the Presidio Golf Club in San Francisco, California. Wiffi Smith won the event.
