= Wiffi Smith =

American professional golfer (1936–2026)

Personal information
- Full name: Margaret Chamberline Smith
- Nationality: United States
- Born: September 28, 1936 Redlands, California, U.S.
- Died: August 30, 2026 (aged 89) New Mexico, U.S.
- Height: 5 ft 6 in (1.68 m)

Career
- Sport: Golf
- Turned professional: 1957
- Former tour: LPGA Tour
- Professional wins: 8

Number of wins by tour
- LPGA Tour: 8

Best results in LPGA major championships
- Western Open: 2nd: 1957
- Titleholders C'ship: 3rd: 1959
- Women's PGA C'ship: 2nd: 1957
- U.S. Women's Open: 6th: 1960

Margaret Chamberline "Wiffi" Smith (September 28, 1936 – August 30, 2026) was an American professional golfer who played on the LPGA Tour.

== Early life and amateur career ==
Smith was born in Redlands, California, and moved to Mexico at the age of 11, where she learned to play golf.

She won several amateur events, including the 1954 U.S. Girls' Junior and the 1956 British Ladies Amateur. Smith played on the 1956 Curtis Cup team.

== Professional career ==
In 1957, Smith turned professional. She joined the LPGA Tour, winning eight times between 1957 and 1960.

Hand injuries led to Smith's early retirement from tour golf. She later worked as a golf instructor and trained horses for jumping and fox hunting.

Smith was inducted into the Michigan Golf Hall of Fame in 1987.

Smith died in 2026.

== Amateur wins ==
this list may be incomplete

- 1952 Women's Championship of Mexico
- 1954 U.S. Girls' Junior
- 1955 World Women's Amateur, North and South Women's Amateur
- 1956 British Ladies Amateur, French Women's Amateur, Trans-Mississippi Amateur

== Professional wins (8) ==
=== LPGA Tour wins (8) ===
- 1957 (2) Dallas Open, United Voluntary Services Open
- 1958 (1) Peach Blossom Open
- 1959 (2) MAGA Pro-Am, Betsy Rawls Open
- 1960 (3) Royal Crown Open, Betsy Rawls Peach Blossom Open, Waterloo Open

== Team appearances ==
Amateur

- Curtis Cup (representing the United States): 1956
