= 1956 Women's Western Open =

Golf tournament

Coordinates: 41.5518°N 93.6401°W

Tournament information
- Dates: June 28 – July 1, 1956
- Location: Des Moines, Iowa
- Course: Wakonda Country Club
- Tour: LPGA Tour
- Format: 72 holes, stroke play

Statistics
- Par: 76
- Length: 6,475 yards (5,921 m)
- Field: 129 players, 32 after cut
- Cut: 172 (+20)
- Prize fund: $5,000
- Winner's share: $1,000

Champion
- Beverly Hanson
- 304 (E)
- Location within the United States Location within Iowa

The 1956 Women's Western Open was contested from June 28 to July 1 at Wakonda Country Club in Des Moines, Iowa. It was the 27th edition of the Women's Western Open.

This event was won by Beverly Hanson.

== Final leaderboard ==
Place	Player	Score	To par	Money ($)
1	(United States) Beverly Hanson	75-81-72-76=304	E	1,000
2	(United States) Louise Suggs	72-78-79-79=308	+4	700
3	(United States) Mickey Wright	76-77-74-81=309	+5	600
T4	(United States) Patty Berg	75-80-80-76=311	+7	463
T4	(United States) Marlene Bauer Hagge	76-79-77-79=311	+7	463
T6	(United States) Ruth Jessen (a)	75-79-81-79=314	+10	0
T6	(United States) Anne Quast (a)	77-80-79-78=314	+10	0
T8	(United States) Marilynn Smith	80-79-80-78=317	+13	350
T8	(United States) Jackie Yates (a)	75-84-80-78=317	+13	0
10	(United States) Alice Bauer	76-79-82-82=319	+15	310
