= Craig Kessler =

American businessperson

Craig Kessler is an American businessperson and the 10th commissioner of the LPGA, a position he began in July 2025. Prior to that, he served as the chief operating officer for the PGA of America. He attended Georgetown University and earned an MBA from Harvard Business School. He has also held positions as CEO of Buff City Soap, COO of TopGolf, and operating partner at both KKR & Co. and Providence Equity.
