= Betty Dodd =

American professional golfer (1931–1993)

Personal information
- Full name: Elizabeth Dodd
- Nationality: United States
- Born: April 11, 1931 Portland, Oregon, U.S.
- Died: July 8, 1993 (aged 62) San Antonio, Texas, U.S.

Career
- Sport: Golf
- Status: Professional
- Former tour: LPGA Tour
- Professional wins: 3

Number of wins by tour
- LPGA Tour: 2
- Other: 1

Best results in LPGA major championships
- Titleholders C'ship: 2nd: 1958
- Women's PGA C'ship: T8: 1956
- U.S. Women's Open: 7th: 1957

Elizabeth Hobart Dodd (April 11, 1931 – July 8, 1993) was an American professional golfer. She played on the LPGA Tour.

== Early life and amateur career ==
In 1931, Dodd was born in Portland, Oregon to General Francis and Margaret Dodd. She began the game of golf at age of 11 in 1942. On her first 9 holes, she shot a 42. At age 16, she won her first tournament in Garmisch-Partenkirchen, Germany. Her father was in command of the lower area in southern Germany during this time.

After the war, the family settled in San Antonio and Dodd soon began dominating ladies amateur golf in San Antonio. At the age of 19, she won the San Antonio driving contest with a 310-yard drive.

== Professional career ==
In the early 1950s, Dodd turned professional. From 1952 until 1964, she was an active member of the LPGA tour. During her professional career, Robert Mayer, Warren Smith, and Babe Didrikson Zaharias instructed Dodd.

Dodd won twice on the LPGA Tour, in 1956 and 1957. She claimed the San Antonio Women's City Championship from 1941 to 1951, the Oak Hills Club Championship in 1951, and the Brackenridge Club Championship in 1950–51. Soon after turning professional, Dodd was the first woman professional to earn an endorsement contract with Hillerich & Bradsby Co.

She retired in 1960 because of a recurring ankle injury she originally broke playing high school basketball. Dodd later taught for many years in the San Antonio area and was a golf instructor at Oak Hills Country Club and Ft. Sam Houston Country Club. Her prominent students at the time, included touring professionals Shirley Furlong, Cindy Lincoln, and Wendy Ward. Dodd was elected national LPGA "Teacher of the Year" in 1980 and attained Master Professional status in 1987.

Dodd was a close friend and pupil of fellow golfer Babe Didrikson Zaharias. According to Susan Cayleff's biography Babe, Dodd was quoted as to saying "I had such admiration for this fabulous person [Zaharias]. I loved her. I would have done anything for her." They met in a 1950 amateur golf tournament in Miami and became friends almost immediately despite the 20-year age difference. This was most likely due to their brash personalities. Both liked to be on the stage, and they often entertained the other women golfers, with Zaharias playing the harmonica and Dodd singing and playing the guitar. They even performed on The Ed Sullivan Show together. In Zaharias' 1955 autobiography This Life I've Led, she talks about how she enjoyed helping Dodd, as a talented teenager, get started in pro golf and her overall fondness for Dodd: "She's like a daughter to me." Dodd appreciated Zaharias's help and friendship. When Zaharias was losing her battle to cancer, Dodd joined Babe and George in Florida to help take care of Zaharias. She looked up to Zaharias and never forgot how someone of Zaharias's athletic stature was willing to help a promising teenager learn the ropes of professional golf. This was a great influence on why Dodd went into teaching after she retired.

== Awards and honors ==
- In 1980, she was elected by the LPGA as their "Teacher of the Year."
- In 2004, she was inducted posthumously into the San Antonio Sports Hall of Fame.

== Professional wins (3) ==
=== LPGA Tour wins (2) ===
- 1956 Lawton Open
- 1957 Colonial Open

=== Other wins (1) ===
- 1951 Hollywood Four-Ball (with Betsy Rawls)
