= Jackson Open =

Golf tournament formerly on the LPGA Tour

The Jackson Open was a golf tournament on the LPGA Tour in 1957, 1958, and 1965. It was played at Colonial Country Club in Jackson, Mississippi.

== Winners ==
All State Ladies' Invitational

- 1965 Jo Ann Prentice

Jackson Open

- 1959–1964 No tournament
- 1958 Jackie Pung

Colonial Open

- 1957 Betty Dodd
