= Wolverine Open =

Golf tournament formerly on the LPGA Tour

The Wolverine Open was a golf tournament on the LPGA Tour, played intermittently from 1955 to 1963. It was played at three courses in the Detroit, Michigan area: Forest Lake Country Club in Bloomfield Hills in 1955, Lochmoor Club in Grosse Pointe Woods in 1957, and Hillcrest Golf & Country Club in Mount Clemens in 1960 and 1963.

== Winners ==
- 1963 Kathy Whitworth
- 1961-62 No tournament
- 1960 Joyce Ziske
- 1958-59 No tournament
- 1957 Mickey Wright
- 1956 No tournament
- 1955 Fay Crocker
