= Gatlinburg Open =

Former LPGA golf tournament

The Gatlinburg Open was a golf tournament on the LPGA Tour from 1957 to 1958. It was played at the Gatlinburg Country Club in Gatlinburg, Tennessee.

== Winners ==
Gatlinburg Open

- 1958 Louise Suggs

Smokey Open

- 1957 Beverly Hanson
