= Serbin Open =

Golf tournament formerly on the LPGA Tour

The Serbin Open was a golf tournament on the LPGA Tour from 1953 to 1957. It was played at the Bayshore Golf Club in Miami Beach, Florida.

== Winners ==
Serbin Open

- 1957 Fay Crocker
- 1956 Fay Crocker
- 1955 Fay Crocker
- 1954 Babe Zaharias

Serbin Miami Beach Open

- 1953 Betty Jameson
