= Lawton Open =

Golf tournament formerly on the LPGA Tour

The Lawton Open was a golf tournament on the LPGA Tour from 1956 to 1958. It was played in Lawton, Oklahoma, at the Lawton Municipal Golf Course in 1956 and at the Lawton Country Club in 1957 and 1958.

== Winners ==
- 1958 Beverly Hanson
- 1957 Marlene Hagge
- 1956 Betty Dodd
