= Jacksonville Ladies Open =

Golf tournament formerly on the LPGA Tour

The Jacksonville Ladies Open was a golf tournament on the LPGA Tour played from 1951 to 1959, and again in 1975. It was played at several different courses in the Jacksonville, Florida area.

== Tournament locations ==
Years	Venue	Location
1951	Ponte Vedra Country Club	Ponte Vedra Beach, Florida
1952-53	Brentwood Municipal Golf Course	Jacksonville, Florida
1954, 1956-59	Hyde Park Golf Club	Jacksonville, Florida
1955	Jacksonville Country Club	Jacksonville, Florida
1975	Selva Marina Country Club	Atlantic Beach, Florida

== Winners ==
Jacksonville Ladies Open

- 1975 Sandra Haynie

Jacksonville Open

- 1960-74 No tournament
- 1959 Mickey Wright
- 1958 Marilynn Smith
- 1957 Mickey Wright
- 1956 Mickey Wright
- 1955 Jackie Pung
- 1953 Patty Berg
- 1952 Louise Suggs

Ponte Vedra Beach Women's Open

- 1951 Babe Zaharias
