= Joyce Ziske =

American professional golfer (born 1934)

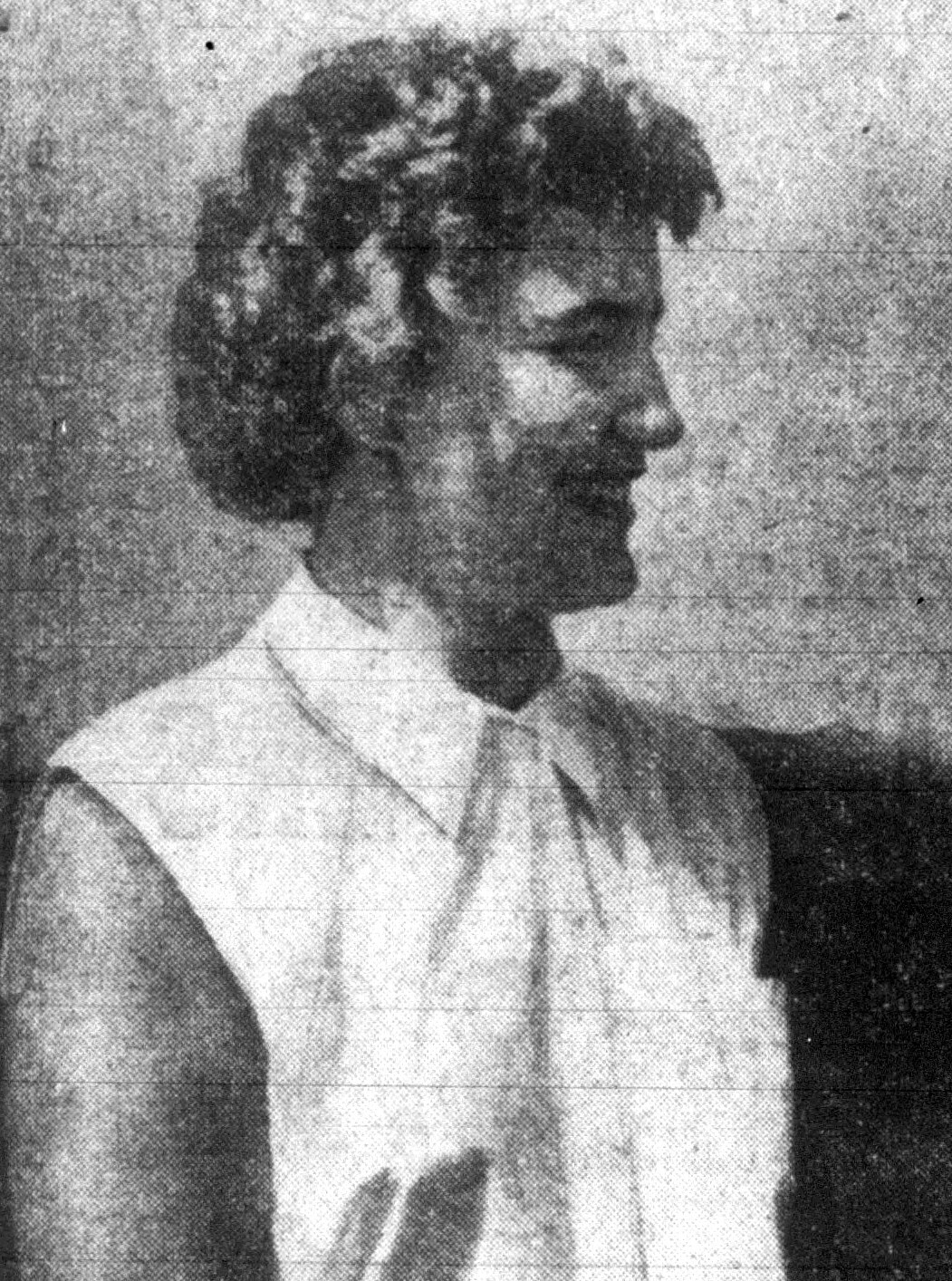
- Ziske, circa 1953

Personal information
- Full name: Joyce Ziske Malison
- Nationality: United States
- Born: May 20, 1934 (age 92) Milwaukee, Wisconsin, U.S.
- Spouse: Tom Malison

Career
- Sport: Golf
- Turned professional: 1955
- Former tour: LPGA Tour (1955–60)
- Professional wins: 5

Number of wins by tour
- LPGA Tour: 4

Best results in LPGA major championships (wins: 1)
- Western Open: Won: 1960
- Titleholders C'ship: T5: 1959
- Women's PGA C'ship: T3: 1958
- U.S. Women's Open: 2nd: 1960

Joyce Ziske (born May 20, 1934), also known as Joyce Ziske Malison, is an American former professional golfer.

== Career ==
As an amateur, Ziske won the Wisconsin Women's Amateur twice and the North and South Women's Amateur. She played on the 1954 Curtis Cup team.

Ziske turned professional on February 8, 1955, and played on the LPGA Tour from 1955 to 1960. In 1960, she won the Women's Western Open which was one of the LPGA major championships at that time. She had her best finish in the U.S. Women's Open that same year, placing second. She retired from professional golf in 1960 after marrying Tom Malison in June 1961, but she played competitively at least once.

== Awards and honors ==
In 1975, she was elected to the Wisconsin Golf Hall of Fame.

== Amateur wins ==
this list may be incomplete

- 1949 District Junior Girls Golf Invitational Tournament
- 1952 Milwaukee County Women's Tournament, Wisconsin Women's Amateur
- 1954 Palm Beach Women's Amateur, North and South Women's Amateur, Wisconsin Women's Amateur

== Professional wins (5) ==
=== LPGA Tour wins (4) ===
- 1956 Syracuse Open
- 1959 Howard Johnson Invitational
- 1960 Wolverine Open, **Women's Western Open**

LPGA major is shown in bold.

=== Other wins (1) ===
- 1960 Hoosier Celebrity

== Major championships ==
=== Wins (1) ===
Year	Championship	Winning score	Margin	Runner-up
1960	Women's Western Open	+9 (79-75-76-72=301)	Playoff^{1}	(United States) Barbara Romack

^{1} Won on second hole of sudden-death playoff.

== Team appearances ==
Amateur

- Curtis Cup (representing the United States): 1954 (winners)
