= Heart of America Invitational =

Golf tournament formerly on the LPGA Tour

The Heart of America Invitational was a golf tournament on the LPGA Tour from 1955 to 1962. It was played in Kansas City, Missouri area.

== Tournament locations ==
Years	Venue	Location
1955	Oakwood Country Club	Kansas City, Missouri
1956, 1962	Hillcrest Country Club	Kansas City, Missouri
1957, 1958	Blue Hills Country Club	Kansas City, Missouri
1961	Brookridge Golf & Country Club	Overland Park, Kansas

== Winners ==
Heart of America Invitational

- 1962 Mickey Wright

Kansas City Open

- 1961 Louise Suggs
- 1959-60 No tournament
- 1958 Bonnie Randolph

Heart of America Invitational

- 1957 Louise Suggs

Kansas City Open

- 1956 Mary Lena Faulk

Heart of America Open

- 1955 Marilynn Smith
