= Peach Blossom Open =

Golf tournament formerly on the LPGA Tour

The Peach Blossom Open was a golf tournament on the LPGA Tour from 1953 to 1966. It was played at the Spartanburg Country Club in Spartanburg, South Carolina. Betsy Rawls, Spartanburg native, hosted the event.

== Winners ==
Peach Blossom Invitational

- 1966 Carol Mann

Peach Blossom Open

- 1965 Marilynn Smith

Peach Blossom Invitational

- 1964 Mickey Wright

Peach Blossom Open

- 1963 Marilynn Smith
- 1962 Mary Lena Faulk
- 1961 Ruth Jessen

Betsy Rawls Peach Blossom Open

- 1960 Wiffi Smith

Betsy Rawls Open

- 1959 Wiffi Smith

Peach Blossom Open

- 1958 Wiffi Smith
- 1957 Betsy Rawls
- 1956 Betsy Rawls
- 1955 Babe Zaharias

Betsy Rawls Open

- 1954 Louise Suggs
- 1953 Louise Suggs
