= Lake Worth Open =

Golf tournament formerly on the LPGA Tour

The Lake Worth Open was a golf tournament on the LPGA Tour from 1957 to 1960, played at the Lake Worth Golf Course in Lake Worth, Florida.

== Winners ==
- 1957 Betsy Rawls
- 1958 Marlene Hagge
- 1959 Betsy Rawls
- 1960 Fay Crocker
