= Havana Open =

LPGA golf tournament

The Havana Open (Spanish: Abierto de La Habana) was a golf tournament on the LPGA Tour from 1956 to 1958. It was played at the Biltmore Country Club in Havana, Cuba.

== Winners ==
Havana Biltmore Open

- 1958 Fay Crocker

Havana Open

- 1957 Patty Berg
- 1956 Louise Suggs
