= Kathy Cornelius =

American professional golfer (1932–2026)

Personal information
- Full name: Kathy McKinnon Cornelius
- Nationality: United States
- Born: October 27, 1932 Boston, Massachusetts, U.S.
- Died: September 28, 2026 (aged 93)
- Spouse: Bill Cornelius (m. 1953)

Career
- Sport: Golf
- College: Florida Southern College
- Turned professional: 1953
- Former tour: LPGA Tour (1956–1985)
- Professional wins: 8

Number of wins by tour
- LPGA Tour: 6
- Other: 2

Best results in LPGA major championships (wins: 1)
- Western Open: 6th: 1959, 1961
- Titleholders C'ship: 2nd: 1960
- Chevron Championship: T62: 1983
- Women's PGA C'ship: T5: 1965
- U.S. Women's Open: Won: 1956
- du Maurier Classic: DNP

Kathy Cornelius (née McKinnon, October 27, 1932 – September 28, 2026) was an American professional golfer.

== Early life ==
Cornelius was born in Boston, Massachusetts, on October 27, 1932. She attended Florida Southern College where she played on the men's golf team as the school did not have a women's team at the time.

== Professional career ==
In 1953, Cornelius turned pro. In 1956, she joined the LPGA Tour and won two events in her rookie season, including the U.S. Women's Open, which was to be her only major championship. She won six LPGA Tour titles in total and had her highest money list finish in 1973, when she came eighth. She made the top-20 of the money list twelve times in total (1957–65 and 1971–73).

In 1985, Kathy and her husband founded Magique Golf, a golf club company based in Arizona, which they ran until 1999. She later taught golf part-time at Rio Salado Golf Course in Tempe, Arizona.

== Personal life and death ==
In 1953, she married golf pro Bill Cornelius.

In 1981, her daughter, Kay, won the U.S. Girls' Junior, making them the only mother-daughter pair to win USGA championships.

Cornelius died on September 28, 2026, at the age of 93.

== Professional wins (8) ==
=== LPGA Tour wins (6) ===
- 1956 (2) St. Petersburg Open, U.S. Women's Open
- 1959 (1) Cosmopolitan Open
- 1961 (1) Tippecanoe Open
- 1972 (1) Bluegrass Invitational
- 1973 (1) Sealy-Faberge Classic

=== Other wins (2) ===
- 1956 Hot Springs 4-Ball Invitational (with Beverly Hanson)
- 1962 Babe Zaharias Open (tie with Betsy Rawls)

== Major championships ==
=== Wins (1) ===
Year	Championship	Winning score	Margin	Runner-up
1956	U.S. Women's Open	+7 (73-77-73-79=302)	Playoff^{1}	(United States) Barbara McIntire (a)

^{1} In an 18-hole playoff, Cornelius 75, McIntire 82.
