= Beverly Hanson =

American professional golfer (1924–2014)

Personal information
- Nationality: United States
- Born: December 5, 1924 Fargo, North Dakota, U.S.
- Died: April 12, 2014 (aged 89) Twin Falls, Idaho, U.S.
- Height: 5 ft 8.5 in (1.74 m)

Career
- Sport: Golf
- College: University of North Dakota; Mills College; University of Wisconsin
- Turned professional: 1951
- Former tour: LPGA Tour
- Professional wins: 19

Number of wins by tour
- LPGA Tour: 17
- Other: 2

Best results in LPGA major championships (wins: 3)
- Western Open: Won: 1956
- Titleholders C'ship: Won: 1958
- Women's PGA C'ship: Won: 1955
- U.S. Women's Open: 4th: 1952

Achievements and awards
- World Golf Hall of Fame: 2023 (member page)
- LPGA Tour Money Winner: 1958
- LPGA Vare Trophy: 1958

Beverly Hanson (December 5, 1924 – April 12, 2014) was an American professional golfer who played on the LPGA Tour.

Hanson was born in Fargo, North Dakota, in 1924. She studied at the University of North Dakota, Mills College in Oakland, California, and the University of Wisconsin and was a bassoon player, performing with civic orchestras. As an amateur golfer, she won the Texas Open in 1949 and both the California and Southern California ladies' championships. She was a member of the 1950 U.S. Curtis Cup golf team and that year won the U.S. Women's Amateur.

In 1951, Hanson turned professional and won the first event she competed in. She won the inaugural LPGA Championship in 1955, defeating Louise Suggs. In 1958 she was the leading money winner on the LPGA Tour.

Hanson had 17 career wins on the LPGA Tour of which three were majors. Besides the inaugural LPGA major title, in 1956 she won the Women's Western Open and in 1958 the Titleholders Championship.

Hanson died on April 12, 2014, in Twin Falls, Idaho, from complications from Alzheimer's and COPD.

Hanson was elected to the World Golf Hall of Fame in 2023 and inducted in 2024.

== Professional wins (18) ==
=== LPGA Tour wins (17) ===
- 1950 (1) Women's Texas Open (as an amateur)
- 1951 (1) Eastern Open
- 1953 (1) Boca Raton Weathervane
- 1954 (2) St. Petersburg Open, Wichita Open
- 1955 (2) LPGA Championship, Battle Creek Open
- 1956 (1) Women's Western Open
- 1957 (2) Smokey Open, Land of Sky Open
- 1958 (2) Titleholders Championship, Lawton Open
- 1959 (4) Golden Triangle Festival, American Women's Open, Spokane Open, Links Invitation Open
- 1960 (1) St. Petersburg Open

=== Other wins (1) ===
- 1949 Women's Texas Open (as an amateur)
- 1955 Hot Springs 4-Ball Invitational (with Kathy Cornelius)

== Major championships ==
=== Wins (3) ===
Year	Championship	Winning score	Margin	Runner-up
1955	LPGA Championship	4 & 3		(United States) Louise Suggs
1956	Women's Western Open	E (75-81-72-76=304)	4 strokes	(United States) Louise Suggs
1958	Titleholders Championship	+11 (72-80-73-74=299)	5 strokes	(United States) Betty Dodd

== Team appearances ==
Amateur

- Curtis Cup (representing the United States): 1950 (winners)

== See also ==
- List of golfers with most LPGA Tour wins
- List of golfers with most LPGA major championship wins
