= Fay Crocker =

Uruguayan professional golfer (1914–1983)

Personal information
- Nationality: Uruguay
- Born: 2 August 1914 Montevideo, Uruguay
- Died: 16 September 1983 (aged 69) Montevideo, Uruguay

Career
- Sport: Golf
- Turned professional: 1954
- Former tour: LPGA Tour
- Professional wins: at least 12

Number of wins by tour
- LPGA Tour: 11
- Other: 1

Best results in LPGA major championships (wins: 2)
- Western Open: T2: 1955
- Titleholders C'ship: Won: 1960
- Women's PGA C'ship: 2nd: 1958
- U.S. Women's Open: Won: 1955

Achievements and awards
- Golf Digest Most Improved Female Professional Golfer: 1955

Fay Crocker (2 August 1914 – 16 September 1983) was a Uruguayan professional golfer. She played on the LPGA Tour. In her career, she won 11 LPGA tournaments, including two major championships, the 1955 U.S. Women's Open and 1960 Titleholders Championship. Crocker was the oldest player to win her first LPGA event, the first U.S. Women's Open champion from outside the United States, and the oldest women's major champion.

== Early life ==
Crocker was born in Montevideo, Uruguay, on 2 August 1914. Her parents were both successful professional athletes; her father Frederick, who was a rancher by trade, was a 27-time national golf champion in Uruguay, and her mother Helen also won several national championships in golf and tennis, the former of which she won on six occasions. Crocker was the great-granddaughter of Frederick Crocker, a naval commander who later worked in the U.S. Consulate of Uruguay during the 1870s.

Crocker began playing golf at the age of six, later becoming an accomplished player in South America, claiming her home country's national title on 20 occasions and Argentina's championship another 14.

== Amateur career ==
Crocker traveled to the United States to compete in the U.S. Women's Amateur as early as 1939. After bowing out of the match-play event in the third round, she did not play in the tournament again for 11 years. For a time, Crocker worked in Buenos Aires, Argentina, as a U.S. Embassy clerk. In 1950, she returned to the U.S. Women's Amateur and advanced to the fourth round before losing to Mae Murray in 27 holes, nine more than the regulation 18. At the time, it was the longest playoff in a women's match-play event organized by the United States Golf Association.

== Professional career ==
In 1954, Crocker became a professional golfer when she was 39 years old. Her professional debut came at the Sea Island Open, where she shot a course-record 69 in the final round and posted a seventh-place result.

In Crocker's 19th professional tournament, the 1955 Serbin Open, she won for the first time, beating Patty Berg by one stroke. She is the oldest player to win for the first time on the LPGA Tour as of 2013, doing so at the age of 40. Later in 1955, Crocker posted a seven-stroke victory in the Wolverine Open. At the Women's Western Open, she started the final round one stroke out of the lead and finished tied for second, two strokes behind winner Patty Berg. Crocker added to her two previous wins in 1955 by claiming a victory in the U.S. Women's Open. In a tournament that featured 45-mile-per-hour wind gusts, Crocker was the only player to finish in under 300 strokes; her final score of 299 was four strokes ahead of runners-up Louise Suggs and Mary Lena Faulk. The win made Crocker the first U.S. Women's Open champion from a country other than the United States. In addition, she became the first golfer ever to finish a U.S. Women's Open round in fewer than 70 strokes, achieving the feat in the second round with a 68.

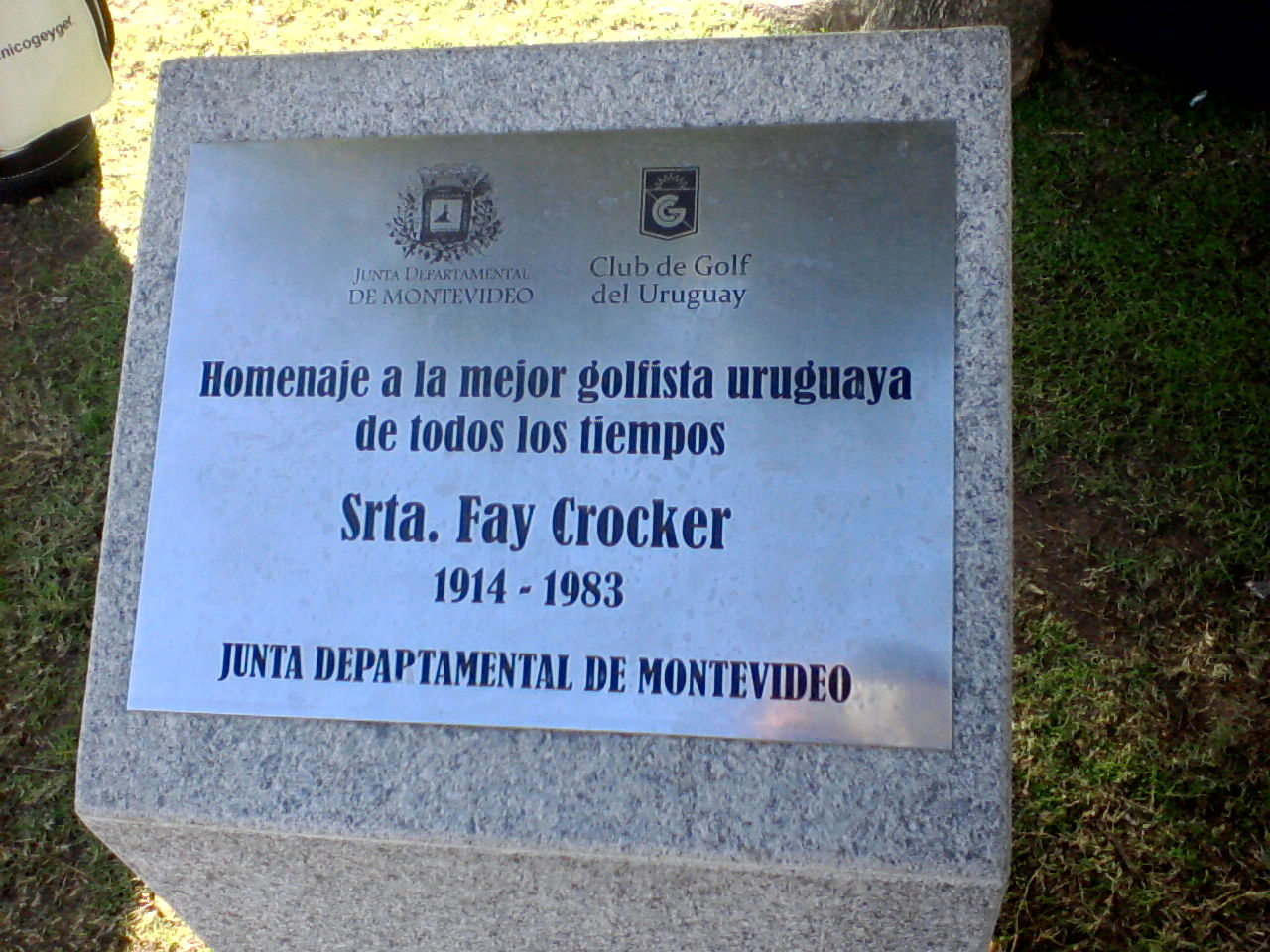
Plaque honoring Crocker with the legend "The best Uruguayan female golfer of all time" at Club de Golf del Uruguay.

In 1956, Crocker again won the Serbin Open (also known as the Miami Beach Open), and added a victory at the St. Louis Open. Crocker won two tournaments in 1957: her third straight Serbin Open and the Triangle Round Robin. At the 1958 LPGA Championship, she finished as the runner-up, six strokes behind winner Mickey Wright. That year, she won the Havana Biltmore Open and Waterloo Open, making it her fourth consecutive season with multiple victories.

Crocker won two events early in the 1960 season, beginning with the Lake Worth Open. Then, in March 1960, she claimed a victory in the Titleholders Championship; her four-round score of 303 was seven strokes ahead of the closest competitor, Kathy Cornelius. Crocker was 45 years old when she won the Titleholders; as of 2013, she is the oldest major champion in LPGA Tour history. Having competed in almost all LPGA events in the six-year stretch from 1955 to 1960, Crocker is credited with 11 official tour wins. She stopped playing on the LPGA Tour in 1961, having amassed $73,410 in earnings, which placed her among the top 10 in the LPGA's career money list at the time of her retirement.

== Retirement and death ==
After her retirement, Crocker moved to Argentina, where she resided for most of her life after professional golf. On 16 September 1983, when Crocker was 69 years old, she died in Montevideo, Uruguay.

== Awards and honors ==
In 1955, Golf Digest bestowed upon her the Most Improved Female Professional Golfer award.

== Professional wins (12) ==
=== LPGA Tour wins (11) ===
- 1955 Serbin Open, Wolverine Open, U.S. Women's Open
- 1956 Serbin Open, St. Louis Open
- 1957 Serbin Open, Triangle Round Robin
- 1958 Havana Biltmore Open, Waterloo Open
- 1960 Lake Worth Open, Titleholders Championship

=== Other wins (1) ===
- 1957 Hot Springs 4-Ball (with Marilynn Smith)

== Major championships ==
=== Wins (2) ===
Year	Championship	Winning score	Margin	Runner(s)-up
1955	U.S. Women's Open	+11 (74-72-79-74=299)	4 strokes	(United States) Mary Lena Faulk, (United States) Louise Suggs
1960	Titleholders Championship	+15 (75-75-77-76=303)	7 strokes	(United States) Kathy Cornelius

== See also ==
- List of golfers with most LPGA Tour wins
