= Betty Jameson =

American professional golfer (1919–2009)

Personal information
- Full name: Elizabeth May Jameson
- Nickname: Betty
- Nationality: United States
- Born: May 9, 1919 Norman, Oklahoma, U.S.
- Died: February 7, 2009 (aged 89) Boynton Beach, Florida, U.S.
- Height: 5 ft 8 in (1.73 m)

Career
- Sport: Golf
- College: University of Texas
- Turned professional: 1945
- Former tour: LPGA Tour (Founder)
- Professional wins: 18

Number of wins by tour
- LPGA Tour: 13
- Other: 5

Best results in LPGA major championships (wins: 3)
- Western Open: Won: 1942, 1954
- Titleholders C'ship: 5th: 1956, 1961
- Women's PGA C'ship: 3rd/T3: 1956, 1958
- U.S. Women's Open: Won: 1947

Achievements and awards
- World Golf Hall of Fame: 1951 (member page)
- Commissioner's Award (LPGA Founders): 2000

Elizabeth May Jameson (May 9, 1919 – February 7, 2009) was an American professional golfer. She was one of the thirteen founders of the Ladies Professional Golf Association (LPGA) in 1950. She won three major championships and a total of thirteen events during her career, one as amateur and twelve as a professional. She is a member of the World Golf Hall of Fame.

== Amateur career ==
Jameson was born in Norman, Oklahoma and graduated from Dallas' Sunset High School in 1939. She started playing golf at age 11. According to her obituary in the New York Times, her mother gave her 50 cents for a greens fee and another 50 cents to rent a set of clubs at a public golf course in Dallas when she was 11 years old. She won the 1932 Texas Publinx title at the age of 13 and the Southern Championship when she was 15. She won the U.S. Women's Amateur in 1939 and 1940. She won the Women's Western Amateur in 1940 and 1942. In 1942, she also won the Women's Western Open, a major at the time, while still an amateur. She was selected to the DISD Athletics Hall of Fame and is a Member of the Sunset High School Hall of Fame.

== Professional career ==
Jameson turned professional in 1945. She was one of the thirteen women who founded the LPGA in 1950. She won a total of thirteen events, including three major championships. In 1947, she won the U.S. Women's Open with a 295 total at the Starmount Forest Country Club in Greensboro, North Carolina, marking the first time a female golfer scored lower than 300 in a 72-hole tournament. She won the 1954 Women's Western Open again. In 1967, when the LPGA Tour Hall of Fame was created, Jameson was one of the six inaugural inductees. The LPGA recognized her induction year into the Hall of Fame of Women's Golf, 1951, as her official induction year into the LPGA Tour Hall of Fame and the World Golf Hall of Fame. She competed in her final LPGA event, the Burdine's Invitational, in 1970.

Jameson conceived the idea of annually honoring the golfer with the lowest scoring average on the LPGA Tour and, in 1952, donated a trophy for that in the name of Glenna Collett Vare. She was inducted into the Women's Sports Foundation's Hall of Fame in 1999, and was listed as "...as one of the (LPGA) association’s top 50 players and teachers." In 2004, August 14 was proclaimed "Betty Jameson Day" in Delray Beach, Florida, to commemorate her career accomplishments.

Jameson had to stop playing golf, other than doing some occasional chipping and putting, because of pain in her wrists caused by carpal tunnel syndrome. She took up painting for her own enjoyment and sold a few works to friends. However, according to her obituary in the New York Times, she was reportedly destitute when she died at her home, which was then in Boynton Beach, Florida.

== Professional wins ==
=== LPGA Tour wins (13) ===
- 1942 (1) Women's Western Open (as an amateur)
- 1947 (2) U.S. Women's Open, Women's Texas Open
- 1948 (1) Tampa Open
- 1952 (3) Corpus Christi Tournament, Bakersfield Open (tie with Marlene Hagge, Betsy Rawls, and Babe Zaharias), World Championship
- 1953 (1) Serbin Miami Beach Open
- 1954 (1) Women's Western Open
- 1955 (4) Sarasota Open, Babe Zaharias Open, White Mountain Open, Richmond Open

=== Other wins (5) ===
- 1938 Women's Texas Open (as an amateur)
- 1946 Hardscrabble Open
- 1952 Hardscrabble Open
- 1955 Virginia Hot Springs 4-Ball (with Mary Lena Faulk)
- 1958 Homestead 4-Ball (with Mary Lena Faulk)

== Major championships ==
=== Wins (3) ===
Year	Championship	Winning score	Margin	Runner(s)-up
1942	Women's Western Open	9 & 7		(United States) Phyllis Otto
1947	U.S. Women's Open	−9 (76-75-74-70=295)	6 strokes	(United States) Polly Riley (a), (United States) Sally Sessions (a)
1954	Women's Western Open	6 & 5		(United States) Louise Suggs

== See also ==
- List of golfers with most LPGA Tour wins
