= LPGA =

Association of US female professional golfers

Ladies Professional Golf Association
- Current season, competition or edition: 2026 LPGA Tour
- Logo introduced in October 2007
- Sport: Golf
- Founded: 1950; 76 years ago
- Founder: 13 original LPGA players
- First season: 1950
- Commissioner: Craig Kessler
- Country: United States, with events in other countries around the world
- Most titles: (United States) Kathy Whitworth (88)
- Broadcasters: NBC Sports; Golf Channel; CBS Sports
- Website: lpga.com

The Ladies Professional Golf Association (LPGA) is an American organization for female golfers. The organization is headquartered at LPGA International in Daytona Beach, Florida, and is best known for running the LPGA Tour, a series of weekly golf tournaments for elite women professional golfers from around the world.

== Organization and history ==
Other "LPGAs" exist in other countries, each with a territorial designation, but the U.S. organization is the first and most prestigious and therefore does not have an "American" qualifier. The LPGA is also an organization for female club and teaching professionals. This is different from the PGA Tour, which runs the main professional tours in the U.S. and, since 1968, has been independent of the club and teaching professionals' organization, the Professional Golfers' Association of America (or PGA of America).

The LPGA also administers an annual qualifying school similar to that conducted by the PGA Tour. Depending on a golfer's finish in the final qualifying tournament, she may receive full or partial playing privileges on the LPGA Tour. In addition to the main LPGA Tour, the LPGA also owns and operates the Epson Tour, formerly the Futures Tour, the official developmental tour of the LPGA. Top finishers at the end of each season on that tour receive playing privileges on the main LPGA Tour for the following year.

The LPGA is the oldest continuing women's professional sports organization in the United States. It succeeded the WPGA (Women's Professional Golf Association), which was founded in 1944 but stopped its limited tour after the 1948 season and officially ceased operations in December 1949. The WPGA had been founded by Ellen Griffin, Betty Hicks, and Hope Seignious.

In 1950, a Certificate of Incorporation was issued to the Ladies Professional Golf Association by the State of New York. Five women signed the original charter: Patty Berg, Helen Dettweiler, Sally Sessions, Betty Jameson, and Helen Hicks. Eight more professionals attended the organizational meeting, which was held at Rolling Hills Country Club, Wichita, Kansas, that same year: Alice Bauer, Marlene Bauer (Hagge), Betty Mims Danoff, Opal Hill, Marilynn Smith, Shirley Spork, Louise Suggs, and Babe Zaharias. Its 13 founders were: Alice Bauer, Patty Berg, Bettye Danoff, Helen Dettweiler, Marlene Hagge, Helen Hicks, Opal Hill, Betty Jameson, Sally Sessions, Marilynn Smith, Shirley Spork, Louise Suggs, and Babe Zaharias. Patty Berg served as its first president. The founders were elected to the World Golf Hall of Fame as a group in 2023 though six had already been inducted individually.

The first LPGA tournament was the 1950 Tampa Women's Open, held at Palma Ceia Golf and Country Club in Tampa, Florida. Ironically, the winner was amateur Polly Riley, who beat the stellar field of professional founders. In 1956, the LPGA hosted its first tournament outside the United States at the Havana Open in Havana, Cuba.

In 2001, Jane Blalock's JBC Marketing established the Women's Senior Golf Tour, now called the Legends Tour, for women professionals aged 45 and older. This is affiliated with the LPGA, but is not owned by the LPGA.

Michael Whan, a former marketing executive in the sporting goods industry, became the eighth commissioner of the LPGA in October 2009, succeeding the ousted Carolyn Bivens.

After a lawsuit filed by golfer Lana Lawless, the rules were changed in 2010 to allow transgender competitors. In 2013, trans woman Bobbi Lancaster faced local scorn for attempting to play in Arizona's Cactus Tour in hopes of getting a spot for the LPGA Qualifying Tournament. In December 2024, the LPGA published a new policy that states in order to compete as female in their tournaments, players must either be assigned female at birth, or have transitioned to female before undergoing male puberty. The policy goes into effect in 2025.

In 2018, the LPGA acquired an amateur golf association, the Executive Women's Golf Association (EWGA), and expanded its emphasis to include amateur golfers in the U.S. and North America. Initially called the LPGA Women Who Play, the amateur organization was rebranded as the LPGA Amateur Golf Association. The LPGA Amateur Golf Association has member-operated chapters throughout North America and the Caribbean.

== LPGA Tour tournaments ==
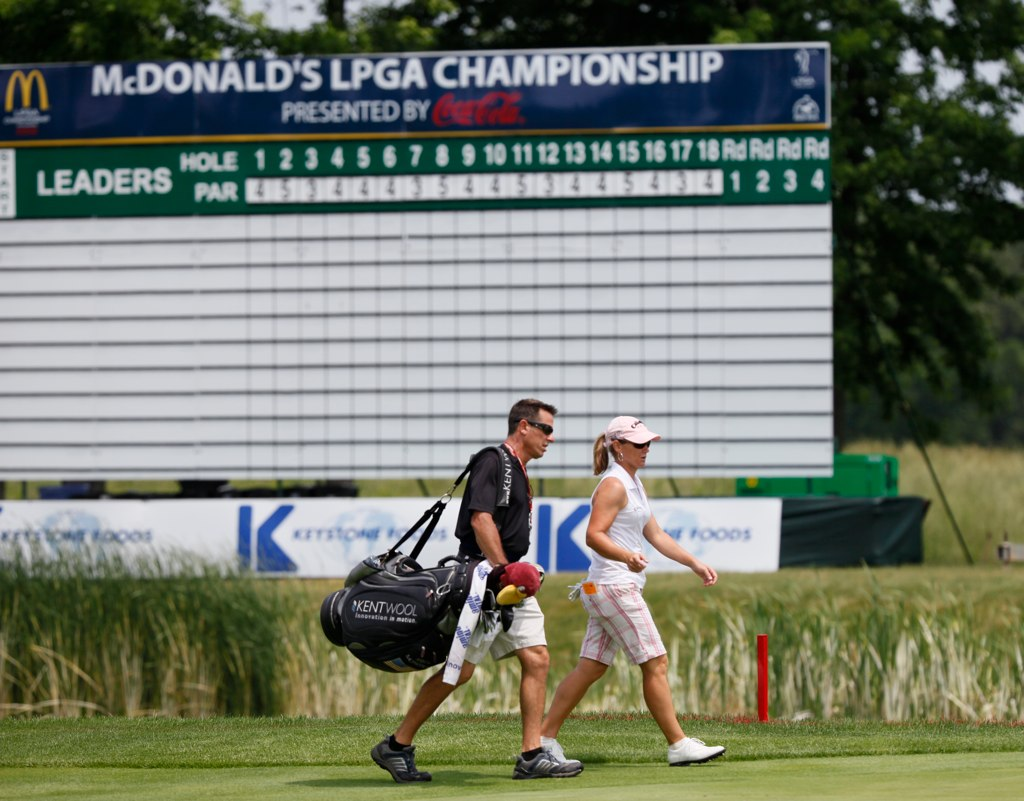
Kristy McPherson during her practice round before the 2009 LPGA Championship at Bulle Rock Golf Course in Maryland.

As a United States–based tour, most of the LPGA Tour's events are held in the United States. In 1956, the LPGA hosted its first tournament outside the United States at the Havana Open in Havana, Cuba. In 2020, fourteen tournaments are held outside of the United States, seven events in Asia, four in Europe, two events in Australia, and one in Canada.

As of 2025, six of the tournaments held outside North America are co-sanctioned with other professional tours. The Ladies European Tour co-sanctions the Women's British Open, The Evian Championship in France, and the Women's Scottish Open. The other three co-sanctioned events—the Blue Bay LPGA, Buick LPGA Shanghai (China LPGA Tour) and Toto Japan Classic (LPGA of Japan Tour)—are held during the tour's autumn swing to Asia.

=== LPGA majors ===
The LPGA's annual major championships are:

- Chevron Championship
- U.S. Women's Open
- Women's PGA Championship
- Women's British Open
- The Evian Championship

=== LPGA Playoffs ===
Since 2006, the LPGA has played a season-ending championship tournament. Through the 2008 season, it was known as the LPGA Playoffs at The ADT; in 2009 and 2010, it was known as the LPGA Tour Championship. In 2011, the event became the CME Group Titleholders, held in November; since 2014, it has been known as the CME Group Tour Championship, and that name is used as of 2024.

From 2006 through 2008 the LPGA schedule was divided into two halves, with 15 players from each half qualifying for the Championship based on their performance. Two wild-card selections were also included for a final field of 21 players. The winner of the LPGA Tour Championship, which features three days of "playoffs" plus the final championship round, earns $1 million.

In 2009, the Tour Championship field was increased to 120 players, with entry open to all Tour members in the top 120 on the money list as of three weeks prior to the start of the tournament. The total purse was $1.5 million with $225,000 going to the winner.

The CME Group Titleholders, which resurrects the name of a former LPGA major championship (the Titleholders Championship), was first played in 2011. From 2011 to 2013, its field was made up of three qualifiers from each official tour event during the season, specifically the top three finishers not previously qualified.

After 2014, the field is determined by a season-long points race, the Race to the CME Globe. Points conferred to players on tour depend on whether the tournament is major or not, and placement. From 2014 to 2018, the top 72 players in the Race to the CME Globe competed in the CME Group Tour Championship, with the top 12 players mathematically eligible to win a $1 million bonus in 2017 and 2018. Past Race to the CME Globe champions include Lydia Ko (2014, 2015, 2022), Ariya Jutanugarn (2016, 2018),Lexi Thompson (2017) and Atthaya 'Jeeno' Thitikul (2024, 2025).

== Tournament prize money ==
In 2010, total official prize money on the LPGA Tour was $41.4 million, a decrease of over $6 million from 2009. In 2010 there were 24 official tournaments, down from 28 in 2009 and 34 in 2008. Despite the loss in total tournaments, the number of tournaments hosted outside of the United States in 2010 stayed the same, as all four lost tournaments had been hosted in the United States. By 2016, the number of tournaments had risen to 33 with a record-high total prize money in excess of $63 million. In 2019, a new record was set with total prize money amounting to $70.5 million (a rise of over $5 million in one year).

== International presence ==
In its first four decades, the LPGA Tour was dominated by American players. Sandra Post of Canada became the first player living outside the United States to gain an LPGA tour card in 1968. The non-U.S. contingent is now very large. The last time an American player topped the money list was in 2014 (Stacy Lewis), the last time an American led the tour in tournaments won was in 2020 (Danielle Kang), and from 2000 through 2009, non-Americans won 31 of 40 major championships.

Particularly, one of the notable trends seen in the early 21st century in the LPGA is the rise and dominance of Korean golfers. Se Ri Pak's early success in the LPGA sparked the boom in Korean women golfers on the LPGA Tour. In 2009, there were 122 non-Americans from 27 countries on the tour, including 47 from South Korea, 14 from Sweden, 10 from Australia, eight from the United Kingdom (four from England, three from Scotland and one from Wales), seven from Canada, five from Taiwan, and four from Japan.

== Historical tour schedules and results ==
Year	Number of official tournaments	Countries hosting tournaments	Tournaments in United States	Tournaments in other countries	Total prize money ($)
2025	33	11	22	11	131,000,000
2024	33	11	22	11	125,500,000
2023	32	11	21	11	102,350,000
2022	32	9	23	9	93,900,000
2021	30	7	23	7	69,200,000
2020	18	3	14	4	41,300,000
2019	32	12	20	12	70,200,000
2018	33	13	19	14	66,950,000
2017	34	15	17	17	67,650,000
2016	33	14	18	15	63,000,000
2015	31	14	17	14	59,100,000
2014	32	14	17	15	57,550,000
2013	28	14	14	14	48,900,000
2012	27	12	15	12	47,000,000
2011	23	11	13	10	41,500,000
2010	24	10	14	10	41,400,000
2009	28	9	18	10	47,600,000
2008	34	8	24	10	60,300,000
2007	31	8	23	8	54,285,000
2006	33	8	25	8	50,275,000
2005	32	7	25	7	45,100,000
2004	32	6	27	5	42,875,000

- Official tournaments are tournaments in which earnings and scores are credited to the players' official LPGA record.

== Hall of Fame ==
The LPGA established the Hall of Fame of Women's Golf in 1951, with four charter members: Patty Berg, Betty Jameson, Louise Suggs, and Babe Zaharias. After being inactive for several years, the Hall of Fame moved in 1967 to its first physical premises, in Augusta, Georgia, and was renamed the LPGA Tour Hall of Fame. In 1998 it merged into the World Golf Hall of Fame.

== LPGA Tour awards ==
The LPGA Tour presents several annual awards. Three are awarded in competitive contests, based on scoring over the course of the year.

- The Player of the Year is awarded based on a formula in which points are awarded for top-10 finishes and are doubled at the LPGA's five major championships. The points system is: 30 points for first; 12 points for second; nine points for third; seven points for fourth; six points for fifth; five points for sixth; four points for seventh; three points for eighth; two points for ninth and one point for 10th.
- The Vare Trophy, named for Glenna Collett-Vare, is given to the player with the lowest scoring average for the season.
- The Louise Suggs Rookie of the Year Award is awarded to the first-year player on the LPGA Tour who scores the highest in a points competition in which points are awarded based on a player's finish in an event. The points system is: 150 points for first; 80 points for second; 75 points for third; 70 points for fourth; and 65 points for fifth. After fifth place, points are awarded in decrements of three, beginning at sixth place with 62 points. Points are doubled in the major events and at the season-ending Tour Championship. Rookies who make the cut in an event and finish below 41st each receive five points. The award is named after Louise Suggs, one of the founders of the LPGA.

American golfer Nancy Lopez, in 1978, is the only player to win all three awards in the same season. Lopez was also the Tour's top money earner that season.

Year	Player of the Year	Vare Trophy	Rookie of the Year
2026	(United States) Nelly Korda (2)	(Japan) Miyū Yamashita	(Japan) Erika Hara
2025	(Thailand) Jeeno Thitikul	(Thailand) Jeeno Thitikul (2)	(Japan) Miyū Yamashita
2024	(United States) Nelly Korda	(Japan) Ayaka Furue	(Japan) Mao Saigo
2023	(United States) Lilia Vu	(Thailand) Jeeno Thitikul	(South Korea) Ryu Hae-ran
2022	(New Zealand) Lydia Ko (2)	(New Zealand) Lydia Ko (2)	(Thailand) Jeeno Thitikul
2021	(South Korea) Ko Jin-young (2)	(New Zealand) Lydia Ko	(Thailand) Patty Tavatanakit
2020	(South Korea) Kim Sei-young	(United States) Danielle Kang	–
2019	(South Korea) Ko Jin-young	(South Korea) Ko Jin-young	(South Korea) Lee Jeong-eun
2018	(Thailand) Ariya Jutanugarn (2)	(Thailand) Ariya Jutanugarn	(South Korea) Ko Jin-young
2017	(South Korea) Park Sung-hyun (South Korea) Ryu So-yeon	(United States) Lexi Thompson	(South Korea) Park Sung-hyun
2016	(Thailand) Ariya Jutanugarn	(South Korea) Chun In-gee	(South Korea) Chun In-gee
2015	(New Zealand) Lydia Ko	(South Korea) Inbee Park (2)	(South Korea) Kim Sei-young
2014	(United States) Stacy Lewis (2)	(United States) Stacy Lewis (2)	(New Zealand) Lydia Ko
2013	(South Korea) Inbee Park	(United States) Stacy Lewis	(Thailand) Moriya Jutanugarn
2012	(United States) Stacy Lewis	(South Korea) Inbee Park	(South Korea) Ryu So-yeon
2011	(Taiwan) Yani Tseng (2)	(Taiwan) Yani Tseng	(South Korea) Hee-kyung Seo
2010	(Taiwan) Yani Tseng	(South Korea) Choi Na-yeon	(Spain) Azahara Muñoz
2009	(Mexico) Lorena Ochoa (4)	(Mexico) Lorena Ochoa (4)	(South Korea) Jiyai Shin
2008	(Mexico) Lorena Ochoa (3)	(Mexico) Lorena Ochoa (3)	(Taiwan) Yani Tseng
2007	(Mexico) Lorena Ochoa (2)	(Mexico) Lorena Ochoa (2)	(Brazil) Angela Park
2006	(Mexico) Lorena Ochoa	(Mexico) Lorena Ochoa	(South Korea) Lee Seon-hwa
2005	(Sweden) Annika Sörenstam (8)	(Sweden) Annika Sörenstam (6)	(United States) Paula Creamer
2004	(Sweden) Annika Sörenstam (7)	(South Korea) Grace Park	(South Korea) Ahn Shi-hyun
2003	(Sweden) Annika Sörenstam (6)	(South Korea) Pak Se-ri	(Mexico) Lorena Ochoa
2002	(Sweden) Annika Sörenstam (5)	(Sweden) Annika Sörenstam (5)	(United States) Beth Bauer
2001	(Sweden) Annika Sörenstam (4)	(Sweden) Annika Sörenstam (4)	(South Korea) Han Hee-won
2000	(Australia) Karrie Webb (2)	(Australia) Karrie Webb (3)	(United States) Dorothy Delasin
1999	(Australia) Karrie Webb	(Australia) Karrie Webb (2)	(South Korea) Mi-Hyun Kim
1998	(Sweden) Annika Sörenstam (3)	(Sweden) Annika Sörenstam (3)	(South Korea) Pak Se-ri
1997	(Sweden) Annika Sörenstam (2)	(Australia) Karrie Webb	(England) Lisa Hackney
1996	(England) Laura Davies	(Sweden) Annika Sörenstam (2)	(Australia) Karrie Webb
1995	(Sweden) Annika Sörenstam	(Sweden) Annika Sörenstam	(United States) Pat Hurst
1994	(United States) Beth Daniel (3)	(United States) Beth Daniel (3)	(Sweden) Annika Sörenstam
1993	(United States) Betsy King (3)	(United States) Betsy King (2)	(England) Suzanne Strudwick
1992	(United States) Dottie Mochrie	(United States) Dottie Mochrie	(Sweden) Helen Alfredsson
1991	(United States) Pat Bradley (2)	(United States) Pat Bradley (2)	(United States) Brandie Burton
1990	(United States) Beth Daniel (2)	(United States) Beth Daniel (2)	(Japan) Hiromi Kobayashi
1989	(United States) Betsy King (2)	(United States) Beth Daniel	(Scotland) Pam Wright
1988	(United States) Nancy Lopez (4)	(United States) Colleen Walker	(Sweden) Liselotte Neumann
1987	(Japan) Ayako Okamoto	(United States) Betsy King	(United States) Tammie Green
1986	(United States) Pat Bradley	(United States) Pat Bradley	(United States) Jody Rosenthal
1985	(United States) Nancy Lopez (3)	(United States) Nancy Lopez (3)	(United States) Penny Hammel
1984	(United States) Betsy King	(United States) Patty Sheehan	(United States) Juli Inkster
1983	(United States) Patty Sheehan	(United States) JoAnne Carner (5)	(United States) Stephanie Farwig
1982	(United States) JoAnne Carner (3)	(United States) JoAnne Carner (4)	(United States) Patti Rizzo
1981	(United States) JoAnne Carner (2)	(United States) JoAnne Carner (3)	(United States) Patty Sheehan
1980	(United States) Beth Daniel	(United States) Amy Alcott	(United States) Myra Blackwelder
1979	(United States) Nancy Lopez (2)	(United States) Nancy Lopez (2)	(United States) Beth Daniel
1978	(United States) Nancy Lopez	(United States) Nancy Lopez	(United States) Nancy Lopez
1977	(United States) Judy Rankin (2)	(United States) Judy Rankin (3)	(United States) Debbie Massey
1976	(United States) Judy Rankin	(United States) Judy Rankin (2)	(United States) Bonnie Lauer
1975	(United States) Sandra Palmer	(United States) JoAnne Carner (2)	(United States) Amy Alcott
1974	(United States) JoAnne Carner	(United States) JoAnne Carner	(Australia) Jan Stephenson
1973	(United States) Kathy Whitworth (7)	(United States) Judy Rankin	(United States) Laura Baugh
1972	(United States) Kathy Whitworth (6)	(United States) Kathy Whitworth (7)	(Canada) Jocelyne Bourassa
1971	(United States) Kathy Whitworth (5)	(United States) Kathy Whitworth (6)	(South Africa) Sally Little
1970	(United States) Sandra Haynie	(United States) Kathy Whitworth (5)	(United States) JoAnne Carner
1969	(United States) Kathy Whitworth (4)	(United States) Kathy Whitworth (4)	(United States) Jane Blalock
1968	(United States) Kathy Whitworth (3)	(United States) Carol Mann	(Canada) Sandra Post
1967	(United States) Kathy Whitworth (2)	(United States) Kathy Whitworth (3)	(United States) Sharron Moran
1966	(United States) Kathy Whitworth	(United States) Kathy Whitworth (2)	(United States) Jan Ferraris
1965	–	(United States) Kathy Whitworth	(Australia) Margie Masters
1964	–	(United States) Mickey Wright (5)	(United States) Susie Maxwell
1963	–	(United States) Mickey Wright (4)	(United States) Clifford Ann Creed
1962	–	(United States) Mickey Wright (3)	(United States) Mary Mills
1961	–	(United States) Mickey Wright (2)	–
1960	–	(United States) Mickey Wright	–
1959	–	(United States) Betsy Rawls	–
1958	–	(United States) Beverly Hanson	–
1957	–	(United States) Louise Suggs	–
1956	–	(United States) Patty Berg (3)	–
1955	–	(United States) Patty Berg (2)	–
1954	–	(United States) Babe Zaharias	–
1953	–	(United States) Patty Berg	–

== Leading money winners and most events won by year ==
Year	Player	Country	Earnings ($)	Most wins
2026	Jeeno Thitikul	Thailand	6,923,458	5 – Jeeno Thitikul
2025	Jeeno Thitikul	Thailand	7,578,330	3 – Jeeno Thitikul
2024	Jeeno Thitikul	Thailand	6,059,309	7 – Nelly Korda
2023	Lilia Vu	United States	3,502,303	4 – Céline Boutier, Lilia Vu
2022	Lydia Ko	New Zealand	4,364,403	3 – Lydia Ko, Jennifer Kupcho
2021	Ko Jin-young	South Korea	3,502,161	5 – Ko Jin-young
2020	Ko Jin-young	South Korea	1,667,925	2 – Danielle Kang, Kim Sei-young
2019	Ko Jin-young	South Korea	2,773,894	4 – Ko Jin-young
2018	Ariya Jutanugarn	Thailand	2,743,949	3 – Ariya Jutanugarn, Park Sung-hyun
2017	Park Sung-hyun	South Korea	2,335,883	3 – Shanshan Feng, Kim In-Kyung
2016	Ariya Jutanugarn	Thailand	2,550,928	5 – Ariya Jutanugarn
2015	Lydia Ko	New Zealand	2,800,802	5 – Lydia Ko, Inbee Park
2014	Stacy Lewis	United States	2,539,039	3 – Lydia Ko, Stacy Lewis, Inbee Park
2013	Inbee Park	South Korea	2,456,619	6 – Inbee Park
2012	Inbee Park	South Korea	2,287,080	4 – Stacy Lewis
2011	Yani Tseng	Taiwan	2,921,713	7 – Yani Tseng
2010	Choi Na-yeon	South Korea	1,871,166	5 – Ai Miyazato
2009	Jiyai Shin	South Korea	1,807,334	3 – Jiyai Shin, Lorena Ochoa
2008	Lorena Ochoa	Mexico	2,754,660	7 – Lorena Ochoa
2007	Lorena Ochoa	Mexico	4,364,994	8 – Lorena Ochoa
2006	Lorena Ochoa	Mexico	2,592,872	6 – Lorena Ochoa
2005	Annika Sörenstam	Sweden	2,588,240	10 – Annika Sörenstam
2004	Annika Sörenstam	Sweden	2,544,707	8 – Annika Sörenstam
2003	Annika Sörenstam	Sweden	2,029,506	6 – Annika Sörenstam
2002	Annika Sörenstam	Sweden	2,863,904	11 – Annika Sörenstam
2001	Annika Sörenstam	Sweden	2,105,868	8 – Annika Sörenstam
2000	Karrie Webb	Australia	1,876,853	7 – Karrie Webb
1999	Karrie Webb	Australia	1,591,959	6 – Karrie Webb
1998	Annika Sörenstam	Sweden	1,092,748	4 – Annika Sörenstam, Pak Se-ri
1997	Annika Sörenstam	Sweden	1,236,789	6 – Annika Sörenstam
1996	Karrie Webb	Australia	1,002,000	4 – Laura Davies, Dottie Pepper, Karrie Webb
1995	Annika Sörenstam	Sweden	666,533	3 – Annika Sörenstam
1994	Laura Davies	England	687,201	4 – Beth Daniel
1993	Betsy King	United States	595,992	3 – Brandie Burton
1992	Dottie Mochrie	United States	693,335	4 – Dottie Mochrie
1991	Pat Bradley	United States	763,118	4 – Pat Bradley, Meg Mallon
1990	Beth Daniel	United States	826,578	7 – Beth Daniel
1989	Betsy King	United States	654,132	6 – Betsy King
1988	Sherri Turner	United States	348,851	3 – 5 players (see 1)
1987	Ayako Okamoto	Japan	466,334	5 – Jane Geddes
1986	Pat Bradley	United States	492,021	5 – Pat Bradley
1985	Nancy Lopez	United States	416,472	5 – Nancy Lopez
1984	Betsy King	United States	266,771	4 – Patty Sheehan, Amy Alcott
1983	JoAnne Carner	United States	291,402	4 – Pat Bradley, Patty Sheehan
1982	JoAnne Carner	United States	310,399	5 – JoAnne Carner, Beth Daniel
1981	Beth Daniel	United States	206,975	5 – Donna Caponi
1980	Beth Daniel	United States	230,997	5 – Donna Caponi, JoAnne Carner
1979	Nancy Lopez	United States	197,489	8 – Nancy Lopez
1978	Nancy Lopez	United States	189,814	9 – Nancy Lopez
1977	Judy Rankin	United States	122,890	5 – Judy Rankin, Debbie Austin
1976	Judy Rankin	United States	150,734	6 – Judy Rankin
1975	Sandra Palmer	United States	76,374	4 – Carol Mann, Sandra Haynie
1974	JoAnne Carner	United States	87,094	6 – JoAnne Carner, Sandra Haynie
1973	Kathy Whitworth	United States	82,864	7 – Kathy Whitworth
1972	Kathy Whitworth	United States	65,063	5 – Kathy Whitworth, Jane Blalock
1971	Kathy Whitworth	United States	41,181	5 – Kathy Whitworth
1970	Kathy Whitworth	United States	30,235	4 – Shirley Englehorn
1969	Carol Mann	United States	49,152	8 – Carol Mann
1968	Kathy Whitworth	United States	48,379	10 – Carol Mann, Kathy Whitworth
1967	Kathy Whitworth	United States	32,937	8 – Kathy Whitworth
1966	Kathy Whitworth	United States	33,517	9 – Kathy Whitworth
1965	Kathy Whitworth	United States	28,658	8 – Kathy Whitworth
1964	Mickey Wright	United States	29,800	11 – Mickey Wright
1963	Mickey Wright	United States	31,269	13 – Mickey Wright
1962	Mickey Wright	United States	21,641	10 – Mickey Wright
1961	Mickey Wright	United States	22,236	10 – Mickey Wright
1960	Louise Suggs	United States	16,892	6 – Mickey Wright
1959	Betsy Rawls	United States	26,774	10 – Betsy Rawls
1958	Beverly Hanson	United States	12,639	5 – Mickey Wright
1957	Patty Berg	United States	16,272	5 – Betsy Rawls, Patty Berg
1956	Marlene Hagge	United States	20,235	8 – Marlene Hagge
1955	Patty Berg	United States	16,492	6 – Patty Berg
1954	Patty Berg	United States	16,011	5 – Louise Suggs, Babe Zaharias
1953	Louise Suggs	United States	19,816	8 – Louise Suggs
1952	Betsy Rawls	United States	14,505	8 – Betsy Rawls
1951	Babe Zaharias	United States	15,087	9 – Babe Zaharias
1950	Babe Zaharias	United States	14,800	8 – Babe Zaharias

1 The five players with three titles in 1988 were Juli Inkster, Rosie Jones, Betsy King, Nancy Lopez, and Ayako Okamoto.

== Leading career money winners ==
The table below shows the top-10 career money leaders on the LPGA Tour (from the start of their rookie seasons) as of the 2024 season.

Active players on the Tour are shown in bold.

Rank	Player	Country	Played	Earnings ($)	Career events
1	Annika Sörenstam	Sweden	1994–2023	22,583,693	307
2	**Lydia Ko**	New Zealand	2014–2026	22,360,465	277
3	**Nelly Korda**	United States	2017–2026	22,329,772	177
4	Karrie Webb	Australia	1996–2026	20,293,617	497
5	Cristie Kerr	United States	1997–2025	20,179,848	609
6	**Jeeno Thitikul**	Thailand	2022–2026	19,760,011	100
7	**Minjee Lee**	Australia	2015–2026	19,048,450	264
8	Inbee Park	South Korea	2007–2022	18,262,344	306
9	**Sei Young Kim**	South Korea	2010–2026	17,504,015	262
10	**Amy Yang**	South Korea	2008–2026	16,851,701	387

== Historical total prize money awarded ==
Season	Total purse ($)
2025	133,200,000
2024	123,950,000
2020	41,300,000 (73,500,000)
2010	41,400,000
2000	38,500,000
1990	17,100,000
1980	5,150,000
1970	435,040
1960	186,700
1950	50,000

== See also ==
- Chronological list of LPGA major golf champions
- Golf in the United States
- List of golfers with most LPGA Tour wins
- List of LPGA major championship winning golfers
- Professional Golfers' Association of America
- Professional golf tours
- Women's major golf championships
- Women's World Golf Rankings
- LPGA International
- Women's sports in the United States
