= 1959 LPGA Tour =

Golf tour season

1959 LPGA Tour season
- Duration: January 11, 1959 – September 26, 1959
- Number of official events: 29
- Most wins: 10 (United States) Betsy Rawls
- Money leader: (United States) Betsy Rawls
- Vare Trophy: (United States) Betsy Rawls

The 1959 LPGA Tour was the 10th season since the LPGA Tour officially began in 1950. The season ran from January 11 to September 26. The season consisted of 29 official money events. Betsy Rawls won the most tournaments, 10. She also led the money list with earnings of $26,774.

There was only one first-time winner in 1959, Ruth Jessen.

The tournament results and award winners are listed below.

== Tournament results ==
The following table shows all the official money events for the 1959 season. "Date" is the ending date of the tournament. The numbers in parentheses after the winners' names are the number of wins they had on the tour up to and including that event. Majors are shown in bold.

Date	Tournament	Location	Winner	Score	Purse ($)	1st prize ($)
Jan 13	Mayfair Open	Florida	(United States) Marlene Hagge (16)	225	4,750	831
Jan 18	Tampa Open	Florida	(United States) Ruth Jessen (1)	301	7,500	1,247
Feb 1	MAGA Pro-Am	Florida	(United States) Wiffi Smith (4)	220	5,000	697
Feb 15	St. Petersburg Open	Florida	(United States) Louise Suggs (44)	282	7,500	1,247
Feb 22	Lake Worth Open	Florida	(United States) Betsy Rawls (29)	285	7,500	1,247
Mar 1	Golden Triangle Festival	Florida	(United States) Beverly Hanson (13)	146	3,500	475
Mar 8	Jacksonville Open	Florida	(United States) Mickey Wright (10)	286	5,710	997
Mar 15	**Titleholders Championship**	Georgia	(United States) **Louise Suggs (45)**	297	5,000	1,000
Mar 23	Royal Crown Open	Georgia	(United States) Betsy Rawls (30)	294	5,747	997
Apr 12	Babe Zaharias Open	Texas	(United States) Betsy Rawls (31)	215	5,500	997
Apr 19	Dallas Civitan Open	Texas	(United States) Louise Suggs (46)	287	10,000	1,662
Apr 26	Betsy Rawls Open	South Carolina	(United States) Wiffi Smith (5)	211	5,629	997
May 3	Land of the Sky Open	North Carolina	(United States) Betsy Rawls (32)	215	5,000	997
May 10	Howard Johnson Invitational	North Carolina	(United States) Joyce Ziske (2)	210	5,000	997
May 31	Cavalier Open	Virginia	(United States) Mickey Wright (11)	207	5,500	997
Jun 7	Triangle Round Robin	New Jersey	(United States) Betsy Rawls (33)	+62	9,000	1,425
Jun 14	American Women's Open	Minnesota	(United States) Beverly Hanson (14)	297	7,000	1,247
Jun 27	**U.S. Women's Open**	Pennsylvania	(United States) **Mickey Wright (12)**	287	7,200	1,800
Jul 6	**LPGA Championship**	Indiana	(United States) **Betsy Rawls (34)**	288	7,500	1,247
Jul 9	Hoosier Open	Indiana	(United States) Marlene Hagge (17)	141	4,000	700
Jul 19	Alliance Machine International Open	Ohio	(United States) Mickey Wright (13)	291	10,000	2,090
Jul 26	Mt. Prospect Open	Illinois	(United States) Betsy Rawls (35)	291	20,000	6,175
Aug 16	**Women's Western Open**	Washington	(United States) **Betsy Rawls (36)**	293	7,000	1,247
Aug 23	Spokane Open	Washington	(United States) Beverly Hanson (15)	287	7,500	1,247
Aug 31	Waterloo Open	Iowa	(United States) Betsy Rawls (37)	282	7,000	1,247
Sep 6	Cosmopolitan Open	Illinois	(United States) Kathy Cornelius (3)	214	5,700	997
Sep 13	Memphis Open	Tennessee	(United States) Marilynn Smith (5)	295	7,000	1,250
Sep 20	Links Invitation Open	Georgia	(United States) Beverly Hanson (16)	289	7,500	1,247
Sep 26	Opie Turner Open	Oklahoma	(United States) Betsy Rawls (38)	221	7,500	1,247

== Awards ==
Award	Winner	Country
Money winner	Betsy Rawls (2)	United States
Scoring leader (Vare Trophy)	Betsy Rawls	United States
