= 1951 in sports =

1951 in sports describes the year's events in world sport.

== American football ==
- NFL Championship: the Los Angeles Rams won 24–17 over the Cleveland Browns at the Los Angeles Memorial Coliseum
- January 14 – The National Football League has its first Pro Bowl Game (Los Angeles).
- September 28 – Norm Van Brocklin sets NFL single game record for most passing yards (554) helping Los Angeles Rams beat New York Yanks 48–21.
- Sugar Bowl (1950 season):
  - The Oklahoma Sooners lose 13–7 to the Kentucky Wildcats; still awarded the college football national championship by AP and Coaches Poll

== Association football ==
England

- First Division – Tottenham Hotspur win the 1950–51 title.
- FA Cup – Newcastle United beat Blackpool 2–0.

Spain

- La Liga won by Atlético Madrid

Italy

- Serie A won by Milan.

Germany

- German football championship won by 1. FC Kaiserslautern.

Portugal

- Primeira Liga won by Sporting C.P.

France

- French Division 1 won by Nice.

== Athletics ==
The athletics competition at the 1951 Pan American Games is held in Buenos Aires, Argentina. Mal Whitfield of the USA wins gold medals in three events: 400 m, 800 m and 4 × 400 m relay.

== Australian rules football ==
Victorian Football League

- 29 September − Geelong wins the 55th VFL Premiership defeating Essendon 11.15 (81) to 10.10 (70) in the 1951 VFL Grand Final.
- Brownlow Medal is awarded to Bernie Smith (Geelong)

South Australian National Football League

- 29 September − Port Adelaide wins its fourteenth SANFL premiership, defeating North Adelaide 10.12 (72) to 9.7 (61) after the Magpies lost only one game for the season.
- Magarey Medal awarded to John Marriott (Norwood)

Western Australian National Football League

- October 13 – West Perth wins its eleventh WANFL premiership, beating South Fremantle 13.10 (88) to 12.13 (85)
- Sandover Medal awarded to Fred Buttsworth (West Perth)

== Baseball ==
- January 29 – baseball signs a six-year All-Star game deal for TV and radio rights for $6 million
- September 30 – Joe DiMaggio plays in his final career regular season game.
- October 3 – In one of the most famous finishes in baseball history, Bobby Thomson of the New York Giants hits a three-run walk-off home run, immortalized as the Shot Heard 'Round the World, to give the Giants a 5–4 win over the Brooklyn Dodgers for the National League title.
- World Series – The New York Yankees win 4 games to 2 over the New York Giants.
- Japan Series – The Yomiuri Giants win 4 games to 2 over the Nankai Hawks.

== Basketball ==
- NCAA Men's Basketball Championship –
  - Kentucky wins 68–58 over Kansas.

NBA Finals

- Rochester Royals over New York Knicks (4–3)

Events

- The seventh European basketball championship, Eurobasket 1951, is won by the Soviet Union.

== Boxing ==
- July 10 – Randy Turpin becomes the middleweight boxing champion by defeating Sugar Ray Robinson.
- July 18 – Jersey Joe Walcott knocks out Ezzard Charles in round 7 during their bout in Pittsburgh, Pennsylvania.

== Canadian football ==
- Grey Cup – Ottawa Rough Riders wins 21–14 over the Saskatchewan Roughriders

== Cycling ==
- Giro d'Italia is won by Fiorenzo Magni of Italy
- Tour de France – Hugo Koblet of Switzerland

== Figure skating ==
- World Figure Skating Championships –
  - Men's champion: Dick Button, United States
  - Ladies' champion: Jeannette Altwegg, Great Britain
  - Pair skating champions: Ria Baran & Paul Falk, Germany

== Golf ==
Men's professional

- Masters Tournament – Ben Hogan
- U.S. Open – Ben Hogan
- PGA Championship – Sam Snead
- British Open – Max Faulkner
- PGA Tour money leader – Lloyd Mangrum – $26,089
- Ryder Cup – United States team wins 9 1/2 to 2 1/2 over the British team.

Men's amateur

- British Amateur – Dick Chapman
- U.S. Amateur – Billy Maxwell

Women's professional

- Women's Western Open – Patty Berg
- U.S. Women's Open – Betsy Rawls
- Titleholders Championship – Pat O'Sullivan
- LPGA Tour money leader – Babe Zaharias – $15,087

== Harness racing ==
- Tar Heel, a standardbred horse driven by Del Cameron, runs the first two–minute mile in harness racing history.
- Little Brown Jug for pacers is won by Tar Heel
- Hambletonian for trotters is won by Mainliner
- Australian Inter Dominion Harness Racing Championship –
  - Pacers: Vedette
  - Trotters: Gay Belwin

== Horse racing ==
- July 14 – Citation winds his 32nd race, the Hollywood Gold Cup, becoming the first equine millionaire.

Steeplechases

- Cheltenham Gold Cup – Silver Fame
- Grand National – Nickel Coin

Hurdle races

- Champion Hurdle – Hatton's Grace for the third successive year

Flat races

- Australia – Melbourne Cup is won by Delat
- Canada – King's Plate is won by Major Factor
- France – Prix de l'Arc de Triomphe is won by Tantieme
- Ireland – Irish Derby is won by Fraise du Bois II
- English Triple Crown Races:
  1. 2,000 Guineas Stakes – Ki Ming
  2. The Derby – Arctic Prince
  3. St. Leger Stakes – Talma
- United States Triple Crown Races:
  1. Kentucky Derby – Count Turf
  2. Preakness Stakes – Bold
  3. Belmont Stakes – Counterpoint

== Ice hockey ==
- August 26 – Bill Barilko, Toronto Maple Leafs dies in an air crash
- Art Ross Trophy as the NHL's leading scorer during the regular season: Gordie Howe, Detroit Red Wings
- Hart Memorial Trophy – for the NHL's Most Valuable Player: Milt Schmidt, Boston Bruins
- Stanley Cup – Toronto Maple Leafs win 4 games to 1 over the Montreal Canadiens
- World Hockey Championship
  - Men's champion: Canada's Lethbridge Maple Leafs
- NCAA Men's Ice Hockey Championship – University of Michigan Wolverines defeat Brown University Bruins 7–1 in Colorado Springs, Colorado

== Lacrosse ==
- The 50th anniversaries of the donations of both the Mann Cup and the Minto Cup.
- The Peterborough Timbermen win the 50th Mann Cup.
- The Mimico Mountaineers win the 50th Minto Cup.

== Rugby league ==
- 1950–51 European Rugby League Championship / 1951–52 European Rugby League Championship
- 1951 French rugby league tour of Australia and New Zealand
- 1951 New Zealand rugby league season
- 1951 NSWRFL season
- 1950–51 Northern Rugby Football League season / 1951–52 Northern Rugby Football League season

== Rugby union ==
- 57th Five Nations Championship series is won by Ireland

== Snooker ==
- World Snooker Championship – Fred Davis beats Walter Donaldson 58–39.

== Speed skating ==
Speed Skating World Championships

- Men's All-round Champion – Hjalmar Andersen (Norway)

== Tennis ==
Australia

- Australian Men's Singles Championship – Dick Savitt (USA) defeats Ken McGregor (Australia) 6–3, 2–6, 6–3, 6–1
- Australian Women's Singles Championship – Nancye Wynne Bolton (Australia) defeats Thelma Coyne Long (Australia) 6–1, 7–5

England

- Wimbledon Men's Singles Championship – Dick Savitt (USA) defeats Ken McGregor (Australia) 6–4, 6–4, 6–4
- Wimbledon Women's Singles Championship – Doris Hart (USA) defeats Shirley Fry Irvin (USA) 6–1, 6–0

France

- French Men's Singles Championship – Jaroslav Drobný (Egypt) defeats Eric Sturgess (South Africa) 6–3, 6–3, 6–3
- French Women's Singles Championship – Shirley Fry Irvin (USA) defeats Doris Hart (USA) 6–3, 3–6, 6–3

USA

- American Men's Singles Championship – Frank Sedgman (Australia) defeats Vic Seixas (USA) 6–4, 6–1, 6–1
- American Women's Singles Championship – Maureen Connolly (USA) defeats Shirley Fry Irvin (USA) 6–3, 1–6, 6–4

Davis Cup

- 1951 Davis Cup – Australia 3–2 United States at White City Stadium (grass) Sydney, Australia

== Multi-sport events ==
- First Pan American Games are held in Buenos Aires, Argentina
- Asian Games are held in New Delhi, India
- First Mediterranean Games are held in Alexandria, Egypt

== Awards ==
- Associated Press Male Athlete of the Year – Dick Kazmaier, College football
- Associated Press Female Athlete of the Year – Maureen Connolly, Tennis
