= 1951 LPGA Tour =

Golf tour season

1951 LPGA Tour season
- Duration: January 5, 1951 – October 19, 1951
- Number of official events: 19
- Most wins: 9 (United States) Babe Zaharias
- Money leader: (United States) Babe Zaharias ($15,087)

The 1951 LPGA Tour was the second season since the LPGA Tour officially began in 1950. The season ran from January 5 to October 19. The season consisted of 19 official money events. Babe Zaharias won the most tournaments, nine. She also led the money list with earnings of $15,087.

There were two first-time winners in 1951, Pat O'Sullivan, an amateur, and Betsy Rawls, who won 55 LPGA events in her career.

The tournament results are listed below.

== Tournament results ==
The following table shows all the official money events for the 1951 season. "Date" is the ending date of the tournament. The numbers in parentheses after the winners' names are the number of wins they had on the tour up to and including that event. Majors are shown in bold.

Date	Tournament	Location	Winner	Score	Purse ($)	1st prize ($)
Jan 7	Ponte Vedra Beach Women's Open	Florida	(United States) Babe Zaharias (19)	223	3,000	750
Jan 21	Tampa Women's Open	Florida	(United States) Babe Zaharias (20)	288	3,500	1,000
Mar 18	**Titleholders Championship**	Georgia	(United States) **Pat O'Sullivan** (a) **(1*)**	301	1,500	
Mar 26	Sandhills Women's Open	North Carolina	(United States) Patty Berg (17)	221	3,000	750
Apr 15	Lakewood Weathervane	Texas	(United States) Babe Zaharias (21)	149	3,000	750
Apr 23	Richmond Women's Open	California	(United States) Babe Zaharias (22)	224	3,000	750
Apr 24	Sacramento Women's Invitational Open	California	(United States) Betsy Rawls (1)	72	2,000	225
May 1	Valley Open	California	(United States) Babe Zaharias (23)	225	3,000	750
May 6	Pebble Beach Weathervane	California	(United States) Patty Berg (18)	152	3,000	750
May 20	Meridian Hills Weathervane	Indiana	(United States) Babe Zaharias (24)	145	3,000	750
May 27	New York Weathervane	New York	(United States) Patty Berg (19)	149	3,000	750
Jun 15	144 Hole Weathervane	New York	(United States) Patty Berg (20)	601	7,500	5,000
Jun 21	**Women's Western Open**	Pennsylvania	(United States) **Patty Berg (21)**	2 up		
Jul 1	Eastern Open	Pennsylvania	(United States) Beverly Hanson (2)	215	3,500	1,000
Aug 7	All American Open	Illinois	(United States) Babe Zaharias (25)	298	5,500	2,100
Aug 12	World Championship	Illinois	(United States) Babe Zaharias (26)	295		1,000
Sep 9	Carrollton Georgia Open	Georgia	(United States) Louise Suggs (9)	221	3,000	750
Sep 16	**U.S. Women's Open**	Georgia	(United States) **Betsy Rawls (2)**	293	7,500	
Oct 19	Texas Women's Open	Texas	(United States) Babe Zaharias (27)	7 & 6		

(a) - amateur
* - non-member at time of win
