= 1964 Titleholders Championship =

Golf tournament in Augusta, Georgia, US

Tournament information
- Dates: April 23–26, 1964
- Location: Augusta, Georgia; 33.483°N 82.011°W
- Course: Augusta Country Club
- Tour: LPGA Tour
- Format: Stroke play – 72 holes

Statistics
- Par: 72
- Length: 6,300 yards (5,760 m)
- Prize fund: $7,500
- Winner's share: $1,300

Champion
- (United States) Marilynn Smith
- 289 (+1)
- Location in the United States Location in Georgia

The 1964 Titleholders Championship was the 25th Titleholders Championship, held April 23–26 at Augusta Country Club in Augusta, Georgia.

Reigning champion Marilynn Smith successfully defended her title, one stroke ahead of runner-up Mickey Wright. The two had met in an 18-hole playoff the previous year which was decided on the final green. Wright had won the title in 1961 and 1962. It was the second and final major title for Smith.

Smith's total of 289 was two strokes better than the previous record of 291 set by Patty Berg in 1955. Her second round 66 (−6) on Friday helped her set several other records for the championship, including lowest round, lowest score after 36 holes at 139 (−5), and 54 holes at 216 (even). Her Friday inward nine score of 31 was also a record, by two strokes.

In the third round on Saturday, scores soared in the rain and cold wind. Smith's 77 (+5) kept the lead at an even-par 216 for 54 holes, three shots ahead of Wright.

== Final leaderboard ==
Sunday, April 26, 1964

Place	Player	Score	To par	Money ($)
1	(United States) Marilynn Smith	73-66-77-73=289	+1	1,300
2	(United States) Mickey Wright	74-70-75-71=290	+2	1,000
3	(United States) Betsy Rawls	71-77-74-72=294	+6	800
T4	(United States) Ruth Jessen	77-72-74-73=296	+8	625
T4	(United States) Judy Kimball	71-72-78-75=296	+8	625
T6	(United States) Clifford Ann Creed	75-69-79-74=297	+9	500
T6	(United States) Shirley Englehorn	75-75-73-74=297	+9	500
8	(United States) Mary Mills	74-74-78-72=298	+10	400
9	(United States) Louise Suggs	73-73-76-77=299	+11	350
T10	(United States) Marlene Hagge	75-72-78-75=300	+12	275
T10	(United States) Sandra Haynie	74-75-76-75=300	+12	275
T10	(United States) Judy Rankin	75-73-76-76=300	+12	275
