= 2025 U.S. Senior Women's Open =

Golf tournament

Tournament information
- Dates: August 21–24, 2025
- Location: Chula Vista, California, U.S. 32°37′22″N 117°3′46″W
- Course: San Diego Country Club
- Organized by: USGA
- Tour: Legends Tour
- Format: 72 holes stroke play

Statistics
- Par: 73
- Length: 6,219 yards (5,687 m)
- Field: 120 players
- Cut: 154 (+8) (low 50 scorers and ties)
- Prize fund: $1,000,000
- Winner's share: $200,000

Champion
- (Wales) Becky Morgan
- Location in the United States Location in California

The 2025 U.S. Senior Women's Open took place August 21–24 at San Diego Country Club in Chula Vista, California, and was the seventh U.S. Senior Women's Open. It was a professional golf tournament organized by the United States Golf Association (USGA), open to women over 50 years of age and one of two yearly senior women's major golf championships.

== Venue ==
The club was founded in 1897. After the club moved to Chula Vista in 1920, architect William Watson designed the first all-grass 18-hole golf course in Southern California.

The club had previously hosted the 1964 U.S. Women's Open (won by Mickey Wright at her home club), the 1993 U.S. Women's Amateur (won by Jill McGill, exempt for this tournament via her first professional win at this tournament in 2022) and the 2017 U.S. Women's Amateur (won by Sophia Schubert).

=== Course layout ===
The length was different between each round. Approximate length shown.

Hole	Yards	Par	Hole	Yards	Par
1	363	4	10	438	5
2	466	5	11	139	3
3	182	3	12	363	4
4	391	4	13	162	3
5	373	4	14	475	5
6	140	3	15	371	4
7	338	4	16	507	5
8	502	5	17	326	4
9	335	4	18	348	4
Out	3,090	36	In	3,129	37
			Total	6,219	73

== Format ==
The walking-only tournament was played over 72 holes of stroke play, with the top 50 and ties making the 36-hole cut.

== Field ==
The championship was open to any professional or amateur golfer who was 50 years of age or over as of August 21, 2025, however restricted by a certain handicap level.

Players enter the competition, either exempt through some of several exemption categories or through sectional qualifying at 16 different sites around the United States during 2025. (Note: (a) – denotes amateur)

=== Exempt from qualifying ===
Below are listed exemption categories and players exempt, if any, under those. Each exemption category requires players to have reached their 50th birthday on or before August 21, 2025. Players exempt under more than one category are mentioned only under the first category they are exempt.

1. Former winners of the U.S. Senior Women's Open (10-year exemption)

- Laura Davies, Helen Alfredsson, Annika Sörenstam, Jill McGill, Trish Johnson, Leta Lindley

2. From the 2024 U.S. Senior Women's Open, the 20 lowest scorers and anyone tying for 20th place

- Kaori Yamamoto, Nobuko Kizawa, Mikino Kubo, Juli Inkster, Christa Johnson, Junko Omote, Corina Kelepouris, Stefania Croce, Maggie Will, Pat Hurst, Moira Dunn-Bohls, Liselotte Neumann, Yuko Saito, Brandie Burton, Lisa Grimes, Michele Redman, Maria McBride, Suzy Green Roebuck, Catrin Nilsmark

3. From the 2024 U.S. Senior Women's Open, the amateur(s) returning the lowest 72-hole score

4. Winners of the U.S. Women's Open (10-year exemption)

- Amy Alcott, Jerilyn Britz (did not play), Jane Geddes, JoAnne Gunderson Carner (did not play), Hollis Stacy, Jan Stephenson (did not play), Karrie Webb

5. From the 2024 and 2025 U.S. Women's Open, any player returning a 72-hole score

6. Any professional or applicant for reinstatement who has won the U.S. Women's Amateur (three-year exemption)

- Silvia Cavalleri, Wendy Ward, Vickie Goetze-Ackerman

7. Winners of the U.S. Women's Amateur (must be an amateur; five-year exemption)

8. Winners of the 2023 and 2024 U.S. Senior Women's Amateur and the 2024 runner-up (must be an amateur)

- Sarah Gallagher, Nadene Gole (a), Shelly Stouffer (a)

9. Winners of the 2023 and 2024 U.S. Women's Mid-Amateur (must be an amateur)

10. Playing members of the two most current United States and Great Britain & Ireland Curtis Cup Teams, and the two most current United States Women's World Amateur teams (must be an amateur)

11. Winners of the LPGA Legends Championship, formerly known as the LPGA Senior Championship, from 2019 to 2025, and the runners-up from 2023 to 2025

12. From the 2025 LPGA Legends Championship, the 10 lowest scorers and anyone tying for 10th place

- Heather Bowie Young, Laura Diaz, Becky Morgan

13. From the final 2024 Legends of the LPGA Performance Points list, the top 30 point leaders and ties

- Jean Bartholomew, Clarissa Childs, Jamie Fischer, Jackie Gallagher-Smith, Tammie Green, Nicole Jeray, Cathy Johnston-Forbes, Patricia Meunier-Lebouc

14. Winners of the Legends of the LPGA co-sponsored events, with a minimum of 36 holes, excluding team events, whose victories are considered official, in 2023 and 2024 and during the current calendar year to the initiation of the current year's U.S. Senior Women's Open Championship

15. Winners of the 2019-2024 LPGA Professionals Championship (Championship Division), and the five lowest scorers and ties from the 2024 Championship

16. From the 2024 LPGA Professionals Championship (Senior Division), the three lowest scorers and ties

- Christy Longfield

17. Winners of the 2024 R&A Women's Senior Amateur and 2024 Canadian Women's Senior Amateur Championships (must be an amateur)

18. Winners of the following events when deemed a major by the LPGA Tour: The Chevron Championship (1983–present); Evian Championship (2013–present); AIG Women's British Open (1979–present); KPMG Women's PGA Championship (1955–present); Titleholders Championship (1946-1966 and 1972); and/or Western Open (1930–1967) (10-year exemption)

- Donna Andrews (did not play) Catriona Matthew

19. From the LPGA Tour Career Official Money List, the top 10 players who are not otherwise exempt as of February 12, 2025

- Rosie Jones, Sophie Gustafson (did not play), Carin Hjalmarsson, Janice Moodie, Danielle Ammaccapane, Michelle McGann

20. Winners of LPGA Tour co-sponsored events, whose victories are considered official, from 2019 to 2024 and during the current calendar year to the initiation of the 2025 U.S. Senior Women's Open Championship

21. Playing members of the United States and European Solheim Cup Teams within the last 10 years (2015–2024)

- Gwladys Nocera

22. From the 2024 final Ladies European Tour and Japan LPGA Tour career money lists, the top five money leaders

23. Special exemptions as selected by the USGA

=== Qualifying sites ===
Additional players qualified through sectional qualifying tournaments, taking place June 18 – July 28, 2025, at 16 different sites across the United States.

Date	Location	Venue	Qualifiers
Jun 18	Salisbury, North Carolina	Country Club of Salisbury	Lee Ann Walker, Charlaine Hirst, Julie Streng (a), Kathy Hartwiger (a), Ashli Bunch Alternates: Dawn Woodard (a) (entered), Patrice Rizzo
Jun 18	Irving, Texas	The Nelson Golf & Sports Club (TPC Course)	Kelley Nittoli (a), Julie Harrison (a), Martha Linscott (a) Alternates: Susie Redman, D'Lynn McCoppin (a)
Jun 23	Schererville, Indiana	Briar Ridge Country Club	Ellen Port (a), Margie Muzik, Abby Pearson Alternates: Tracy Hanson (entered), Lieschen Wienke
Jun 23	Scottsdale, Arizona	Terravita Golf & Country Club	Kim Shek (a), Robin Krapfl (a), Kaori Higo Alternates: Char Carson (entered), Amy Fruhwirth
Jul 1	Morristown, New Jersey	Spring Brook Country Club	Sylvie Schetagne, Alicia Dibos, Julie Piers Alternates: Melissa Dziabo (entered), C.J. Reeves
Jul 7	Woodburn, Oregon	OGA Golf Course	Lara Tennant, Eriko Gejo, Sara Griffin Alternates: Kaori Shimura, Tomoko Suzuki
Jul 7	West Covina, California	South Hills Country Club	Shelly Haywood (a), Eunice Cho (a), Sherry Wright (a), Hiroko Oga (a), Corey Weworski (a), Angela Buzminski, Kim Izzi (a) Alternates: Amy Stubblefield (entered), Kathy Kurata (a)
Jul 9	Powell, Ohio	Wedgewood Golf & Country Club	Judith Kyrinis (a), Audra Burks, Cheryl Fox, Elaine Crosby Alternates: Martha Leach (a) (entered), Christine Lindsey
Jul 10	Atlanta, Georgia	Capital City Club (Brookhaven Course)	Brenda Corrie-Kuehn (a), Caroline Smith, Barbara Moxness Alternates: Kyoko Suganuma, Tonya Gill Danckaert
Jul 10	Danville, California	Diablo Country Club	Karen Garcia (a), Yuka Shiroto, Tina Barker, Eika Otake Alternates: Tomi Marcus (a), Jenny Park-Choi
Jul 10	Newport News, Virginia	James River Country Club	Lisa Depaulo, Patricia Beliard Alternates: Kimbra Benson (a), Olivia Hernandez (a)
Jul 11	Lake Elmo, Minnesota	Royal Golf Club	Chiaki Nagano, Karen Weiss Alternates: Chie Furusawa (entered), Tina Lindsey
Jul 16	Vero Beach, Florida	Indian River Club	Charlotta Sörenstam, Sue Ginter Landry, Laurel Kean, Pamela Elders, Emma Leonardi, Pat Shriver Alternates: Smriti Mehra, Gail Graham
Jul 21	King of Prussia, Pennsylvania	Gulph Mills Club	Tara Joy-Connelly (a), Janie Sirmons, Amy E. Phelan (a), Stephenie Harris (a) Alternates: Tina Paternostro, Angela Ause (a)
Jul 22	Colorado Springs, Colorado	Country Club of Colorado	Kristine Franklin (a), Stacy Slobodnik-Stoll (a), Yukako Matsumoto, Sherry Andonian, Kelly Green (a) Alternates: Linda Jeffery (a), Laurie Brower
Jul 28	Wellesley, Massachusetts	Wellesley Country Club	Laura Shanahan Rowe, Jayne Pardus (a), Lisa McGill (a) Alternates: Mercedes Large (a), Tracy Welch (a)

== Round summaries ==
=== First round ===
Thursday, August 21, 2025

Place	Player	Score	To par
1	(Sweden) Annika Sörenstam	70	−3
T2	(United States) Moira Dunn-Bohls	71	−2
T2	(United States) Lara Tennant (a)	71	−2
T2	(United States) Barb Moxness	71	−2
T5	(England) Trish Johnson	72	−1
T5	(Canada) Corina Kelepouris	72	−1
T7	(Italy) Silvia Cavalleri	73	E
T7	(Japan) Mikuno Kubo	73	E
T7	(United States) Leta Lindley	73	E
T7	(Sweden) Liselotte Neumann	73	E
T7	(Sweden) Maria McBride	73	E
T7	(United States) Michelle Redman	73	E
T7	(Australia) Karrie Webb	73	E

=== Second round ===
Friday, August 22, 2025

51 players, 46 professionals and five amateurs, made the cut at eight over par (+8), 154. All players who missed the cut were paid $2,000 each, including amateurs, whose prize money by 2022 USGA rule is classified as expenses towards playing in the tournament itself such as transportation and lodging, including name, image, and likeness (all permitted by the 2022 rule).

Place	Player	Score	To par
1	(Wales) Becky Morgan	74-68=142	−4
T2	(Canada) Corina Kelepouris	72-71=143	−3
T2	(Sweden) Maria McBride	73-70=143	−3
T4	(United States) Ashli Bunch	75-69=144	−2
T4	(United States) Moira Dunn-Bohls	71-73=144	−2
T4	(Sweden) Liselotte Neumann	73-71=144	−2
7	(United States) Laura Diaz	74-71=145	−1
8	(United States) Leta Lindley	73-73=146	E
9	(England) Trish Johnson	72-75=147	+1
T10	(United States) Sherry Andonian	75-73=148	+2
T10	(United States) Audra Burks	76-72=148	+2
T10	(United States) Tammie Green	74-74=148	+2
T10	(United States) Juli Inkster	75-73=148	+2
T10	(Japan) Mikuno Kubo	73-75=148	+2
T10	(Japan) Yuko Saito	74-74=148	+2
T10	(Sweden) Annika Sörenstam	70-78=148	+2
T10	(United States) Lara Tennant (a)	71-77=148	+2

=== Third round ===
Saturday, August 23, 2025

Place	Player	Score	To par
T1	(Canada) Corina Kelepouris	72-71-72=215	−4
T1	(Sweden) Maria McBride	73-70-72=215	−4
T1	(Wales) Becky Morgan	74-68-73=215	−4
T4	(United States) Ashli Bunch	75-69-74=218	−1
T4	(Sweden) Liselotte Neumann	73-71-74=218	−1
T6	(United States) Juli Inkster	75-73-72=220	+1
T6	(England) Trish Johnson	72-75-73=220	+1
T6	(United States) Leta Lindley	73-73-74=220	+1
T9	(United States) Barb Moxness	71-79-71=221	+2
T9	(United States) Michelle Redman	73-76-72=221	+2

=== Fourth round ===
Sunday, August 24, 2025

After being tied leader before the final round, Becky Morgan shot the lowest round of the final day and won the championship by six strokes. Lara Tennant finished low amateur at tied 18th, with a score of 9 over par 301. Defending champion Leta Lindley finished tied fourth, eight strokes behind the winner.

Place	Play	Score	To par	Money ($)
1	(Wales) Becky Morgan	74-68-73-70=285	−7	200,000
2	(United States) Juli Inkster	75-73-72-71=291	−1	108,000
3	(Sweden) Liselotte Neumann	73-71-74-74=292	E	66,228
T4	(Canada) Corina Kelepouris	72-71-72-78=293	+1	39,455
T4	(United States) Leta Lindley	73-73-74-73=293	+1	39,455
T4	(Sweden) Maria McBride	73-70-72-78=293	+1	39,455
7	(England) Trish Johnson	72-75-73-74=294	+2	30,730
T8	(Scotland) Janice Moodie	74-76-74-71=295	+3	26,222
T8	(Sweden) Annika Sörenstam	70-78-75-72=295	+3	26,222
10	(Japan) Mikuno Kubo	73-75-76-73=297	+5	22,781
