= Murle Breer =

American professional golfer

Personal information
- Full name: Murle MacKenzie Lindstrom Breer
- Nationality: United States
- Born: January 20, 1939 (age 87) St. Petersburg, Florida, U.S.
- Height: 5 ft 5.5 in (1.66 m)
- Spouses: Robert Breer; Fred Lindstrom
- Children: Tracy, Vicki

Career
- Sport: Golf
- College: St. Petersburg Junior College
- Turned professional: 1958
- Former tour: LPGA Tour (1958-84)
- Professional wins: 5

Number of wins by tour
- LPGA Tour: 4
- Other: 1

Best results in LPGA major championships (wins: 1)
- Western Open: T8: 1959
- Titleholders C'ship: 11th: 1962
- Chevron Championship: DNP
- Women's PGA C'ship: 4th: 1970
- U.S. Women's Open: Won: 1962
- du Maurier Classic: T47: 1981

Murle MacKenzie Lindstrom Breer (born January 20, 1939) is an American professional golfer best known for winning the 1962 U.S. Women's Open. She competed as Murle MacKenzie until her first marriage in 1961, then as Murle Lindstrom until her second marriage in 1969.

== Career ==
Breer was born in St. Petersburg, Florida. She joined the LPGA Tour in 1958. Her first Tour victory came in a major championship in 1962, when she defeated Jo Ann Prentice and Ruth Jessen by one stroke in the U.S. Women's Open which was held at the Dunes Golf Club in Myrtle Beach, South Carolina. Breer enjoyed three more Tour victories in the 1960s and one mixed team win in the 1970s. She retired as a touring professional in 1984.

For more than two decades, Breer has run a golf school at High Hampton Inn Country Club in western North Carolina.

== Personal life ==
She and husband, Robert, an aeronautical engineer, have two daughters, Tracy and Vicki.

== Professional wins ==
=== LPGA Tour wins (4) ===
Legend
LPGA Tour major championships (1)
Other LPGA Tour (3)

No.	Date	Tournament	Winning score	Margin of victory	Runner(s)-up
1	Jun 30, 1962	U.S. Women's Open	+13 (78-74-76-73=301)	2 strokes	(United States) Ruth Jessen (United States) Jo Ann Prentice
2	Nov 4, 1962	San Antonio Civitan	−3 (74-70-69=213)	3 strokes	(United States) Betsy Rawls
3	Oct 22, 1967	Carlsbad Jaycee Open	E (77-72-67=216)	1 stroke	(United States) Sandra Haynie
4	Jun 2, 1969	O'Sullivan Ladies Open	−5 (66-71-71=208)	3 strokes	(United States) Shirley Englehorn

=== Other wins ===
- 1979 JCPenney Mixed Team Classic (with Dave Eichelberger)

== Major championships ==
=== Wins (1) ===
Year	Championship	Winning score	Margin	Runners-up
1962	U.S. Women's Open	+13 (78-74-76-73=301)	2 strokes	(United States) Ruth Jessen, (United States) Jo Ann Prentice
