= Judy Kimball =

American professional golfer

Personal information
- Full name: Judy Kimball Simon
- Nationality: United States
- Born: June 17, 1938 (age 88) Sioux City, Iowa, U.S.

Career
- Sport: Golf
- College: University of Kansas, 1960
- Turned professional: 1961
- Former tour: LPGA Tour (1961–88)
- Professional wins: 5

Number of wins by tour
- LPGA Tour: 3
- Other: 2

Best results in LPGA major championships (wins: 1)
- Western Open: T2: 1964
- Titleholders C'ship: T2: 1966
- Chevron Championship: DNP
- Women's PGA C'ship: Won: 1962
- U.S. Women's Open: T11: 1963
- du Maurier Classic: CUT: 1981

Judy Kimball Simon (born June 17, 1938) is an American professional golfer, best known for winning the LPGA Championship in 1962, a women's major championship.

== Amateur career ==
Born in Sioux City, Iowa, Kimball graduated from the University of Kansas in 1960. She was Iowa State Amateur champion in 1958 and a semifinalist in the 1959 Trans-Miss and the 1960 Western Amateur. She was also the low amateur at the Waterloo Women's Open Invitational in 1958.

== Professional career ==
Kimball turned professional in 1961 and won three LPGA tournaments, including the LPGA Championship in 1962. She was inducted into the Iowa Golf Hall of Fame in 1993 and the Iowa Sports Hall of Fame in 1997.

== Amateur wins ==
- 1958 Iowa State Women's Amateur

== Professional wins ==
=== LPGA Tour wins (3) ===
Legend
LPGA Tour major championships (1)
Other LPGA Tour (2)

No.	Date	Tournament	Winning score	To par	Margin of victory	Runner-up
1	Jul 30, 1961	American Women's Open	73-75-73-74=295	−5	2 strokes	(United States) Betsy Rawls
2	Oct 7, 1962	LPGA Championship	70-69-71-72=282	−2	4 strokes	(United States) Shirley Spork
3	Jul 25, 1971	O'Sullivan Ladies Open	71-68-72=211	−5	1 stroke	(Australia) Margie Masters

=== Other wins (2) ===
- 1966 Yankee Women's Open (with Gloria Ehret)
- 1971 LPGA Four-Ball Championship (with Kathy Whitworth)

== Major championships ==
=== Wins (1) ===
Year	Championship	Winning score	Margin	Runner-up
1962	LPGA Championship	−2 (70-69-71-72=282)	4 strokes	(United States) Shirley Spork

== See also ==
- Chronological list of LPGA major golf champions
- List of golfers with most LPGA major championship wins
