= 1952 Women's Western Open =

Golf tournament

Coordinates: 42°07′42″N 87°45′43″W

Tournament information
- Dates: June 16–21, 1952
- Location: Glencoe, Illinois
- Course: Skokie Country Club
- Tour: LPGA Tour
- Format: Stroke play/match play

Statistics
- Par: 75
- Length: 6,520 yards (5,960 m)
- Field: 128 players, 32 to match play
- Cut: 88 (+13)
- Prize fund: $1,500
- Winner's share: $1,000

Champion
- Betsy Rawls
- def. Betty Jameson, 1 up
- Location within the United States Location within Illinois

The 1952 Women's Western Open was a golf competition held at Skokie Country Club in Glencoe, Illinois from June 16–21. It was the 23rd edition of the Women's Western Open.

The field of 128 golfers played an 18-hole qualifying round to determine the 32 players advancing to match play. Betsy Rawls won medalist honors with a qualifying round of 74 (−1). Match play was over 18 holes for each round except the 36-hole final. After the first round of match play, seven professional and nine amateur golfers remained in the field.

Betsy Rawls won the championship in match play competition by defeating Betty Jameson in the final match, 1 up. Rawls earned $1,000 and Jameson earned $500 from the $1,500 purse.

== Final 16 bracket ==
Round of 16; June 18
Betsy Rawls	5&4
Louise Anneaux (a)
Peggy Kirk	4&3
Pat Leith (a)
Louise Suggs	3&1
Marilynn Smith
Mary Lena Faulk (a)	1up
Betty MacKinnon
Patty Berg	2up
Carol Diringer (a)
Betty Jameson	7&6
Patricia Devany (a)
Barbara McIntire (a)	3&2
Bonnie Randolph (a)
Barbara Romack (a)	6&4
Mary Ann Villegas (a)

Quarterfinals; June 19
Betsy Rawls	2up
Peggy Kirk
Louise Suggs	5&4
Mary Lena Faulk (a)
Patty Berg
Betty Jameson	5&3
Barbara McIntire (a)
Barbara Romack (a)	4&3

Semifinals; June 20
Betsy Rawls	2&1
Louise Suggs
Betty Jameson	4&3
Barbara Romack (a)

Finals; June 21
Betsy Rawls	1up
Betty Jameson
