= 1962 LPGA Championship =

Coordinates: 36.128°N 115.125°W

Tournament information
- Dates: October 4–7, 1962
- Location: Las Vegas, Nevada
- Course: Stardust Country Club
- Tour: LPGA Tour
- Format: Stroke play – 72 holes

Statistics
- Par: 71
- Length: 6,000 yards (5,490 m)
- Field: 30 players
- Cut: none
- Prize fund: $15,000
- Winner's share: $2,300

Champion
- (United States) Judy Kimball
- 282 (−2)

Location in the United States
Location in Nevada

The 1962 LPGA Championship was the eighth LPGA Championship, held October 4–7 at Stardust Country Club in Las Vegas, Nevada.

Judy Kimball, age 24, shot a final round 72 (+1) to win her only major title, four strokes ahead of runner-up Shirley Spork. The winner's share was $2,300 and second place earned $1,850. Kimball's 282 set a new record for the championship, three strokes ahead of Louise Suggs' 285 in 1957. Two-time defending champion Mickey Wright fell short in search of her third consecutive LPGA Championship; she finished thirteen strokes back in eighth place, but won her fourth LPGA Championship the following year.

It was the second of six consecutive LPGA Championships at Stardust, which opened the previous year. After several ownership and name changes, it became Las Vegas National Golf Club in 1998.

== Final leaderboard ==
Sunday, October 7, 1962

Place	Player	Score	To par
1	(United States) Judy Kimball	70-69-71-72=282	−2
2	(United States) Shirley Spork	75-68-71-72=286	+2
3	(United States) Mary Lena Faulk	73-74-71-69=287	+3
T4	(United States) Carol Mann	74-72-71-73=290	+6
T4	(United States) Kathy Whitworth	73-71-75-71=290	+6
6	(United States) Kathy Cornelius	71-73-74-73=291	+7
7	(United States) Marilynn Smith	77-76-73-68=294	+10
8	(United States) Mickey Wright	77-75-73-70=295	+11
T9	(United States) Jo Ann Prentice	74-73-76-73=296	+12
T9	(United States) Jackie Pung	77-75-72-72=296	+12
