= Skokie Country Club =

Private country club in Chicago, Illinois

Coordinates: 42°07′42″N 87°45′43″W

- Interactive map of Skokie Country Club

Club information
- Location: Glencoe, Illinois, USA
- Type: Private
- Tota holes: 18
- Website: Skokie Country Club
- Designed by: Thomas Bendelow
- Par: 72
- Length: 7091
- Course rating: 74.3

Skokie Country Club is a private country club in Glencoe, Illinois, a suburb of Chicago.

Founded in 1897, it features a 7091-yard 18-hole course. In 1922, it hosted the U.S. Open that was won by Gene Sarazen. Phil Gaudin was serving as the head professional at Skokie Country Club when it hosted the 1922 U.S. Open. It has also hosted the 1909 Western Open, the 1952 Women's Western Open, the 1998 U.S. Senior Amateur, the 2010 Western Amateur, and the 2017 Western Amateur.

The original course was designed by Tom Bendelow in 1904. It was turned into a Donald Ross course in 1914 when he redesigned it. Then in 1938 William Langford substantially reworked the layout with respect paid to the integrity of Ross's intentions.

Walter Fovargue served as the head professional in the early 1900s and remained there until 1916.
