= Connecticut Golf Hall of Fame =

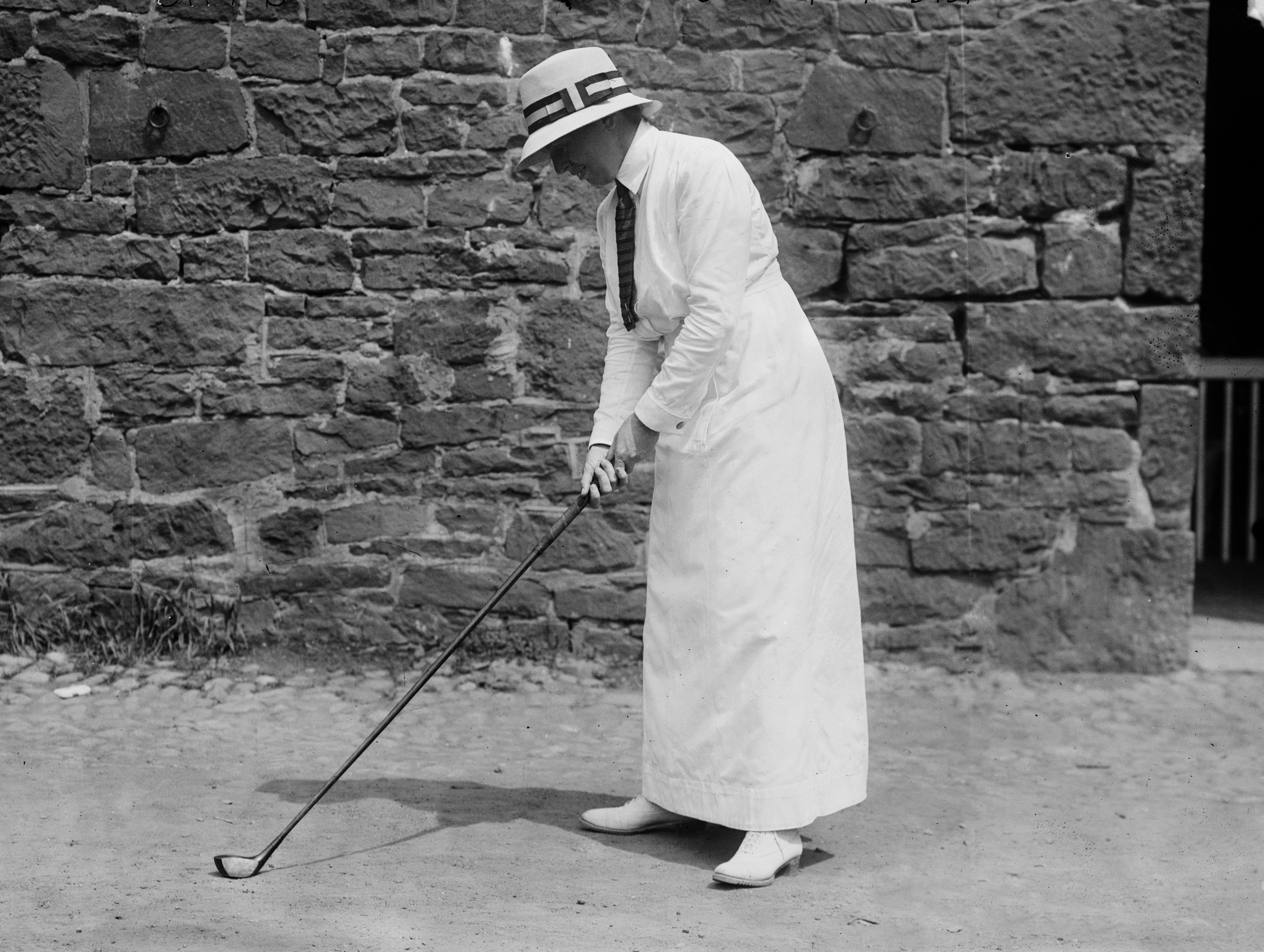
Georgianna Bishop in 1914

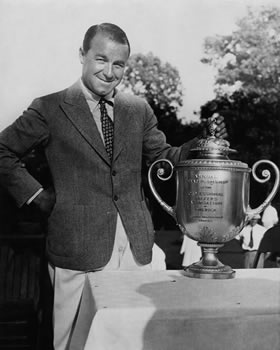
Gene Sarazen in 1939

The Connecticut Golf Hall of Fame honors people with connections to the state of Connecticut for their achievements and contributions in the sport of golf. The Hall of Fame was created in the mid-1950s by noted local golf journalist Skip Henderson. The event was originally organized by Greater Hartford Jaycees and the Connecticut Sports Writers' Alliance. During the first phase of the ceremony, the award was bestowed equally to obscure amateurs and famous professional golfers. By the 1980s, however, the Hall was disestablished. However, in 1991, under the auspices of the Connection State Golf Association, the Hall of Fame induction ceremony was renewed.

== History ==
In November 1954, The Hartford Times sportswriter Charles Stuart "Skip" Henderson, Jr. brought up the idea of creating a state golf Hall of Fame to the Greater Hartford Jaycees. The organization was instituted the following February. The organization was created through a collaboration between the Jaycees and the Connecticut Sports Writers' Alliance. The purpose of the Hall of Fame, it was later described, was to "[recognize] an individual who has state connections, participated in a golf-related activity in Connecticut and has brought honor through golf endeavors at the state, regional, or national levels."

The first induction ceremony was held at the Golf Club of Avon in April 1955. It was held during the third annual Connecticut PGA Spring Golf Show. The selection was completed by the sportswriters of Connecticut. Robert M. Grant was the unanimous choice for the award. Grant was a leading amateur golfer and president of the Connection State Golf Association (CSGA), the New England Golf Association, and Wethersfield Country Club. In 1956, the ceremony began to be held at Wethersfield Country Club after the conclusion of the Insurance City Open, a local PGA Tour event held at the club. The selections continued to be determined by the Connecticut Sports Writers Alliance.

In the early years, the awards' distribution alternated between star professional golfers and obscure local golfers. After Grant's selection, local amateur golfers Charles C. Clare, W.W. "Mike" Sherman, and Frank D. Ross won the award. In 1959, the award went to pathbreaking female golfer Georgianna Bishop. In 1960, electrician and former Connecticut Amateur champion, H.H. Mandly won the award. Following that, legendary golfers Julius Boros and Gene Sarazen won the award consecutively. Immediately thereafter, former U.S. Open champions Billy Burke and Tony Manero earned Hall of Fame honors in respective years.

By the late 1960s, the ceremony moved to Glastonbury Hills Country Club in Glastonbury, Connecticut and then Elmhurst Country Club in East Longmeadow, Massachusetts. During this era, the award was bestowed upon Dr. Ted Lenczyk, a dentist and former Connecticut Open champion, and his sister, Grace Lenczyk Cronin, a star amateur golfer in the 1940s. In the early 1970s, the ceremony returned to the Golf Club of Avon. Despite the changes in location, the awards ceremony was consistently conducted at the annual Connecticut PGA Spring Golf Show. During this era, the event was still sponsored by the Jaycees and the election process was consistently decided by the local sportswriters. In late 1983, however, the ceremony ceased to exist.

In 1991 the awards were "reinstituted." The CSGA, not the sportswriters, now "assumed administration" of the ceremony. During this era, several CSGA executives earned honors. In 1991, former executive for the CSGA, Marty Moraghan, earned the award. "I can't tell you what this means to me," said Moraghan, "to be in the same company as Dick Siderowf and Bobby Grant is something I'll never forget." The following year, Jim Killington, another executive for the association, was inducted. In 1997, former CSGA executive director Russ Palmer was inducted. Palmer was instrumental in merging the CSGA with Connection Section PGA.

In the early 21st century, a number of awards were distributed posthumously to early 20th century golf figures. In 2000 and 2001, the award was dispensed, respectively, to leading 1920s professional Johnny Golden, and the amateur Dick Chapman, former U.S. Amateur and British Amateur champion. In 2005, Skip Henderson, the sportswriter who originated the idea of a Hall of Fame, was selected for the award.

== Inductees ==
Year	Inductee
2024	Jack Bracken III, Joan Joyce, Del Kinney Jr.
2023	Elizabeth Janangelo Caron
2022	Andy Bessette, Bruce Edwards
2021	Suzy Whaley, Mike Ballo Jr., James A. Becker
2020	Genevieve Hecker
2019	Stan McFarland
2018	John Paesani, Dr. Bob Ruby
2017	Malcolm McLachlan, Tim Petrovic
2016	Jeff Hedden, Tom Gleeton
2015	J. J. Henry, Richard J. Zanini
2014	Roy Pace, Betty Boyko, Ted May
2013	Bruce Guthrie
2012	Bill Hermanson, Thomas W. Lane, Angela Aulenti
2011	Ron "Red" Smith, Gary Reynolds, Art Williams
2010	Dave Szewczul, Heather Daly-Donofrio, Bob Hopkins
2009	Bruce Berlet, Fran Marrello, Barbara Young
2008	Dick Mayer, William T. “Bill” Lee, E.B. “Pete” Broadbent
2007	Leslie Shannon Stewart, William Hadden III, Frank Selva
2006	Ken Green, Richard M. "Dick" Tettelbach
2005	Doug Dalziel, Skip Henderson
2004	Sanford P. Young
2003	John A. Gentile,
2002	Allan Breed, Edwin H. May, Jr., Harry V. Keefe, Jr.
2001	Glenna Collett-Vare, Charles G. Arnold, Everett Fisher, Dick Chapman, James T. Healey, Sr.
2000	James Grant III, John J. Murphy, Walter “Bud” Smith, Johnny Golden
1999	Dr. Philip T. Sehl, Robert D. Pryde, Caroline Keggi
1998	Herbert L. Emanuelson Jr., Anthony Patricelli, Owen Griffith
1997	Lida Kinnicutt, Russell C. Palmer
1996	Alpheus Winter IV
1995	Fred Kask
1994	Terry B. Calabrese
1993	Robert N. Shea
1992	James H. Killington
1991	Martin J. Moraghan
1984–1990	No awards given
1983	Ernest J. Gerardi
1982	Robert L. Kay
1981	Donald Hoenig
1980	Carol Patton
1979	Walter Lowell
1978	Charles Baskin
1977	Charles Petrino
1976	Marcia Dolan
1975	Jerry Courville, Sr.
1974	Dick Siderowf
1973	Harry Nettelbladt
1972	Doug Ford
1971	Edward Burke
1970	William H. Neale
1969	Grace Lenczyk Cronin
1968	Dr. Ted Lenczyk
1967	Pat O'Sullivan
1966	John Reardon, Ph.D.
1965	Felice Torza
1964	Tony Manero
1963	Billy Burke
1962	Gene Sarazen
1961	Julius Boros
1960	Harold H. Mandly, Jr.
1959	Georgianna Bishop
1958	Frank D. Ross
1957	Wilton W. Sherman
1956	Charles C. Clare
1955	Robert M. Grant
