= San Diego Country Club =

Private golf club in Chula Vista, California

Coordinates: 32°37′22″N 117°3′46″W

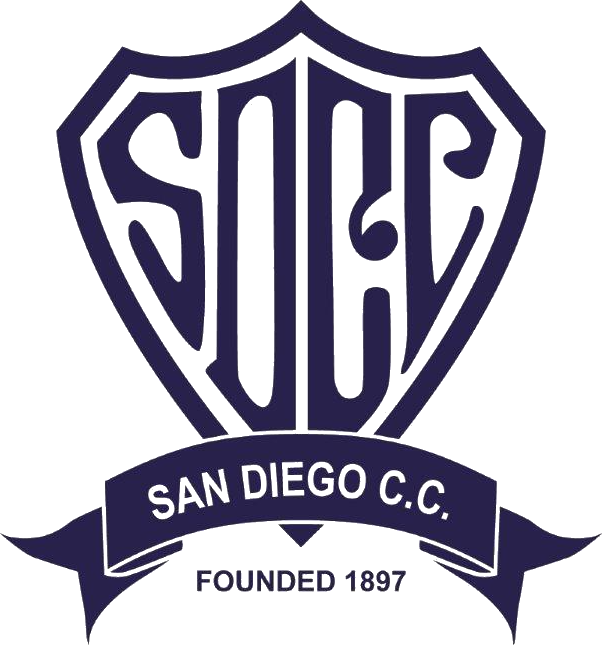
- Interactive map of San Diego Country Club

Club information
- Location: 88 L St, Chula Vista, California, U.S.
- Established: 1897, 129 years ago
- Type: Private
- Tota holes: 18
- Website: sandiegocountryclub.org
- Designed by: William Watson

San Diego Country Club is a private golf club in Chula Vista, California. It was founded in 1897. The club features an 18-hole golf course with a par of 72. The golf course was designed in 1921 by golf course architect Willie Watson and remodeled by William Francis Bell (Billy Bell Jr.) to add additional length and bunkering.

== History ==
In 1897, the club's first facility of 9 holes was built in Balboa Park. It was enlarged in 1898 to accommodate and keep the changing rooms of female and male club members separate. However, in 1914 the club was evicted to make way for construction necessary for the 1915 Pan-American Exposition. Later, the club was merged with Point Loma Golf Club located in Loma Portal, the area close to the present-day San Diego International Airport.

In 1920, more than 150 acres was purchased in Chula Vista. On September 3, 1921, the golf course, designed by William Watson, was officially opened.

The Farmers Insurance Open of the PGA Tour began at the club in 1952 as the San Diego Open.

== Golf tournaments ==
- 1952–1953 San Diego Open (PGA Tour)
- 1964 U.S. Women's Open
- 1993, 2017 U.S. Women's Amateur
- 2002, 2007 Pacific Coast Amateur
- 2013 SCGA Amateur Championship
- Lamkin Intercollegiate 2008–2018
- 2022 Southern California Golf Association Amateur
- 2025 U.S. Senior Women's Open

== See also ==
- San Diego Golf Academy
