= 1962 U.S. Women's Open =

Coordinates: 33.757°N 78.796°W

Tournament information
- Dates: June 28–30, 1962
- Location: Myrtle Beach, South Carolina
- Courses: Dunes Golf and Beach Club
- Organized by: USGA
- Tour: LPGA Tour
- Format: Stroke play – 72 holes

Statistics
- Par: 72
- Length: 6,400 yards (5,850 m)
- Field: 68, 41 after cut
- Cut: 166 (+22)
- Prize fund: $8,000
- Winner's share: $1,800

Champion
- (United States) Murle Lindstrom
- 301 (+13)

Location in the United States
Location in South Carolina

The 1962 U.S. Women's Open was the 17th U.S. Women's Open, held June 28–30 at The Dunes Golf and Beach Club in Myrtle Beach, South Carolina.

Murle Lindstrom, age 23, won the title for her first LPGA Tour victory, two strokes ahead of runners-up Ruth Jessen and Jo Ann Prentice. The first of her four wins on tour, it was the only major title for Lindstrom, later known as Murle Breer.

Defending champion Mickey Wright was a co-leader after 36 holes, but fell back on Saturday morning in the third round and finished five strokes back in a tie for fourth. Wright had won three of the previous four years; she won her fourth U.S. Women's Open two years later in 1964. Jessen led after each of the first three rounds, but a final round 80 (+8) dropped her back.

Thirty professionals and eleven amateurs made the 36-hole cut at 166 (+22) or better; the low amateur was JoAnne Gunderson at 313 (+25), tied for fifteenth place.

== Final leaderboard ==
Saturday, June 30, 1962

Place	Player	Score	To par	Money ($)
1	(United States) Murle Lindstrom	78-74-76-73=301	+13	1,800
T2	(United States) Ruth Jessen	72-76-75-80=303	+15	1,000
T2	(United States) Jo Ann Prentice	75-77-73-78=303	+15	1,000
T4	(United States) Louise Suggs	80-77-74-75=306	+18	575
T4	(United States) Mickey Wright	75-73-81-77=306	+18	575
T6	(United States) Shirley Englehorn	81-72-79-75=307	+19	375
T6	(United States) Mary Lena Faulk	78-74-77-78=307	+19	375
T8	(United States) Marlene Hagge	76-75-81-76=308	+20	313
T8	(United States) Shirley Spork	77-77-79-75=308	+20	313
T10	(United States) Mary Mills	78-79-77-75=309	+21	263
T10	(United States) Kathy Whitworth	80-78-73-78=309	+21	263
