= French Lick Resort =

Resort complex in French Lick, Indiana, US

Coordinates: 38.553°N 86.620°W

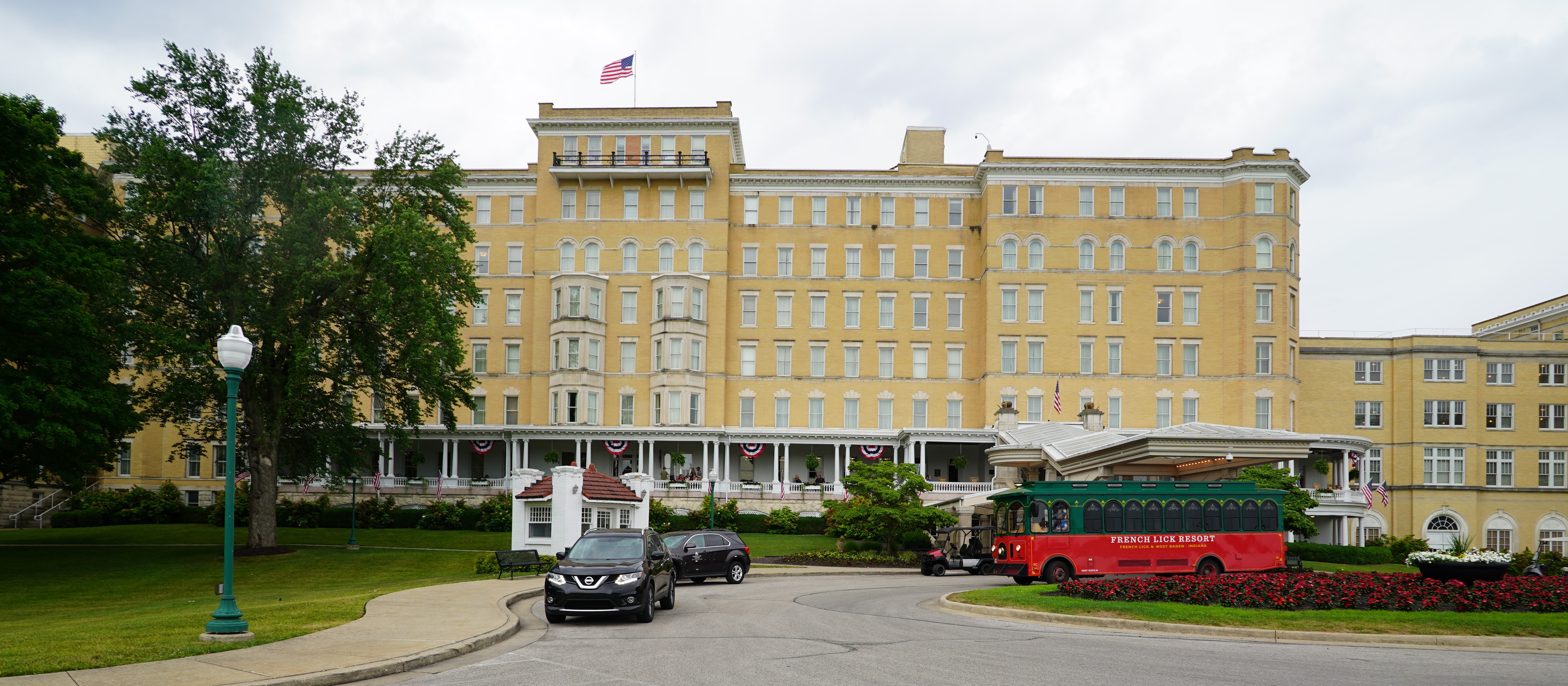
- French Lick Springs Hotel

- Location within Indiana Location within the United States
- Interactive map of French Lick Resort
- Location: 8670 W. State 56 French Lick, Indiana
- Opened: 2006
- Theme: Las Vegas
- No. of rooms: 443 main hotel 243 resort hotel
- Gaming space: 38,000 sq ft (3,500 m^{2})
- Signature attractions: Two golf courses; designed by Donald Ross (1917) & Pete Dye (2009)
- Notable restaurants: 1875: Steakhouse hagans
- Casino type: Land-Based
- Owner: Orange County Holdings
- Website: frenchlick.com

French Lick Resort is a resort complex in the Midwestern United States, located in West Baden Springs and French Lick in Indiana. The 3,000-acre (12 km^{2}) complex includes two historic resort spa hotels, stables, a casino, and three golf courses that are all part of a $500 million restoration and development project.

== Casino ==
The casino opened for business on November 3, 2006, after a gaming license originally intended for Patoka Lake was transferred to French Lick. Honoring state law allowing only water-based gaming, it was originally designed as a riverboat and surrounded by a small pond (commonly nicknamed the Boat in the Moat). In 2008, the moat was filled in and the casino boat was converted into the state's first land-based casino.

The casino features more than 1,300 slot machines, and table games including blackjack, craps, roulette, and poker derivatives.

== French Lick Springs Hotel ==
The site was originally known as the French Lick Springs Hotel, a grand resort that was a mineral spring health spa. The hotel catered to guests seeking the advertised healing properties of the town's sulfur springs, three of which were on the hotel's property. William A. Bowles built and opened the first hotel on his property around 1845. Subsequent owners enlarged the original hotel, but it burned in 1897. Rebuilt and expanded on an even grander scale, especially under the ownership of Thomas Taggart, a former mayor of Indianapolis and chairman of the Democratic National Committee, the popular resort attracted many fashionable, wealthy, and notable guests. In the 1920s and into the 1930s the resort became known for its recreational sports, most notably golf, but the French Lick area also had a reputation for illegal gambling. The hotel was listed on the National Register of Historic Places in 2003. The restored hotel, with its exteriors of distinctive, buff-colored brick, reopened in 2006.

== West Baden Springs Hotel ==
The historic, 243-room luxury West Baden Springs Hotel, in the adjacent town of West Baden Springs, 1 mile (1.6 km) from the French Lick Springs Hotel, is also part of the casino resort complex. The present-day West Baden hotel was built in 1902 (124 years ago) to replace an earlier hotel. The new hotel became known for the 200-foot (61 m) dome covering its atrium. It held the title of the largest free-spanning dome in the world from 1902 to 1913, and remained the largest dome in the United States until the completion of the Coliseum in Charlotte, North Carolina, in 1955. The hotel was listed on the National Register of Historic Places in 1974, and became a National Historic Landmark in 1987. It is also designated as a Historic Civil Engineering Landmark. In 2008 readers of Condé Nast Traveler ranked the West Baden Springs Hotel twenty-first on its list of the top resorts on the United States mainland.

== Golf ==
The casino complex includes three golf courses: the Valley Course, the Hill Course, and the Pete Dye Golf Course at French Lick.

Beginning in the early twentieth century, when golf was gaining popularity, the French Lick hotel began to expand its modest golf facilities. Valley Course, the resort's first golf course, is adjacent to the hotel and casino. It was enlarged to an 18-hole course on 120 acres (49 hectares) around 1907. The larger course design, attributed to Tom Bendelow, featured a combination of wooded hills and flat turf. It has been altered and reduced to a 9-hole course as a result of the casino construction.

Donald Ross and his associates designed the 18-hole Hill Course, the resort's second golf course, around 1917. Completed in 1920 on approximately 300 acres (120 hectares), the championship course was located about 2 miles (3.2 km) from the French Lick hotel. The course hosted the PGA Championship tournament in 1924, which Walter Hagen won. It also hosted the LPGA Championship tournament in 1959 and 1960, and the Midwest Amateur from the 1930s through the 1950s. In 2006–07, the course was restored to its original specifications in cooperation with the Donald Ross Society.

Pete Dye, a renowned golf course designer from Indiana, designed the resort's third course. The 18-hole Pete Dye Golf Course at French Lick opened in June 2009, and hosted the PGA Professional National Championship in June 2010. Mount Airie, Thomas Taggart's 1928 Colonial-style home, was purchased and transformed into a clubhouse and pro shop that overlooks much of the course. This site hosted the Senior PGA Championship in 2015.
