= 1960 U.S. Women's Open =

Coordinates: 42.323°N 71.781°W

Tournament information
- Dates: July 21–23, 1960
- Location: Worcester, Massachusetts
- Course: Worcester Country Club
- Organized by: USGA
- Tour: LPGA Tour
- Format: Stroke play – 72 holes

Statistics
- Par: 72
- Length: 6,137 yards (5,612 m)
- Field: 53, 42 after cut
- Cut: 173 (+29)
- Prize fund: $7,200
- Winner's share: $1,710

Champion
- (United States) Betsy Rawls
- 292 (+4)

Location in the United States
Location in Massachusetts

The 1960 U.S. Women's Open was the 15th U.S. Women's Open, held July 21–23 at Worcester Country Club in Worcester, Massachusetts. It was the eighth conducted by the United States Golf Association (USGA).

Betsy Rawls won her fourth U.S. Women's Open, a stroke ahead of runner-up Joyce Ziske. Two-time defending champion Mickey Wright led by two strokes after 36 holes on Friday, but a difficult Saturday dropped her to fifth. She entered the championship with an ailing knee. It was the seventh of eight major championships for Rawls.

The low amateur was also the youngest competitor: 15-year-old Judy Torluemke (later Rankin) finished at 326 (+38), in 24th place.

The championship was held the same week as the PGA Championship, which concluded on Sunday.

== Final leaderboard ==
Saturday, July 23, 1960

Place	Player	Score	To par	Money ($)
1	(United States) Betsy Rawls	76-73-68-75=292	+4	1,710
2	(United States) Joyce Ziske	75-74-71-73=293	+5	1,140
T3	(United States) Mary Lena Faulk	75-72-76-75=298	+10	689
T3	(United States) Marlene Hagge	74-74-75-75=298	+10	689
5	(United States) Mickey Wright	71-71-75-82=299	+11	475
6	(United States) Wiffi Smith	75-76-73-76=300	+12	380
7	(United States) Beverly Hanson	75-77-77-72=301	+13	323
8	(Uruguay) Fay Crocker	74-76-76-76=302	+14	275
T9	(United States) Marilynn Smith	72-72-83-77=304	+16	215
T9	(United States) Louise Suggs	78-77-72-77=304	+16	215
T9	(United States) Kathy Whitworth	75-73-80-76=304	+16	215
