= Thomasville Open =

Golf tournament formerly on the LPGA Tour

The Thomasville Open was a golf tournament on the LPGA Tour, played only in 1952. It was played in Thomasville, Georgia. Betsy Rawls won the event.
