= Fort Wayne Open (LPGA Tour) =

Golf tournament

The Fort Wayne Open was a golf tournament on the LPGA Tour, played only in 1954. It was played at the Orchard Ridge Country Club in Fort Wayne, Indiana. Marilynn Smith won the event.
