= Mile High Open =

Former golf tournament

The Mile High Open was a golf tournament on the LPGA Tour from 1955 to 1956. It was played at the Lakewood Country Club in Lakewood, Colorado, a Denver suburb.

== Winners ==
Denver Open

- 1956 Marlene Hagge

Mile High Open

- 1955 Marilynn Smith
