= Grace Lenczyk =

American amateur golfer (1927–2013)

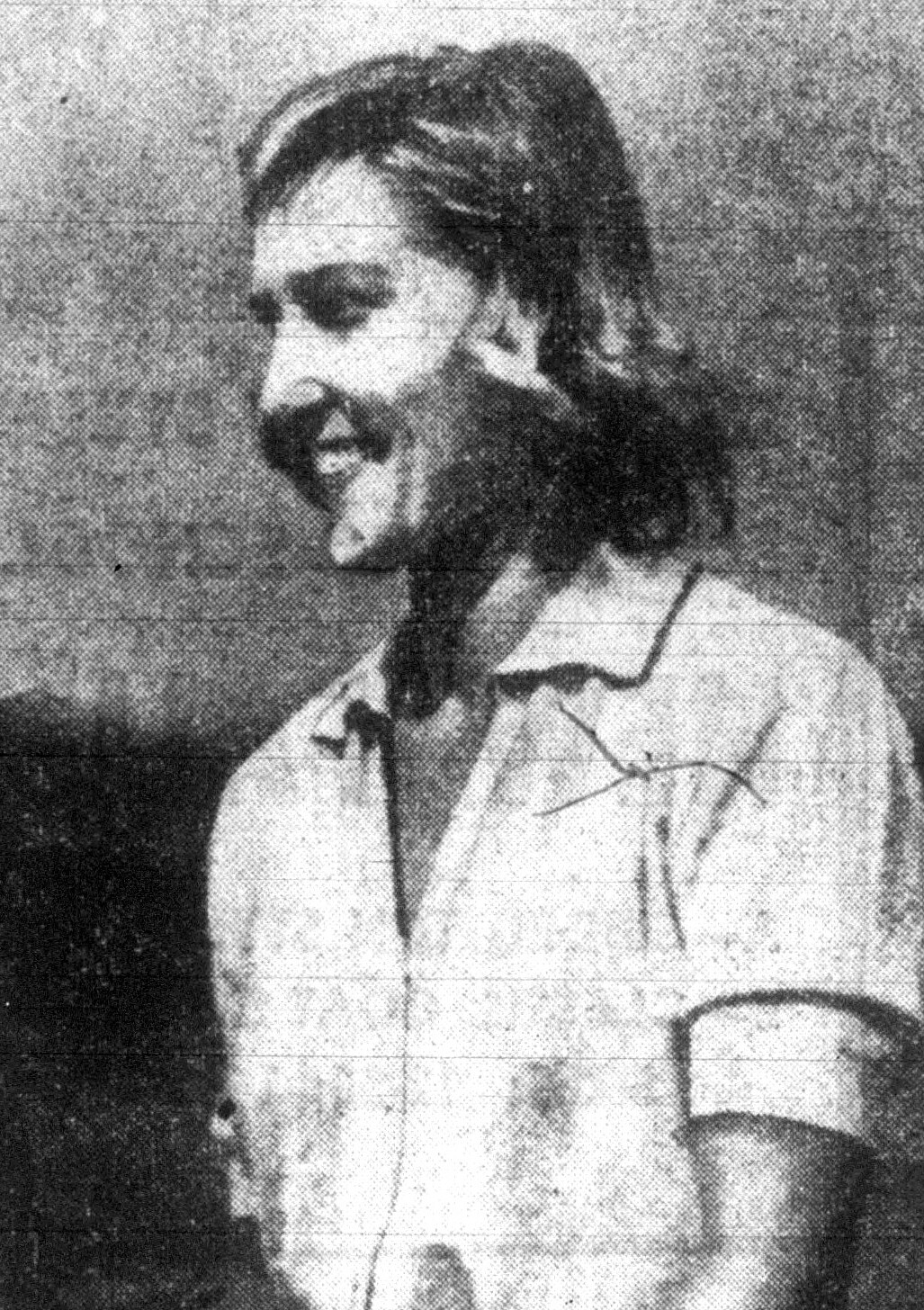
- Lenczyk, circa 1953

Personal information
- Full name: Grace Lenczyk Cronin
- Nationality: United States
- Born: September 12, 1927 Newington, Connecticut, U.S.
- Died: December 13, 2013 (aged 86) Walpole, Massachusetts, U.S.
- Spouse: Robert Cronin

Career
- Sport: Golf
- Status: Amateur
- Professional wins: 1

Best results in LPGA major championships
- Western Open: T3: 1947
- Titleholders C'ship: 8th: 1948
- U.S. Women's Open: T4: 1948

Achievements and awards
- Connecticut Golf Hall of Fame: 1969

Grace Lenczyk Cronin (September 12, 1927 – December 13, 2013) was an American amateur golfer. She won the Canadian Women's Amateur twice and the U.S. Women's Amateur once during the late 1940s. At major championships, she had top eight finishes at the Women's Western Open and Titleholders Championship. In team events, she was a member of the winning American team at the 1948 and 1950 Curtis Cup. Lenczyk was inducted into the Connecticut Golf Hall of Fame in 1969.

== Early life and education ==
Lenczyk was born on September 12, 1927, in Newington, Connecticut. At the age of eleven, she started playing golf with her siblings at the Indian Hill Country Club in Newington, Connecticut. For her post-secondary education, Lenczyk went to Arnold College to study physical education.

== Golf career ==
As an amateur golfer, Lenczyk competed at the U.S. Women's Amateur consecutively between 1946 and 1949 and was the 1948 championship champion when the event was held at Pebble Beach. She has been honored by having the 5th hole of the course, The Hay, named "Grace" in recognition of her U.S. Women's Amateur by the Pebble Beach Company.

Outside of the United States, Lenczyk won the 1947 and 1948 Canadian Women's Amateur and appeared at the 1948 and 1949 British Ladies Amateur. Apart from her amateur competitions, Lenczyk had her first professional win at the 1947 All American Open. During this time period, the Women's Western Open and Titleholders Championship were held as major championships. At these events, she reached the semifinals of the 1947 Women's Western Open and had a top eight finish at the 1948 Titleholders Championship. In team events, she was a member of the American team that won the 1948 and 1950 Curtis Cup.

== Death ==
On December 13, 2013, Lenczyk died in Walpole, Massachusetts.

== Awards and honors ==
- In 1969, Lenczyk was inducted into the Connecticut Golf Hall of Fame.
- In 1980, Lenczyk was inducted into the Stetson University Hall of Fame.
