= Reno Open (LPGA Tour) =

Golf tournament formerly on the LPGA Tour

The Reno Open was a golf tournament on the LPGA Tour in 1953 and 1957. It was played in Reno, Nevada.

== Winners ==
- 1957 Betsy Rawls
- 1954–56 No tournament
- 1953 Patty Berg
