= Women's Golf Charities Open =

Golf tournament formerly on the LPGA Tour

The Women's Golf Charities Open was a golf tournament on the LPGA Tour, played only in 1970. It was played at the Inwood Forest Country Club in Houston, Texas. Marilynn Smith won the event in a sudden-death playoff with Sandra Haynie and Judy Rankin.
