= Georgianna Bishop =

American golfer (1878–1971)

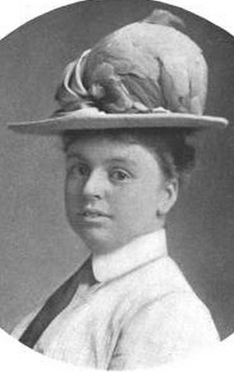
Georgianna Bishop, from a 1903 publication.

Georgianna Millington Bishop (October 15, 1878 – September 1, 1971) was an American amateur golfer.

== Career ==
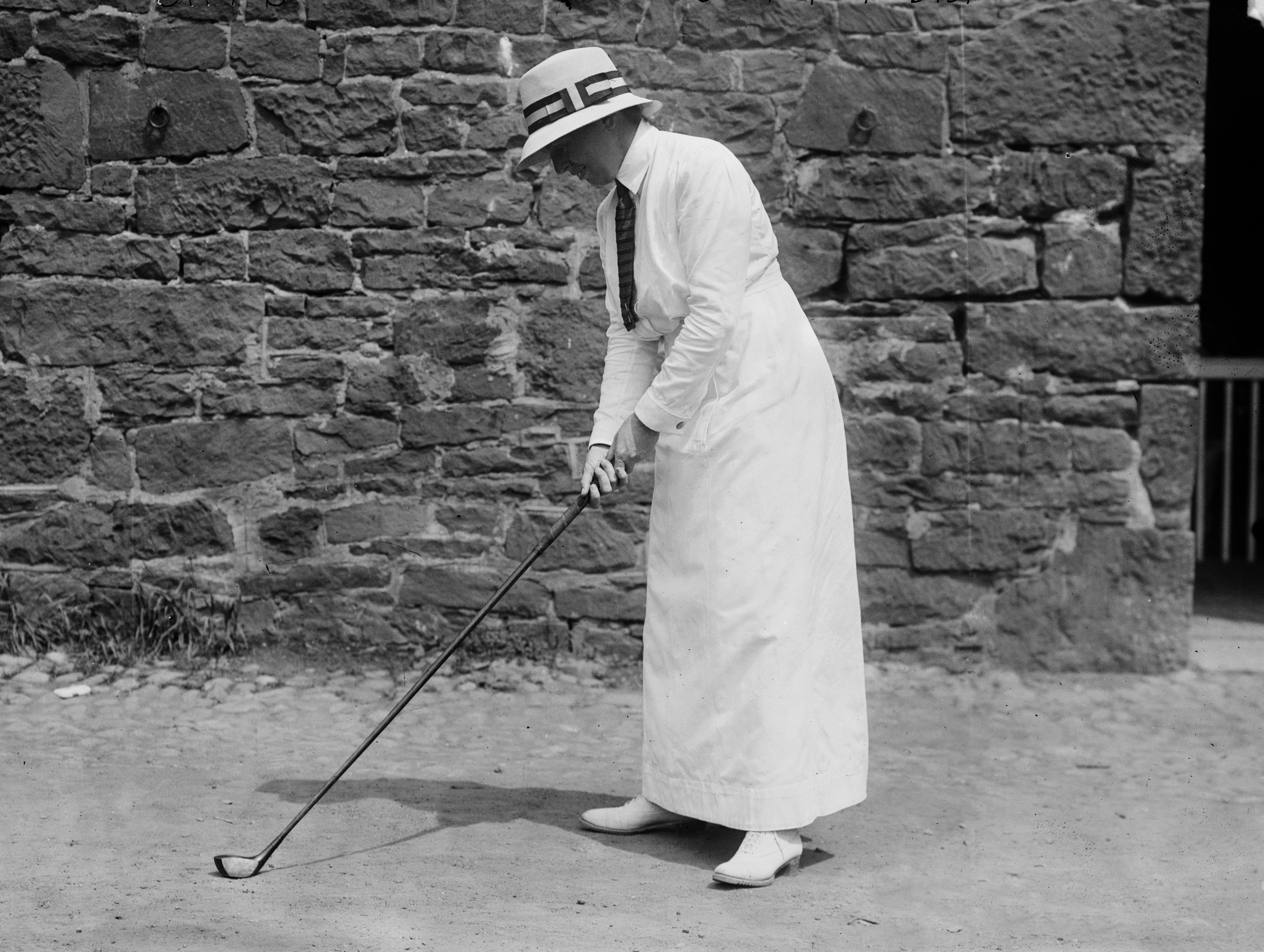
Georgianna Bishop in 1914

She was born on October 15, 1878, in Bridgeport, Connecticut, to Sydney Bishop and Mary Helen Staples.

She was the winner of the 1904 U.S. Women's Amateur, played at Merion Golf Club in Ardmore, Pennsylvania , beating her sister in the first round and ultimately defeating Mrs. E. F. Sanford from the Essex County Country Club. She played in the U.S. Women's Amateur 18 times from 1899 to 1923. She played for the Brooklawn Golf Club in Bridgeport, Connecticut. Bishop won the Connecticut state amateur championships for women four times: 1920–1922 and 1927. Bishop also won the Metropolitan (NY) championship in 1907 and 1908 and placed runner-up five times. In 1921, she played in her first and only Berthellyn Cup at the Huntingdon Valley Country Club in Philadelphia.

== Personal life ==
Bishop died on September 1, 1971, in Bridgeport, Connecticut.

== Awards and honors ==
In 1959, Bishop became the fifth inductee into the Connecticut Golf Hall of Fame.
