= 1964 U.S. Women's Open =

Coordinates: 32.622°N 117.063°W

Tournament information
- Dates: July 9–12, 1964
- Location: Chula Vista, California
- Course: San Diego Country Club
- Organized by: USGA
- Tour: LPGA Tour
- Format: Stroke play – 72 holes

Statistics
- Par: 73
- Length: 6,376 yards (5,830 m)
- Field: 58: 29 pros, 29 amateurs
- Prize fund: $10,010
- Winner's share: $2,200

Champion
- (United States) Mickey Wright
- 290 (−2), playoff

Location in the United States
Location in California

The 1964 U.S. Women's Open was the 19th U.S. Women's Open, held July 9–12 at San Diego Country Club in Chula Vista, California.

Hometown favorite Mickey Wright won her fourth and final U.S. Women's Open in an 18-hole playoff, two strokes ahead of runner-up Ruth Jessen, 70 to 72. At the 72nd hole on Saturday afternoon, Jessen birdied while Wright scrambled for par from a greenside bunker to force the Sunday playoff. Both players had San Diego ties, as Wright was born and raised in the area and Jessen was a resident of Bonsall.

Jessen, originally of Seattle, was also a runner-up two years earlier in 1962. Wright, a Dallas resident, led (or co-led) after each of the five rounds to win the twelfth of her thirteen major titles. Defending champion Mary Mills finished in eleventh place.

The championship was held the same week as the Open Championship in Scotland, which concluded on Friday.

This was the last U.S. Women's Open to schedule the final two rounds for Saturday, the format since the USGA took over in 1953. In 1965, the final round was moved to Sunday, as it was from 1947 through 1952.

== Final leaderboard ==
Saturday, July 11, 1964

Place	Player	Score	To par	Money ($)
T1	(United States) Mickey Wright	71-71-75-73=290	−2	Playoff
T1	(United States) Ruth Jessen	72-73-74-71=290	−2	Playoff
T3	(United States) Marilynn Smith	75-70-72-74=291	−1	797
T3	(United States) Shirley Englehorn	71-78-68-74=291	−1	797
5	(United States) Sandra Haynie	78-73-70-74=295	+3	550
6	(United States) Peggy Wilson	73-77-72-74=296	+4	440
T7	(United States) Jo Ann Prentice	78-73-76-71=298	+6	371
T7	(United States) Marlene Hagge	71-76-74-77=298	+6	371
9	(United States) Kathy Whitworth	76-76-75-73=300	+8	330
10	(United States) Patty Berg	76-74-77-75=302	+10	302

=== Playoff ===
Sunday, July 12, 1964

Place	Player	Score	To par	Money ($)
1	(United States) Mickey Wright	35-35=70	−3	2,200
2	(United States) Ruth Jessen	36-36=72	−1	1,320

- Par: 36-37=73
