= 1959 LPGA Championship =

Coordinates: 38.528°N 86.648°W

Tournament information
- Dates: July 2–6, 1959
- Location: French Lick, Indiana
- Course: Sheraton Hotel Country Club
- Tour: LPGA Tour
- Format: Stroke play – 72 holes

Statistics
- Par: 74
- Length: 6,700 yards (6,130 m)
- Field: 29 players
- Cut: none
- Prize fund: $7,500
- Winner's share: $1,247

Champion
- (United States) Betsy Rawls
- 288 (−8)

Location in the United States
Location in Indiana

The 1959 LPGA Championship was the fifth LPGA Championship, held July 2–6 at Sheraton Hotel Country Club in French Lick, Indiana.

Betsy Rawls won the first of her two LPGA Championships, one stroke ahead of Patty Berg. The final round on Sunday was delayed to Monday due to heavy rain and unplayable greens. Defending champion Mickey Wright finished nine strokes back in eighth place. It was the fourth of eight major titles for Rawls.

The course was designed by Donald Ross; it opened in 1917 and was originally known as the "Hill Course." It hosted the PGA Championship in 1924, the second of five won by Walter Hagen and the first of four consecutive. It is now named the "Donald Ross Course." The LPGA Championship returned to the course the following year in 1960.

== Final leaderboard ==
Monday, July 6, 1959

Place	Player	Score	To par	Money ($)
1	(United States) Betsy Rawls	76-68-69-75=288	−8	1,247
2	(United States) Patty Berg	75-71-73-70=289	−7	961
3	(United States) Louise Suggs	75-70-74-71=290	−6	760
4	(United States) Joyce Ziske	73-72-72-76=293	−3	603
5	(United States) Marlene Hagge	76-74-71-73=294	−2	516
T6	(United States) Gloria Armstrong	78-74-74-70=296	E	409
T6	(United States) Bonnie Randolph	74-73-75-74=296	E	409
8	(United States) Mickey Wright	73-74-73-77=297	+1	318
9	(Uruguay) Fay Crocker	81-74-73-71=299	+3	285
T10	(United States) Beverly Hanson	73-74-79-75=301	+5	240
T10	(United States) Peggy Kirk Bell	74-80-75-72=301	+5	240
