= 1951 U.S. Women's Open =

Coordinates: 33.775°N 84.331°W

Tournament information
- Dates: September 13–16, 1951
- Location: Atlanta, Georgia
- Course: Druid Hills Golf Club
- Organized by: LPGA Tour and Northside Kiwanis Club
- Tour: LPGA Tour
- Format: Stroke play – 72 holes

Statistics
- Par: 72
- Length: 6,200 yards (5,670 m)
- Prize fund: $7,500
- Winner's share: $1,500

Champion
- (United States) Betsy Rawls
- 293 (+5)

Location in the United States

The 1951 U.S. Women's Open was the sixth U.S. Women's Open, held September 13–16 at Druid Hills Golf Club in Atlanta, Georgia.

First-year professional Betsy Rawls, age 23, won the first of her eight major championships, five strokes ahead of runner-up Louise Suggs, the 1949 champion. It was the first of four U.S. Women's Open titles for Rawls, with additional wins in 1953, 1957, and 1960.

Prior to this event, the LPGA Tour petitioned the United States Golf Association (USGA) to take over the championship, which it did two years later in 1953.

== Final leaderboard ==
Sunday, September 16, 1951

Place	Player	Score	To par	Money ($)
1	(United States) Betsy Rawls	73-71-74-75=293	+5	1,500
2	(United States) Louise Suggs	73-79-75-71=298	+10	1,000
3	(United States) Babe Zaharias	70-78-73-78=299	+11	900
T4	(United States) Marlene Bauer	71-78-72-79=300	+12	700
T4	(United States) Pat Lesser (a)	75-74-74-77=300	+12	0
6	(United States) Beverly Hanson	78-75-70-79=302	+14	575
7	(United States) Dot Kirby (a)	75-76-75-77=303	+15	0
8	(United States) Patty Berg	74-75-77-79=305	+17	450
T9	(United States) Mary Lena Faulk (a)	74-76-78-78=306	+18	0
T9	(United States) Kathy McKinnon (a)	73-80-73-80=306	+18	0
