= Asheville Open =

Golf tournament formerly on the LPGA Tour

The Asheville Open was a golf tournament on the LPGA Tour from 1957 to 1960. It was played at the Asheville Country Club in Asheville, North Carolina. In 1958 and 1959, some rounds were also played at the Beaver Lake Golf Club and the Biltmore Forest Country Club.

== Winners ==
Asheville Open

- 1960 Betsy Rawls

Land of the Sky Open

- 1959 Betsy Rawls

Land of Sky Open

- 1958 Marlene Hagge
- 1957 Beverly Hanson
