= Memphis Open (LPGA Tour) =

Golf tournament formerly on the LPGA Tour

The Memphis Open was a golf tournament on the LPGA Tour from 1959 to 1960. It was played at the Ridgeway Country Club in Memphis, Tennessee.

== Winners ==
- 1960 Mickey Wright
- 1959 Marilynn Smith
