= Mt. Prospect Open =

Golf tournament

The Mt. Prospect Open was a golf tournament on the LPGA Tour, played only in 1959. It was played at the Mount Prospect Country Club in Mount Prospect, Illinois. Betsy Rawls won the event.
