= Shirley Spork =

American professional golfer (1927–2022)

Personal information
- Nationality: United States
- Born: May 14, 1927 Detroit, Michigan, U.S.
- Died: April 12, 2022 (aged 94) Palm Springs, California, U.S.

Career
- Sport: Golf
- College: Michigan State Normal College (now Eastern Michigan University)
- Turned professional: 1950
- Former tour: LPGA Tour (co-founder)

Best results in LPGA major championships
- Women's PGA C'ship: 2nd: 1962
- U.S. Women's Open: T8: 1962

Achievements and awards
- Patty Berg Award: 2015

Shirley G. Spork (May 14, 1927 – April 12, 2022) was an American professional golfer and one of the founders of the LPGA Tour. Spork finished second at the 1962 LPGA Championship. She worked as a teaching professional for many years and was recognized as LPGA Teacher of the Year in 1959 and 1984. Spork also taught golf with the National Golf Foundation and was an educator at Bowling Green State University. As a player, she started in her early teens and continued to play golf into her nineties.

== Early life ==
In 1927, Spork was born in Detroit, Michigan. Spork was raised in Redford, Michigan, the only child of a father who was an electrical engineer and a mother who was a clerk in a pharmacy, both did not play golf, but the family home was adjacent to the Bonnie Brook Golf Course.

As a child, she began to collect, wash and resell golf balls and at age 13, used these funds to buy her own golf clubs. She began to practice after hours. She played in tournaments in Detroit as young as age 14 and the Detroit Free Press wrote in 1941 that she "appears to be one of the future stars of Detroit." She went on to attend a golf school given by the Free Press. One of her first major wins took place in 1944 at a Red Cross golf event.

== Amateur career ==
Spork wanted to play golf after high school, but was discouraged by her parents. Instead, she started to attend Michigan State Normal College (now Eastern Michigan University) in 1945. She had "top honors" at the Women's District Golf Association tournament in June 1946. At college, she won the 1947 national individual intercollegiate golf championship, playing in between final exams. She was runner-up in the intercollegiate championship in 1948. She graduated from college in 1949.

Spork was able to give back to EMU Athletics by supporting the women's golf team despite graduating 23 years before Title IX made gender equality in sports a reality in 1972. An endowment has been established in her honor to complement the program's operating budget and extend women's golf possibilities. In addition, every October at EagleCrest Golf Club, EMU hosts a fall women's collegiate tournament in her honor.

== Professional career ==
Spork went pro and began to play professional events in 1950. In the fall of 1950, Spork was hired to work at the health and physical education department of Bowling Green State University. She also served as the LPGA’s T&CP chairperson for eight years. Spork was one of the thirteen founders of the LPGA in 1950. Shirley Spork finished among the top 10 on the LPGA’s money list in 1950.

In 1951, she toured the United Kingdom and France. She also started teaching golf at Tamarisk Country Club in Palm Springs, California in 1954. She was also involved with creating a teaching division in the LPGA which became the Teaching and Club Professional Membership. She finished second at the 1962 LPGA Championship and fourth in the Carling Eastern Open that year.

For a few years in the mid to late 1970s, Spork worked as an educator for the National Golf Foundation. Additionally, she founded the Shirley Spork L.P.G.A. Masters Pro-Am at the Palm Valley Country Club in Palm Desert, Calif., in 2016, with part of the proceeds benefiting the Eastern Michigan University women’s golf program. Spork continued to play golf into her 90s.

== Personal life ==
Despite her booming fame, Spork lived a relatively private life. She never married and did not mother any children. However, she did have a life-long companion of 56 years named Jane Woolley who was the daughter of E.R. Woolley the founder and owner of Golfcraft, Inc., now Titleist Golf International.

Spork died on April 12, 2022, at the age of 94. She will be interred at Desert Memorial Park.

== Awards and honors ==
- She was awarded the LPGA Teacher of the Year Award in 1959 and again in 1984.
- In 1968, she joined the Michigan Golf Hall of Fame.
- In addition, she was added to the Eastern Michigan University Athletic Hall of Fame in 1981.
- Spork received the Ellen Griffin Rolex Award, the L.P.G.A.’s highest teaching honor, in 1998.
- She was inducted into the inaugural class of the L.P.G.A. Teaching and Club Professional Hall of Fame in 2000.
- She won the 2015 Patty Berg Award for contributions to women’s golf.
- She also received the Heritage Award from the SCPGA in 2017.
- Spork was inducted into the PGA of America Hall of Fame in 2019.
- Two weeks before Spork died, it was announced that she, along with the other 12 founders of the tour, would be inducted into the LPGA Tour Hall of Fame.

== In popular culture ==
Spork is featured in a documentary about the LPGA, The Founders (2016). It chronicles the stories of the founding 13 members of the Ladies Professional Golf Association as they fought overcome incredible odds to form the longest-running women's sports organization in the world in the late 1940s.

She wrote about her career in her 2017 autobiography, From Green to Tee. Until this book, only a few have heard Spork's colorful stories of the LPGA's early days, her travels to Europe as a young woman, the ladies of the Tour, and the celebrities she taught on the golf course (Bob Hope, Harpo Marks and others). As a bonus, Spork shares "Sporkisms" - her signature golf instruction - that have inspired so many to be better golf teachers and players. Also included are personal letters to Spork from some of golf's greatest players, teachers and LPGA officials. It highlights the trials and tribulations of how women's professional golf started, where it went and what she did over 67 years to enhance and further the game.

== Selected bibliography ==
- Spork, Shirley (2017). From Green to Tee. CreateSpace. ISBN 9781541170988.
- Spork, Shirley (1972). Golf Instructor's Guide. with Lorraine Abbott and Ellen Griffen. National Golf Foundation. OCLC 11226610.

== Sources ==
- Vold, Mona (1999). Different Strokes: The Lives and Teachings of the Game's Wisest Women. New York: Simon & Schuster. p. 4. ISBN 0684848635.
