= 1951 Grand National =

English steeplechase horse race

- Grand National
- Location: Aintree Racecourse
- Date: 7 April 1951
- Winning horse: Nickel Coin
- Starting price: 40/1
- Jockey: John Bullock
- Trainer: (Republic of Ireland) Jack O'Donoghue
- Owner: Jeffrey Royle
- Conditions: Soft

External videos
- Highlights of the 1951 Grand National (British Pathé)

The 1951 Grand National was the 105th renewal of the Grand National horse race that took place at Aintree Racecourse near Liverpool, England, on 7 April 1951.

A crowd of 250,000 people saw the race won by Nickel Coin at odds of 40/1. The nine-year-old mare was ridden by jockey John Bullock and trained by Jack O'Donoghue. Royal Tan, who won in 1954, finished second, and Derrinstown was third. An unprecedented twelve horses (a third of the field) went at the first fence- either falling or being brought down. Of the 36 runners, only three completed the course. All of the horses returned safely to the stables.

In the long history of the Grand National only 13 mares have won the race, Nickel Coin being the most recent.

== Finishing order ==
Position	Name	Jockey	Age	Handicap (st-lb)	SP	Distance
01	Nickel Coin	Johnny Bullock	9	10–1	40/1	6 Lengths
02	Royal Tan	Phonsie O'Brien	7	10–13	40/1	
03	Derrinstown	Albert Power	11	10–0	66/1	Last to complete

== Non-finishers ==
Fence	Name	Jockey	Age	Handicap (st-lb)	SP	Fate
01	Cadamstown	Jack Dowdeswell	11	10–4	50-1	Fell
01	Column	Atty Corbett	11	10–1	100/1	Fell
01	Confucius	Mick O'Dwyer	10	10–0	100/1	Fell
01	East A'Calling	Michael Scudamore	10	10–2	50/1	Brought Down
01	Finnure	Dick Francis	10	12–0	22/1	Fell
01	Irish Lizard	Pat Taaffe	8	10–1	50/1	Brought Down
01	Land Fort	Bryan Marshall	7	11–3	20/1	Fell
01	Parsonhill	Jim Seely	12	10–2	100/1	Fell
01	Revealed	Mr W Beynon-Brown	11	10–0	100/1	Fell
01	Stalbridge Rock	Dick McCreery	8	10–5	66/1	Fell
01	Stockman	George Vergette	9	10–2	100/1	Brought Down
01	Texas Dan	Paddy Fitzgerald	9	10–1	66/1	Brought Down
02	Gallery	Alf Mullins	13	10–4	50/1	Fell
02	Freebooter	Jimmy Power	10	12–7	10/1	Brought Down
05	Shagreen	Glen Kelly	10	12–2	10/1	Fell
06	Morning Cover	George Slack	10	10–0	40/1	Fell
07	Binghamstown	Louis Furman	12	10–0	100/1	Fell
07	Rowland Roy	David Dick	12	10–12	50/1	Fell
07	Sergeant Kelly	Reg De'Ath	10	10–12	40/1	Brought Down
08	Arctic Gold	Tim Molony	6	10–13	8/1	Fell
08	Armoured Knight	Tommy Cusack	7	10–8	66/1	Brought Down
08	Cloncarrig	Bob Turnell	11	12–0	10/1	Fell
08	Glen Fire	Fred Winter	8	10–1	33/1	Fell
08	Prince Brownie	Tony Grantham	9	10–9	33/1	Fell
08	Tasman	Charles Hook	11	10–0	100/1	Refused
09	Roimond	Andrew Jarvis	10	12–0	100/7	Fell
09	Partpoint	Arthur Thompson	9	10–5	33/1	Fell
09	Queen of the Dandies	Roy Carter	10	10–0	100/1	Fell
10	Caesar's Wife	Gordon Rogers	9	10–8	100/1	Fell
15	Russian Hero	Leo McMorrow	11	11–1	40/1	Fell
15	Dog Watch	Tim Brookshaw	10	10–2	33/1	Fell
23	Broomfield	Rene Emery	10	10–4	33/1	Fell
23	Gay Heather	Dick Curran	10	10–0	66/1	Fell

== Media Coverage ==
With rationing still in place across the UK, newspapers had limited space for coverage of the race, most only running a brief preview with the race card. The Radio Times carried a picture of 1950 winner, Freebooter jumping the final flight on the way to victory with a map of the course on its cover.

The BBC had requested to screen the race live on Television but Aintree refused, leaving the BBC light radio programme to issue a thirty-minute broadcast at 3pm. David Black called the runners over the early fences, Michael O'Hehir took over at Becher's and Canal turn with Richard North calling them up the Canal Side before handing over to lead commentator, Raymond Glendenning to call the runners home. Each commentator was assisted by a race caller who would spot and identify horses departing the contest. Peter O'Sullevan, who would eventually be known as the voice of Racing, this year acted as O'Hehir's caller.

The major newsreel companies regarded the National as one of the major highlights of their year. Movietone, presented by Lionel Gamlin, Pathe and Gaumont, all had cameras on the course and had their coverage ready to be screened in cinemas within hours.
