= Opie Turner Open =

Golf tournament formerly on the LPGA Tour

The Opie Turner Open was a golf tournament on the LPGA Tour from 1958 to 1959. It was played at Turner's Lodge in Burneyville, Oklahoma.

== Winners ==
- 1959 Betsy Rawls
- 1958 Mickey Wright
