= 1959 Women's Western Open =

Golf tournament

Tournament information
- Dates: August 13–16, 1959
- Location: Seattle, Washington; 47.5052°N 122.3077°W
- Courses: Ranier Golf & Country Club
- Tour: LPGA Tour
- Format: 72 holes, stroke play

Statistics
- Par: 72
- Length: 6,238 yards (5,704 m)
- Field: 161 players, 32 after cut
- Cut: 163 (+19)
- Prize fund: $8,000
- Winner's share: $1,313

Champion
- Betsy Rawls
- 293 (−1)
- Location within the United States Location within Washington (state)

The 1959 Women's Western Open was contested from August 13–16 at Ranier Golf & Country Club in Seattle, Washington. It was the 30th edition of the Women's Western Open.

This event was won by Betsy Rawls.

== Final leaderboard ==
Place	Player	Score	To par	Money ($)
1	(United States) Betsy Rawls	70-76-76-71=293	−1	1,400
T2	(United States) Patty Berg	76-74-76-73=299	+5	1,012
T2	(United States) JoAnne Gunderson (a)	77-75-74-73=299	+5	0
T4	(United States) Beverly Hanson	75-75-76-74=300	+6	719
T4	(United States) Betty Jameson	71-75-77-77=300	+6	719
6	(United States) Kathy Cornelius	76-74-76-76=302	+8	540
7	(United States) Louise Suggs	72-79-75-77=303	+9	468
T8	(United States) Murle MacKenzie	74-78-79-74=305	+11	375
T8	(United States) Joyce Ziske	76-73-75-82=305	+11	375
10	(United States) Jo Ann Prentice	77-78-76-76=307	+13	300
