= 1951 Titleholders Championship =

Golf tournament in Augusta, Georgia, US

The 1951 Titleholders Championship was contested from March 15–18 at Augusta Country Club. It was the 12th edition of the Titleholders Championship.

This event was won by amateur Pat O'Sullivan.

== Final leaderboard ==
| Place | Player | Score | To par | Money ($) |
|---|---|---|---|---|
| 1 | (United States) Pat O'Sullivan (a) | 73-76-77-76=301 | +13 | 0 |
| 2 | (United States) Beverly Hanson (a) | 80-75-76-72=303 | +15 | 0 |
| T3 | (United States) Patty Berg | 74-79-76-76=305 | +17 | 750 |
| T3 | (United States) Claire Doran (a) | 76-75-76-78=305 | +17 | 0 |
| T5 | (United States) Marlene Bauer | 80-88-81-71=312 | +24 | 325 |
| T5 | (United States) Babe Zaharias | 79-80-77-76=312 | +24 | 325 |
| 7 | (United States) Mary Lena Faulk (a) | 84-86-75-74=319 | +31 | 0 |
| 8 | (United States) Mrs Julius Page Jr. (a) | 78-80-84-78=320 | +32 | 0 |
| 9 | (United States) Majorie Lindsay (a) | 78-83-80-80=321 | +33 | 0 |
| 10 | (United States) Helen Dettweiler | 84-87-77-74=322 | +34 | 100 |
