= Tampa Women's Open =

Golf tournament formerly on the LPGA Tour

The Tampa Women's Open was a golf tournament on the LPGA Tour from 1947 to 1960. It was played at the Palma Ceia Golf & Country Club in Tampa, Florida. The 1950 event was the first official event on the LPGA Tour. The events played before the LPGA was founded in 1950 are recognized as official wins.

== Winners ==
- 1960 Mickey Wright
- 1959 Ruth Jessen
- 1958 Betsy Rawls
- 1957 Betsy Rawls
- 1956 Betsy Rawls
- 1955 Babe Zaharias
- 1954 Betsy Rawls
- 1953 Louise Suggs
- 1952 Louise Suggs
- 1951 Babe Zaharias
- 1950 Polly Riley (amateur)
- 1949 Patty Berg
- 1948 Betty Jameson
- 1947 Babe Zaharias (amateur)
