= Pat O'Sullivan =

American amateur golfer (1926–2019)

Personal information
- Full name: Patricia B. O'Sullivan Lucey
- Nationality: United States
- Born: September 1, 1926 New Haven, Connecticut, U.S.
- Died: November 6, 2019 (aged 93) Orange, Connecticut, U.S.
- Spouse: C. Gerald Lucey

Career
- Sport: Golf
- Status: Amateur

Best results in LPGA major championships (wins: 1)
- Western Open: 2nd: 1951
- Titleholders C'ship: Won: 1951
- Women's PGA C'ship: 7th: 1955
- U.S. Women's Open: T14: 1948

Patricia B. O'Sullivan Lucey (September 1, 1926 – November 6, 2019) was an American amateur golfer.

== Early life ==
In 1926, O'Sullivan was born in New Haven, Connecticut. She was the daughter of Marguerite Lawton and Patrick Brett O'Sullivan, a U.S. representative from Connecticut (1923–1925) and member of the Connecticut Supreme Court (1950–1957). O'Sullivan attended Katherine Gibbs College and Bradford College.

== Golf career ==
O'Sullivan won the 1950, 1951, and 1953 North and South Women's Amateur. She also won the 1951 Titleholders Championship, then one of the LPGA Tour's major championships. She represented the United States in the Curtis Cup in 1952 and won several tournaments in her native New England.

O'Sullivan was a member of Race Brook Country Club in Orange, Connecticut from 1942. The club named its inside nine golf course "The O'Sullivan" in her honor.

== Personal life ==
O'Sullivan was married to C. Gerald Lucey, member of the Massachusetts House of Representatives (1947–1953) and mayor of Brockton, Massachusetts (1952–1956).

== Awards and honors ==
In 1967, O'Sullivan was inducted into the Connecticut Golf Hall of Fame.

== Amateur wins ==
- 1950 North and South Women's Amateur Golf Championship
- 1951 North and South Women's Amateur Golf Championship
- 1953 North and South Women's Amateur Golf Championship

== Professional wins ==
- 1951 Titleholders Championship (as an amateur)

== Major championships ==
=== Wins (1) ===
Year	Championship	Winning score	Margin	Runner-up
1951	Titleholders Championship	+13 (72-76-77-76=301)	2 strokes	(United States) Beverly Hanson

== Team appearances ==
Amateur

- Curtis Cup (representing the United States): 1952
