= Marilynn Smith =

American professional golfer (1929–2019)

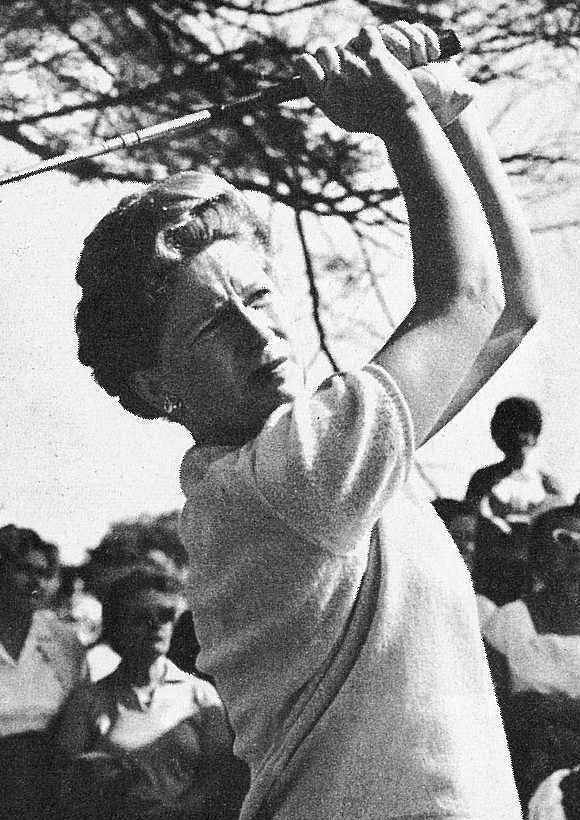
- Smith follows the flight of her ball

Personal information
- Full name: Marilynn Louise Smith
- Nickname: Miss Personality
- Nationality: United States
- Born: April 13, 1929 Topeka, Kansas, U.S.
- Died: April 9, 2019 (aged 89) Goodyear, Arizona, U.S.

Career
- Sport: Golf
- College: University of Kansas
- Turned professional: 1950
- Former tour: LPGA Tour (Founder)
- Professional wins: 23

Number of wins by tour
- LPGA Tour: 21
- Other: 2

Best results in LPGA major championships (wins: 2)
- Western Open: 3rd: 1963
- Titleholders C'ship: Won: 1963, 1964
- Chevron Championship: CUT: 1984, 1987
- Women's PGA C'ship: 5th/T5: 1961, 1966, 1972
- U.S. Women's Open: 3rd/T3: 1964, 1965, 1968
- du Maurier Classic: DNP

Achievements and awards
- World Golf Hall of Fame: 2006 (member page)
- LPGA Most Improved Player: 1963
- LPGA Patty Berg Award: 1979
- Commissioner's Award (LPGA Founders): 2000

Marilynn Louise Smith (April 13, 1929 – April 9, 2019) was an American professional golfer. She was one of the thirteen founders of the LPGA in 1950. She won two major championships and 21 LPGA Tour events in all. She is a member of the World Golf Hall of Fame.

== Early life and amateur career ==
In 1929, Smith was born in Topeka, Kansas. She started playing golf at age 12.

She was a three-time winner of the Kansas State Amateur from 1946 to 1948. She won the 1949 national individual intercollegiate golf championship while attending the University of Kansas.

== Professional career ==
In 1949, Smith turned pro. She joined the Spalding staff. She was one of the thirteen women who founded the LPGA in 1950. She won her first tournament in 1952 at the Fort Wayne Open. She would go on to win a total of 21 events on the LPGA Tour, including two major championships, the 1963 and 1964 Titleholders Championships. She finished in the top ten on the money list nine times between 1961 and 1972, with her best finishes being fourth places in 1963, 1968 and 1970. She was named the LPGA Most Improved Player in 1963. She also was the LPGA's president from 1958 to 1960.

In 1973 she became the first woman to work on a men's golf television broadcast.

== Personal life ==
While playing at a tournament in Florida, Smith escaped uninjured when a sniper fired several shots at her and Australian player Margie Masters. The perpetrator was never identified.

She died on April 9, 2019, four days before her 90th birthday, from complications of an infection due to a fall during the week of The Founders Cup in Phoenix.

== Awards and honors ==
- In 1963, Smith was honored with the LPGA's Most Improved Player award.
- In 1979, Smith earned the LPGA's Patty Berg Award, bestowed to an individual who "exemplifies diplomacy, sportsmanship, goodwill and contributions to the game of golf."
- In 2000, Smith was bestowed the Commissioner's Award.
- In June 2006, Smith was selected for membership of the World Golf Hall of Fame in the Lifetime Achievement category and was inducted in October 2006.

== Professional wins (23) ==
=== LPGA Tour wins (21) ===
- 1954 (1) Fort Wayne Open
- 1955 (2) Heart of America Open, Mile High Open
- 1958 (1) Jacksonville Open
- 1959 (1) Memphis Open
- 1962 (2) Sunshine Open, Waterloo Open
- 1963 (4) **Titleholders Championship**, Peach Blossom Open, Eugene Ladies' Open, Cavern City Open
- 1964 (2) **Titleholders Championship**, Albuquerque Pro-Am
- 1965 (1) Peach Blossom Open
- 1966 (2) St. Petersburg Women's Open, Louise Suggs Delray Beach Invitational
- 1967 (2) St. Petersburg Orange Classic, Babe Zaharias Open
- 1968 (1) O'Sullivan Open
- 1970 (1) Women's Golf Charities Open
- 1972 (1) Pabst Ladies Classic

LPGA majors are shown in bold.

=== Other wins (2) ===
- 1957 Hot Springs 4-Ball (with Fay Crocker)
- 1962 Naples Pro-Am (with Mickey Wright)

== Major championships ==
=== Wins (2) ===
Year	Championship	Winning score	Margin	Runner-up
1963	Titleholders Championship	E (72-75-69-76=292)	Playoff ^{1}	(United States) Mickey Wright
1964	Titleholders Championship	+1 (73-66-77-73=289)	1 stroke	(United States) Mickey Wright

^{1} In an 18-hole playoff, Smith 72, Wright 73

== See also ==
- List of golfers with most LPGA Tour wins
