= Betsy Rawls =

American professional golfer (1928–2023)

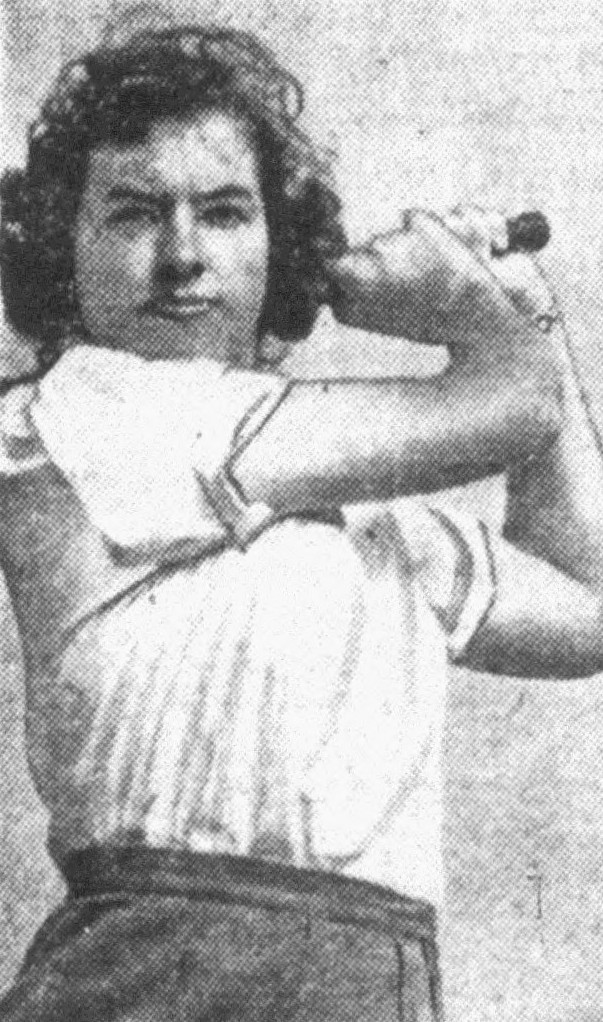
- Rawls, circa 1954

Personal information
- Full name: Elizabeth Earle Rawls
- Nickname: Betsy
- Nationality: United States
- Born: May 4, 1928 Spartanburg, South Carolina, U.S.
- Died: October 21, 2023 (aged 95) Lewes, Delaware, U.S.

Career
- Sport: Golf
- College: University of Texas
- Turned professional: 1951
- Former tour: LPGA Tour (joined 1951)
- Professional wins: 58

Number of wins by tour
- LPGA Tour: 55
- Other: 3

Best results in LPGA major championships (wins: 8)
- Western Open: Won: 1952, 1959
- Titleholders C'ship: 2nd: 1952, 1953, 1959
- Women's PGA C'ship: Won: 1959, 1969
- U.S. Women's Open: Won: 1951, 1953, 1957, 1960

Achievements and awards
- World Golf Hall of Fame: 1960 (member page)
- LPGA Tour Money Winner: 1952, 1959
- LPGA Vare Trophy: 1959
- Patty Berg Award: 1980
- Bob Jones Award: 1996
- LPGA 50th Anniversary Commissioner's Award: 2000

Elizabeth Earle Rawls (May 4, 1928 – October 21, 2023) was an American professional golfer who played on LPGA Tour. She won eight major championships and 55 LPGA Tour career events. She is a member of the World Golf Hall of Fame.

== Early life ==
In 1928, Rawls was born in Spartanburg, South Carolina. She was the daughter of Robert Miller and Mary Earle Rawls. In 1940, her family moved to Arlington, Texas.

Rawls did not start playing golf until the age of 17. She went on to graduate from Lovelady High School in Lovelady, Texas.

== Amateur career ==
In 1946, Rawls enrolled in North Texas Agricultural College (now UT-Arlington) as a physics major. As a freshman, she was recognized by faculty and department heads as a "Who's Who" in Physics, and was selected for the Phi Kappa Theta honor society.

In 1947, Rawls transferred to the University of Texas at Austin. She won the Texas Amateur in 1949 and 1950. She also won the 1949 Trans-National and the 1950 Broadmoor Invitational. She graduated from with a degree in physics in 1950.

In 1950, a few months after graduating, she finished in solo second place at the U.S. Women's Open.

== Professional career ==
In 1951, Rawls turned professional. She joined the LPGA Tour. She won her first tournament that year at the Sacramento Women's Invitational Open. She would go on to win a total of 55 events on the LPGA Tour, including eight major championships. In 1959, she earned the LPGA Vare Trophy for lowest scoring average. She was the tour's leading money winner in 1952 and 1959 and finished in the top ten on the money list a total of nine times. She led the tour in wins three times: in 1952, 1957, and 1959.

In 1961 and 1962, Rawls was the LPGA's president. Following her retirement from tournament play in 1975, she became a tournament director for the LPGA Tour. From 1987 until 2004, she was the tournament director for the McDonald's LPGA Championship at the DuPont Country Club.

== Personal life ==
Rawls died in Lewes, Delaware, on October 21, 2023, at the age of 95.

== Awards and honors ==
- Rawls was the LPGA's money winner twice: in 1952 and 1959.
- In 1959, Rawls earned the Vare Trophy, given to the LPGA golfer with the lowest scoring average.
- In 1960, the LPGA recognized her induction year into the Hall of Fame of Women's Golf as her official induction year into the LPGA Tour Hall of Fame and the World Golf Hall of Fame.
- In 1967, when the LPGA Tour Hall of Fame was created, she was one of the six inaugural inductees.
- In 1980, she was bestowed the Patty Berg Award, given to an individual who "exemplifies diplomacy, sportsmanship, goodwill and contributions to the game of golf."
- In 1996, she was voted the Bob Jones Award, the highest honor given by the United States Golf Association in recognition of distinguished sportsmanship in golf.
- In 2000, she earned the LPGA's 50th Anniversary Commissioner's Award.

== Professional wins (58) ==
=== LPGA Tour wins (55) ===
- 1951 (2) Sacramento Women's Invitational Open, **U.S. Women's Open**
- 1952 (8) Houston Weathervane, Bakersfield Open (tied with Marlene Hagge, Betty Jameson and Babe Zaharias), Seattle Weathervane, Cross Country 144 Hole Weathervane, Eastern Open, **Women's Western Open**, Carrollton Open, Thomasville Open
- 1953 (4) Barbara Romack Open, Eastern Open, **U.S. Women's Open**, Fort Worth Open
- 1954 (3) Tampa Women's Open, St. Louis Open, Texas Open
- 1955 (1) Carrollton Open
- 1956 (3) Tampa Open, Sarasota Open, Peach Blossom Open
- 1957 (5) Tampa Open, Lake Worth Open, Peach Blossom Open, **U.S. Women's Open**, Reno Open
- 1958 (2) Tampa Open, St. Petersburg Open
- 1959 (10) Lake Worth Open, Royal Crown Open, Babe Zaharias Open, Land of the Sky Open, Triangle Round Robin, **LPGA Championship**, Mt. Prospect Open, **Women's Western Open**, Waterloo Open, Opie Turner Open
- 1960 (4) Babe Zaharias Open, Cosmopolitan Open, **U.S. Women's Open**, Asheville Open
- 1961 (2) Cosmopolitan Open, Bill Brannin's Swing Parade
- 1962 (1) J.E. McAuliffe Memorial
- 1963 (1) Sunshine Women's Open
- 1964 (2) Dallas Civitan Open Invitational, Valhalla Open
- 1965 (2) Pensacola Invitational, Waterloo Open
- 1968 (1) Mickey Wright Invitational
- 1969 (1) **LPGA Championship**
- 1970 (2) Dallas Civitan Open, Cincinnati Open
- 1972 (1) GAC Classic

LPGA majors are shown in bold.

=== Other wins (3) ===
- 1951 Hollywood Four-Ball (with Betty Dodd)
- 1954 Inverness Four-Ball (with Betty MacKinnon)
- 1962 Babe Zaharias Open (tie with Kathy Cornelius)

== Major championships ==
=== Wins (8) ===
Year	Championship	Winning score	Margin	Runner(s)-up
1951	U.S. Women's Open	+5 (73-71-74-75=293)	5 strokes	(United States) Louise Suggs
1952	Women's Western Open	1 up		(United States) Betty Jameson
1953	U.S. Women's Open	+6 (75-78-74-75=302)	Playoff^{1}	(United States) Jackie Pung
1957	U.S. Women's Open	+7 (74-74-75-76=299)	6 strokes	(United States) Patty Berg
1959	LPGA Championship	+8 (76-68-69-75=288)	1 stroke	(United States) Patty Berg
1959	Women's Western Open	−1 (70-76-76-71=293)	6 strokes	(United States) JoAnne Gunderson (a), (United States) Patty Berg
1960	U.S. Women's Open	+4 (76-73-68-75=292)	1 stroke	(United States) Joyce Ziske
1969	LPGA Championship	+1 (71-72-79-71=293)	4 strokes	(United States) Susie Berning, (United States) Carol Mann

^{1} In an 18-hole playoff, Rawls 70, Pung 77.

== See also ==
- List of golfers with most LPGA Tour wins
- List of golfers with most LPGA major championship wins
