= Baral (surname) =

Bengali surname

Baral is a surname found mostly in the Bengali Hindu Suvarna Banik caste of Bengal (West Bengal and Bangladesh), and among the Bahuns of Nepal.

== Notable people ==
- Akshay Kumar Baral (1860–1918), Indian Bengali-language poet and writer
- Anup Baral (born 1968), Nepali actor, writer, and film director
- Bahadur Singh Baral (1892–1962), Nepali British Army soldier and national poet
- Babul Supriya Baral (born 1970), Indian politician and Bengali-language singer
- Happy Baral (born 1968), Bangladeshi politician
- Khadgajeet Baral (1928–2021), Nepali politician and social worker
- Krishnahari Baral (born 1954), Nepali lyricist, songwriter, poet, literary critic, author, and professor
- Mohan Baral (born 1972), Nepali singer, actor, and politician
- Sudarshan Baral (born ?), Nepali politician
- Rai Chandra Baral (1903–1981), Indian music director and composer
- Kalidas Baral, Lawer, and centre leader of Hindu, Buddhist, and Christian Oikya Parishad

== See also ==
- Boral (surname), a similarly spelled surname
