= Rebecca Stevenson =

Australian professional golfer

Personal information
- Nationality: Australia
- Born: 27 September 1978 (age 48) Gold Coast, Queensland, Australia

Career
- Sport: Golf
- Turned professional: 2002
- Former tours: Ladies European Tour (2003–07); ALPG Tour
- Professional wins: 1

Number of wins by tour
- WPGA Tour of Australasia: 1

Best results in LPGA major championships
- Chevron Championship: DNP
- Women's PGA C'ship: DNP
- U.S. Women's Open: DNP
- Women's British Open: CUT: 2003, 2006, 2007

Achievements and awards
- Ladies European Tour Rookie of the Year: 2003

Rebecca Stevenson (born 27 September 1978) is an Australian professional golfer. She played on the Ladies European Tour 2003–2007 and was LET Rookie of the Year and runner-up at the ANZ Ladies Masters in 2003.

== Amateur career ==
Stevenson was born in 1978 and grew up in Gold Coast, Queensland. She enjoyed success as an amateur and was runner-up at the 1996 Australian Girls' Amateur, losing the final to Gloria Park 2 and 1. She won the 1999 Australian Women's Amateur, and the Australian Women's Amateur Stroke Play Championship twice, in 1999 and 2001.

She represented Australia internationally and won the Tasman Cup in 1999 and 2001, the Astor Trophy in 1999, and appeared twice at the Espirito Santo Trophy, and three times at the Queen Sirikit Cup, where she won the individual title in 2001 after a playoff with Kim Joo-mi.

== Professional career ==
Stevenson finished 19th at the LET Qualifying School in late 2002 and joined the Ladies European Tour in 2003.

As a rookie, she was runner-up in her second start, finishing a stroke behind Laura Davies alongside Karrie Webb at the 2003 ANZ Ladies Masters after three rounds of 68. She finished 14th in the rankings and secured the LET Rookie of the Year title, the third Australian after Karrie Webb and Anne-Marie Knight to do so.

Stevenson clinched her maiden professional victory in the 2006 Titanium Enterprises ALPG Players Championship, a A$200,000 ALPG Tour event at Pelican Waters Golf Club in Queensland.

== Amateur wins ==
- 1999 Australian Women's Amateur, Australian Women's Amateur Stroke Play Championship
- 2001 Queen Sirikit Cup (individual winner), Australian Women's Amateur Stroke Play Championship

== Professional wins (1) ==
=== ALPG Tour wins (1) ===
- 2006 Titanium Enterprises ALPG Players Championship

== Results in LPGA majors ==
Stevenson only played in the Women's British Open

Tournament	2003	2004	2005	2006	2007
Women's British Open	CUT			CUT	CUT

Did not play

CUT = missed the half-way cut

== Team appearances ==
Amateur

- Espirito Santo Trophy (representing Australia): 1998, 2000
- Tasman Cup (representing Australia): 1999 (winners), 2001 (winners)
- Astor Trophy (representing Australia): 1999 (winners)
- Queen Sirikit Cup (representing Australia): 1999, 2000, 2001
