= Nepal Golf Association =

Sports governing body in Nepal

- Sport: Golf
- Jurisdiction: National
- Abbreviation: NGA
- Affiliation: International Golf Federation
- Regional affiliation: Asia-Pacific Golf Confederation
- Headquarters: National Sports Council, Tripureshwor, Kathmandu
- President: Tashi Ghale

Official website
- www.nga.org.np
- (Nepal)

The Nepal Golf Association (NGA) is the National Sports Federation and the Governing body of the sport of Golf in Nepal.

== History ==
The Royal Nepal Golf Club (RNGC), founded in 1917, initially managed all matters related to golf in Nepal. Its progenitor helped to promote the Nepal Golf Association to local interest following its inception. The RCGC instituted several prestigious national golf tournaments.

=== Top golf courses in Nepal ===
- Himalayan Golf Course, Pokhara
- Royal Nepal Golf Club, TIA Airport Surrounding
- Nirvana Country Club, Dharan
- Gokarna Forest Golf Course, Gokarna, KTM
- Mithila Nagari Army Golf Club, Bardibas Mahottari, 2024 established

== See also ==
- Royal Nepal Golf Club
- Surya Nepal Golf
