= List of golf courses in Nepal =

The following is list of golf courses in Nepal.

Name	City	Province	Established	Notes
Dharan Golf Club	Dharan	Koshi		
Gokarna Golf Course	Gokarneshwor	Bagmati		
Himalayan Golf Course	Pokhara	Gandaki		
Mithila Nagari Army Golf Club	Bardibas	Madhesh		
Mustang Golf Course	Lomanthang	Gandaki		World's highest altitude golf course
Royal Nepal Golf Club	Kathmandu	Bagmati	1917	
