= Australian Women's Amateur Stroke Play Championship =

Amateur golf tournament

The Australian Women's Amateur Stroke Play Championship was a national amateur golf championship played in Australia between 1992 and 2011. From 2008 to 2011, the stroke play championship also acted as the qualification event for the Australian Women's Amateur.

== Winners ==
Year	Winner	Score	To par	Margin of victory	Runner(s)-up	Venue	Ref.
Srixon Australian Women's Amateur Stroke Play Championship
2011	(New Zealand) Lydia Ko	286	−6	Playoff (Note: Ko won on the second hole of a sudden-death playoff.)	(New Zealand) Cecilia Cho	Huntingdale	
2010	(New Zealand) Cecilia Cho	287	−1	1 stroke	(Australia) Breanna Elliott (Taiwan) Liu Yi-chen	Cottesloe	
2009	(Australia) Julia Boland	290	+2	3 strokes	(Australia) Ebony Heard	Brisbane	
2008	(Australia) Stephanie Na	281	−15	7 strokes	(Australia) Kristie Smith	Glenelg	
Australian Women's Amateur Stroke Play Championship
2007	(Australia) Frances Bondad	281	−15	4 strokes	(South Korea) Ahn Shin-ae	Indooroopilly	
2006	(New Zealand) Sarah Nicholson	296		1 stroke	(South Korea) Misun Cho (Australia) Sarah Oh	The Lakes	
2005	(Australia) Sarah Kemp	289		4 strokes	(Australia) Helen Oh	Spring Valley	
2004	(South Korea) Misun Cho	286		2 strokes	(Australia) Katy Jarochowicz	The Grange	
2003	(Australia) Sarah Kemp	285		6 strokes	(Australia) Nikki Garrett (Australia) Dana Lacey	Launceston	
2002	(Australia) Vicky Uwland	291		1 stroke	(Australia) Nikki Campbell (Republic of Ireland) Rebecca Coakley	Royal Perth	
2001	(Australia) Rebecca Stevenson	284		3 strokes	(Australia) Nikki Campbell	Oxley	
2000	(Australia) Suzie Fisher	304		3 strokes	(Australia) Nadina Taylor (Australia) Joanna Whalley	Royal Sydney	
1999	(Australia) Rebecca Stevenson	290		7 strokes	(Australia) Natalie Parkinson	Woodlands	
1998	(Australia) Kate MacIntosh	294		3 strokes	(Australia) Rebecca Stevenson	Riverside	
1997	(South Korea) Gloria Park	295		5 strokes	(Australia) Joanna Whalley	Royal Adelaide	
1996	(Australia) Toni Clatworthy	300		1 stroke	(Australia) Stacey Doggett (Australia) Tanya Holl (New Zealand) Gina Scott	Royal Fremantle	
1995	(Australia) Tanya Holl	287	−7	8 strokes	(Australia) Allison Wheelhouse	Royal Melbourne	
1994	(Australia) Karrie Webb	291	+3	1 stroke	(New Zealand) Lynnette Brooky	Brisbane	
1993	(New Zealand) Lynnette Brooky	310	+10	2 strokes	(Australia) Tanya Holl	New South Wales	
1992	(Australia) Rebecca Cassey	292	E	3 strokes	(Australia) Anne-Marie Knight	Yarra Yarra	

== See also ==
- Australian Women's Amateur
