= Nancy Parbury =

Australian amateur golfer (1885–1959)

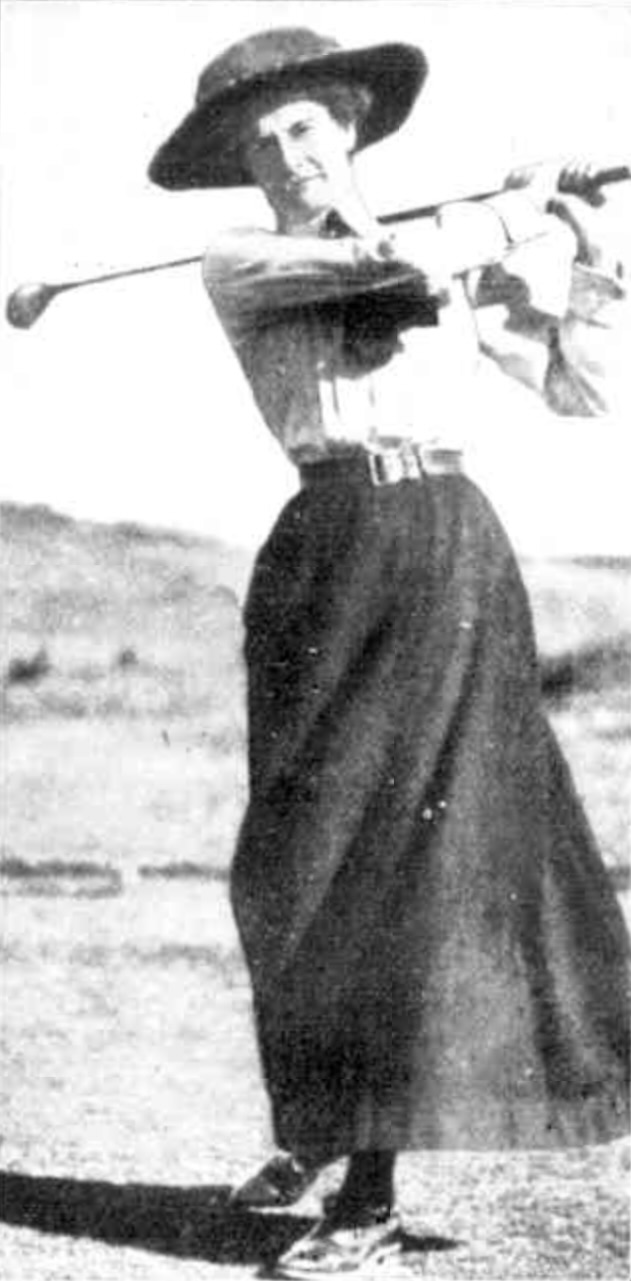
- Parbury in 1911

Personal information
- Full name: Nancy Lilian Parbury
- Nationality: Australia
- Born: 16 December 1885 Scone, New South Wales, Australia
- Died: 14 August 1959 (aged 73) England

Career
- Sport: Golf
- Status: Amateur

Nancy Lilian Parbury (16 December 1885 – 14 August 1959) was an Australian amateur golfer. She won the Australian Women's Amateur in 1910 and 1911 and won the New South Wales Women's Amateur Championship in 1910, 1911 and 1914.

== Golf career ==
Parbury was runner-up in the Australian Women's Amateur in 1907, 1908 and 1909. She was 12 strokes behind Leonora Wray in both 1907 and 1908 and 11 strokes behind Nellie Gatehouse in 1909. She was also runner-up in the New South Wales Women's Amateur Championship in same three years. The NSW event was match-play, Parbury losing in the final to Leonora Wray in 1907 and 1908 and to Nell Caird in 1909. Parbury was the favourite in 1909 but lost 2 and 1. She was also runner-up to Nellie Gatehouse in the 1909 Victorian Women's Amateur Championship. Parbury led Gatehouse by 14 strokes after the first round but finished three shots behind.

Parbury's first big success came when she won the 1910 New South Wales Women's Amateur Championship, finishing 21 strokes ahead of the runner-up, Nell Caird. The following month she won the Australian Women's Amateur beating Florence Fowler 7 and 5 in the final at Royal Adelaide. Nellie Gatehouse had led the qualifying round but was beaten 5 and 4 in the first match-play round.

Parbury retained both the New South Wales Women's Amateur Championship and the Australian Women's Amateur in 1911. She beat Ruby Lethbridge 6 and 4 in the final of the NSW amateur and then beat Winifred Duret 5 and 3 in the final of the Australian amateur, Parbury having led the qualifying in both events. Parbury was in England in 1912 and 1913, missing the important Australian events but played in the 1914 NSW amateur, where she led the qualifying and beat Nonie Purdie 4 and 3 in the final.

== Personal life ==
Parbury was born on 16 December 1885 in Scone, New South Wales, the daughter of Frederick Augustus Parbury and Helen née Ryrie. She later moved to England where she died, unmarried, on 14 August 1959.
