= New South Wales Women's Amateur Championship =

Amateur golf tournament

Tournament information
- Location: New South Wales, Australia
- Established: 1903
- Format: Match play

Current champion
- (Australia) Godiva Kim

The New South Wales Women's Amateur Championship is the state amateur golf championship of New South Wales, Australia. It was first played in 1903.

== Winners ==
Year	Winner	Score	Runner-up	Venue	Ref.
2024	Godiva Kim	3 & 2	Rachel Lee	Belmont	
2023	Shyla Singh	4 & 3	Godiva Kim	Pennant Hills	
2022	Sarah Hammett	2 & 1	Shyla Singh	Shell Cove	
2021	Grace Kim	7 & 6	Belinda Ji	Magenta Shores	
2020	Grace Kim	3 & 2	Kelsey Bennett	St. Michael's	
2019	Lisa Edgar	2 & 1	Grace Kim	Terrey Hills	
2018	Yoon Ina	2 & 1	Doey Choi	Royal Canberra	
2017	Lee So-mi	2 & 1	Choi Hye-jin	Terrey Hills	
2016	Lee Ga-young	4 & 3	Yu-Chiang Hou	Riverside Oaks	
2015	Lim Eun-bin	2 & 1	Seong Eun-jeong	Avondale	
2014	Doey Choi	5 & 4	Ali Orchard	Concord	
2013	No tournament				
2012	Hayley Bettencourt	4 & 3	Ali Orchard	Twin Creeks	

- 2011 Grace Lennon
- 2010 Sue Wooster
- 2009 Justine Lee
- 2008 Bree Arthur
- 2007 Jenny Lee
- 2006 Sarah Oh
- 2005 Sarah Oh
- 2004 Helen Oh
- 2003 Julie Swanson
- 2002 Nikki Campbell
- 2001 Nikki Campbell
- 2000 Nikki Campbell
- 1999 Carlie Butler
- 1998 Nadina Campbell
- 1997 Adele Bannerman
- 1996 Stacey Doggett
- 1995 Alison Wheelhouse
- 1994 Renee Fowler
- 1993 Karrie Webb
- 1992 Rachel Hetherington
- 1991 Cathy Neilson

Year	Winner	Score	Runner-up	Venue	Ref.
1990	Tracie Hale	7 & 6	Liz Cavill	Killara	
1989	Liz Cavill	42 holes	Erica Maxwell	The Lakes	
1988	Karen Pearce	5 & 3	Tracie Hale	Oatlands	
1987	Vicki Jellis	5 & 4	Liz Cavill	New South Wales	
1986	Edwina Kennedy	5 & 3	Jenny Sevil	Manly	
1985	Edwina Kennedy	2 & 1	Ann Wilson	Concord	
1984	Edwina Kennedy	3 & 2	Lisa Ipkendanz	Royal Sydney	
1983	Corinne Dibnah	5 & 4	Diane Pavich	Pymble	
1982	Liz Douglas	4 & 3	Janice Arnold	The Australian	
1981	Liz Cavill	4 & 2	Louise Mullard	Concord	
1980	Heather Bleeck	5 & 4	Vicki Jellis	Royal Sydney	
1979	Edwina Kennedy	4 & 3	Heather Bleeck	Elanora	
1978	Leonie Oxley	1 up	Heather Bleeck	Pymble	
1977	Julie Bretherton	2 & 1	Liz Cavill	Oatlands	
1976	Vicki Jellis	2 & 1	Gayle Gannon	New South Wales	
1975	Heather Bleeck	37 holes	Julie Bretherton	Bonnie Doon	
1974	Marea Parsons	3 & 2	Isabel Blumberg	Pymble	
1973	Isabel Blumberg	2 & 1	Vicki Jellis	The Australian	
1972	Helene Gosse	3 & 2	Carole Blair	Pennant Hills	
1971	Gayle Gannon	1 up	Rhys Wright	Royal Sydney	
1970	Anne Kenny	1 up	Rhys Wright	New South Wales	
1969	Betty Dalgleish	3 & 1	Gayle Robson	Killara	
1968	Elizabeth Blackmore	37 holes	Marea Hickey	Concord	
1967	Elizabeth Blackmore	6 & 5	Anne Kenny	Bonnie Doon	
1966	Marea Hickey	4 & 3	Beatrice Turner	The Australian	
1965	Carole Blair	6 & 4	Marea Hickey	Pennant Hills	
1964	Dianna Thomas	5 & 4	Betty Dalgleish	The Lakes	
1963	Betty Dalgleish	1 up	Pat Borthwick	New South Wales	
1962	Jill Wirth	5 & 4	Joyce Greenwood	Royal Sydney	
1961	Joyce Greenwood	5 & 3	Pam Greaves	The Australian	
1960	Marie McColl	8 & 7	Ina Brett	Pymble	
1959	Noni Broadbent	9 & 7	Mary Giddings	New South Wales	
1958	Pat Borthwick	8 & 7	Betty McKeown	Killara	
1957	Noni Broadbent	5 & 4	June Gillespie	The Australian	
1956	Mardi Mair	5 & 4	June Gillespie	Bonnie Doon	
1955	June Gillespie	9 & 8	Carol Adamson	Royal Sydney	
1954	Norma Smith	3 & 1	Barbara Gowing	The Australian	
1953	Pat Borthwick	10 & 8	Norma Smith	New South Wales	
1952	Pat Borthwick	6 & 5	Helen Stockman	Royal Sydney	
1951	Pat Borthwick	8 & 7	Mae Corry	The Australian	
1950	Norma George	6 & 5	Enid Clements	Royal Sydney	
1949	Pat Borthwick	3 & 2	Barbara Gowing	The Australian	
1948	Pat Borthwick	5 & 4	Barbara Gowing	Royal Sydney	
1947	Barbara Gowing	6 & 4	Pat Borthwick	The Australian	
1946	Marie Roskin	3 & 2	Enid Clements	The Australian	
1940–1945 No tournament due to World War II
1939	Margaret Rankin	1 up	Beth Nathan	The Australian	
1938	Pat Hore	8 & 7	Enid Clements	Royal Sydney	
1937	Phyllis Sydney-Jones	5 & 4	Vedas Ebert	The Australian	
1936	Nin Robinson	3 & 2	Nonie Pennefather	Royal Sydney	
1935	Joan Hammond	37 holes	Nin Robinson	The Australian	
1934	Joan Hammond	9 & 8	Betty Gowing	Royal Sydney	
1933	Odette Lefebvre	8 & 7	Mae Corry	The Australian	
1932	Joan Hammond	6 & 5	Vedas Ebert	Royal Sydney	
1931	Odette Lefebvre	3 & 2	Joan Hammond	Royal Sydney	
1930	Leonora Wray	5 & 4	Mrs Morgan	The Australian	
1929	Enid Clements	3 & 2	Mrs Morgan	Royal Sydney	
1928	Frances Slack	19 holes	Enid Yeldham	The Australian	
1927	Phyllis Sydney-Jones	2 & 1	Aubrey Chomley	The Australian	
1926	Marjorie Green	3 & 2	Leonora Wray	Royal Sydney	
1925	Violet Yuille	3 & 1	Marjorie Green	The Australian	
1924	Nonie Pennefather	2 up	Winifred Triglone	Royal Sydney	
1923	Winifred Triglone	5 & 3	Day Boys	The Australian	
1922	Violet Yuille	2 & 1	Day Boys	Royal Sydney	
1921	Violet Yuille	6 & 4	Mrs Thornthwaite	The Australian	
1920	Mabel Barton	19 holes	Day Boys	Royal Sydney	
1915–1919 No tournament due to World War I
1914	Nancy Parbury	4 & 3	Nonie Purdie	The Australian	
1913	Day Boys	1 up	Winifred Duret	Royal Sydney	
1912	Winifred Duret	8 & 7	Day Boys	The Australian	
1911	Nancy Parbury	6 & 4	Ruby Lethbridge	The Australian	

Year	Winner	Score	Margin of victory	Runner-up	Venue	Ref.
1910	Nancy Parbury	256	21 strokes	Nell Caird	The Australian	
1909	Nell Caird	2 & 1		Nancy Parbury	Royal Sydney	
1908	Leonora Wray	4 & 3		Nancy Parbury	The Australian	
1907	Leonora Wray	2 & 1		Nancy Parbury	The Australian	
1906	Leonora Wray	314	1 stroke	Nea Mort	The Australian	
1905	Isabel Aitken	5 & 3		Mabel Trevor-Jones	The Australian	
1904	Mabel Trevor-Jones	284	19 strokes	Ruby Lethbridge	The Australian	
1903	Mabel Trevor-Jones	312	37 strokes	Nea Mort	The Australian	

== See also ==
- New South Wales Amateur
- Australian Women's Interstate Teams Matches
