= Sarah Kemp (golfer) =

Australian professional golfer (born 1985)

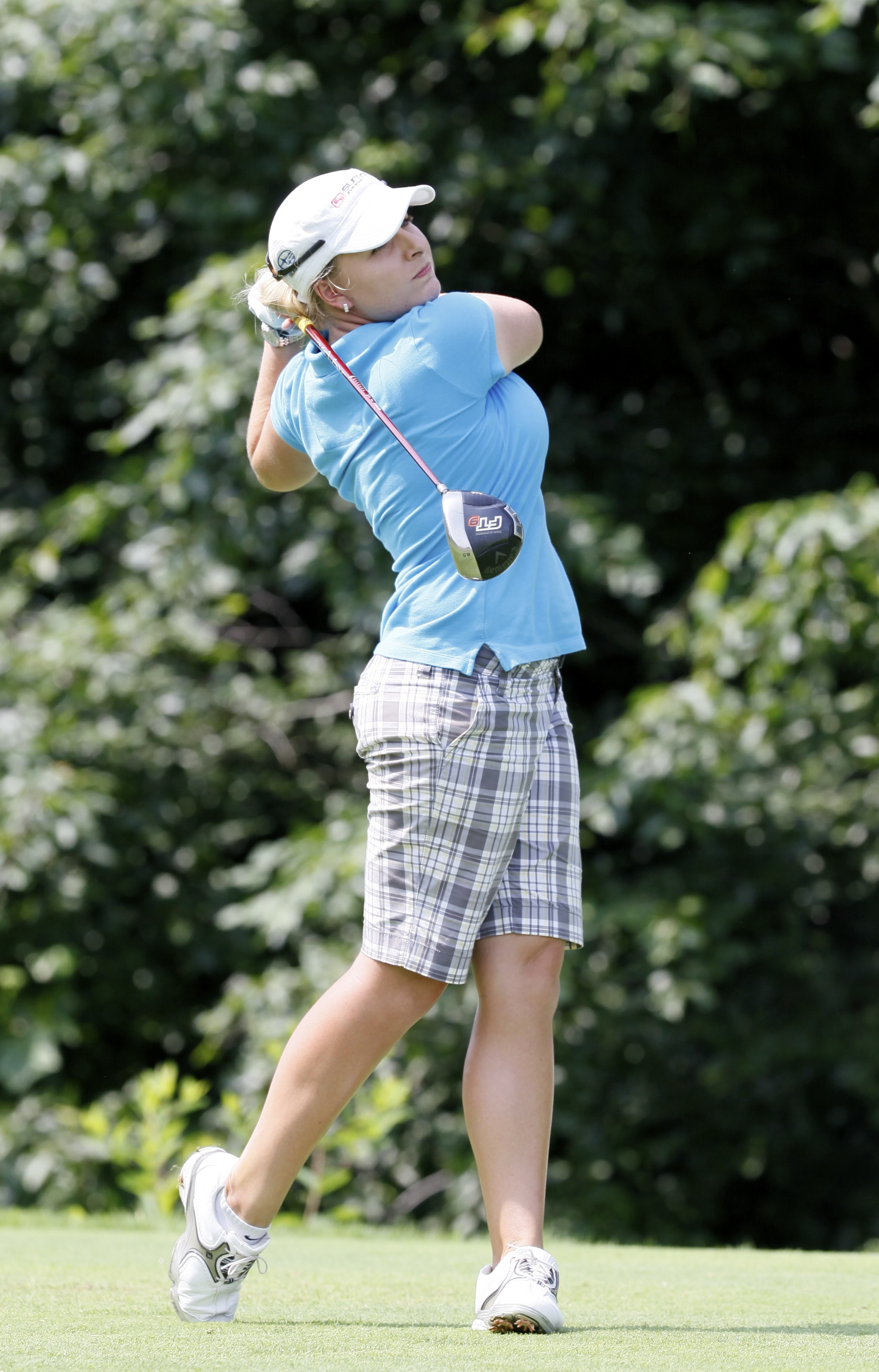

Personal information
- Nationality: Australia
- Born: 7 December 1985 (age 40) Sydney, Australia
- Height: 165 cm (5 ft 5 in)
- Spouse: Lisa Cornwell

Career
- Sport: Golf
- Turned professional: 2005
- Current tours: WPGA Tour of Australasia; Ladies European Tour; LPGA Tour
- Professional wins: 12

Number of wins by tour
- WPGA Tour of Australasia: 12

Best results in LPGA major championships
- Chevron Championship: T66: 2012
- Women's PGA C'ship: T37: 2014
- U.S. Women's Open: T29: 2024
- Women's British Open: T58: 2014
- Evian Championship: T19: 2021

Achievements and awards
- ALPG Tour Order of Merit winner: 2019

Sarah Kemp (born 7 December 1985) is an Australian professional golfer who has played on the LPGA Tour, Ladies European Tour (LET) and ALPG Tour concurrently for most of her career. She has been runner-up at the Catalonia Ladies Masters, New Zealand Women's Open, Lalla Meryem Cup and Women's Victorian Open.

== Amateur career ==
Kemp was born in Sydney and started playing golf at the age of 12. She was the top-ranked junior in New South Wales from 2001 to 2003, and top amateur in 2003. Kemp was runner-up at the 2002 Australian Girls' Amateur, and won the title in 2003. She earned low amateur honors at the 2003 Women's Australian Open, and won the Australian Women's Amateur Stroke Play Championship in 2003 and 2005.

Kemp represented Australia internationally. In 2003, she was a member of the teams that won the Commonwealth Trophy and Tasman Cup, and she played on the 2004 Espirito Santo Trophy World Cup team in Puerto Rico.

== Professional career ==
Kemp turned professional in the second half of 2005 and joined the ALPG Tour, where she in 2006 won the Titanium Ladies Golf Classic and Jack Newton Celebrity Classic in consecutive weeks. She ended her rookie season second on the ALPG Tour Order of Merit. By the end of the 2024 season, she sat 5th in the All-time Order of Merit, behind only Karrie Webb, Laura Davies, Katherine Kirk and Su Oh.

Kemp was co-medalist at LET Q-School and joined the tour in 2006, recording three top-10 finishes in her rookie season, including a 2nd place at the Catalonia Ladies Masters and a 3rd place at Ladies Open of Portugal. In 2007, she tied for 3rd at the Ladies Italian Open and Northern Ireland Ladies Open. She was runner-up at the 2010 New Zealand Women's Open and the 2018 Lalla Meryem Cup, where she lost a playoff to Jenny Haglund. She has also finished third at the 2016 Fatima Bint Mubarak Ladies Open, 2017 Hero Women's Indian Open and 2018 Lacoste Ladies Open de France.

In 2008, Kemp joined the LPGA Tour, after she birdied her final four holes at the LPGA Final Qualifying Tournament in late 2007 to tie for ninth and earn her card. Her best result on the LPGA tour was as runner-up at the 2019 Women's Victorian Open. She joined Minjee Lee, Hannah Green and Stephanie Kyriacou for the 2023 International Crown where they finished second. In 2023, at 37, she finished solo 4th at the Volunteers of America Classic and a career-high 59th in the Order of Merit.

== Amateur wins ==
- 2003 Australian Women's Amateur Stroke Play Championship, Australian Girls' Amateur, Riversdale Cup
- 2005 Australian Women's Amateur Stroke Play Championship

== Professional wins ==
=== WPGA Tour of Australasia wins (12) ===
- 2006 Optus World Coraki Golf Club Pro-Am, Titanium Ladies Golf Classic, Jack Newton Celebrity Classic
- 2007 St Georges Basin Country Club Pro-Am
- 2009 ActewAGL Royal Canberra Pro-Am
- 2010 Xstrata Coal Branxton Golf Club Pro-Am, Lady Anne Funerals ALPG Pro-Am
- 2011 Lady Anne Funerals Ryde Parramatta Pro-Am
- 2015 McLeod ALPG Pro-Am
- 2017 BWAC Regional Employment Services Pro Am
- 2018 Anita Boon Pro Am
- 2019 Aoyuan International Moss Vale Pro Am

== Playoff record ==
Ladies European Tour playoff record (0–1)

No.	Year	Tournament	Opponents	Result
1	2018	Lalla Meryem Cup	(Sweden) Jenny Haglund, (Czech Republic) Klára Spilková	Haglund won with birdie on second extra hole

== Results in LPGA majors ==
Results not in chronological order.

Tournament	2006	2007	2008	2009	2010	2011	2012
Chevron Championship							T66
Women's PGA Championship			CUT	CUT	CUT	T50	
U.S. Women's Open					67	CUT	
Women's British Open	CUT	CUT		CUT		CUT	

Tournament	2013	2014	2015	2016	2017	2018	2019	2020	2021	2022	2023	2024
Chevron Championship							CUT		CUT	CUT	CUT	T70
U.S. Women's Open						CUT	CUT		CUT	CUT		T29
Women's PGA Championship	CUT	T37	CUT	T64			CUT	CUT	CUT	T40	CUT	CUT
The Evian Championship ^	77	T67	69			CUT	T62	NT	T19	T54	T28	CUT
Women's British Open	T68	T58	CUT			CUT	T70	CUT	CUT		CUT	

^ The Evian Championship was added as a major in 2013

Did not play

CUT = missed the half-way cut
NT = no tournament
T = tied

== Team appearances ==
Amateur

- Commonwealth Trophy (representing Australia): 2003 (winners)
- Tasman Cup (representing Australia): 2003 (winners), 2005
- Queen Sirikit Cup (representing Australia): 2003, 2004, 2005
- Espirito Santo Trophy (representing Australia): 2004

Professional

- The Queens (representing Australia): 2015, 2016, 2017
- International Crown (representing Australia): 2023
