= Lynnette Brooky =

New Zealand professional golfer

Personal information
- Full name: Lynnette Teresa Brooky
- Nationality: New Zealand
- Born: 25 January 1968 (age 58) Wellington, New Zealand
- Height: 1.64 m (5 ft 5 in)
- Spouse: Ian Godleman (divorced)

Career
- Sport: Golf
- Turned professional: 1994
- Former tours: Ladies European Tour (1995–2012); ALPG Tour
- Professional wins: 9

Number of wins by tour
- Ladies European Tour: 4
- WPGA Tour of Australasia: 4
- Other: 1

Best results in LPGA major championships
- Chevron Championship: DNP
- Women's PGA C'ship: DNP
- U.S. Women's Open: T12: 2002
- du Maurier Classic: DNP
- Women's British Open: T14: 2003

Lynnette Teresa Brooky (born 25 January 1968) is a New Zealand professional golfer and former Ladies European Tour player.

== Amateur career ==
Brooky had a successful amateur career and was New Zealand Champion in both 1992 and 1993. In 1993, she was runner-up at the Ladies' British Open Amateur Stroke Play Championship, and won the Australian Women's Amateur Stroke Play Championship.

She represented New Zealand at the World Women's Amateur Team Championship for the Espirito Santo Trophy twice, and was the individual winner at the 1993 Asia-Pacific Amateur Ladies Golf Team Championship for the Queen Sirikit Cup.

== Professional career ==
Brooky turned professional in 1994, and spent her career playing mainly on the Ladies European Tour (LET). She has won four LET tournaments including back to back French Opens, one Swedish Golf Tour event, and a further four in Australia. Her best finish on the LET Order of Merit was fifth place in 2003. She represented New Zealand in the 2005 and 2007 Women's World Cup of Golf. With career earnings in excess of €1 million, she placed in the top-20 seven times on the LET Order of Merit between 1997 and 2006, and has amassed over 50 top-10 finishes worldwide.

Brooky spent many years a New Zealand's number one professional golfer, and after retiring from touring she became a teaching pro.

== Amateur wins ==
- 1992 New Zealand Strokeplay Championship
- 1993 NSW 72 Hole Strokeplay Championship, New Zealand Amateur Matchplay Championship, Australian Women's Amateur Stroke Play Championship

== Professional wins (9) ==
=== Ladies European Tour wins (4) ===
- 1998 Chrysler Ladies Austrian Open
- 2002 Arras Open de France Dames
- 2003 Arras Open de France Dames
- 2006 Open De España Femenino

=== ALPG Tour wins (4) ===
- 2003/04 Mollymook Women's Classic
- 2004/05 Peugeot Australian Rotarians ALPG Charity Classic, Sapphire Coast Ladies Classic
- 2006/07 Aristocrat Sapphire Coast Ladies Classic

=== Swedish Golf Tour wins (1) ===
- 1998 Göteborgs Kex Ladies Open

== Results in LPGA majors ==
| Tournament | 2001 | 2002 | 2003 | 2004 | 2005 | 2006 | 2007 | 2008 | 2009 | 2010 | 2011 |
|---|---|---|---|---|---|---|---|---|---|---|---|
| U.S. Women's Open | CUT | T12 | CUT | CUT | | T68 | | | | | |
| Women's British Open | T57 | CUT | T14 | T56 | CUT | T61 | | | | CUT | CUT |

Did not play

CUT = missed the half-way cut
"T" = tied

== Team appearances ==
Amateur

- Espirito Santo Trophy (representing New Zealand): 1992, 1994
- Tasman Cup (representing New Zealand): 1991 (winners), 1993
- Queen Sirikit Cup (representing New Zealand): 1993 (individual winner), 1994

Professional

- World Cup (representing New Zealand): 2005, 2006, 2007
