= Queen Sirikit Cup =

Team golf tournament

The Queen Sirikit Cup, officially the Asia-Pacific Amateur Ladies Golf Team Championship, is an annual amateur team golf championship for women organised by the Asia-Pacific Golf Confederation. The inaugural event was held in 1979. The event is named after Queen Sirikit of Thailand.

== Format ==
Teams consist of three players. The tournament is held over 4 days with 18 holes of stroke play on each day, the best two rounds counting for the team score. Up to 2019 the event was held over 3 rounds.

== Team results ==
Year	Location	Venue	Winners	Score	Margin of victory	Runners-up	Teams
2025	Japan	Phoenix Seagaia Resort, Miyazaki	South Korea	544	15 strokes	Thailand	13
2024	New Zealand	Clearwater Golf Club, Christchurch	South Korea	567	7 strokes	Japan	12
2023	Philippines	Manila Southwoods Golf & Country Club	South Korea	564	5 strokes	India	12
2022	Singapore	Laguna National Golf Resort Club	Japan	556	7 strokes	New Zealand	13
2020–21: No tournament
2019	Australia	Glenelg Golf Club	South Korea	421	16 strokes	Australia	14
2018	Thailand	Thana City Country Club	South Korea	417	Countback	Thailand	14
2017	China	Zhangjiagang Shuangshan Golf Club	South Korea	420	3 strokes	China	13
2016	Korea	The Ora Country Club, Jeju Island	South Korea	410	23 strokes	Australia	14
2015	Hong Kong	The Hong Kong Golf Club, New Course	South Korea	422	14 strokes	Philippines	13
2014	Malaysia	Saujana Golf & Country Club	South Korea	425	6 strokes	China	13
2013	Taiwan	Sunrise Golf & Country Club	Australia	437	1 stroke	Japan	11
2012	Singapore	Tanah Merah Country Club	South Korea	413	25 strokes	New Zealand	13
2011	India	Delhi Golf Club	South Korea	425	4 strokes	Philippines	14
2010	New Zealand	Hamilton Golf Club	South Korea	420	7 strokes	New Zealand	12
2009	Indonesia	Nirawana Bali Golf Club	South Korea	416	10 strokes	Chinese Taipei	12
2008	Japan	Sodegaura Country Club	South Korea	410	3 strokes	Japan	14
2007	Philippines	The Country Club	South Korea	414	20 strokes	Philippines	14
2006	Australia	Royal Adelaide Golf Club	Chinese Taipei	449	Playoff	New Zealand	13
2005	Thailand	Green Valley Country Club	Chinese Taipei	435	2 strokes	Thailand	13
2004	China	WuYi Fountain Palm Golf Club	South Korea	432	2 strokes	China	13
2003	Korea	Woo Jeong Hills Country Club	South Korea	428	8 strokes	Japan	10
2002	Malaysia	A Famosa Golf Resort	Japan	419	Playoff	South Korea	12
2001	Hong Kong	The Hong Kong Golf Club	Australia	431	5 strokes	Chinese Taipei	13
2000	Taiwan	Lin Kou International Golf & Country Club	Australia	426	2 strokes	South Korea	11
1999	New Zealand	Paraparaumu Beach Golf Club	New Zealand	436	Playoff	Chinese Taipei	11
1998	India	Bombay Presidency Golf Club	South Korea	433	5 strokes	Chinese Taipei	12
1997	Philippines	Manila Golf & Country Club	Japan	442	4 strokes	South Korea	11
1996	Thailand	Thana City Golf & Country Club	South Korea	434	4 strokes	New Zealand	12
1995	Japan	Narashino Country Club	South Korea	438	10 strokes	Japan	11
1994	Indonesia	Damai Indah Golf & Country Club	South Korea	428	3 strokes	Australia	13
1993	Australia	The Vines Resort, Perth	Japan	445	4 strokes	New Zealand	12
1992	China	Chung Shan Hot Spring Golf Club	South Korea	447	1 stroke	Australia	11
1991	Korea	Han Sung Country Club	South Korea	441	6 strokes	New Zealand	12
1990	Hong Kong	The Royal Hong Kong Golf Club	New Zealand	452	2 strokes	Australia	13
1989	New Zealand	North Shore Golf Club, Auckland	South Korea	445	6 strokes	Australia	12
1988	Thailand	Navatanee Golf Course	Australia	446	5 strokes	Japan	12
1987	Philippines	Manila Golf & Country Club	Japan	453	6 strokes	Australia	12
1986	India	Delhi Golf Club	Australia	441	8 strokes	Japan	10
1985	Malaysia	The Royal Selangor Golf Club	Australia	430	11 strokes	Japan	11
1984	New Zealand	Kooralbyn Valley Country Club	New Zealand	462	3 strokes	Australia	9
1983	Singapore	Singapore Island Country Club	Australia	449	1 stroke	Japan	9
1982	Sri Lanka	Nuwara Eliya Golf Club	Australia	450	2 strokes	Japan	9
1981	Japan	Central Golf Club, Narita	Australia	442	8 strokes	Japan	8
1980	Indonesia	Jakarta Golf Club	Japan	449	4 strokes	Australia	9
1979	Thailand	Navatanee Golf Course	Japan	459	24 strokes	Thailand	9

== Individual results ==
Year	Winner	Score	Margin of victory	Runner-up
2025	(South Korea) Oh Soo-min	267	11 strokes	(Thailand) Prim Prachnakorn
2024	(South Korea) Oh Soo-min	283	4 strokes	(Australia) Sarah Hammett
2023	(India) Avani Prashanth	272	10 strokes	(New Zealand) Fiona Xu
2022	(Japan) Mizuki Hashimoto	279	1 stroke	(Singapore) Shannon Tan
2019	(South Korea) Seo Uh-jin	211	2 strokes	(South Korea) Sohn Ye-been
2018	(Thailand) Atthaya Thitikul	203	3 strokes	(Japan) Yuna Nishimura
2017	(South Korea) Choi Hye-jin	209	Playoff	(China) Liu Wenbo
2016	(South Korea) Park Hyun-kyung	208	1 stroke	(South Korea) Choi Hye-jin
2015	(South Korea) Park Hyun-kyung	209	4 strokes	(South Korea) Jang Eun-soo
2014	(China) Shi Yuting	209	2 strokes	(Chinese Taipei) Cheng Ssu-chia
2013	(Thailand) Supamas Sangchan	214	3 strokes	(Australia) Oh Su-hyun
2012	(South Korea) Kim Hyo-joo	204	6 strokes	(New Zealand) Lydia Ko
2011	(Philippines) Dottie Ardina	211	1 stroke	(South Korea) Kim Hyo-joo
2010	(South Korea) Kim Hyo-joo	206	8 strokes	(Chinese Taipei) Yao Hsuan-yu
2009	(South Korea) Jang Ha-na	207	2 strokes	(South Korea) Kim Sei-young
2008	(South Korea) Han Jung-eun	200	10 strokes	(Japan) Mika Miyazato
2007	(South Korea) Ryu So-yeon	204	6 strokes	(South Korea) Choi He-yong
2006	(South Korea) Hur Mi-jung	220	1 stroke	(New Zealand) Natasha Krishna
2005	(Chinese Taipei) Tseng Ya-ni	209	6 strokes	(Thailand) Titiya Plucksataporn
2004	(Japan) Shinobu Moromizato	213	2 strokes	(Thailand) Nontaya Srisawang
2003	(South Korea) Song Bo-bae	210	6 strokes	(Japan) Ai Miyazato
2002	(Taiwan) Hung Chin-huei	207	Playoff	(Japan) Ai Miyazato
2001	(Australia) Rebecca Stevenson	214	Playoff	(South Korea) Kim Joo-mi
2000	(Australia) Helen Beatty	211	1 stroke	(South Korea) Kim Joo-yun
1999	(Taiwan) Wei Yun-jye	213	4 strokes	(New Zealand) Tina Howard
1998	(South Korea) Jang Jeong	216	3 strokes	(Chinese Taipei) Wei Yun-jye
1997	(Australia) Kate MacIntosh	218	2 strokes	(Philippines) Jennifer Rosales
1996	(South Korea) Han Hee-won	208	10 strokes	(Australia) Simone Williams
1995	(South Korea) Kim Mi-hyun	219	4 strokes	(South Korea) Kang Yoo-yun
1994	(South Korea) Han Hee-won	210	4 strokes	(Australia) Karrie Webb
1993	(New Zealand) Lynnette Brooky	223	1 stroke	(Australia) Joanne Mills
1992	(Malaysia) Lim Ai Lian	221	Countback	(China) Wong Li-xia
1991	(New Zealand) Marnie McGuire	219	Countback	(South Korea) Won Jae-sook
1990	(New Zealand) Jan Higgins	221	4 strokes	(South Korea) Won Jae-sook
1989	(Australia) Helen Kight	219	4 strokes	(South Korea) Yeum Sung-mi
1988	(South Korea) Won Jae-sook	221	2 strokes	(Japan) Asako Kita
1987	(Japan) Michiko Hattori	217	9 strokes	(Australia) Edwina Kennedy
1986	(Australia) Edwina Kennedy	221	2 strokes	(Australia) Helen Greenwood
1985	(Australia) Louise Briers	213	3 strokes	(Japan) Michiko Hattori
1984	(New Zealand) Brenda Ormsby	226	4 strokes	(Australia) Corinne Dibnah
1983	(Japan) Hiromi Kobayashi	222	1 stroke	(Australia) Corinne Dibnah
1982	(Japan) Miki Oda	220	3 strokes	(Australia) Edwina Kennedy
1981	(Australia) Lindy Goggin	218	6 strokes	(Australia) Jane Lock
1980	(Japan) Miki Oda	222	2 strokes	(Sri Lanka) Tiru Fernando
1979	(Japan) Haruyo Miyazawa	229	1 stroke	(Japan) Haruko Ishii

== Teams ==
The following teams have competed:

Team	Appearances	Years competed
Australia	43	1980–2022, 2024–2025
China	31	1989–1998, 2001–2012, 2014–2023, 2025
Chinese Taipei	26	1998–2025
Hong Kong	40	1979, 1985–2025
India	45	1979–2025
Indonesia	39	1979–1997, 1999–2002, 2004, 2007–2009, 2011–2012, 2014–2025
Japan	45	1979–2025
Malaysia	42	1979–1980, 1982–1994, 1996–2002, 2004–2012, 2014–2025
Myanmar	4	2016, 2018–2022
New Zealand	39	1984–2024
Philippines	42	1980–1985, 1987–2002, 2004–2025
Singapore	36	1979–1991, 1993–1995, 2003–2008, 2010–2026
South Korea	38	1979, 1987–2025
Sri Lanka	19	1979–1983, 1985–1988, 1990, 1994, 1996, 1998, 2001, 2005–2008, 2011
Thailand	45	1979–2025
Vietnam	1	2025

=== Australia ===
Australia did not compete in 1979 or 2023.

- 1980 Jane Crafter, Jane Lock, Sue Tonkin
- 1981 Lindy Goggin, Jane Lock, Sue Tonkin
- 1982 Lindy Goggin, Dennise Hutton, Edwina Kennedy
- 1983 Louise Briers, Corinne Dibnah, Edwina Kennedy
- 1984 Corinne Dibnah, Edwina Kennedy, Sandra McCaw
- 1985 Louise Briers, Sandra McCaw, Sue Tonkin
- 1986 Helen Greenwood, Edwina Kennedy, Sandra McCaw
- 1987 Louise Briers, Edwina Kennedy, Ericka Maxwell
- 1988 Liz Cavill, Nicole Lowien, Mardi Lunn
- 1989 Louise Briers, Liz Cavill, Helen Kight
- 1990 Wendy Doolan, Sarah Gautrey, Jane Shearwood
- 1991 Louise Briers, Wendy Doolan, Jane Shearwood
- 1992 Anne-Marie Knight, Loraine Lambert, Karrie Webb
- 1993 Ericka Jayatilaka, Joanne Mills, Karrie Webb
- 1994 Anne-Marie Knight, Karrie Webb, Simone Williams
- 1995 Tanya Holl, Terri McKinnon, Alison Wheelhouse
- 1996 Stacey Doggett, Kate MacIntosh, Simone Williams
- 1997 Tamie Durdin, Kate MacIntosh, Simone Williams
- 1998 Adele Bannerman, Michelle Ellis, Kate MacIntosh
- 1999 Sandy Grimshaw, Natalie Parkinson, Rebecca Stevenson
- 2000 Helen Beatty, Rebecca Stevenson, Nadina Taylor
- 2001 Helen Beatty, Rebecca Stevenson, Nadina Taylor
- 2002 Nikki Campbell, Rebecca Coakley, Vicky Uwland
- 2003 Melanie Holmes-Smith, Katy Jarochowicz, Sarah Kemp
- 2004 Sarah Kemp, Sarah-Jane Kenyon, Dana Lacey
- 2005 Emma Bennett, Nikki Garrett, Sarah Kemp
- 2006 Emma Bennett, Sunny Park, Anna Parsons
- 2007 Emma Bennett, Stephanie Na, Kristie Smith
- 2008 Clare Choi, Stephanie Na, Kristie Smith
- 2009 Julia Boland, Rebecca Flood, Stacey Keating
- 2010 Ebony Heard, Stacey Keating, Justine Lee
- 2011 Breanna Elliott, Ashley Ona, Jessica Speechly
- 2012 Breanna Elliott, Whitney Hillier, Oh Su-hyun
- 2013 Minjee Lee, Grace Lennon, Oh Su-hyun
- 2014 Hannah Green, Cathleen Santoso, Shelley Shin
- 2015 Elizabeth Elmassian, Hannah Green, Rebecca Kay
- 2016 Robyn Choi, Karis Davidson, Hannah Green
- 2017 Karis Davidson, Alizza Hetherington, Rebecca Kay
- 2018 Stephanie Bunque, Rebecca Kay, Grace Kim
- 2019 Doey Choi, Steph Kyriacou, Julienne Soo
- 2022 Kelsey Bennett, Caitlin Peirce, Kirsten Rudgeley
- 2024 Justice Bosio, Caitlin Peirce, Sarah Hammett

=== New Zealand ===
New Zealand did not compete until 1984.

- 1984 Janice Arnold, Brenda Rhodes, Jan Scandrett
- 1985 Janice Arnold, Jan Scandrett, Debbie Smith
- 1986 Liz Douglas, Karrin Duckworth, Marnie McGuire
- 1987 Tracey Hanson, Brenda Ormsby, Debbie Smith
- 1988 Jan Cooke, Tracey Hanson, Ingrid Van Steenbergen
- 1989 Tracey Hanson, Sheree Higgens, Jan Higgins
- 1990 Lisa Aldridge, Jan Higgins, Annette Stott
- 1991 Lisa Aldridge, Jan Higgins, Marnie McGuire
- 1992 Lisa Aldridge, Susan Farron, Annette Stott
- 1993 Lisa Aldridge, Lynnette Brooky, Susan Farron
- 1994 Lynnette Brooky, Susan Farron, Gina Scott
- 1995 Catherine Knight, Gina Scott, Kerryn Starr
- 1996 Renee Fowler, Catherine Knight, Gina Scott
- 1997 Renee Fowler, Catherine Knight, Brenda Ormsby
- 1998 Renee Fowler, Tina Howard, Brenda Ormsby
- 1999 Lisa Aldridge, Renee Fowler, Tina Howard
- 2000 Chun Hee-jeong, Claire Dury, Wendy Hawkes
- 2001 Anita Boon, Chun Hee-jeong, Tina Howard
- 2002 Anita Boon, Tina Howard, Brenda Ormsby
- 2003 Enu Chung, Tina Howard, Penny Newbrook
- 2004 Enu Chung, Penny Newbrook, Sarah Nicholson
- 2005 Sharon Ahn, Natasha Krishna, Sarah Nicholson
- 2006 Sharon Ahn, Natasha Krishna, Sarah Nicholson
- 2007 Natasha Krishna, Dasom Lee, Penny Newbrook
- 2008 Cathryn Bristow, Tammy Clelland, Dana Kim
- 2009 Zoe Brake, Larissa Eruera, Emily Perry
- 2010 Zoe Brake, Cecilia Cho, Lydia Ko
- 2011 Cecilia Cho, Lydia Ko, Emily Perry
- 2012 Chantelle Cassidy, Lydia Ko, Emily Perry
- 2013 Julianne Alvarez, Lita Guo, Munchin Keh
- 2014 Julianne Alvarez, Munchin Keh, Wenyung Keh
- 2015 Julianne Alvarez, Munchin Keh, Wenyung Keh
- 2016 Alanna Campbell, Chantelle Cassidy, Munchin Keh
- 2017 Alanna Campbell, Amelia Garvey, Rose Zheng
- 2018 Brittney Dryland, Juliana Hung, Caryn Khoo
- 2019 Juliana Hung, Carmen Lim, Vivian Lu
- 2022 Eunseo Choi, Vivian Lu, Fiona Xu
- 2023 Eunseo Choi, Vivian Lu, Fiona Xu
- 2024 Eunseo Choi, Vivian Lu, Amy Im

=== South Korea ===
South Korea did not compete from 1980 to 1986.

- 1979 Cho Dong-sun, Kim Myung-sun, Park Bong-sum
- 1987 Lee Eun-hwa, Won Jae-sook, Yeum Sung-mi
- 1988 Lee Jong-im, Won Jae-sook, Yeum Sung-mi
- 1989 Lee Jong-im, Won Jae-sook, Yeum Sung-mi
- 1990 Lee Jong-im, Shin So-ra, Won Jae-sook
- 1991 Chung Il-mi, Shin So-ra, Won Jae-sook
- 1992 Kwon Oh-yun, Song Chae-eun, Suh Ah-ram
- 1993 Pak Se-ri, Suh Ji-hyun, Yeum Sung-mi
- 1994 Han Hee-won, Pak Se-ri, Song Chae-eun
- 1995 Han Hee-won, Kang Yoo-yun, Kim Mi-hyun
- 1996 Han Hee-won, Park Na-mee, Song Eun-jin
- 1997 Han Hee-won, Kim Kyung-sook, Park So-young
- 1998 Cho Kyung-hee, Jeong Jang, Kim Kyung-sook
- 1999 Cho Kyung-hee, Kim Joo-yun, Oh Mi-sun
- 2000 Cho Rynng-ah, Kim Joo-yun, Lim Sun-wook
- 2001 Ahn Shi-hyun, Kim Joo-mi, Kim So-hee
- 2002 Kim Joo-mi, Lim Sung-ah, Moon Hyun-hee
- 2003 Park Hee-young, Song Bo-bae, Woo Ji-yun
- 2004 Choo Ji-young, Chung Da-sol, Park Hee-young
- 2005 Choo Ji-young, Chung Da-sol, Park Hee-young
- 2006 Choi He-yong, Hur Mi-jung, Ryu So-yeon
- 2007 Choi He-yong, Kim Sei-young, Ryu So-yeon
- 2008 Han Jung-eun, Heo Yoon-kyung, Yang Soo-jin
- 2009 Jang Ha-na, Kim Sei-young, Park Sun-young
- 2010 Han Jung-eun, Kim Hyo-joo, Kim Ji-hee
- 2011 Chin In-gee, Kim Hyo-joo, Kim Ji-hee
- 2012 Baek Kyu-jung, Kim Hyo-joo, Park Chae-yoon
- 2013 Park Gye-ol, Park Ji-yeon, Yu Go-un
- 2014 Choi Hye-jin, Lee So-young, Park Gye-ol
- 2015 Jang Eun-soo, Lee Joung-eun, Park Hyun-kyung
- 2016 Choi Hye-jin, Lee Ga-young, Park Hyun-kyung
- 2017 Choi Hye-jin, Lee Ga-young, Lee So-mi
- 2018 Cho A-yean, Jeong Yun-ji, Lim Hee-jeong
- 2019 Lee Ye-won, Seo Uh-jin, Sohn Ye-been
- 2022 Bang Shin-sil, Kim Min-byeol, Lee Ji-hyun
- 2023 Kim Min-sol, Seo Kyo-rim, Yoo Hyun-jo
- 2024 Lee Hyo-song, Kim Shi-hyun, Oh Soo-min

=== Thailand ===
- 1979 Napasri Buranasiri, Nudeenuj Bunyaketu, Salika Fryett
- 1980 Napasri Buranasiri, Nudeenuj Bunyaketu, Samorn Thappavibul
- 1981 Napasri Buranasiri, Nudeenuj Bunyaketu, Prasertsri Krupanich
- 1982 Napasri Buranasiri, Nudeenuj Bunyaketu, Prasertsri Krupanich
- 1983 Napasri Buranasiri, Prasertsri Krupanich, Samorn Thappavibul
- 1984 Nudeenuj Bunyaketu, Prasertsri Krupanich, Rika Dila
- 1985 Napasri Buranasiri, Nudeenuj Bunyaketu, Rika Dila
- 1986 Nudeenuj Bunyaketu, Rika Dila, Sarinee Leksuwan
- 1987 Rika Dila, Sarinee Leksuwan, Sumon Phucharoen
- 1988 Nudeenuj Bunyaketu, Samorn Thappavibul, Sumon Phucharoen
- 1989 Nareenuch Meeposom, Nudeenuj Bunyaketu, Sumon Phucharoen
- 1990 Nareenuch Meeposom, Nudeenuj Bunyaketu, Sumon Phucharoen
- 1991 Nareenuch Meeposom, Nudeenuj Bunyaketu, Sumon Phucharoen
- 1992 Kasem Knipe, Nareenuch Meeposom, Sumon Phucharoen
- 1993 Nareenuch Meeposom, Rungthiwa Pangjan, Russamee Gulyanamitta
- 1994 Nareenuch Meeposom, Rungthiwa Pangjan, Sasikarn Uttachan
- 1995 Nareenuch Meeposom, Pearwan Udompansa, Rungthiwa Pangjan
- 1996 Rungthiwa Pangjan, Russamee Gulyanamitta, Sontipa Tipsanit
- 1997 Jaruwan Gulyanamitta, Russamee Gulyanamitta, Virada Nirapathpongporn
- 1998 Chataya Chanachai, Jaruwan Gulyanamitta, Walailak Satarak
- 1999 Jaruwan Gulyanamitta, Rungthiwa Pangjan, Russamee Gulyanamitta
- 2000 Choosri Hawthorne, Rungthiwa Pangjan, Titiya Plucksataporn
- 2001 Irin Khandhajavana, Onnarin Sattayabanphot, Titiya Plucksataporn
- 2002 Chataya Chanachai, Suteera Chanachai, Titiya Plucksataporn
- 2003 Nontaya Srisawang, Praewnapa Phol-Auyporn, Suteera Chanachai
- 2004 Nontaya Srisawang, Porani Chutichai, Praewnapa Phol-Auyporn
- 2005 Pornanong Phatlum, Tiranun Yoopan, Titiya Plucksataporn
- 2006 Juntima Gulyanamita, Suteera Chanachai, Tharinee Plucksataporn
- 2007 Chayuda Singhsuwan, Thidapa Suwannapura, Yupaporn Kawinpakorn
- 2008 Chayuda Singhsuwan, Jaruporn Palakawong Na Ayudhya, Saruttaya Ngam-Usawan
- 2009 Banchalee Theinthong, Paveenuch Sritragul, Yupaporn Kawinpakorn
- 2010 Jaruporn Palakawong Na Ayudhya, Thidapa Suwannapura, Yupaporn Kawinpakorn
- 2011 Dolnapa Phudtipinij, Jaruporn Palakawong Na Ayudhya, Yupaporn Kawinpakorn
- 2012 Pinrath Loomboonruang, Savitree Thavong, Supamas Sangchan
- 2013 Benyapa Niphatsophon, Ornicha Konsunthea, Supamas Sangchan
- 2014 Budsabakorn Sukapan, Sherman Santiwiwatthanaphong, Supamas Sangchan
- 2015 Chayanit Wangmahaporn, Onkanok Soisuwan, Paphangkorn Tavatanakit
- 2016 Atthaya Thitikul, Onkanok Soisuwan, Paphangkorn Tavatanakit
- 2017 Atthaya Thitikul, Onkanok Soisuwan, Tunrada Piddon
- 2018 Atthaya Thitikul, Natthakritta Vongtaveelap, Tunrada Piddon
- 2019 Chanettee Wannasaen, Natthakritta Vongtaveelap, Yosita Khawnuna
- 2022 Natthakritta Vongtaveelap, Pimpisa Rubrong, Thitikarn Thapasit
- 2023 Achiraya Sriwong, Namo Luangnitikul, Thitikarn Thapasit
- 2024 Achiraya Sriwong, Namo Luangnitikul, Pimpisa Rubrong
- 2025 Achiraya Sriwong, Prim Prachnakorn, Thitikarn Thapasit
