= Marnie McGuire =

New Zealand golfer

Personal information
- Full name: Marnie McGuire
- Nationality: New Zealand
- Born: 22 February 1969 (age 57) Auckland, New Zealand
- Height: 5 ft 3 in (1.60 m)

Career
- Sport: Golf
- College: Oklahoma State
- Turned professional: 1992
- Former tours: LPGA of Japan Tour; LPGA Tour; ALPG Tour
- Professional wins: 6

Number of wins by tour
- Ladies European Tour: 1
- LPGA of Japan Tour: 5
- WPGA Tour of Australasia: 1

Marnie McGuire (born 22 February 1969) is a former New Zealand professional golfer who played mostly on the LPGA of Japan Tour.

McGuire won the British Ladies Amateur in 1986 as a 17-year-old and was at the time the youngest champion in the tournament's history. She was also the individual winner of the 1991 Queen Sirikit Cup. She played college golf at Oklahoma State where she was an All-American in 1990. While at Oklahoma State, she was diagnosed with melanoma, which led her to compete wearing long-sleeved shirts, a big floppy hat, and long slacks.

McGuire won five times as a professional on the Japan Tour and was awarded the Sportswoman of the Year title at the 1996 Halberg Awards. She is the only New Zealander to have won the Women's Australian Open, and the British Ladies Amateur. She also played on the LPGA Tour from 1999 to 2003.

== Amateur wins ==
- 1986 British Ladies Amateur
- 1991 Queen Sirikit Cup (individual title)

== Professional wins (6) ==
=== LPGA of Japan Tour wins (5) ===
- 1994 Nasu Ogawa Ladies
- 1995 Goyo Kenetsu Open, Daikin Orchid Ladies
- 1996 Mitsukoshi Cup
- 1998 Suntory Ladies Open

=== ALPG Tour wins (1) ===
- 1998 AAMI Women's Australian Open^{1}

=== Ladies European Tour wins (1) ===
- 1998 AAMI Women's Australian Open^{1}

^{1} Co-sanctioned by ALPG Tour and Ladies European Tour

== Team appearances ==
Amateur

- Espirito Santo Trophy (representing New Zealand): 1986
- Commonwealth Trophy (representing New Zealand): 1991
- Queen Sirikit Cup (representing New Zealand): 1986, 1991 (individual winner)

Awards
Preceded by Sarah Ulmer	New Zealand's Sportswoman of the Year; 1995	Succeeded by Barbara Kendall
