= Maddison Hinson-Tolchard =

Australian professional golfer (born 2002)

Personal information
- Nationality: Australia
- Born: 27 January 2002 (age 24) Perth, Western Australia
- Height: 167 cm (5 ft 6 in)

Career
- Sport: Golf
- College: Oklahoma State University
- Turned professional: 2024
- Current tours: WPGA Tour of Australasia (joined 2025); Ladies European Tour (joined 2025)
- Former tour: Epson Tour (joined 2024)

Best results in LPGA major championships
- Chevron Championship: DNP
- Women's PGA C'ship: DNP
- U.S. Women's Open: CUT: 2023
- Women's British Open: DNP
- Evian Championship: DNP

Achievements and awards
- Big 12 Player of the Year: 2022, 2023
- Karrie Webb Award: 2022, 2023

Maddison Hinson-Tolchard (born 27 January 2002) is an Australian professional golfer who plays on the WPGA Tour of Australasia and the Ladies European Tour. She was runner-up in the team event at the 2025 Aramco Houston Championship.

== Early life and amateur career ==
Hinson-Tolchard grew up in Perth, Western Australia and practiced at Gosnells Golf Club. She started competing at age 8 and won the 2017 Western Australia Amateur and the 2018 Australian Girls' Amateur. In 2019, she was runner-up at the IMG Academy Junior World Championship. She competed in the 2023 U.S. Women's Open and the Women's Australian Open in 2019 and 2022, making the cut in 2022.

Hinson-Tolchard represented Australia at the 2022 Espirito Santo Trophy at Le Golf National in Paris, and the 2023 Espirito Santo Trophy in Abu Dhabi, where she tied for 6th with Australia and 8th individually.

Hinson-Tolchard was educated at Penrhos College, Perth and attended Oklahoma State University between 2020 and 2024. Playing with the Oklahoma State Cowgirls golf team, she was the Big 12 Championship Individual Champion in 2023 and named the Big 12 Player of the Year in both 2022 and 2023. She finished 4th at the 2023 NCAA Division I Women's Golf Championship, two strokes behind winner Rose Zhang.

== Professional career ==
Hinson-Tolchard turned professional in June 2024 and joined the Epson Tour mid-season, where she made ten starts and six cuts.

In 2025, she joined the WPGA Tour of Australasia where she tied for 4th at the World Sand Greens Championship, and the Ladies European Tour, where she recorded her first individual top-10 finish at the Tenerife Women's Open. She was runner-up in the team event at the Aramco Houston Championship, playing together with Céline Boutier, Luna Sobron Galmes and Magdalena Simmermacher.

== Amateur wins ==
- 2017 Western Australia Amateur
- 2018 Australian Girls' Amateur, Victorian Women's Amateur Championship
- 2021 Women's Southern GA Amateur
- 2022 NCAA Stillwater Regional
- 2023 Big 12 Women's Championship

== Team appearances ==
Amateur

- Australian Women's Interstate Teams Matches (representing Western Australia): 2017, 2018, 2019
- Junior Golf World Cup (representing Australia): 2019
- Espirito Santo Trophy (representing Australia): 2022, 2023
- Patsy Hankins Trophy (representing Asia/Pacific): 2023
- Arnold Palmer Cup (representing the International Team): 2023
