= Edwina Kennedy =

Australian golfer

Personal information
- Full name: Edwina Jane Kirkby
- Born: 10 June 1959 (age 67) Sydney, Australia
- Spouse: Vaugan Kirkby (1988-)
- Children: 2

Career
- Sport: Golf
- Status: Amateur

Best results in LPGA major championships
- U.S. Women's Open: T56: 1981

Achievements and awards
- Medal of the Order of Australia: 1985
- Australian Sports Medal: 2000

Edwina Jane Kirkby, née Kennedy, (born 10 June 1959) is a former Australian amateur golfer. In 1978, she was the first Australian to win the British Ladies Amateur and was a member of the winning 1978 Australian Espirito Santo Trophy team.

== Early life and education ==
In 1959, Kennedy was born in Sydney, Australia. During her childhood, Kennedy played at a golf club in Wentworth Falls, New South Wales. For her post-secondary education, Kennedy went to Macquarie University for a degree in economics.

== Amateur career ==
During the 1970s and 1980s, Kennedy won multiple amateur golf championships throughout Australia. Some of her Australian championship titles during this time period include back to back wins at the Australian Girls' Amateur from 1976 to 1979 and the Australian Women's Amateur in 1986. While competing in golf, Kennedy worked in industrial relations after completing her university degree. In specific parts of Australia, Kennedy first won the New South Wales Women's Amateur Championship in 1979 before adding back to back NSW wins from 1984 to 1986.

Outside of Australia, Kennedy, on her 19 years birthday, became the first golfer from Australia to win the British Ladies Amateur in 1978.

Years later, Kennedy won the 1980 Canadian Women's Amateur. Kennedy competed at the 1981 U.S. Women's Open and finished the event in a tie for 56th place. In New Zealand, Kennedy won multiple events in 1985 including the amateur championship.

At team events, Kennedy was a member of the Australian golf team that won the Tasman Cup five times between 1977 and 1989. At the Espirito Santo Trophy with the Australian team, Kennedy won gold in 1978 and silver at the following event in 1980. As a Commonwealth Trophy player for Australia from 1979 to 1991, Kennedy and her team won the 1983 event. During this time period, Kennedy and her team were second in 1979 and 1987 while also placing third in 1991.

Kennedy said in 1986 that she considered turning professional after completing her university studies, but never enjoyed the lifestyle on tour and remained an amateur.

Kennedy ended her golf career in 1993 while working in workers' compensation.

== Awards and honors ==
Kennedy received the Medal of the Order of Australia in 1985 and the Australian Sports Medal in 2000 for her golf career. For hall of fames, Kennedy was inducted into the Sport Australia Hall of Fame in 1993.

== Amateur wins ==
- 1976 Australian Girls' Amateur
- 1977 Australian Girls' Amateur
- 1978 Australian Girls' Amateur, British Ladies Amateur
- 1979 Australian Girls' Amateur, New South Wales Women's Amateur Championship
- 1980 Canadian Women's Amateur
- 1981 Western Australia Championship
- 1982 Western Australia Championship
- 1983 Western Australia Championship
- 1984 New South Wales Women's Amateur Championship
- 1985 New Zealand Amateur Championship, New South Wales Women's Amateur Championship, Western Australia Championship, Victoria Amateur Championship
- 1986 Australian Women's Amateur, New South Wales Women's Amateur Championship

== Team appearances ==
- Espirito Santo Trophy (representing Australia): 1978 (winners), 1980, 1984, 1986
- Commonwealth Trophy (representing Australia): 1979, 1983 (winners), 1987, 1991
- Tasman Cup (representing Australia): 1977 (winners), 1983 (winners), 1985 (winners), 1987 (tied), 1989 (winners)
- Queen Sirikit Cup (representing Australia): 1982 (winners), 1983 (winners), 1984, 1986 (winners, individual winner), 1987
- Gladys Hay Memorial Cup (representing New South Wales): 1977 (winners), 1978 (winners), 1979, 1980, 1982, 1983 (winners), 1984 (winners), 1985 (winners), 1986 (winners), 1987, 1988 (winners), 1989, 1990 (winners), 1991 (winners), 1992 (winners), 1993
