= Grace Kim (golfer) =

Australian professional golfer (born 2000)

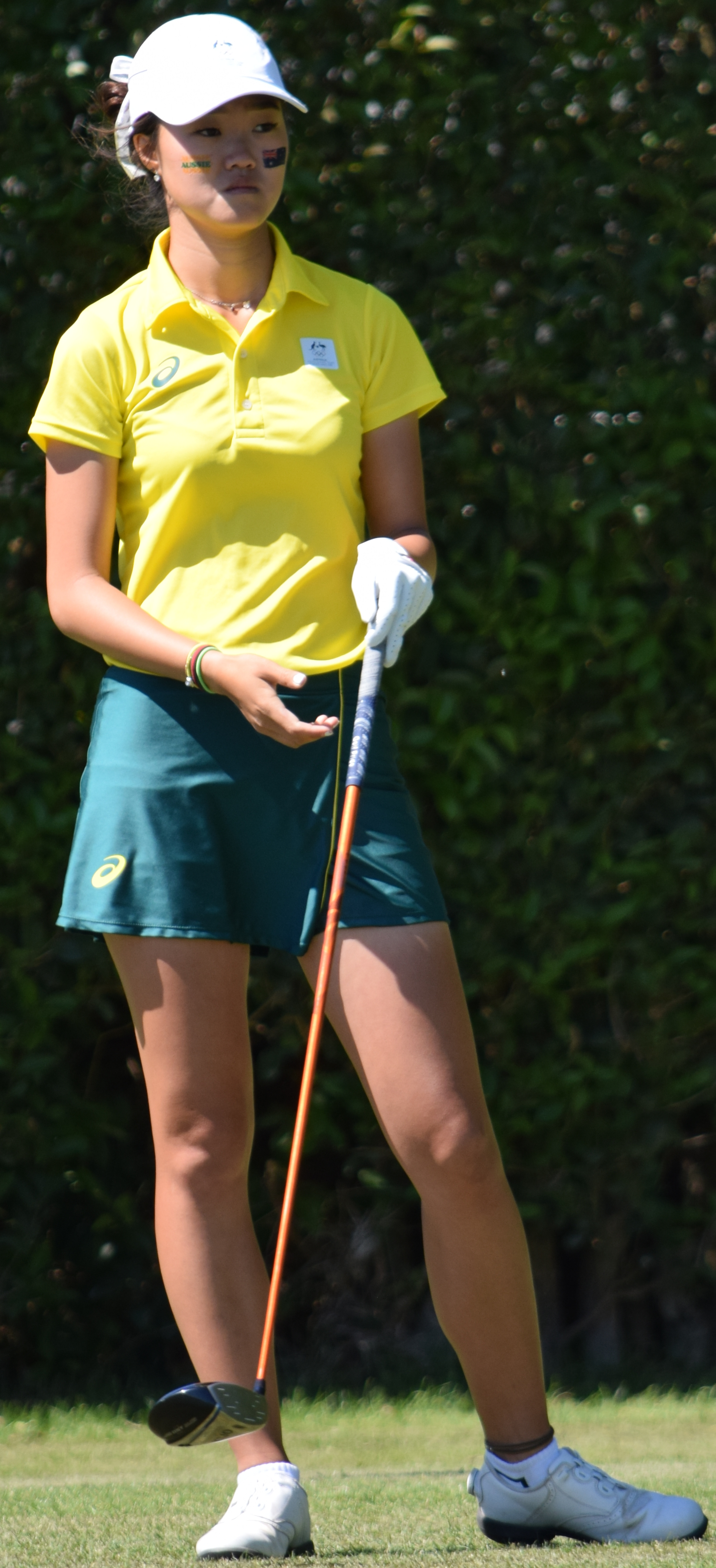

Personal information
- Nationality: Australia
- Born: 13 December 2000 (age 25) Sydney, NSW, Australia
- Height: 5 ft 6 in (168 cm)

Career
- Sport: Golf
- Turned professional: 2021
- Current tours: LPGA Tour (joined 2023); WPGA Tour of Australasia
- Former tour: Epson Tour
- Professional wins: 7

Number of wins by tour
- LPGA Tour: 2
- Ladies European Tour: 1
- WPGA Tour of Australasia: 2
- Epson Tour: 1
- Other: 2

Best results in LPGA major championships (wins: 1)
- Chevron Championship: T59: 2025
- Women's PGA C'ship: 14th: 2023
- U.S. Women's Open: T13: 2023
- Women's British Open: T36: 2023
- Evian Championship: Won: 2025

Achievements and awards
- Golf NSW Female Player of the Year: 2019
Medal record
Youth Olympic Games
Gold medal – first place	2018 Buenos Aires	Girls' individual
Korean National Sports Festival
Gold medal – first place	2019 Seoul	Int'l Women's individual

Grace Kim (born 13 December 2000) is a Korean-Australian professional golfer who plays on the LPGA Tour. She won the TPS Sydney on the ALPG Tour in 2021 and 2022. As an amateur, she won the Australian Girls' Amateur, Australian Women's Amateur and the 2018 Summer Youth Olympics.

== Career ==
Kim, raised in Greenacre, New South Wales by Korean parents, enjoyed a stellar amateur career and in 2019 reached No. 29 in the World Amateur Golf Ranking to become Australia's highest-ranked female amateur. She amassed a number of titles, including the 2017 Australian Girls' Amateur and the 2018 Annika Invitational Australasia in New Zealand with rounds of 72, 62 and 68 (−16). After back-to-back wins in the NSW Women's Amateur in 2020 and 2021, she triumphed at the 2021 Australian Women's Amateur in Adelaide.

She is a four-time recipient of the Karrie Webb Scholarship, and won an individual gold medal at the 2018 Youth Olympics in Buenos Aires. She became Australia's second-ever competitor in the Augusta National Women's Amateur.

Kim also played for the Australia National Team, and she won bronze at the 2017 Toyota Junior Golf World Cup in Japan. In 2018, she represented Australia at the Espirito Santo Trophy and Queen Sirikit Cup. She won the Patsy Hankins Trophy with the Asia/Pacific team in 2018.

In 2019, she participated in the Korean National Sports Festival, where she shot a 61, including a 28 on the first 9 holes, to comfortably win the international women's gold.

Kim is a member of Avondale Golf Club and was co-captain of the NSW Women's team which defended their crown at the 2019 Australian Interstate Teams Matches. She was awarded Golf NSW's Female Golfer of the Year in 2019.

Kim spent 7.5 months in the United States during 2021 and won two titles on the Women's All-Pro Tour as an amateur. She finished tied 10th at the Prasco Charity Championship and competed in the U.S. Women's Amateur where she lost to semi-finalist Rachel Heck.

Kim won the TPS Sydney on the ALPG Tour in 2021 and again in 2022 after she turned professional late 2021. She rose to 288th in the Women's World Golf Rankings in March 2022. She gained conditional status for the 2022 Epson Tour at LPGA Q-School.

In April 2023, Kim won her first LPGA title winning the Lotte Championship at Hoakalei Country Club. She won on the first playoff hole, beating Yu Liu and Sung Yu-jin with a birdie after both competitors ended up in bunkers on their second shots.

Kim won the 2025 Evian Championship in a playoff with Atthaya Thitikul. It was Kim's first victory in a major.

== Amateur wins ==
- 2016 Greg Norman Junior Masters
- 2017 Victorian Junior Masters, Australian Girls' Amateur, South Australia Women's Amateur, Jack Newton International Junior Classic, Tasmanian Women's Amateur
- 2018 Youth Olympic Games – individual, Federal Women's Amateur Open Championship, Dunes Medal, ANNIKA Invitational Australasia
- 2019 Victorian Women's Amateur Championship
- 2020 NSW Women's Amateur, The Avondale Amateur
- 2021 NSW Women's Amateur, Australian Women's Amateur

== Professional wins (7) ==
=== LPGA Tour wins (2) ===
Legend
Major championships (1)
Other LPGA Tour (1)

No.	Date	Tournament	Winning score	To par	Margin of victory	Runners-up	Winner's share ($)
1	15 Apr 2023	Lotte Championship	71-67-70-68=276	−12	Playoff	(China) Yu Liu (South Korea) Sung Yu-jin	300,000
2	13 Jul 2025	Amundi Evian Championship^{[1]}	65-68-70-67=270	−14	Playoff	(Thailand) Jeeno Thitikul	1,200,000

^{1} Co-sanctioned by the Ladies European Tour.

LPGA Tour playoff record (2–1)

No.	Year	Tournament	Opponents	Result
1	2023	Lotte Championship	(China) Yu Liu (South Korea) Sung Yu-jin	Won with birdie on first extra hole
2	2024	Meijer LPGA Classic	(United States) Lilia Vu (United States) Lexi Thompson	Vu won with a birdie on third extra hole
3	2025	Amundi Evian Championship	(Thailand) Jeeno Thitikul	Won with an eagle on the second extra hole

=== ALPG Tour wins (2) ===
No.	Date	Tournament	Winning score	To par	Margin of victory	Runner(s)-up
1	7 Mar 2021	TPS Sydney (as an amateur)	67-70=137	−5	2 strokes	(Australia) Breanna Gill (Australia) Su-Hyun Oh
2	6 Mar 2022	TPS Sydney	70-67-65=202	−11	1 stroke	(Australia) Cassie Porter

=== Epson Tour wins (1) ===
- 2022 IOA Golf Classic

=== Women's All-Pro Tour wins (2) ===
- 2021 Oscar Williams Classic, Texarkana Children's Charities Open (as an amateur)

== Major championships ==
=== Wins (1) ===
Year	Championship	54 holes	Winning score	Margin	Runner-up
2025	Evian Championship	1 stroke deficit	−14 (65-68-70-67=270)	Playoff	(Thailand) Jeeno Thitikul

=== Results timeline ===
Results not in chronological order.

Tournament	2022	2023	2024	2025	2026
Chevron Championship		CUT	CUT	T59	CUT
U.S. Women's Open	T63	T13		CUT	T22
Women's PGA Championship		14	T60	T36	T24
The Evian Championship		CUT	T51	1	CUT
Women's British Open		T36	T37	T67	CUT

Win
Did not play

CUT = missed the half-way cut
T = tied

=== Summary ===
Tournament	Wins	2nd	3rd	Top-5	Top-10	Top-25	Events	Cuts made
Chevron Championship	0	0	0	0	0	0	4	1
U.S. Women's Open	0	0	0	0	0	2	4	3
Women's PGA Championship	0	0	0	0	0	2	4	4
The Evian Championship	1	0	0	1	1	1	4	2
Women's British Open	0	0	0	0	0	0	4	3
Totals	1	0	0	1	1	5	20	13

== LPGA Tour career summary ==
Year	Tournaments played	Cuts made*	Wins	2nd	3rd	Top 10s	Best finish	Earnings ($)	Money list rank	Scoring average	Scoring rank
2018	1	0	0	0	0	0	CUT	n/a	n/a	77.00	n/a
2019	1	0	0	0	0	0	CUT	n/a	n/a	75.50	n/a
2020	1	0	0	0	0	0	CUT	n/a	n/a	74.00	n/a
2021	Did not play										
2022	1	1	0	0	0	0	T63	n/a	n/a	74.25	n/a
2023	22	16	1	0	0	2	1	959,443	29	70.81	37
2024	28	22	0	1	0	3	T2	805,240	51	71.05	39
2025	22	17	1	0	0	4	1	1,726,200	14	71.24	54
Totals^	72 (2023)	55 (2023)	2	1	0	9	1	3,490,883	144		

^ Official as of 2025 season
*Includes matchplay and other tournaments without a cut.

== World ranking ==
Position in Women's World Golf Rankings at the end of each calendar year.

Year	Ranking	Source
2019	1,228	
2020	961	
2021	646	
2022	181	
2023	76	
2024	80	
2025	25	

== Team appearances ==
Amateur

- Toyota Junior Golf World Cup (representing Australia): 2017
- Patsy Hankins Trophy (representing Asia/Pacific): 2018 (winners)
- Espirito Santo Trophy (representing Australia): 2018
- Queen Sirikit Cup (representing Australia): 2018
- Summer Youth Olympics Mixed team event (representing Australia): 2018

Professional

- International Crown (representing Australia): 2025 (winners)
