= Boral (surname) =

Boral is a surname. Notable people with the surname include:

- Ethem Servet Boral (1876–c.1956), Ottoman Turkish army officer
- Raichand Boral (1903–1981), Indian film score composer and musician
- Uğur Boral (born 1982), Turkish footballer

== See also ==
- Baral (surname), a similarly spelled surname
- Boral, an Australian building and construction materials company
