= Khadgajeet Baral =

9th Inspector General of Nepal Police(1928–2021)

Khadgajeet Baral खड्गजीत बराल
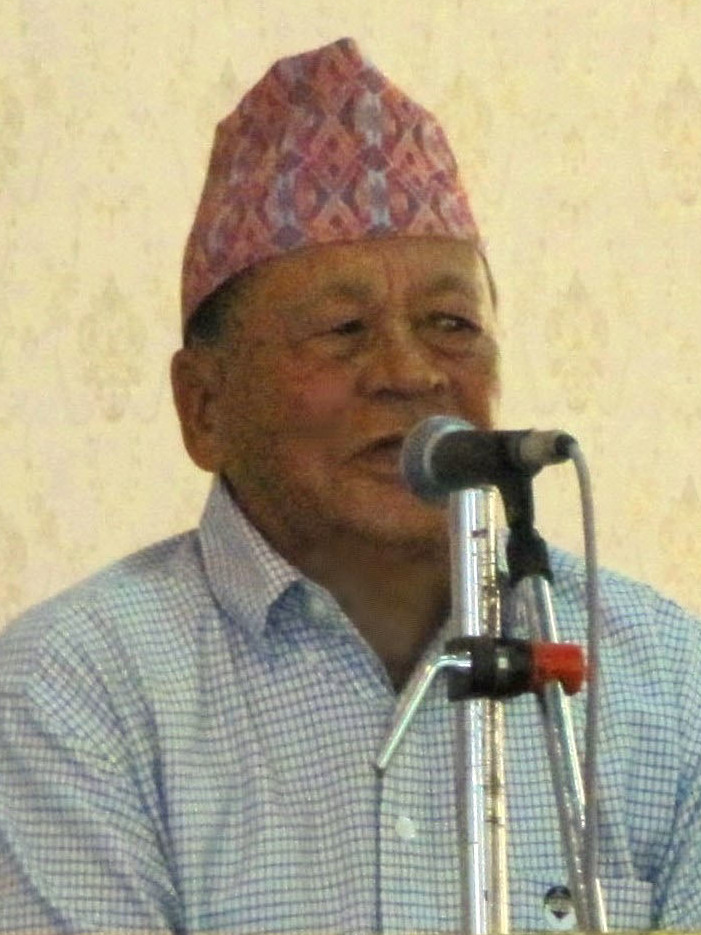
- Former IGP Khadgajeet Baral briefing the press on the book's ("Kasauti ma Nepal Prahari") details during the book release at the Nepal Police Club in August, 2013.

9th Inspector General of Nepal Police
- Preceded by: Rom Bahadur Thapa
- Succeeded by: Durlav Kumar Thapa

Founder President of Nepal Hockey Association
- Preceded by: First
- Succeeded by: Unknown

Vice-President of Nepal Badminton Association
- Preceded by: Unknown
- Succeeded by: Unknown

Ambassador of Nepal to Myanmar
- Prime Minister: Surya Bahadur Thapa
- Preceded by: Saardul Rana
- Succeeded by: Divya Bhatta

Ambassador of Nepal to French Indochina and Indonesia
- Prime Minister: Surya Bahadur Thapa
- Preceded by: Shardul Shumsher JBR
- Succeeded by: Dr. Divya Dev Bhatta

Member of Nepalese Legislature
- Prime Minister: Lokendra Bahadur Chand
- Deputy: Unknown

President of Royal Nepal Golf Club
- Deputy: Unknown
- Preceded by: Pyush Bahadur Amatya
- Succeeded by: Vinode Shumsher Rana

Chief Liaison Officer of the United Nations
- Prime Minister: Girija Prasad Koirala
- Deputy: Unknown

President of Nepal Judo Association
- Preceded by: Unknown
- Succeeded by: Unknown

Personal details
- Born: 17 April 1928 Nawalparasi District, Nepal
- Died: 19 May 2021 (aged 93)
- Citizenship: Nepalese
- Relations: Bahadur Singh Baral (father)
- Children: 2 sons
- Education: Agra University (BA)
- Occupation: Police officer Diplomat; Politician; Social worker
- Awards: Order of Tri Shakti Patta, Class I Order of Gorkha Dakshina Bahu, Class I Life Time Achievement Award

Khadgajeet Baral (Nepali: खड्गजीत बराल) (April 17, 1928 – May 19, 2021) was a Nepalese police officer, diplomat, sports promoter and social worker, who is primarily known for his contributions in modernizing Nepal Police as its 9th Inspector General of Police.

After participating in the 1950 revolution under the Mukti Sena that would lead to the collapse of the 104-year-old Rana rule, Baral enlisted in Nepal Police as an inspector in 1956, gradually ascending to the highest position, Inspector General of Nepal Police (IGP) in 1972.

The first chief to have entered Nepal Police by open competition of Nepal’s Public Service Commission, Baral was also the first post-graduate police officer to attain the position of chief of Nepal Police.

Known as the longest serving chief of Nepal Police, serving for a six-year tenure (1972–78) alongside his predecessor late Rom Bahadur Thapa (1966–72), Baral was one of the youngest persons to be appointed as Nepal Police’s chief at the age of 44 years post Police Act’s (1955) enactment.

After retiring from police service in 1978, Baral served as the residential ambassador of Nepal to the then Burma (present Myanmar) from 1980 to 1985. At the same time, he also served as the non-residential (accredited) Ambassador of Nepal to Malaysia, Indonesia, and the French Indochina (Vietnam, Laos and Cambodia) and later as a Member of Nepal’s unicameral parliament. Baral also later served as a chief liaison officer and international polling supervision officer of the UNTAC (United Nations Transitional Authority in Cambodia) from 1992-1993.

Acclaimed as the pioneer that formed the foundations for the modern Nepal Police organization by both former and incumbent members of the organization, he is also regarded as the organization’s guardian. It was in his tenure as police chief that basic necessities such as provisions of free rations, independent buildings and free uniforms were made accessible to all personnel of Nepal Police.

Other significant reforms in his tenure as the police chief include the establishment and construction of border security police posts (Sima Prahari Chauki) and security police district offices (also for border security) along the Nepal-India border for the first time.

Additionally, Nepal’s police officers received training in India’s Border Security Force (BSF) during Baral’s IGP tenure. It was the first time that Nepal Police’s personnel had received border-security related training.

In his tenure as police chief, Nepal Police implemented numerous other innovations such as the establishments of:
· Engineering section (1974),
· Dog section (1975),
· Police flying squad (1975),
· Nepal Police Mountaineering and Adventure Foundation (NPMAF) (1976) and
· Mounted police (1977), etc.

‘Nepal ko Kutnitik Abhyas: Rajdutharuko Anubhaw’ (Nepal’s Diplomatic Practice: Experiences of Ambassador), published by the Institute of Foreign Affairs (IFA) under Nepal’s Ministry of Foreign Affairs, includes Baral's memoir during his tenure as Ambassador to Myanmar. It details the introduction of many reforms, such as-
· Provisions of citizenships NRCs (National Registration Certificates) to thousands of Nepalis residing in Myanmar,
· Construction of Pashupatinath Temple in Mamyo (present Pwin Oo Lwyin)
· Construction of Maha Wijaya Zedi Pagoda in Rangoon (present Yangon),
· Commencing the tradition of celebrating Bhanu Jayanti (Pioneer Poet Bhanu Bhakta Acharya’s birthday) in Myanmar,
· Publication of Nepali magazine ‘Irrawaddy’, a tri-monthly and the first Nepali publication in Myanmar.

Upon Baral’s passing on May 19, 2021, Nepal Police Headquarters publicly stated that for his incomparable contributions to the Nepal Police’s growth and development, he was established as the organization’s Yug Purush (Man of the Era) and expressed sorrow over the loss of its guardian.

== Early Life and activism (1928-1956) ==
Khadgajeet Baral was born to captain Bahadur Singh Baral and Saraswati Baral in then Palpa (present Nawalpur) district, Nepal on April 17, 1928.

Prior to his police career, he was an active member of the Mukti Sena, an armed resistance group formed by Nepali Congress to overthrow the autocratic Rana regime. Baral, along with around 150 men led by guerilla combatant Khadga Bahadur Gurung, unsuccessfully invaded the office of Bhairahawa’s Bada Hakim.

Following the tripartite Delhi agreement of 1951, he and other freedom fighters of the Bhairahawa Morcha opposed the terms of appointing Mohan SJB Rana as Nepal’s prime minister. As a result, they were ambushed and briefly held captive by the Indian Army. Later, they were imprisoned for three months by the then government of Nepal.

Baral later obtained a bachelor’s degree (BA) from Agra University in 1952 and a master’s degree (MA) in political science in 1955 from another Indian university.

== Early career in Nepal Police (1956-1972) ==
In 1956, Baral joined the Nepal Police in 1956 as part of the first batch of academically qualified (candidates with a bachelor’s degree) inspectors selected through open competition of Nepal’s Public Service Commission. Additionally, he was also the first person with a graduate degree (master’s degree) to enlist in the force.

As a police officer, Baral was looked upon with apprehension by many officials since the day of his entry into service. This was because at the time, Nepali policemen were mostly uneducated and seldom held a degree. So, at the time, the Nepali society was of the view that there was no place for highly educated men in their police force.

Baral briefly served as the security officer to the first Indian Prime Minister, Jawaharlal Nehru, when Nehru visited Nepal from 11–14 June 1959.

As a SP, Baral served as the commandant of the Central Police Training Center (present National Police Academy) in Maharajgunj from 1965 to 1968. He was a hands-on instructor, teaching subjects such as international police organization (Interpol), general knowledge, narcotics control, anti-counterfeiting currency, and anti-hijacking measures.

A key innovation during his time as commandant was the introduction of unarmed combat training (martial arts) into the police curriculum for self-defense in 1967. Under this, trainees were taught how to defend themselves and how to counter-attack and neutralize their assailants.

Circa 1971, whilst serving as the head of the central region DIG office in Kathmandu, his office introduced ‘head-constable training’, which included improved methods of patrolling, surveillance of bailees and collection of intel. Additionally, the public was also invited to learn regarding protection methods against fires and criminals.

== Tenure as Inspector General of Nepal Police (IGP) (1972-1978) ==
In 1972, after serving in Nepal Police for nearly 16 years, Baral was appointed as the Inspector General of Nepal Police (IGP) at the age of 44, making him one of the youngest police chiefs since the enactment of the 1955 Police Act (2012).

He was also the first chief to have joined the organization by the Public Service Commission’s open competition as well as the ‘first post-graduate police officer’ to ascend to the position.

The average tenure of Nepal Police’s chief (IGP) is four years. Baral and his predecessor, late Rom Bahadur Thapa, are the only ones to have served as chiefs for a period of six years, having had two years extended at the end of their four-year tenures.

His first act as the police chief was introducing the culture of organizing formal events to welcome and to bid farewell to the incoming and outgoing police chiefs, respectively.

In Baral's tenure in 1973, Nepal Police changed the minimum educational requirement to openly compete for the position of ASI (Assistant Sub-Inspector) from matriculation (grade 10) to intermediate level (grade 12).

=== Professionalization through specialized training ===
Baral initiated a comprehensive strategy to enhance the skills of police personnel by sending them to prestigious international institutions:

· Narcotics control: In 1972, Baral nominated Nepal police’s then acting DSP (later DIG) late Rudra Bdr. Pandey, to receive specialized training for the first time at the Bureau of Narcotics and Dangerous Drugs (BNDD), the predecessor to the Drug Enforcement Administration (DEA) in the US

· Forensics and investigation: Under Baral’s nomination, Nepal Police’s officers like future SP duo Hari Bdr. Thapa and Kamal Khadka along with two others were sent to the Central Bureau of Investigation (CBI) in Calcutta, India, to be trained in fingerprint and handwriting analysis circa 1976.
Additionally, under Baral's leadership, police personnel were sent to the UK for specialized courses in forensics (fingerprinting, ballistics), counterintelligence, photography and communications.

· Technical skills: Baral arranged for training in wireless communications in India to improve the existing effective internal information network (the ‘Aakash wani’ branch) and brought in a Japanese instructor to streamline the motor transport management branch.

=== Personnel Welfare and Infrastructure (Food, shelter and clothing) ===
Baral's leadership addressed the core needs of police personnel, often summarized as food, shelter, and clothing.

Food: On 31 August 1973, the provision of free government rations was made possible for all police personnel after scuffling with the then government for more than a year.

Shelter: In 1974, an ‘engineering section’ (now the Directorate of Physical Infrastructure) was established in Nepal Police, and the position of a DSP was created to serve as the section’s in-charge. Similarly, positions for a few over-shares were also created. Senior engineer Bharat Raj Sharma was appointed as Nepal Police’s first engineer and head of its engineering section to oversee the systematic development of police infrastructure.

Prior to Baral’s appointment as police chief, police personnel were compelled to work in dilapidated pati-pauwa like buildings and inhabit commoners’ houses as tenants. As such, Nepali citizens felt reluctant in visiting police offices. Then IGP Baral conceived construction of standardized police buildings in the traditional single-gajur pagoda style with the objective of making Nepal Police people-friendly and making the buildings ‘aesthetically attractive’ and ‘psychologically acceptable’ to the then ‘highly pious’ Nepali public.

Under Baral’s directive and the engineering section’s design, Nepal Police launched a nationwide campaign of constructing outposts, barracks and other police buildings. This initiative, at a time of limited government funding and state resources, was often funded with local community support, in the form of cash and land, aimed to create more accessible and respectable public spaces. Consequently, the Nepali commoners began to view newly constructed police buildings in the form of ‘justice temples'.

Subsequently, police morale was boosted, aiding to serve the community in a more efficient capacity. The single gajur pagoda architecture was later emulated by other government offices.

Clothing: In the past, police personnel had to manage their uniform costs on their own personal expenses. In Baral’s tenure in 1976, for the first time, the government began allocating a budget for providing free, standardized uniforms for all police personnel.

=== Legal and Institutional Reforms ===
Baral envisioned and contributed to the legislations and enactments of: The Immigration Act to strengthen the security system in context to Nepal’s immigration, the Evidence Act (1974) to modernize crime investigation and the Narcotics Drug (Control) Act (1976) to systematize prosecutions in relation to narcotics crimes.

Following Baral’s participation in an Interpol general assembly as the police chief, he established contact with the West German government. This resulted in aiding him to facilitate the visit of a renowned German legal expert to Nepal, whose assistance was crucial in drafting and enacting the Narcotic Drug Control Act, 2033 (1976). This was the first legislation of its kind in South Asia and remains the basis for Nepal's current narcotics laws.

=== Immigration ===
In Baral’s IGP tenure, with the intention of organizing, refining, and monitoring immigration-related activities, positions were sanctioned in 1973 to operate under the control of the Nepal Police. From 1974 to 1990, the Nepal Police provided continuous service in this sector.

According to a blog article by former SSP Indra Neupane, during Baral’s tenure, questions were indeed raised regarding whether immigration matters should be handled by the Home Ministry. However, Neupane claims that who could’ve countered Baral’s argument that- ‘When immigration services are operated by the police organization, national security would remain uncompromised, and the personal safety and surveillance of foreigners entering Nepal would be guaranteed?’

During IGP Baral's tenure, Nepal Police was responsible for overseeing immigration, airport security, and the issuance of driving licenses in Nepal.

=== Border Security ===
In 2021, former Additional Inspector General (AIG) of the Armed Police Force (APF) Nepal Mr. Rabi Raj Thapa opined that one of the most important measures implemented during then IGP Baral’s administration was the conception and initiation of Nepal’s first formal border security program.

Under Baral’s nomination, numerous officers of Nepal Police were sent to India to receive specialized advanced paramilitary and border security training in field-craft, map-reading, and commando and company commander tactics, etc. by India's Border Security Force’s (BSF) academies for the first time.

Key police officers that were sent to receive training in India's Border Security Force (BSF) in Baral’s tenure, include:
· Future DIG of Nepal Police and chiefs of NID (National Investigation Department) and Special Police Govinda Karma Thapa
· Future IGP trio late Hem Bahadur Singh, Achyut Krishna Kharel and Dhruba Bahadur Pradhan (later MP and law minister)
· Future AIG duo late Dhalman Thapa and Tirtha Kumar Pradhan
· Future AIG (APF) Rabi Raj Thapa
· Future DIG Rupal SJB Rana
· Future SP Sher Bahadur Karki
· Future DSP trio Naradhwaj Thapa, Shree Krishna Thapa and Kamal Bhandari

Furthermore, a ‘train the trainer’ model was implemented in his tenure to disseminate these skills, i.e., several such trained police officers were assigned to successively train other police staff at National Police Academy, Maharajgunj. Rabi Raj Thapa was one of such officers in this model to have imparted training to other personnel.

Baral also conceived and began implementing a plan to establish numerous border security police posts (Sima prahari chauki) and security police district offices (Surakshya Prahari Jilla Karyalaya) along both the Nepal-India border for the first time, sanctioning positions (darbandis) for them within Nepal Police. The inspector positions of 1976 were created for this very reason.

Additional border security related police offices would be established at the Nepal-China frontiers as well.

Many of the officers who had received BSF training would then be deployed in the above mentioned offices.
Furthermore, standardized pagoda style buildings were built for these offices, equipping them with necessary weapons and paraphernalia. Most of the buildings of such established offices were inaugurated by Baral himself in his tenure.

=== Establishment of specialized units ===
In Baral's IGP tenure, Nepal Police established numerous specialized units that form the backbone of modern policing in Nepal, including:

· Police flying squad: In 1975, an emergency response unit named the ‘Police Flying Squad’ with Volkswagen vans was launched in the City Police Office at Bhrikuti-mandap to provide emergency security service in the Kathmandu Valley. This is considered to be the precursor to the modern Community Response Vehicle (CRV) patrols.

· Dog section: In 1975, a dog section (present Nepal Police K-9 Division), was established to be led by a sub-inspector with positions of 10 police personnel at Nepal Police Headquarters to aid in criminal investigations.

· Mounted police: Circa 1973, horse riding training commenced for police personnel. A year later, mounted police were introduced for traffic management by importing horses from India.
On April 13, 1977, mounted police was formally established within the then Central Traffic Police Office (present Kathmandu Valley Traffic Police Office) for traffic and crowd control in Kathmandu.

· Pokhara DIGP office: Circa 1975, a DIGP office was established in Pokhara. Its currently in operation as the Gandaki Province Police Office.

· West-Regional Police Training Center: West-Regional Police Training Center was established at Butwal in 1977. Its currently in operation as the Lumbini Province Police Training Center.

· Central-Regional Police Training Center: Central-Regional Police Training Center was established at Ranibari in 1974. It was later relocated and is currently in operation as the Bagmati Province Police Training Center, Dudhauli, Sindhuli.

· Police Museum: A police museum was established in 1977.

=== Healthcare ===
Baral envisioned a dedicated hospital for police personnel and their immediate families.

To begin this process, in 1976, a DSP position for a medical doctor was approved along with 11 other technical staff positions.
With Baral’s endeavor, Dr. Premlal Shrestha was permanently appointed Nepal Police’s DSP in 1977. Shrestha would later serve as Nepal Police Hospital’s first medical director.
From 1976, nursing-orderlies were selected from among police personnel and then trained at Tri-Chandra Military Hospital, followed by their permanent appointments as the medical staff of Nepal Police.

The current site of Nepal Police Hospital was purchased by the then government of Nepal for Nepal Police in Baral’s IGP term.

In early 1974, as Nepal’s first police chief to officially visit India, Baral convinced the Indian government to aid in constructing a 25 bedded hospital for Nepal Police. In 1977, he collaborated with the Government of India to propose a project worth Rs. three crores aimed at establishing a 50-bed hospital for the Nepal Police. Under the plan, Nepal Police were to provide the land and manpower, while the Indian government would cover all construction costs, supply medical equipment, and extend technical and supervisory support. During Baral’s tenure, the Indian side released the first installment for the project.

=== Nepal Police School ===
Baral envisioned a dedicated school for the children of lower ranking police personnel to ensure they had access to quality education.

Whilst serving as the in-charge of the Central Region DIGP office, Baral directed the then Sorakhutte line-in-charge Ashok Singh (later DIGP) to search for a plot of land suitable for the construction of Nepal Police School. Even though Singh did as instructed, the then government’s rebuff to the budget for the land purchase and construction led to a stalemate in the project. Though this prevented its immediate establishment, Baral’s advocacy laid the essential groundwork for the institution that exists today.

=== Modernization of the Nepal Police Musical School and Police Reunion Program ===
Till 1972, the then Nepal Police Band (present Nepal Police Musical School) was not adequately experienced, lacked formal musical training and essential musical knowledge. Thus, its performances lacked uniformity and were unimpressive.

==== Captain Hasta Bahadur Thapa's deployment in Kathmandu and introduction of pipe band ====
In early 1973, as per an agreement between then IGP Baral and major general Bernie Bernad of the British Gurkha Army, captain Hasta Bahadur Thapa, who had been serving as an assistant music director to the British Gurkhas, was temporarily assigned to instruct the Nepal Police Band in Kathmandu. This led to the introduction of a pipe band within the police band.

==== Inclusivity and Beating the Retreat ====
Historically, due to deep-rooted caste-based discrimination in Nepal, playing musical instruments in military and police bands was socially stigmatized as an occupation reserved exclusively for the Dalit community. Consequently, non-Dalits resisted joining these musical groups. In 1973, during the tenure of IGP Baral, a significant reform was initiated to desegregate the Nepal Police Band. Baral directed the musical training of approximately 200 police constables—including non-Dalits—at the Central Region Police Training Center (then located at Prachanda Bhawan, Maharajgunj). This initiative successfully integrated non-Dalits into the ensemble for the first time, breaking traditional caste barriers and establishing social inclusivity within Nepal's security forces' musical bands.

Under Baral’s conception, Thapa’s training and the introduction of new musical equipment from the UK, the hosting of the prestigious annual ‘Beating the Retreat’ ceremony commenced on November 8, 1973.

==== Police Reunion Program ====
In 1973, Baral personally secured permission from then King Birendra to host the ‘Police Reunion Program’ annually on the same day the beating the retreat ceremony would be held, a custom that has continued to foster solidarity and brotherhood among incumbent and former police personnel. This was significant in the Panchayat era when organizations and associations were banned. Furthermore, it would later be known to have laid the initial groundwork for the formation of the Nepal Retired Police Organization post democracy in 1990.

==== Hasta Bahadur Thapa's permanent appointment in Nepal Police ====
Later, Thapa’s stint in Nepal ended and he formally retired from the British Army. Despite himself and then IGP Baral wanting him to join Nepal Police on a permanent position, he had exceeded the age for enlistment. In the aftermath, Baral, intending for Thapa’s permanent recruitment in Nepal Police, directly appealed to King Birendra, citing his expertise was indispensable for the police band’s long-term development. After Baral convinced the king to utilize Hukum Pramangi (Hu.Pra.), i.e., a royal veto power that allowed him to supersede even the constitution itself, Thapa was appointed as an inspector of Nepal Police on April 16, 1977. This was known to have been one of the last such appointments, as Baral himself later convinced the King to end the practice to preserve professionalism and morale within the force.

=== Cultural programs and inclusivity ===
Baral initiated the tradition of organizing cultural programs that included both police and civilian artists, often using satire to foster internal reflection and connect with the public.

Since the inception of the positions of Aide-de-camps (ADCs) from Nepal Police for the then royal palace, candidates from the Brahmin and Newari ethnic communities were not included for selection of this position. In then IGP Baral’s tenure, inspector Tirtha Kumar Pradhan (later AIG of Nepal Police) from the Newari community was given appointment of ADC to the royal family after Pradhan’s nomination by Baral.

=== Special buildings within Nepal Police HQ's premises ===
· Armed-Police Gana No. 1 barracks building: A strong 3 floored pagoda style building in L-shape was constructed to house the garrison of police personnel within Nepal Police HQ, Naxal and inaugurated by then IGP Baral at the end of his tenure in 1978.

· Central store building: A separate building was constructed within the premises of NPHQ, Naxal to serve as the central store building.

· Forensic science laboratory building: A separate building for a modern forensics science lab was constructed and inaugurated by then IGP Baral within the Nepal Police Headquarters in 1978, significantly boosting the force's crime investigation capabilities.

=== Trainings ===
Baral’s key training experiences included:
· India: Indian Police Service (IPS) training at the Central Police Training College, Mt. Abu in 1956-57.
· United Kingdom: Senior detective training at the Cardiff Police School in Wales in 1966-67 and another training at the West Riding Constabulary in Wakefield in 1964-65.
· Japan: Training at the Tokyo Imperial Police College in 1966.
· United States: Training with the Federal Bureau of Investigation (FBI) in 1974.

== Ambassadorship (1980-1985) ==
Following his formal retirement from law enforcement in 1978, Baral served as Nepal's residential ambassador to Burma (now Myanmar) from 1980 to 1985. During this period, he concurrently served as the non-residential ambassador to Indonesia, Singapore, Laos, Cambodia, Vietnam, and Malaysia. His tenure in Myanmar is noted for significant diplomatic achievements regarding the status of the Nepali diaspora and bilateral relations.

=== Citizenship and rights for the diaspora ===
Upon his arrival in Burma in 1980, Baral addressed the precarious legal status of the Nepali-origin population, estimated at the time to be around 350,000. Under the strict policies of the then Burmese President General Ne Win's government, many ethnic Nepalis were classified as foreigners holding only Foreigner Registration Certificates (FRC), which restricted their access to higher education in medicine and engineering, government employment, registration of companies and freedom of movement. However, they had access to abundant plots of land and numerous livestock.

Baral engaged in persistent negotiations with the Burmese government, eventually securing an agreement that allowed thousands of ethnic Nepalis to obtain National Registration Certificates (NRC), thereby granting them full citizenship and civil rights.

=== Cultural and religious diplomacy ===
To preserve Nepali culture amidst the Burmese government's assimilationist ‘one country, one language, one dress’ policy, Baral utilized diplomatic privileges to import Nepali language textbooks for the community. At a time when organizations were banned in Myanmar, he successfully negotiated the registration of the ‘All Burma Deshiya Hindu Gorkha Association' for the Nepali origin community, paving the way for the operation of schools to facilitate the instruction of the Nepali language. Baral's tenure also facilitated the publication of Irrawaddy, the first Nepali-language quarterly magazine in the region.

Baral also focused on ‘architectural diplomacy’. He commissioned Nepali artisans to construct a Pashupatinath temple in Pyin Oo Lwin (formerly Maymyo), which was inaugurated in 1984.

Additionally, following a state visit by King Birendra in March, 1980, Baral facilitated the construction of the Maha Wijaya Zedi Pagoda in Yangon by the joint collaboration of Burmese craftsmen and Nepali craftsmen brought from Bungmati of Lalitpur, Nepal. The objective of building this pagoda was to house relics from Lumbini, additionally ensuring the interior was adorned with woodcarvings pertaining to the life of the Buddha.

=== Bilateral relations ===
During his term, Baral helped secure Burma's formal support for Nepal's ‘Zone of Peace’ proposal, making it the third nation to do so. His tenure also oversaw the successful establishment of the first direct air link between the two nations by extending Royal Nepal Airlines' Kathmandu-Bangkok route to Yangon. Furthermore, he instituted mandatory visa regulations for Burmese pilgrims visiting Lumbini to reinforce the historical fact of the Buddha's birth in Nepal.

== Sports promotion ==
=== Football ===
Khadgajeet Baral is credited with mainstreaming police football. As an acting DIG, he conceived the ‘IGP Shield Football Tournament,’ in 1968, an inter-zonal football competition that cultivated talent. His most significant contribution was securing approval from the royal palace for the Mahendra Police Club to compete against civilian football clubs. This decision brought the team into the national spotlight, and it has eventually become the renowned Nepal Police Club.

==== Recruitment-selection policy and athlete incentives ====
While serving in Nepal Police, Baral implemented a transformative recruitment-selection policy that prioritized national-level athletes for officer-level positions, including Inspector, Sub-Inspector (SI), and Assistant Sub-Inspector (ASI). By providing permanent appointments to skilled sportspersons, the Nepal Police became a hub for athletic talent, significantly elevating the standard of football and other sports across the country.

To incentivize performance, Baral introduced a system of immediate rewards. During national-level tournaments, police players who scored goals were frequently rewarded with a cash prize of Rs. 500 or, in some instances, merit-based promotions.

==== Notable police footballers ====
The policy of permanent appointments brought many legendary figures into the Nepal Police, many of whom later held high-ranking positions. Prominent football players recruited during this era include:
· Achyut Krishna Kharel (Former IGP)
· Rupal SJB Rana (Former DIG)
· Baburam Pun (Former SSP)
· Late Rupak Raj Sharma (Former SP)
· Suresh Panthi, and Dhirendra Pradhan, Lok Bdr. Shahi and Ashok KC (Former Inspectors)

==== FIFA training for police footballers ====
Then IGP Baral arranged for players to receive international training, leading to members obtaining FIFA coaching licenses and becoming FIFA-certified referees. For example- future SSP Baburam Pun received a FIFA coaching license after receiving training from the FIFA training school in Tehran, Iran in 1973. Future SP late Rupak Raj Sharma also became a FIFA referee.

==== National dominance in football ====
During the tenure of IGP Baral, the Mahendra Police Club emerged as the most successful sports club in the country, winning the highest number of national trophies and shields. A landmark year was 1977-78 AD (2034 BS), when the Nepal Police secured first-place finishes in nearly every major tournament in Nepal, including:
· Kathmandu: Shree 5 Tribhuvan Challenge Shield, Shree 5 Tribhuvan Gold Cup, and the King’s Birthday Cup (commemorating King Birendra)
· Biratnagar: Shree 5 Mahendra Gold Cup
· Regional Titles: The Rolling Cup Dhulabari (Jhapa), the Tilottama Gold Cup (Butwal), and the Bheri Shield

During this era, the dominance of the Nepal Police was not limited to football but extended across almost all national-level sporting disciplines.

==== International victories and police diplomacy ====
In 1976 (2033 BS), the Nepal Police achieved historic international success by winning the Gorkha Brigade Cup in Darjeeling and the Sanjay Gandhi Memorial Football Tournament in New Delhi. This marked the first time in the history of Nepalese sports that a national team won titles in competitions organized in India.

Baral also utilized sports as a form of 'police diplomacy', organizing friendly matches between the Nepal Police and various Indian security agencies, including the Bihar Police and the Border Security Force (BSF). These interactions significantly strengthened the bilateral relations and mutual cooperation between the security forces of both nations.

==== Legacy and national impact ====
Under the leadership of then IGP Baral, football was utilized as a strategic tool to bridge the gap between Nepal Police and the general public. This initiative fostered harmonious community relations and eventually led to the integration of police and civilian athletes into various national teams. Furthermore, the encouragement provided by the Nepal Police allowed its athletes to excel in international arenas, enhancing Nepal's national prestige. During Baral's tenure as IGP, the department’s investment in sports was so significant that several police officers served as captains of Nepal’s national football team. Numerous police footballers were awarded with the nationwide ‘best player’ titles.

Former Vice-President of Nepal Badminton Association (NBA), Khadgajeet Baral, after being felicitated with the "Nepal Badminton Samman 2069" on the auspicious occasion of the 36th National Badminton Competition 2069 by NBA in 2013 for his contributions to the development of Badminton in Nepal during his tenure as vice-president.

=== Badminton ===
Baral also served as the vice-president of the Nepal Badminton Association in 1979 after he retired from law enforcement.

=== Judo ===
Khadgajeet Baral is credited with introducing judo in Nepal and Nepal Police in circa 1968-69 AD (2026 BS).

His interest in the martial art began in 1966 while undergoing training in Japan, where he first observed the sport. Baral persuaded the Japanese Police Chief, Aaraiya, to support the Nepal Police in establishing a Judo program. As a result of this diplomatic initiative, Japan sent a 6th Dan Judo Master, Ichizu Sakairi, to Nepal, along with the necessary coaching equipment and paraphernalia.

During Baral’s tenure as the IGP, Baral institutionalized the sport by sending numerous police personnel to Japan for advanced training. He also invited several prominent Japanese masters, such as Hashimoto, to provide localized training within Nepal, laying the foundation for the development of Judo as both a tactical skill for law enforcement and a competitive sport in the country.

Baral later served as the president of NJA, i.e., the Nepal Judo Association (present Nepal Judo Federation) consecutively for six years. During his tenure, in 1995, Nepal bagged 3 gold, 3 silver and 5 bronze medals at the 7th South Asian Games held in Madras, India.

=== Hockey ===
Khadgajeet Baral is regarded as the pioneer of field hockey in Nepal, serving as the founding president of the All Nepal Hockey Association for 8 years.

He played a pivotal role in expanding the sport of field hockey throughout Nepal. Even prior to his formal presidency, Baral was instrumental in organizing numerous matches at Tundikhel, Kathmandu, helping in popularizing the sport among the public. During his tenure as president, he institutionalized the sport by hosting matches at the then Central Police Training Centre (present National Police Academy) in Maharajgunj, Kathmandu.

To elevate the technical standards of the game in Nepal, Baral invited seasoned coaches from Pakistan, including Murtaza and Saiyad Ikbal, to train local athletes. His efforts are credited with producing the first generation of proficient hockey players in the country.

=== Mountaineering ===
==== Establishment of Nepal Police Mountaineering and Adventure Foundation (NPMAF) ====
The Nepal Police Mountaineering and Adventure Foundation (NPMAF) was envisioned in 1973 (2030 BS) by the then Inspector General of Police (IGP), the late Khadgajeet Baral. The foundation was conceptualized with the primary objectives of developing a 'northern centric vision' in a southern centric vision nation, providing security to the residents of the northern territories of Nepal, managing operations along Nepal's northern borders, developing skilled manpower for high-altitude tasks, and promoting Nepal and the Nepal Police globally through mountaineering. Additionally, it aimed to contribute to the conservation and promotion of the country's tourism sector.

Following the NPMAF's initial conception, under then IGP Baral’s guidance, NPMAF was formally established at the Nepal Police HQ on July 8, 1976.

==== Tukuche Expedition (1976) and virgin conquests ====
NPMAF organized the first successful ascent of a mountain, i.e., Mt. Tukuche of an altitude of 6,920m at Mustang district by an all-Nepali team in 1976. This achievement fundamentally challenged and changed the prevailing international perception of Nepali climbers as being merely porters and guides for foreign teams. The monetary expenses for this expedition were solely managed by Nepal Police. This dream was made possible by providing training to selected members of the Tukuche expedition team at Tokha, Kathmandu, Nepal Police HQ and HMI (Himalayan Mountaineering Institute) in Darjeeling, India. In addition, multiple skilled climbers from the Sherpa community were also recruited in Nepal Police prior to the Tukuche expedition.

Eventually, a joint expedition, consisting of members of the NPMAF’s and Japan Workers’ Alpine Federation Club, conquered Mt. Pabil (7,104m) in 1978, whose plan was conceptualized in Baral’s tenure. It was a virgin peak prior to this ascent. Numerous other successful virgin conquests in collaboration with other Japanese mountaineering teams also followed thereafter.

==== Legacy in Mountaineering ====
Even after Baral formally retired from the police force, the NPMAF went on to conquer numerous peaks in Nepal, few of them being virgins, with the latter via collaboration with foreign teams.

Baral's ultimate dream of seeing an all-police team summit Mt. Everest was partially realized 47 years later, when SSI (senior sub-inspector) Purushottam Nepali reached the top of the world on May 16, 2023.

== Social service ==
Late Khadgajeet Baral was a founder member of the Rotary Club of Pashupati, Kathmandu and served as its 4th president from 2001 to 2002.

In the past, Rotary District 3292 of Nepal did not exist and the rotary clubs of Nepal had to function under the Rotary District 3290 based in Calcutta, India. According to former founder member and the 5th president of Rotary Club of Pashupati, Kathmandu Mr. Mohan Bdr. Kayastha, during this period, Baral maintained close and cordial relations with the presidents of the Rotary Clubs within the Bengali community.
Despite the Indian Rotarians wanting Nepal's Rotary district to remain under their control, Baral played a decisive role in the division of Rotary District 3290 and the creation of a separate Rotary District 3292 for Nepal.

According to the founder president of Rotary Club of Pashupati, Kathmandu Mr. Ganesh Bahadur Thapa, since the club's inception in 1998, Baral contributed to its charter and progressive development. The club's foundational years were undeniably challenging. These early hurdles included securing a respectable number of members, encouraging regular attendance at club meetings, arranging a suitable venue for gatherings and establishing sufficient revenue sources to cover the venue's rent. Baral was known to have provided continuous guidance and comprehensive support in overcoming all of these challenges.

While involved with the Rotary Club of Pashupati, Kathmandu, Baral introduced numerous innovative initiatives, which included:
· Providing white canes to assist the visually impaired.
· Providing financial aid to cleft lipped patients along with those with other facial deformities and congenital dental or lingual issues.
· Distributing of food and clothing to the disabled.
· Collecting used, high-quality clothing from Rotarians which would then be thoroughly cleaned and distributed to the underprivileged people suffering from the cold. This initiative proved so effective that successive presidents continued it during their respective tenures.
· Conceptualizing schemes to provide scholarships for economically underprivileged yet meritorious students.
· With a keen focus on the health of the elderly and impoverished living in the Pashupatinath temple area during the winter, a solar-powered water heating system was installed on behalf of the Rotary Club of Pashupati Kathmandu. This project successfully provided proper facilities for the helpless to bathe and maintain hygiene with warm water.
· Organizing health camps in various locations.
· Establishing a memorial fund in honor of an exemplary Rotarian who lost his life in a vehicular accident.
· Distribution of sports equipment to schools.

According to Mr. Kayastha, one of Baral's primary initiatives during his presidency at the Rotary Club of Pashupati, Kathmandu, was supporting cancer treatment. Circa 2002, through then president Baral's relentless efforts, the process of securing financial assistance via a 'matching grant' from Rotary International was initiated. Consequently, during his tenure as president, the procurement of state-of-the-art cancer diagnostic equipment worth approximately 1.5 to 2 million NPR for the Bhaktapur Cancer Hospital commenced. This process was continued in Kayastha's subsequent presidential term, ultimately receiving final approval from Rotary International and reaching completion.

== Personal life ==
Khadgajeet Baral secured the first position with 15 points in the super senior category of the McDowell’s Signature Swig & Swing tournament held at the Royal Nepal Golf Club (RNGC).

He also won the octogenarian section title with 7 points of the Myanmar Ambassador’s Cup golf tournament held at the RNGC on October 15, 2011.
