= Nepal Police Flying Squad =

Nepal Police Flying Squad Nepal Ghumti Prahari

Agency overview
- Formed: 1975 A.D.
- Employees: 12

Jurisdictional structure
- Operations jurisdiction: Nepal, Nepal
- Legal jurisdiction: Kathmandu, Lalitpur and Bhaktapur districts
- Governing body: Government of Nepal
- General nature: Local civilian police

Operational structure
- Headquarters: Nepal Police Club, Kathmandu
- Agency executives: IGP Khadgajeet Baral, Inspector General of Police; Ambika Chhetri (Deceased)
- Parent agency: Nepal Police

Facilities
- Vans: 4

Nepal Police Flying Squad was an elite squad of Nepal Police, consisting of about a dozen well trained police officers, selected by the then IGP Khadgajeet Baral himself for the prevention of criminal activities in the Kathmandu Valley.

Nepal Police Flying Squad consisted of 12 elite efficient police officers to augment police response with quick reaction mobile team to attend major incidents in the Kathmandu Valley.
