= Cho Jeong-min =

South Korean professional golfer (born 1994)

Personal information
- Nationality: South Korea
- Born: 26 November 1994 (age 31) Daegu, South Korea
- Height: 164 cm (5 ft 5 in)

Career
- Sport: Golf
- Turned professional: 2012
- Current tour: LPGA of Korea Tour
- Professional wins: 6

Number of wins by tour
- LPGA of Korea Tour: 5
- WPGA Tour of Australasia: 1

Cho Jeong-min (born 26 November 1994) is a South Korean professional golfer. As an amateur, she represented New Zealand as Cecilia Cho, and in 2011 became women's world number one in the World Amateur Golf Ranking. She has won five events on the LPGA of Korea Tour and in 2019 spent 10 weeks in the top 50 of the Women's World Golf Rankings.

== Early life and amateur career ==
Cho was born in Daegu, South Korea, and moved to New Zealand with her parents and her older brother Taeyoung Cho when she was 8 years old. Within a few years, she became one of the top junior golfers in New Zealand. She won the 2009 New Zealand Women's Amateur, beating the even younger Korean New Zealander Lydia Ko in the final.

In 2010, Cho lost in the final of the Australian Women's Amateur to Stacey Keating, but won the Australian Women's Amateur Stroke Play Championship, becoming the youngest to ever accomplish that feat.

On 9 March 2011 Cho briefly ascended to women's world number one in the World Amateur Golf Ranking. Her rivalry with Lydia Ko intensified, and Ko claimed the 2011 Australian Stroke Play title by beating Cho on the second hole of a sudden-death playoff. Ko then also beat Cho into second at the New Zealand Stroke Play Championship. Cho and Ko met in the final of the New Zealand Match Play Championship, where once again, Ko triumphed, beating Cho 4 and 3 in the final despite the fact Cho had won the event the two previous years. This allowed Ko to rise to number one in the amateur rankings, knocking Cho down to number two.

Cho also appeared in some professional events. She made the cut at the New Zealand Women's Open in 2010 and 2011, and finished 35th at the Women's Australian Open and tied fifth at the ANZ RACV Ladies Masters in 2011. She was the top finisher of Korean heritage in that year's field.

She ended 2011 third in the world amateur rankings, missing out on the Mark H. McCormack Medal to Lydia Ko. Cho played her final event as an amateur in February 2012, finishing tied for 12th at the New Zealand Women's Open.

== Professional career ==
On turning professional, Cho reverted to using her Korean name and sporting nationality and joined the LPGA of Korea Tour. She played mostly on the developmental Dream Tour in 2012, where she recorded one win and finished 6th on the money list. Cho played on the KLPGA in 2013. She finished 66th on the money list and played on the Dream Tour again in 2014, but finished 8th at KLPGA Q-School and returned to the KLPGA full time in 2015. On the 2015 KLPGA, she finished 30th on the money list and had one runner-up finish.

In 2016, Cho had a breakthrough year on the KLPGA. She registered a surprise victory at the limited field Dalat Championship in Vietnam in March, and followed that up with a full field win at the Caido-MBC Plus Women's Open in July. She also had runner-up finishes at the Nexen-Saintnine Masters and the Hite Jinro Championship, a KLPGA major. She finished 9th on the money list with over 550 million won earned.

In 2016, Cho also represented the KLPGA at The Queens team event. She won her singles match against Yukari Nishiyama and a team match against Europe when teamed with Ko Jin-young.

On the 2018 KLPGA, she had one win and two runner-up finishes and nearly 500 million won in earnings, for a 9th place on the money list. She also played in two LPGA Tour events, with her best finish a tie for 21st at the LPGA KEB Hana Bank Championship. 2019 was an even stronger season, with two wins and three runner-ups. She earned almost 700 million won for a 7th place on the money list.

In 2020, she started to struggle, with a best finish all year of 19th place. She was able to hold on to her KLPGA tour card, but in 2021 she only made 38 million won for a 96th on the money list, and was left without a card for 2022.

== Amateur wins ==
- 2009 New Zealand Women's Amateur
- 2010 New Zealand Women's Amateur, Australian Women's Amateur Stroke Play Championship
- 2011 Riversdale Cup, New Zealand Under 19, Grange Classic

== Professional wins (6) ==
=== LPGA of Korea Tour wins (5) ===
- 2016 The Dalat at 1200 Ladies Championship, Caido-MBC Plus Women's Open
- 2018 The 8th Lotte Cantata Ladies Open
- 2019 Celltrion Queens Masters, BC Card Hankyung Ladies Cup

=== WPGA Tour of Australasia wins (1) ===
- 2024 Navigate Advisors Wagga Wagga Women's Pro-Am

== Team appearances ==
Amateur

- Espirito Santo Trophy (representing New Zealand): 2010
- Astor Trophy (representing New Zealand): 2011
- Queen Sirikit Cup (representing New Zealand): 2011

Professional

- The Queens (representing Korea): 2016 (winners)
