= Julia Boland =

Australian professional golfer

Personal information
- Full name: Julia Elisabeth Boland
- Nationality: Australia
- Born: 26 November 1985 (age 40) Tamworth, New South Wales, Australia
- Height: 5 ft 9 in (1.75 m)

Career
- Sport: Golf
- College: University of Sydney; Texas A&M
- Turned professional: 2011
- Current tour: ALPG Tour
- Former tours: Symetra Tour; LPGA Tour
- Professional wins: 1

Number of wins by tour
- Epson Tour: 1

Best results in LPGA major championships
- Chevron Championship: DNP
- Women's PGA C'ship: CUT: 2013, 2014
- U.S. Women's Open: DNP
- Women's British Open: DNP
- Evian Championship: DNP

Julia Elisabeth Boland (born 26 November 1985) is an Australian professional golfer. She graduated to the LPGA Tour after finishing 8th in the 2012 Symetra Tour.

== Early life and amateur career ==
In 1985, Boland was born in Tamworth, New South Wales. She is the youngest of four children.

She studied at the University of Sydney while playing for the NSW team and the Australian Amateur team. She won the 2009 Australian Women's Amateur Stroke Play Championship.

After winning the Karrie Webb Series she joined the Texas A&M Aggies. She played a lone season in College Station and recorded three victories for the Aggies. She was an All-Big 12 selection and was named Newcomer of the Year in 2010.

== Professional career ==
In her rookie season on the Symetra Tour in 2012, she won the Four Winds Invitational in August and finished eighth on the money list to earn her LPGA Tour card for 2013.

In March 2018, Boland was elected as President of the ALPG (Australia Ladies Professional Golf).

== Professional wins (1) ==
=== Symetra Tour wins (1) ===
- 2012 Four Winds Invitational

== Team appearances ==
Amateur

- Espirito Santo Trophy (representing Australia): 2008, 2010
- Tasman Cup (representing Australia): 2007
- Queen Sirikit Cup (representing Australia): 2009
