= Avani Prashanth =

Indian professional golfer (born 2006)

Personal information
- Nationality: India
- Born: 7 October 2006 (age 20) Bangalore, India

Career
- Sport: Golf
- Turned professional: 2024
- Current tour: Ladies European Tour
- Professional wins: 3

Avani Prashanth (born 7 October 2006) is an Indian professional golfer. She was the youngest player in the Indian squad for the Asian Games at Hangzhou, China in 2023. She became the first amateur player from India to take part in the Augusta National Women's Amateur tournament.

== Early life ==
Prashanth was born in Bangalore. Her father, M.S. Prashanth, encouraged her to play golf. She attends Greenwood High International School, Bangalore. She started playing golf at an early age of 3 years and 10 months. She is currently India's No. 1 amateur golfer. She trained under Laurence Brotheridge of Great Britain for four years.

== Amateur career ==
In February 2021, Prashanth won her first tournament on the Hero Women's Professional Golf Tour in Mumbai. In October, she won her second tournament in the Hero Women's Professional Golf Tour at Panchkula. She also won both the All India Ladies and Amateur titles. She played the Women's Amateur Asia Pacific Golf Championship in Abu Dhabi and finished T-16.

In 2022, she won her third Hero Women's Pro Golf Tour event and won the individual and team gold in the 36th National Games.

In February 2023, she represent India in the Queen Sirikit Cup with the team finishing second to South Korean and Prashanth winning the individual event. In May, she finished first in the selection trials for the Asian Games. In September, she won the Ahlsell Final to become the first Indian to win on the LET Access Series.

Prashanth turned professional in 2024 and plays on the Ladies European Tour.

== Amateur wins ==
- 2020 Champions Prestige Junior & Amateur Challenge
- 2021 IGU All India Ladies Amateur Championship
- 2022 IGU Telangana Ladies & Junior Girls Golf Championship, National Games, IGU Western India Ladies and Junior Girls Golf Championship, All India Ladies Amateur, All India Juniors
- 2023 Queen Sirikit Cup (individual), Asian Game Trials, Ahlsell Final

== Professional wins ==
=== LET Access Serires wins ===
- 2023 Ahlsell Final (as an amateur)

=== Hero Women's Pro Golf Tour wins (3) ===
- 2021 Hero Women's Pro Golf Tour Leg 3, Hero Women's Pro Golf Tour Leg 11 (both as an amateur)
- 2022 Hero Women's Pro Golf Tour Leg 15 (as an amateur)

== Team appearances ==
Amateur

- Queen Sirikit Cup (representing India): 2023
- Patsy Hankins Trophy (representing Asia/Pacific team): 2023
