= Asia-Pacific Golf Confederation =

- Sport: Golf
- Jurisdiction: Asia-Pacific
- Abbreviation: APGC
- Founded: 1963
- Affiliation: International Golf Federation
- Headquarters: Melbourne, Australia
- Location: British Virgin Islands

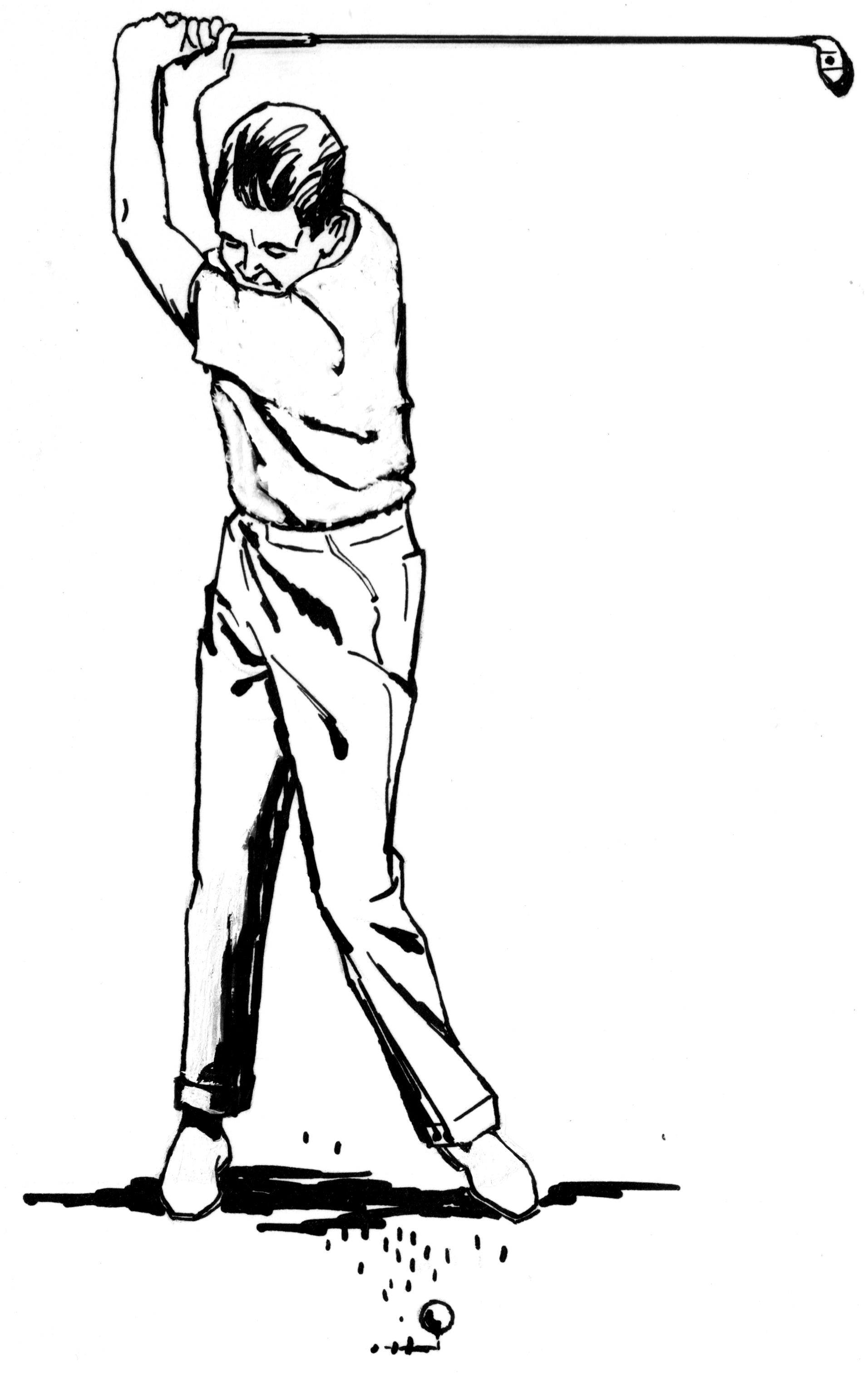
by Pearson Scott Foresman

The Asia-Pacific Golf Confederation, known by the abbreviation APGC, is an Asia-Pacific federation of national golf associations. The APGC organizes the major international amateur championships in the region and promotes golf.

== History ==
The organization has its beginnings in 1962 during the Eisenhower Trophy in Kawana, Japan, when a tri-nation tournament between the Philippines, Japan and Chinese Taipei was proposed. The inaugural Asian Amateur Golf Team Championship was held 1963 in the Philippines, with a trophy donated by Shun Nomura that became known as the Nomura Cup, and the Amateur Golf Confederation of Asia was formed.

The R&A started to help the APGC in 2002 when they offered to provide financial support for running the Nomura Cup.

=== Tours ===
In 1969, the confederation assumed responsibility for running the Asia Golf Circuit. The circuit was made up of a number of National Opens which were run by national golf associations, the same bodies that were members of the confederation. In 1987 the APGC launched the Asian Ladies Circuit, with a five-year sponsorship from Kosaido Development Corporation. In 1995 the Asian Professional Golfers' Association launched the rival Asian Tour, which lead to the APGC tours' demise, and the tour folded in 1999. This ended the APGC's 30-year direct involvement with the tour and professional golf.

== Member federations ==
The confederation has over 42 member federations from across Asia-Pacific.

Members (42)
East zone (6)	Southeast zone (9)	South/Central zone (8)	West zone (9)	Oceanic zone (10)
Japan; South Korea; Chinese Taipei; China; Hong Kong; Macau	Philippines; Singapore; Malaysia; Thailand; Indonesia; Vietnam; Cambodia; Laos; Myanmar	Bangladesh; Bhutan; India; Nepal; Pakistan; Sri Lanka; Mongolia; Kyrgyzstan	Bahrain; Iran; Iraq; Jordan; Lebanon; Oman; Qatar; Saudi Arabia; United Arab Emirates	Australia; New Zealand; Papua New Guinea; Guam; Fiji; American Samoa; Samoa; Solomon Islands; Cook Islands; Vanuatu

== Championships ==
The APGC organizes a range of amateur events, including the Nomura Cup and the Asia-Pacific Amateur (formerly known as the Asian Amateur), a championship put together in cooperation with the Masters Tournament and The R&A. The event offers the winner an invitation to the Masters Tournament at Augusta National Golf Club and the Open Championship. The event rotates throughout the region and has been held in China, Japan, Singapore, Thailand, Australia, Hong Kong, Korea, and New Zealand.

=== Regional championships ===
- Nomura Cup – Asia-Pacific Amateur Golf Team Championship (1963–)
- Queen Sirikit Cup – Asia-Pacific Amateur Ladies Golf Team Championship (1979–) founded by Thailand Ladies Golf Association
- Asia-Pacific Senior Amateur Championship (1986–)
- Asia-Pacific Junior Championship (2009–)
- Asia-Pacific Amateur Championship (2009–)
- Women's Amateur Asia-Pacific Championship (2018–)

=== International matches ===
The APGC organizes a number of international matches together with the European Golf Association:

- Bonallack Trophy (1998–)
- Patsy Hankins Trophy (1998–)

== See also ==
- Asia Golf Circuit
- Asian Tour
- Ladies Asian Golf Tour
- Asian Development Tour
