= Nepal Police Hospital =

Government hospital in Kathmandu, Bagmati, Nepal

Geography
- Location: Maharajgunj, kathmandu, Bagmati Province, Nepal
- Coordinates: 27°43′52″N 85°19′24″E

Organisation
- Type: District General

Services
- Emergency department: Yes
- Beds: 400 beds

History
- Former name: Birendra Police Hospital
- Opened: 2040 BS (1983–1984)

Links
- Website: https://nph.nepalpolice.gov.np

Nepal Police Hospital is a government hospital located in Maharajgunj of Kathmandu in Bagmati Province of Nepal. It was opened with an intention to provide free health services to in- service policemen, and ex-servicemen including their families. From 2075 BS (2018–2019), the hospital has been providing OPD services for public civilian.

== History ==
It was inaugurated by the late king Birendra Bir Bikram Shah Dev in 2040 BS (1983–1984). as a 25 bedded hospital along with opd services operated by 5 doctors, some nurses, paramedics and other staffs. At the initial phase, it was run by the support of Indian Government and a Japanese club but now it's completely under the Government of Nepal and Police welfare fund.

== Services ==
The services available in Nepal police hospital includes:

- Anesthesiology Department
- Emergency Department
- Pathology Department
- Internal Medicine
- Diet and Nutrition Department
- Cardiology Department
- Physiotherapy Department
- Ophthalmology Department
- Hemodialysis Department
- HIV/ARV, Family planning, TB-DOTS, Immunization
- Radiology Department
- NICU
- OPD : Orthopedics, General Surgery, Pediatrics, General Medicine, Dermatology, Psychiatric, ENT, Gynecology and Obstetrics
- Dental Department, Oral and Maxillofacial Surgery Department
- ICU
