= Leonora Wray =

Australian golfer

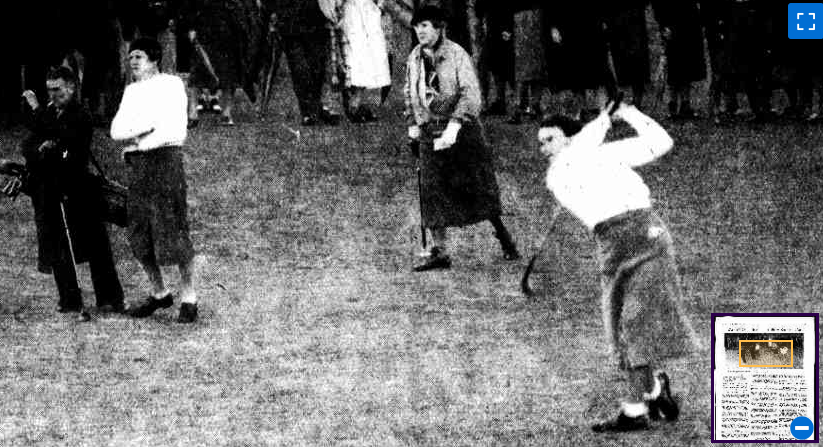
- Women's Golf Title 1938, Betty Kernot's Win in progress at the 9th. Wray is the umpire.

Personal information
- Nationality: Australian
- Born: 2 July 1886 East Maitland, Sydney, New South Wales
- Died: 4 April 1979 (aged 92)

Career
- Sport: Golf

Leonora Wray MBE (2 July 1886 – 4 April 1979) was an Australian golfer, often referred to as the "mother" of Australian golf.

Wray won the Australian Women's Amateur in 1907, 1908 and 1929 and the New South Wales Women's Amateur Championship in 1906, 1907, 1908 and 1930. In 1935, she competed against Britain in the Australian Women’s Golf Championship.

Her career was interrupted for many years due to typhoid fever.

Wray was president of the Australian Ladies’ Golf Union from 1954 to 1959.

Women’s Golf NSW established the Leonora Wray Scratch Teams annual event, and the Leonora Wray Trophy. She helped establish the Tasman Cup competition with New Zealand.

In 1968, in recognition of her services to golf, she was made a Member of the Order of the British Empire (MBE), and in 1985 she was inducted into the Sport Australia Hall of Fame.
