= Bahadur Singh Baral =

Nepali national poet and military officer (1892–1962)

Captain Bahadur Singh Baral
- Born: Bahadur Singh Baral; 15 April 1895; Deuchuli, Nawalparasi (now Nawalpur District)
- Died: 16 October 1962 (aged 67) Village Dari, Distt kangra, Himachal Pradesh, India
- Branch: British Indian Army
- Rank: Captain
- Awards: O.B.I; M.V.O.
- Spouses: Saraswati Baral (deceased), Dilmaya Baral
- Children: Khadgajeet Baral

Captain Bahadur Singh Baral (15 April 1892 – 16 October 1962) was a Nepali national poet and a military officer. He served as a subedar-major and honorary captain in the 2nd battalion of the First Gorkha Rifle of the British Indian Army.

He is known to have provided financial supports to the top Nepali Congress leaders, including late BP Koirala, during the 1951 revolution against the autocratic Rana regime in Nepal.

He is also known for his contributions to Nepali literature. He wrote several poems which comprise "Baral ko Asu", a poem book written by him. It consists of poems of religion, patriotism, equality, social reforms, and the bravery of the Gorkhalis.

== Biography ==
=== British Indian Army ===
Originally hailing from then Palpa (now Nawalpur) district, both Baral and his father were subedar-majors in the Second Battalion of the First Gorkha Rifle in the British Indian Army, which Baral had commandeered in World War II.

Directly commissioned as a Jamdar in the 2nd battalion of the 1st Gorkha Rifles on 16 June 1913, Baral rose to the rank of subedar major.

After exhibiting 'valor' in WWI, Baral was decorated with the 'Member of Victorian Order (MVO)' and 'Order of British India (OBI)'.

Baral retired in 1935. Following his retirement, from 1935 to 1939, he was the president of All India Gorkha Association, in addition to the president of Gorkha Dhoghabhet-Satsang Pracharini Sabha.

After the onset of WWII, he rejoined military service. He retired in 1952. During this time period, he was conferred the rank of an 'honorary captain'.

=== Music and literature ===
He is the author of the book Baral ko Ansu. It was republished in 1932, 1933, 1935, 1936, and 1938. A new edition was published in 1993 by his son Khadgajeet Baral, and again on 2013, edited by Dr. Khagendra P. Luitel, head of the Nepali Department of Tribhuvan University.

=== Guru Gorakhnath Temple ===
Bahadur Singh had helped contributing to the establishment of the Guru Gorakhnath Temple in Bhagsu, Dari in Dharamshala, District Kangra, Himachal Pradesh in India.
