= Katy Jarochowicz =

Australian golfer

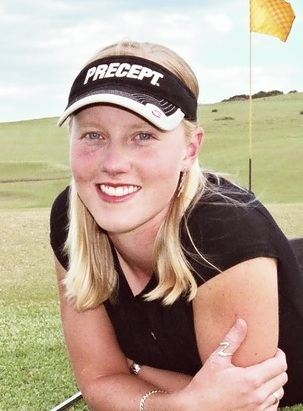
- Jarochowicz in 2016

Personal information
- Nationality: Australia

Career
- Sport: Golf
- Former tours: ALPG Tour; Ladies European Tour; Duramed Futures Tour

Katy Jarochowicz (born 6 March 1981) is an Australian professional golfer and businesswoman. Jarochowicz plays mostly on the Australian-based ALPG Tour, and at times in the US on the LPGA Tour. She is best known for her achievements as number 1 Amateur in her youth and winner of the Texas Open.

At 4 years old, Jarochowicz received her first golfing lesson. During her teenage years, she discovered that golf was to be her career and attended the Jack Newton Junior Golf (JNJG). She represented Australia internationally as an amateur before turning professional in 2004. Jarochowicz later toured Australia & New Zealand on the ALPG Tour and throughout Europe on the Ladies European Tour.

== Amateur wins ==
- 2003 Australian Women's Amateur

== Professional wins ==
- 2009 Texas Women's Open

== Team appearances ==
Amateur

- Espirito Santo Trophy (representing Australia): 2004
- Tasman Cup (representing Australia): 2001 (winners), 2003 (winners)
- Queen Sirikit Cup (representing Australia): 2003
