= Australian Girls' Amateur =

National junior golf championship for girls in Australia

The Australian Girls' Amateur is the national junior golf championship of Australia for girls. It was first played in 1953. It is run by Golf Australia.

== History ==
From 1953 to 1983 the event was for "juniors" (under-21) and was played in conjunction with the stroke-play qualifying stage of the Australian Women's Amateur. From 1953 to 1973 and from 1978 to 1983 qualification was over 36-holes but from 1974 to 1977 it was over 72 holes. However in 1974 the junior event was still decided by the scores over the first 36 holes, while in 1975 and 1976 the junior event was decided over the first 54 holes. From 1984 it became a separate event. From 1984 to 1999 it was played as a match-play event with a 36-hole final. In 1993 the age limit was reduced from 21 to 18. In 2000 it became a 54-hole stroke-play event, before being extended to 72 holes in 2012.

== Winners ==
- 2026 Amelia Harris
- 2025 Raegan Denton
- 2024 Shyla Singh
- 2023 Ann Jang
- 2022 Jeneath Wong
- 2021 Jeneath Wong
- 2020 Not played
- 2019 Hye Park
- 2018 Maddison Hinson-Tolchard
- 2017 Grace Kim
- 2016 Karis Davidson
- 2015 Celina Yuan
- 2014 Konomi Matsumoto
- 2013 Minjee Lee
- 2012 Su-Hyun Oh
- 2011 Cathleen Santoso
- 2010 Annie Choi
- 2009 Ashley Ona
- 2008 Whitney Hillier
- 2007 Haeji Kang
- 2006 Sarah Oh
- 2005 Mi Sun Cho
- 2004 Mi Sun Cho
- 2003 Sarah Kemp
- 2002 Sarah Jane Kenyon
- 2001 Kyla Welsh
- 2000 Dana Lacey
- 1999 Melanie Holmes-Smith
- 1998 Gloria Park
- 1997 Gloria Park
- 1996 Gloria Park
- 1995 Tammie Durdin
- 1994 Stacey Doggett
- 1993 Simone Williams
- 1992 Loraine Lambert
- 1991 Cathy Neilson
- 1990 Trudi Jeffrey
- 1989 Wendy Doolan
- 1988 Mardi Lunn
- 1987 Mardi Lunn
- 1986 Mardi Lunn
- 1985 Louise Mullard
- 1984 Elizabeth Wilson
- 1983 Louise Mullard
- 1982 Jane Connachan
- 1981 Diane Mancell
- 1980 Penny Edmunds and
  Diane Mancell
- 1979 Edwina Kennedy
- 1978 Edwina Kennedy
- 1977 Edwina Kennedy
- 1976 Edwina Kennedy
- 1975 Jane Lock
- 1974 Jane Lock
- 1973 Jane Lock
- 1972 Vicki Jellis
- 1971 Jan Stephenson
- 1970 Sandra Williams
- 1969 Gayle Flynn
- 1968 Jan Stephenson
- 1967 Jan Stephenson
- 1966 Marea Hickey
- 1965 Marea Hickey
- 1964 Robyn Bennett
- 1963 Beatrice Hayley
- 1962 Beatrice Hayley
- 1961 Barbara Coulson
- 1960 Beverley Ross
- 1959 Gail Corry
- 1958 Nicki Campbell
- 1957 Dorothy Gardiner
- 1956 Pam Main
- 1955 June Gillespie
- 1954 June Gillespie
- 1953 Margaret Masters

== See also ==
- Australian Boys' Amateur
- Australian Women's Amateur
