= Mohan Baral =

Nepali politician

Personal details
- Party: Nepali Congress

Mohan Prasad Baral (born 4 December 1972) is a Nepali politician and the former Member of Parliament. He belongs to Nepali Congress.
