= Royal Nepal Golf Club =

Golf course

Coordinates: 27.70271°N 85.354328°E

- Interactive map of Royal Nepal Golf Club

Club information
- Location: Tribhuvan International Airport, Gaucharan, Kathmandu, Nepal
- Established: 1917 (Official: 1965) by General Kiran Shumsher
- Type: Semi-Private
- Owner: Government of Nepal
- Tota holes: 18
- Tournaments: Hayata Cup; The Surya Nepal Pvt. Ltd. Masters; Surya Nepal Open; The Surya Nepal Challenge Golf Tournament
- Greens: Poa annua grass
- Fairways: Bermuda grass
- Website: www.nga.org.np/members.php

The first golf course in Nepal was the Gauchar Golf Course, in Gaucharan, established by General Kiran Shumsher in 1917, after observing the sport in Scotland. This first course was in Nepal 'browns', i.e. greens consisted of sand mixed with oil. King Tribhuvan Shah and his son Prince Basundhara Shah also played golf.

When the adjacent airfield was expanded, the golf course had to be shortened. On September 5, 1965, the club received the designation 'Royal' (patronage) by King Mahendra, the son of Tribhuvan, and the club was named "The Royal Nepal Golf Club (RNGC)" and Prince Basundra became the second president of the club. The founder members of the RNGC were the then S.P. Khadgajeet Baral (Retd. IGP), the then tennis champion Hem Lama, etc. The members were mostly foreigners and members of the Shah and Rana families. When the airport was expanded again in 1982, the golf course was remodeled.

In 1983, the Royal Nepal Golf Course was awarded another ground. They started with the construction of six par-3 holes. A year later two par-3 holes and a par-4 hole with. In 1986, she gained more ground so there finally came a full 9-hole course. In the year 1989, all the greens were modernized with the use of Bermuda grass by the then President of RNGC, Khadgajeet Baral.

The club has a very challenging 9-hole golf course which organizes over 26 golf tournaments annually, and had held the first ever Nepal Open Golf tournament for professionals of the region for 6 years. All the professionals described the course as "highly challenging but fair golf course with a fantastic view of the Himalayas".

== See also ==
- List of golf clubs granted Royal status
