= New South Wales Open (golf) =

Golf tournament

Ford NSW Open
Tournament information
- Location: Rothbury, New South Wales, Australia
- Established: 1931
- Course: The Vintage Golf Course
- Par: 71
- Length: 6,827 yards (6,243 m)
- Tours: PGA Tour of Australasia; Von Nida Tour
- Format: Stroke play
- Prize fund: A$800,000
- Month played: November

Tournament record score
- Aggregate: 264 Jason Scrivener (2017); 264 David Micheluzzi (2023)
- To par: −24 Jason Scrivener (2017)

Current champion
- (Australia) Ben Eccles

Location map
- Location in Australia Location in New South Wales

The New South Wales Open is an annual golf tournament held in New South Wales, Australia. The event was founded in 1931 as the New South Wales Close Championship, being restricted to residents of New South Wales, becoming the New South Wales Open Championship in 1958 when it was opened up to players from outside New South Wales. Norman Von Nida won the event six times, while Jim Ferrier and Frank Phillips won it five times with Greg Norman winning it four times.

== History ==
The event was founded in 1931 as the New South Wales Close Championship, being restricted to residents of New South Wales. The first event was held at Manly Golf Club and, after 72 holes played over two days, resulted in a tie between three professionals Charlie Gray, Tom Howard and Sam Richardson. Gray won the title after a 36-hole playoff scoring 147 to Howard's 148. Richardson took 80 in the first round and didn't complete the 36 holes. Richardson won in 1932 but the remainder of the 1930s were dominated by Jim Ferrier who won five times and was runner-up twice between 1933 and 1939. Three times he won by 10 or more strokes.

Norman Von Nida won in 1939 and then again from 1946 to 1948, to repeat Ferrier record of four successive wins. In 1951 a New South Wales Jubilee Open was organised, the state's first open championship, to celebrate the 50th anniversary of the founding of the Federation of Australia. The tournament was won by Dai Rees while Kel Nagle was runner-up and won the Close title. Von Nida won the Close championship again in 1953 and 1954, setting a record of six championship wins. The 1955 event clashed with the first Pelaco Tournament in Melbourne, an event which attracted all the leading New South Wales professionals.

In 1958 the championship was opened up to players from outside New South Wales, becoming the New South Wales Open Championship. Peter Thomson from Victoria won in 1961. Two amateur's won in the 1970s, Owen Beldham in 1972 and Tony Gresham in 1975, while American Ed Sneed won in 1973.

The tournament continued to be a major event in the 1980s. Greg Norman won three times in the decade and the 1989 event had prize money of A$300,000. The event then struggled for a number of years. The 1990 championship had prize money of A$50,000 and there was no event in 1991. In 1992 it had increased prize money of A$150,000 but there was again no event the following year. It returned in 1994 on the second-tier Foundation Tour with prize money of A$50,000 and was then not played again until 2002, when it returned with prize money of A$200,000.

From 2003 to 2008 the event was part of the second-tier Von Nida Tour, while from 2009 to 2015 it was a Tier 2 event on the PGA Tour of Australasia schedule. In 2016 it became a Tier 1 event with prize money of A$400,000 compared to the A$110,000 in 2015.

== Winners ==
Year	Tour (Note: ANZ − PGA Tour of Australasia; FT − Foundation Tour; VNT − Von Nida Tour.)	Winner	Score	To par	Margin of victory	Runner(s)-up	Venue	Ref.
Ford NSW Open
2026	ANZ	(Australia) Ben Eccles (2)	274	−10	Playoff	(Australia) Lachlan Aylen (Australia) Adam Bland	The Vintage	
2025	ANZ	(Australia) Christopher Wood	278	−6	Playoff	(Australia) Will Florimo (Australia) James Marchesani	The Vintage	
2024	ANZ	(Australia) Lucas Herbert	269	−15	3 strokes	(Australia) Corey Lamb (Australia) Alex Simpson (Australia) Cameron Smith	Murray Downs	
Play Today NSW Open
2023	ANZ	(Australia) David Micheluzzi	264	−20	2 strokes	(Australia) Kade McBride	Rich River	
Golf Challenge NSW Open
2022	ANZ	(Australia) Harrison Crowe (a)	195 (Note: Shortened to 54 holes due to weather.)	−18	1 stroke	(Australia) Blake Windred	Concord	
2021	ANZ	(Australia) Bryden Macpherson	266	−18	3 strokes	(Australia) Elvis Smylie (Australia) Jack Thompson	Concord	
AVJennings NSW Open
2020: No tournament
2019	ANZ	(Australia) Josh Younger	271	−17	Playoff	(Australia) Travis Smyth	Twin Creeks	
2018	ANZ	(Australia) Jake McLeod	268	−20	2 strokes	(Australia) Cameron John	Twin Creeks	
NSW Open
2017	ANZ	(Australia) Jason Scrivener	264	−24	6 strokes	(Australia) Lucas Herbert	Twin Creeks	
2016	ANZ	(Australia) Adam Blyth	265	−23	3 strokes	(Australia) Brett Coletta (a) (Australia) Jarryd Felton	Stonecutters Ridge	
2015	ANZ	(Australia) Ben Eccles (a)	269	−19	3 strokes	(Australia) Rohan Blizard (Australia) Matthew Millar	Stonecutters Ridge	
Mazda NSW Open
2014	ANZ	(Australia) Anthony Brown	274	−14	Playoff	(New Zealand) Josh Geary	Stonecutters Ridge	
Gloria Jean's Coffees NSW Open
2013	ANZ	(Australia) Aron Price	269	−19	4 strokes	(Australia) Adam Bland (Australia) Aaron Townsend (Australia) Jack Wilson	Castle Hill	
NSW Open
2012: No tournament
2011	ANZ	(Australia) Adam Crawford	274	−6	1 stroke	(Australia) Paul Donahoo (Australia) Jake Higginbottom (a) (Australia) Anthony Summers	Newcastle	
2010	ANZ	(Australia) Peter O'Malley	270	−18	Playoff	(Australia) Peter Cooke (England) Tom Lewis (a)	Vintage	
2009	ANZ	(Australia) Leigh McKechnie	281	−3	1 stroke	(Australia) James Nitties	Vintage	
2008	VNT	(Australia) Aaron Townsend	267	−17	7 strokes	(Australia) Steven Jones	Vintage	
Vintage NSW Open
2007	VNT	(Australia) Jason Norris	277	−7	1 stroke	(Australia) Jarrod Lyle	Vintage	
Proton New South Wales Open
2006	VNT	(Australia) Rick Kulacz (a)	270	−10	Playoff	(Australia) Tony McFadyean	Moore Park	
2005	VNT	(Australia) Michael Wright	271	−17	2 strokes	(Australia) Brad McIntosh	Liverpool	
NSW Open
2004	VNT	(Australia) Peter Lonard	270	−18	2 strokes	(Australia) Anthony Summers	Liverpool	
GolfSkins New South Wales Open
2003	VNT	(Australia) Craig Carmichael	273	−15	1 stroke	(Australia) Andrew McKenzie (a)	Macquarie Links	
New South Wales Open
2002	ANZ	(Australia) Terry Price	279	−9	1 stroke	(Australia) Wayne Grady (Australia) Adam Groom (Australia) Jason Norris (New Zealand) Mahal Pearce (Australia) Andre Stolz	Horizons Resort	
1995–2001: No tournament
1994	FT	(Australia) Darren Chivas	283	−5	1 stroke	(Australia) David Ecob	Manly	
1993	ANZ	Cancelled due to lack of sponsorship						
CIG New South Wales Open
1992	ANZ	(Australia) Craig Parry (2)	277	−7	Playoff	(Australia) Ken Trimble	Ryde Parramatta	
New South Wales Open
1991: No tournament
1990	ANZ	(Australia) Ken Trimble	276	−8	2 strokes	(Australia) Peter O'Malley	Bathurst	
Ford New South Wales Open
1989	ANZ	(Australia) Rodger Davis	277	−15	9 strokes	(Australia) Bradley Hughes	The Lakes	
Panasonic New South Wales Open
1988	ANZ	(Australia) Greg Norman (4)	277	−7	1 stroke	(Australia) Craig Parry	Concord	
National Panasonic New South Wales Open
1987	ANZ	(Australia) Craig Parry	289	+1	1 stroke	(Australia) Wayne Riley	The Australian	
1986	ANZ	(Australia) Greg Norman (3)	275	−9	5 strokes	(Australia) Lyndsay Stephen	Concord	
1985	ANZ	(Australia) Ian Stanley	281	−3	1 stroke	(Australia) Peter Senior (Australia) Lyndsay Stephen	Concord	
1984	ANZ	(Australia) Ian Baker-Finch	277	−15	13 strokes	(Australia) Peter Senior	The Lakes	
1983	ANZ	(Australia) Greg Norman (2)	278	−4	Playoff	(Australia) David Graham	Concord	
1982	ANZ	(Australia) Bob Shearer	272	−12	1 stroke	(Australia) Graham Marsh	Manly	
1981	ANZ	(United States) Bill Rogers	285	−7	3 strokes	(Australia) Lyndsay Stephen	The Lakes	
New South Wales Open
1980	ANZ	(Australia) George Serhan	280	−4	4 strokes	(Scotland) Sam Torrance	Concord	
1979	ANZ	(Australia) Jack Newton (2)	281	−11	9 strokes	(Australia) Wayne Grady (England) Jeff Hall (United States) Gary Vanier	The Lakes	
1978	ANZ	(Australia) Greg Norman	275	−13	3 strokes	(Australia) Bill Dunk	Manly	
1977	ANZ	(Australia) Trevor McDonald	281	−7	Playoff	(Australia) Bill Dunk	Pymble	
1976	ANZ	(Australia) Jack Newton	269	−19	10 strokes	(Australia) Ted Ball (Australia) David Good	Royal Sydney	
1975	ANZ	(Australia) Tony Gresham (a)	275	−13	1 stroke	(Australia) Bill Dunk	Manly	
1974	ANZ	(Australia) Ted Ball (2)	280	−8	7 strokes	(Australia) Kel Nagle	Pymble	
1973	ANZ	(United States) Ed Sneed	283	−5	2 strokes	(Australia) Bob Shearer	The Australian	
1972		(Australia) Owen Beldham (a)	284	−4	3 strokes	(Australia) Bob Tuohy	Newcastle	
1971		(Australia) Bill Dunk (2)	284	−8	2 strokes	(Australia) Phil Billings (a) (Australia) Col Johnston	Manly	
1970		(Australia) Frank Phillips (5)	277	−11	Playoff	(Australia) David Graham	Pymble	
1969: No tournament
1968		(Australia) Kel Nagle (3)	289	+1	Playoff	(Australia) Barry Coxon (Australia) Bill Dunk	St. Michael's	
1967		(Australia) Bill Dunk	284	−4	2 strokes	(Australia) Darrell Welch	Royal Sydney	
1966		(Australia) Frank Phillips (4)	280	−4	Playoff	(Australia) Tim Woolbank	Concord	
1965		(Australia) Colin McGregor	286	−2	1 stroke	(Australia) Bob Mesnil (Australia) Bob Stanton (Australia) Darrell Welch	Bonnie Doon	
1964		(Australia) Ted Ball	289	+1	2 strokes	(Australia) Jim Moran (Australia) Frank Phillips	La Perouse	
1963		(Australia) Peter Mills	288	+4	2 strokes	(Australia) Frank Phillips	Moore Park	
1962		(Australia) Frank Phillips (3)	278	−10	2 strokes	(Australia) Ted Ball	Manly	
1961		(Australia) Peter Thomson	279	−9	7 strokes	(Australia) Kel Nagle	The Australian	
1960		(Australia) Frank Phillips (2)	279	−9	10 strokes	(Australia) John Sullivan	The Lakes	
1959		(Australia) Harry Kershaw	284	E	2 strokes	(Australia) Kel Nagle	Pennant Hills	
1958		(Australia) Les Wilson	294	+10	2 strokes	(Australia) Kel Nagle	Bonnie Doon	
New South Wales Close
1957		(Australia) Kel Nagle (2)	281	−7	1 stroke	(Australia) Len Woodward	Armidale	
1956		(Australia) Frank Phillips	279	−5	7 strokes	(Australia) Kel Nagle	Concord	
1955		(Australia) Bob Swinbourne	301	+17	1 stroke	(Australia) Eddie Oakman	Goulburn	
1954		(Australia) Norman Von Nida (6)	283	−5	10 strokes	(Australia) Kel Nagle (Australia) Sam Richardson	The Lakes	
1953		(Australia) Norman Von Nida (5)	285	−3	9 strokes	(Australia) Kel Nagle	Newcastle	
1952		(Australia) Jim Moran	287	+7	1 stroke	(Australia) Norman Von Nida	Wollongong	
1951	New South Wales Jubilee Open (Note: The 1951 New South Wales Close title was contested as part of the New South Wales Jubilee Open.)							
1951		(Wales) Dai Rees	279	−9	5 strokes	(Australia) Kel Nagle	Royal Sydney	
1951	New South Wales Close							
1951		(Australia) Kel Nagle	284	−4	5 strokes	(Australia) Keith Pix (a)	Royal Sydney	
1950		(Australia) Eric Cremin (2)	289	+5	1 stroke	(Australia) Billy Bolger	Bathurst	
1949		(Australia) Eric Cremin	279	−5	12 strokes	(Australia) Kel Nagle	Concord	
1948		(Australia) Norman Von Nida (4)	281	−7	1 stroke	(Australia) Eric Cremin	Royal Sydney	
1947		(Australia) Norman Von Nida (3)	279	−9	2 strokes	(Australia) Alan Waterson (a)	Manly	
1946		(Australia) Norman Von Nida (2)	287	−1	1 stroke	(Australia) Ossie Pickworth	The Lakes	
1940–1945: No tournament due to World War II
1939		(Australia) Norman Von Nida	280	−4	4 strokes	(Australia) Jim Ferrier (a)	Concord	
1938		(Australia) Jim Ferrier (5) (a)	281	−7	13 strokes	(Australia) Sam Richardson	The Lakes	
1937		(Australia) Jim Ferrier (4) (a)	280	−4	10 strokes	(Australia) Norman Von Nida	Bonnie Doon	
1936		(Australia) Jim Ferrier (3) (a)	277	−11	4 strokes	(Australia) Sam Richardson	Manly	
1935		(Australia) Jim Ferrier (2) (a)	266	−10	16 strokes	(Australia) Don Spence (Australia) Alan Waterson (a)	Killara	
1934		(Australia) Sam Richardson (2)	284	E	3 strokes	(Australia) Jim Ferrier (a) (Australia) Tom Heard	Concord	
1933		(Australia) Jim Ferrier (a)	291	+3	4 strokes	(Australia) Sam Richardson	The Lakes	
1932		(Australia) Sam Richardson	295	+7	1 stroke	(Australia) Charlie Gray	La Perouse	
1931		(Australia) Charlie Gray	303	+15	Playoff	(Australia) Tom Howard (Australia) Sam Richardson	Manly	
