= Dunlop International =

Australian golf tournament

Tournament information
- Location: Australia
- Established: 1965
- Format: Stroke play
- Final year: 1972

Tournament record score
- Aggregate: 274 Jack Nicklaus (1971)

Final champion
- Tony Jacklin

The Dunlop International was a golf tournament held in Australia and played annually from 1965 to 1972. Prize money in 1965 was A£4,000, A$8,000 in 1966 in 1967, A$15,000 in 1968 and A$25,000 from 1969 to 1972. A few weeks after the conclusion of the 1972 tournament, sponsors Dunlop announced that it would no longer be held.

It was noted as having one of the best fields for an Australian tournament during its era. The 1967 event was expected to have defending U.S. Open champion Jack Nicklaus, Tony Jacklin, Bob Charles, and defending British Open champion Roberto De Vicenzo. It was reported by the Canberra Times that, "With all the top Australians as well, it will be a world-class field."

== Winners ==
Year	Winner	Country	Venue	Score	Margin of victory	Runner(s)-up	Winner's share	Ref
1965	Bruce Devlin	Australia	Yarra Yarra	285	1 stroke	(Australia) Peter Thomson	A£1,000	
1966	Bob Stanton	Australia	The Australian	294	Playoff	(United States) Arnold Palmer	A$2,000	
1967	Bob Stanton (2)	Australia	Royal Canberra	285	1 stroke	(Australia) Bruce Devlin	A$2,000	
1968	Bruce Devlin (2)	Australia	Royal Queensland	281	3 strokes	(England) Peter Townsend	A$2,500	
1969	Bruce Devlin (3)	Australia	Yarra Yarra	276	Playoff	(United States) Lee Trevino	A$4,000	
1970	Gary Player	South Africa	Royal Canberra	282	1 stroke	(United States) Bill Brask (Australia) Kel Nagle (United States) Lee Trevino	A$4,000	
1971	Jack Nicklaus	United States	Manly	274	7 strokes	(Australia) Bruce Crampton (England) Peter Oosterhuis	A$4,000	
1972	Tony Jacklin	England	Yarra Yarra	277	4 strokes	(Australia) David Graham (Thailand) Sukree Onsham	A$4,000	

In 1966 Stanton won at the second hole of a sudden-death playoff. In 1969 Devlin won at the first extra hole.
