= Yarra Yarra Golf Club =

Golf club in Bentleigh East, Victoria

- Location within Australia
- 37.931°S 145.075°E

Club information
- Location: 567 Warrigal Road; Bentleigh East, Victoria, Australia
- Established: 1929, 97 years ago 1898 (club)
- Type: Private
- Tota holes: 18
- Tournaments: Victorian Open; Women's Australian Open
- Website: yarrayarra.com.au
- Designed by: Alex Russell
- Par: 72
- Length: 6,155 m (6,731 yd)

The Yarra Yarra Golf Club is a private golf club in Australia, located in Victoria at Bentleigh East, a suburb southeast of Melbourne. It is one of the eight Melbourne Sandbelt championship courses and is renowned for its par-3s.

It has hosted the Women's Australian Open seven times as well as several editions of the Victorian Open. The club was formed in 1898 and the current course opened 97 years ago in 1929; it is named for the Yarra River.

In the 1970s the club professional was Geoff Parslow. In 1977 he won the Victorian Open when it was held at Yarra Yarra. His surprise victory garnered much media attention; he defeated some of the world's best, including Greg Norman and Johnny Miller.

== Tournaments hosted ==
- 1952 Ampol Tournament (Nov.)
- 1954 Ampol Tournament (Nov.)
- 1956 Ampol Tournament
- 1959 Victorian Open
- 1965 Dunlop International
- 1967 Victorian Open
- 1969 Dunlop International
- 1972 Dunlop International
- 1973 Victorian Open
- 1977 Victorian Open
- 1977 Australian PGA Championship
- 1985 Victorian Open
- 1986 Victorian Open
- 1995 Women's Australian Open
- 1996 Women's Australian Open
- 1997 Women's Australian Open
- 1998 Women's Australian Open
- 2000 Women's Australian Open
- 2001 Women's Australian Open
- 2002 Women's Australian Open
- 2017 Australian Amateur

== See also ==
- List of links golf courses
