= Christopher Wood (golfer) =

Australian professional golfer (born 1990)

Personal information
- Nationality: Australia
- Born: 20 December 1990 (age 35) Brisbane, Australia
- Height: 5 ft 9 in (1.75 m)
- Weight: 185 lb (84 kg)

Career
- Sport: Golf
- Turned professional: 2012
- Current tours: Asian Tour; PGA Tour of Australasia
- Former tour: PGA Tour China
- Professional wins: 3

Number of wins by tour
- PGA Tour of Australasia: 2
- Other: 1

Christopher Wood (born 20 December 1990) is an Australian professional golfer who plays on PGA Tour of Australasia and Asian Tour. He won the 2021 Victorian PGA Championship and the 2025 NSW Open.

== Early life and amateur career ==
Wood was born in Brisbane. He won the Australian Men's Interstate Teams Matches with Queensland twice, in 2010 and 2011, alongside Cameron Smith.

== Professional career ==
Wood turned professional in 2012 and joined the PGA Tour of Australasia, where he finished 3rd at the 2015 South Pacific Open Championship and at the 2016 Queensland PGA Championship. He won the 2017 Morobe Open in Papua New Guinea.

In 2019, Wood also played on the PGA Tour China, where he recorded several top-10s.

Wood won the 2021 Victorian PGA Championship at Moonah Links, and shot a course record 61 to take a four shot lead at the 102nd New Zealand Open in 2023, ultimately tying for 6th.

He won the 2025 NSW Open at The Vintage after prevailing in a three-way playoff.

In 2026, Wood earned status for the International Series on the Asian Tour by finishing top-10 at the LIV Golf Promotions event in Florida.

== Professional wins (3) ==
=== PGA Tour of Australasia wins (2) ===
No.	Date	Tournament	Winning score	Margin of victory	Runners-up
1	7 Feb 2021	Victorian PGA Championship	−20 (69-66-66-67=268)	1 stroke	(Australia) James Anstiss, (Australia) Michael Sim
2	16 Nov 2025	Ford NSW Open	−10 (73-70-67-68=278)	Playoff	(Australia) Will Florimo, (Australia) James Marchesani

PGA Tour of Australasia playoff record (1–0)

No.	Year	Tournament	Opponents	Result
1	2025	Ford NSW Open	(Australia) Will Florimo, (Australia) James Marchesani	Won with birdie on fourth extra hole Florimo eliminated by par on third hole

=== Other wins (1) ===
- 2017 Morobe Open (Papua New Guinea)

== Team appearances ==
Amateur

- Australian Men's Interstate Teams Matches (representing Queensland): 2010 (winners), 2011 (winners)
