= Sandy Galbraith =

American golfer

Personal information
- Full name: Sandy Galbraith
- Nationality: United States
- Born: c.1947

Career
- Sport: Golf
- College: Chapman University
- Turned professional: 1972
- Former tours: PGA Tour; PGA Tour of Australasia
- Professional wins: 2

Best results in major championships
- Masters Tournament: DNP
- PGA Championship: DNP
- U.S. Open: DNP
- The Open Championship: CUT: 1974

Sandy Galbraith (born c. 1947) is a former professional golfer and current amateur golfer. Early in his career Galbraith had much success as an amateur in his home state of California, winning the 1970 Northern California Open and finishing runner-up at the 1971 California State Amateur Championship and 1972 Pacific Coast Amateur. He turned pro shortly thereafter and made it onto the PGA Tour in the fall of 1975. Galbraith did not have much success on tour, however, only earning full-time status for two seasons. He had a little more success overseas, most notably losing to Greg Norman in a playoff at the 1978 South Seas Classic. Shortly afterwards, while working but as a mortgage banker, Galbraith recorded a number of high results in California amateur tournaments, including another runner-up finish at the 1991 California State Amateur Championship.

== Early life ==
Galbraith attended Chapman University in California. He was generally considered the best player on the golf team. He graduated from Chapman in 1969.

== Amateur career ==
Galbraith remained an amateur for a few years thereafter. In 1970, he played the Northern California Amateur at Spyglass Hill Golf Course. He reached the finals, taking Steve Bohn to the final hole, losing 1 up. In 1970, he also won the Northern California Open as an amateur. In 1971, he had success at the California State Amateur Championship held at Pebble Beach Golf Links. During the qualifying stage he shot 72–73 to earn medallist honors. Galbraith ultimately reached the finals but, in the 36 hole final match, lost to Doug Nelson 8 & 7. In 1972 he had much success in amateur tournaments. Galbraith finished joint runner-up at the 1972 Pacific Coast Amateur, two behind champion Mark Pfeil. He also had success at the Northern California Amateur's fourball championship, winning it with Bob Enslow. That year he was also champion of the Alameda Commuters amateur event.

== Professional career ==
As of September 1972, Galbraith had turned professional. In 1973, Galbraith played a two-round tournament sponsored by the Western Golf Association. In the first round, at Yorba Linda Country Club, he shot 66 and then a 71 at Serfas CC to win the tournament. He won $5,000 for his achievements.

In the mid-1970s Galbraith started playing in overseas professional events. In 1974 he qualified for the British Open. Galbraith opened poorly with an 86 (+15) to position himself in third to last place. He shot a 78 (+7) in the second round to miss the cut by a wide margin. As of 1975, he was playing events on the Asia Golf Circuit.

In late 1975 he attempted to join the PGA Tour at Fall 1975 PGA Tour Qualifying School. After the first two-rounds Galbraith was tied with Jerry Pate for the lead. He shot over par for the remainder of the tournament but managed to secure his PGA Tour card by two shots. Galbraith was not successful for most of his first season on tour, in 1976, missing the cut in 9 of his first 11 events. He had much success in his 12th event, however, at the San Antonio Texas Open. In the middle of the tournament he shot consecutive rounds of 68 (−4) on the way to a fourth-place finish. He earned $4,637 for his efforts. The following season he did not play well; in 1977, Galbraith missed the cut in 10 of the 12 events he played. He would not play on the PGA Tour again.

For the remainder of his professional career, Galbraith largely played in the Australasian region. In September 1978 he seriously contended for the South Seas Classic. He opened with a 69 (−3) to put himself near the lead. He entered the final round as a joint leader with fellow American Art Russell and New Zealand's Terry Kendall at 216. In the final round he led "all day" but bogeyed the par-4 16th to fall in a tie with Greg Norman. On the final hole Galbraith remained tied with Norman. He fired his approach over the green but hit a "great chip" to three-metres and made the par putt. Norman and Galbraith went into a sudden-death playoff. On the first two playoff holes, played in the 16th and 17th holes, both Norman and Galbraith made par 4s. On the 18th, however, Norman went up-and-down from a bunker, making a one-metre par putt, to defeat Galbraith.

By virtue of this performance Galbraith was now considered one of the favorites in tournaments down under. In October, he was considered one of the top American draws at the South Coast Open. At the beginning of the tournament he and Australian professional Bruce Smith won the "purse curtain-raiser" with rounds of three-under-par 68. Galbraith played well at the tournament proper. During the second round he shot a 69 (−2) to position himself at 140 (−2), one back of the lead. He ultimately finished in a tie for sixth at 287 (+3). In November, he was one of 22 players to succeed at the final qualifying stage for the Australian Open.

== Re-instated amateur status ==
In the 1980s, Galbraith quit pro golf and began working as a mortgage banker. He still played in notable amateur golf tournaments, however. In 1986, he won the Southern California Golf Association (SCGA) mid-amateur. In June 1991, he played the California State Amateur Championship. Like 1971, Galbraith was again the medallist. Galbraith then won his first two matches. In the quarterfinals he defeated Drew Sanders. Like 1971, he ultimately made it to the finals. There he lost to Harry Rudolph III, 3 & 2. In 1991 he also won the SCGA mid-amateur again. In 1992 he played in the British Amateur. Galbraith finished in third place in the qualifying stage. He won his first two matches before losing in the third round.

Galbraith retired from tournament golf in the early 2000s. He was inducted into the Chapman Hall of Fame in 2010.

== Personal life ==
As of 1991, he lived in Fountain Valley, California.

== Awards and honors ==
In 2010, Galbraith was inducted into the Chapman Hall of Fame.

== Amateur wins ==
- 1972 Alameda Commuters event
- 1986 Southern California Golf Association mid-amateur
- 1991 Southern California Golf Association mid-amateur

== Professional wins ==
- 1970 Northern California Open
- 1972 Western Golf Association tournament

== Results in major championships ==
Tournament	1974
The Open Championship	CUT

CUT = missed the halfway cut
Note: Galbraith only played in The Open Championship.

== See also ==
- Fall 1975 PGA Tour Qualifying School graduates
