= Wills Masters =

Tournament information
- Location: Australia
- Established: 1963
- Final year: 1975

Final champion
- David Graham

The Wills Masters was a golf tournament held in Australia and played annually from 1963 to 1975. The Wills Classic had been held in Australia from 1960 and 1962. Total prize money from 1963 to 1965 was A£4,000. In 1966 and 1967 it was A$8,000 increasing to A$10,000 in 1968, A$20,000 from 1969 to 1971, A$25,000 in 1972 and A$35,000 from 1973 to 1975. The sponsor was W.D. & H.O. Wills, a cigarette manufacturer.

== Winners ==
Year	Winner	Country	Venue	Score	Margin of victory	Runner(s)-up	Winner's share	Ref
1963	Arnold Palmer	United States	The Lakes Golf Club	285	2 strokes	(United States) Jack Nicklaus	A£1,000	
1964	Cobie Legrange	South Africa	Victoria Golf Club	277	3 strokes	(Australia) Bruce Devlin (United States) Jack Nicklaus		
1965	Bruce Devlin	Australia	The Australian Golf Club	286	1 stroke	(Australia) Peter Thomson		
1966	Kel Nagle	Australia	Victoria Golf Club	278	2 strokes	(Argentina) Roberto De Vicenzo	A$2,000	
1967	Alan Murray	Australia	The Australian Golf Club	290	Playoff	(Argentina) Roberto De Vicenzo		
1968	Gary Player	South Africa	Manly Golf Club	277	Playoff	(England) Peter Townsend		
1969	George Knudson	Canada	Victoria Golf Club	279	2 strokes	(Australia) Bob Stanton (Australia) Peter Thomson		
1970	Brian Barnes	Scotland	The Australian Golf Club	288	1 stroke	(Australia) Wally Gale (Canada) George Knudson (England) Guy Wolstenholme	A$3,300	
1971	Bruce Crampton	Australia	Victoria Golf Club	281	3 strokes	(England) Maurice Bembridge		
1972	Bob Murphy	United States	The Australian Golf Club	278	3 strokes	(Thailand) Sukree Onsham	A$3,800	
1973	Ted Ball	Australia	Victoria Golf Club	282	2 strokes	(United States) Jerry Heard	A$7,000	
1974	Ted Ball (2)	Australia	The Australian Golf Club	281	2 strokes	(South Africa) Gary Player (Australia) Ian Stanley	A$7,000	
1975	David Graham	Australia	Victoria Golf Club	282	2 strokes	(Australia) Rob McNaughton	A$7,000	

In 1967 Murray won at the first hole of a sudden-death playoff. In 1968 Player won at the second extra hole.
