= Blake Windred =

Australian professional golfer (born 1997)

Personal information
- Nationality: Australia
- Born: 3 December 1997 (age 28) Newcastle, NSW, Australia

Career
- Sport: Golf
- Turned professional: 2019
- Current tours: European Tour; PGA Tour of Australasia
- Former tours: Challenge Tour; LIV Golf
- Professional wins: 1

Number of wins by tour
- PGA Tour of Australasia: 1

Blake Windred (born 3 December 1997) is an Australian professional golfer. He won the 2021 Victorian PGA Championship and qualified for the 2023 European Tour by finishing second in the 2021–22 PGA Tour of Australasia Order of Merit.

== Career ==
Windred finished third at the 2018 AVJennings NSW Open as an amateur, and won the Avondale Amateur back-to-back in 2018 and 2019.

He turned professional in October 2019 and joined the PGA Tour of Australasia, where he made the cut in 9 of his first 10 tournaments. At the 2020 European Tour Q-School, he advanced through to Final Stage to secure playing privileges on the Challenge Tour for 2021, where his best finish was as runner-up at the Challenge de España in June 2021, one stroke behind Santiago Tarrío.

Windred achieved his first professional win in the first event of the 2021–22 PGA Tour of Australasia season, winning the Victorian PGA Championship. He was runner-up at the PGA Classic and runner-up again at the Golf Challenge NSW Open, one stroke behind amateur Harrison Crowe, collecting the A$72,000 winner's cheque. He finished the season second in the Order of Merit, behind only Jediah Morgan, and as one of the top three receive a card for the 2023 European Tour.

In 2022, Windred accepted an invitation to the inaugural tournament of the LIV Golf Invitational Series at Centurion Club in the UK.

== Amateur wins ==
- 2015 Jack Newton Srixon International Junior Classic
- 2018 Avondale Amateur
- 2019 Avondale Amateur

== Professional wins (1) ==
=== PGA Tour of Australasia wins (1) ===
No.	Date	Tournament	Winning score	Margin of victory	Runner-up
1	12 Dec 2021	Victorian PGA Championship	−12 (71-67-69-69=276)	1 stroke	(Australia) Brad Kennedy

== Team appearances ==
Amateur

- Australian Men's Interstate Teams Matches (representing New South Wales): 2016, 2017, 2018, 2019
