= Bob Stanton (golfer) =

Australian professional golfer

Personal information
- Full name: Robert James Stanton
- Nationality: Australia
- Born: 20 January 1946 (age 80) Sydney, Australia

Career
- Sport: Golf
- Status: Professional
- Former tour: PGA Tour
- Professional wins: 8

Best results in major championships
- Masters Tournament: CUT: 1967
- PGA Championship: T22: 1970
- U.S. Open: T22: 1969
- The Open Championship: T27: 1966

Robert James Stanton (born 20 January 1946) is a retired professional golfer from Australia. He had considerable success in the late 1960s, winning a number of tournaments in Australia and playing on the PGA Tour. As a 20-year-old, he won the 1966 Dunlop International, beating Arnold Palmer in a sudden-death playoff. He never won on the PGA Tour but was runner-up twice, in the 1969 AVCO Golf Classic and the 1970 Florida Citrus Invitational. He had a brief return of form in 1974/1975 and again for a few years from 1982.

== Professional career ==
Stanton first came to prominence in 1965. In April, he was a runner-up in the New South Wales Open, a stroke behind Colin McGregor. He bogeyed the final hole, when a par would have put him level with McGregor. In late August, he won the City of Sydney Open, a shot ahead of Frank Phillips. The following week, he had chances in the New South Wales PGA Championship, before finishing 5th behind Kel Nagle. In October, he travelled to South Australia and had more success, finishing runner-up in the West End Tournament and then winning the Adelaide Advertiser Tournament the following week.

In 1966, Stanton travelled to Europe. In July, he qualified for the Open Championship and finished tied for 27th place despite a final round 79. Later in the month, he won the German Open by 5 strokes from Ross Newdick. In late October, Stanton travelled to Florida to play in the PGA Tour Qualifying Tournament. He finished second, with a score of 576 for the 144-hole event, 4 strokes behind Harry Toscano and was one of 32 players to qualify for the 1967 PGA Tour season. Returning to Australia, he won the Dunlop International, beating Arnold Palmer at the second hole of a sudden-death playoff. In January 1967 he won the Tasmanian Open.

Following his win in the Dunlop International, Stanton received an invitation to the Masters Tournament. He scored 78 and 80 and missed the cut. He had modest success in his first season on the PGA Tour, winning US$11,112. He returned to Australia in September 1967 and immediately won the New South Wales PGA Championship. The following month he won the Adelaide Advertiser Tournament, by 9 strokes, and was runner-up behind Kel Nagle in the West End Tournament, while in November he won the Dunlop International for the second successive year, winning by a stroke from Bruce Devlin. In early January 1968, he was runner-up in the New Zealand PGA Championship, before returning to the United States.

His second season in America, 1968, was more successful than the first, with winnings of US$20,550. In August, he was third in the Western Open and tied for fourth in the American Golf Classic the following week, Jack Nicklaus winning both events. 1969 showed further improvement with winnings of US$32,289, helped by a solo runner-up finish in the AVCO Golf Classic, earning US$17,100. Returning to Australia in late 1969, Stanton was runner-up to George Knudson in the Wills Masters. 1970 was to be his most successful season in America with winnings of US$56,213. In March, he finished joint runner-up in the Florida Citrus Invitational, winning US$13,875 and then, three weeks later, solo third in the National Airlines Open Invitational, winning a further US$14,200. At the end of May, Stanton was runner-up in the 1970 Brazil Open.

Stanton had little success in 1971, 1972 or 1973, winning less than US$5,000 on the PGA Tour each season. At the end of 1973, he showed a return to form, losing in a playoff for the Confidence Open, a non-tour event, winning US$5,000. He had a much better year in 1974, winning US$45,215 on the PGA Tour. His best finish was 5th in the World Open Golf Championship winning US$12,300 and he had four other top-10 finishes. He played again on the tour in 1975, winning US$29,737. His best result was to be tied for 6th in the Kemper Open. He had little success in 1976 winning just US$1,675 on the PGA Tour.

Stanton retired from tournament golf in 1976 and became the golf director at the Diamond Head Yacht and Country Club in Bay St. Louis, Mississippi. He returned to competitive golf for a few years from late 1982 and was runner-up, a stroke behind Tom Watson, in the 1984 Australian Open.

== Professional wins (8) ==
=== Australian circuit wins (7) ===
- 1965 City of Sydney Open, Adelaide Advertiser Tournament
- 1966 Dunlop International
- 1967 Tasmanian Open, New South Wales PGA Championship, Adelaide Advertiser Tournament, Dunlop International

=== European circuit wins (1) ===
- 1966 German Open

== Results in major championships ==
Tournament	1966	1967	1968	1969	1970	1971	1972	1973	1974	1975
Masters Tournament		CUT								
U.S. Open		WD		T22	CUT					T49
The Open Championship	T27									
PGA Championship				T73	T22	CUT				T40

Did not play

CUT = missed the half-way cut
WD = Withdrew
"T" = tied

== See also ==
- 1966 PGA Tour Qualifying School graduates
