= 2021–22 PGA Tour of Australasia =

Golf tour season

2021–22 PGA Tour of Australasia season
- Duration: 9 December 2021 – 8 May 2022
- Number of official events: 14 (Note: A further three tournaments were scheduled but were cancelled.)
- Order of Merit: (Australia) Jediah Morgan
- Player of the Year: (Australia) Dimitrios Papadatos

The 2021–22 PGA Tour of Australasia, titled as the 2021–22 ISPS Handa PGA Tour of Australasia for sponsorship reasons, was the 48th season on the PGA Tour of Australasia, the main professional golf tour in Australia and New Zealand since it was formed in 1973.

== European Tour strategic alliance extension ==
In January, it was announced by the European Tour that they had extended their strategic alliance with the PGA Tour of Australasia, which had originally been signed in 2017. As part of the extension, an additional two players (three in total) from the PGA Tour of Australasia Order of Merit were awarded European Tour status for the following season.

== Schedule ==
The following table lists official events during the 2021–22 season.

Date	Tournament	Location	Purse (A$)	Winner (Note: The number in brackets after each winner's name is the number of PGA Tour of Australasia events they had won up to and including that tournament. This information is only shown for PGA Tour of Australasia members.)	OWGR points	Other tours (Note: ASA − Asian Tour; WANZ − WPGA Tour of Australasia.)	Notes
~~28 Nov~~	Australian Open	New South Wales	–	Cancelled	–		
12 Dec; ~~7 Nov~~	Victorian PGA Championship	Victoria	137,500	(Australia) Blake Windred (1)	6		
19 Dec; ~~14 Nov~~	Gippsland Super 6	Victoria	137,500	(Australia) Jack Thompson (1)	6		
16 Jan; ~~5 Dec~~	Fortinet Australian PGA Championship	Queensland	1,000,000	(Australia) Jediah Morgan (1)	32		Flagship event
23 Jan	Queensland PGA Championship	Queensland	200,000	(Australia) Anthony Quayle (2)	6		
6 Feb	TPS Victoria	Victoria	200,000	(Australia) Todd Sinnott (1)	6	WANZ	Mixed event
13 Feb	Vic Open	Victoria	410,000	(Australia) Dimitrios Papadatos (4)	16		
20 Feb	TPS Murray River	New South Wales	200,000	(Australia) Hannah Green (n/a)	6 (Note: OWGR points at the TPS Murray River were awarded based on men's scores only. Andrew Evans and Hayden Hopewell tied for the lowest men's score and split the assigned points for first and second places, each earning 4.8 points.)	WANZ	Mixed event
6 Mar	TPS Sydney	New South Wales	200,000	(Australia) Jarryd Felton (3)	6	WANZ	Mixed event
12 Mar	TPS Hunter Valley	New South Wales	200,000	(Australia) Aaron Pike (2)	6	WANZ	Mixed event
19 Mar	Golf Challenge NSW Open	New South Wales	400,000	(Australia) Harrison Crowe (a) (1)	16		
~~3 Apr~~; ~~27 Feb~~	New Zealand Open	New Zealand	–	Cancelled	–	ASA	
8 Apr	The National PGA Classic	Victoria	200,000	(United States) Derek Ackerman (1)	6		
~~10 Apr~~	NZ PGA Championship	New Zealand	–	Cancelled	–		
24 Apr; ~~28 Nov~~; ~~10 Oct~~	CKB WA PGA Championship	Western Australia	200,000	(Australia) Jay Mackenzie (1)	6		
1 May; ~~5 Dec~~; ~~17 Oct~~	Nexus Advisernet WA Open	Western Australia	150,000	(Australia) Braden Becker (1)	6		
8 May; ~~19 Sep~~; ~~22 Aug~~	Tailor-made Building Services NT PGA Championship	Northern Territory	150,000	(Australia) Austin Bautista (1)	6		

== Order of Merit ==
The Order of Merit was based on prize money won during the season, calculated in Australian dollars. The top three players on the Order of Merit earned status to play on the 2023 European Tour (DP World Tour).

Position	Player	Prize money (A$)	Status earned
1	(Australia) Jediah Morgan	190,409	Promoted to European Tour
2	(Australia) Blake Windred	125,286	Promoted to European Tour
3	(Australia) Andrew Dodt	112,731	Promoted to European Tour
4	(Australia) Dimitrios Papadatos	111,491	
5	(Australia) Aaron Pike	100,981	

== Awards ==
Award	Winner	Ref.
Player of the Year	(Australia) Dimitrios Papadatos	
