= Moore Park Golf Course =

Public golf club Moore Park, Sydney

Moore Park Golf Club
- Interactive map of Moore Park Golf Club
- 33°47′15″S 151°16′37″E

Club information
- Location: Moore Park, New South Wales
- Established: 19 June 1926; 100 years ago
- Type: public
- Owner: Centennial Park & Moore Park Trust
- Total holes: Eighteen
- Tournaments: City of Sydney Open and New South Wales Open
- Website: www.mooreparkgolf.com.au
- Designed by: Carnegie Clark (1926)

Moore Park Golf Course is a 18-hole public golf club and driving range in Moore Park, New South Wales, Australia.

Mount Rennie is the heritage-listed Moore Park Golf House that was opened on 19 June 1926. The Golf House is a two-storey brick building with tiled roof and features a restaurant and bar with views of the golf course and a 150-seat function centre with views towards the city of Sydney.

== Recent developments ==
In 2023, City of Sydney lord mayor Clover Moore proposed cutting Moore Park Golf Course from 18 holes to nine, in order to create a new park, which drew criticism from golfers, who suggested that it was her self-interest which drove the proposal, as Moore lives nearby. The state government threw their support behind the proposal soon after.

In the 2024–2025 New South Wales budget, the state government allocated $2.6 million for works to turn most of the northern part of the golf course to public open space. The government has allocated an extra $50 million.

Plans were released on 28 October 2025 detailing what the park could look like after it has been cut and re-purposed. In total these works would cost $50 million.

== See also ==
- List of golf courses in New South Wales
