= Festival of Sydney Open =

The Caltex Festival of Sydney Open was a professional golf tournament held in 1978 at The Lakes Golf Club in Sydney, New South Wales, Australia. It was a PGA Tour of Australia event with prize money of A$20,000. The event was part of the 1978 Festival of Sydney.

== History ==
Greg Norman beat Ian Stanley by three strokes after a final round 64, with Jack Newton a further shot behind. Stanley had started the last round with a three stroke lead, with Norman a further three strokes behind, but scored 73.

== Winners ==
Year	Winner	Country	Score	To par	Margin of victory	Runner-up	Ref
1978	Greg Norman	Australia	278	−14	3 strokes	(Australia) Ian Stanley	
