= Leigh McKechnie =

Australian professional golfer

Personal information
- Nationality: Australia
- Born: 11 November 1973 (age 53) Newcastle, Australia
- Height: 1.75 m (5 ft 9 in)
- Weight: 95 kg (209 lb; 15.0 st)

Career
- Sport: Golf
- Turned professional: 1997
- Current tour: PGA Tour of Australasia
- Professional wins: 1

Number of wins by tour
- PGA Tour of Australasia: 1

Leigh McKechnie (born 11 November 1973) is an Australian professional golfer on the PGA Tour of Australasia.

== Career ==
McKechnie was born in Newcastle, New South Wales. He took up golf at the age of 13 being introduced by his father.

In November 2009, McKechnie won the New South Wales Open at the Vintage Golf Course in the Hunter Valley. He also lost in a playoff at the 2002 NSW Masters.

== Professional wins (1) ==
=== PGA Tour of Australasia wins (1) ===
| No. | Date | Tournament | Winning score | Margin of victory | Runner-up |
|---|---|---|---|---|---|
| 1 | 29 Nov 2009 | NSW Open | −3 (70-72-70-69=281) | 1 stroke | (Australia) James Nitties |

PGA Tour of Australasia playoff record (0–1)

| No. | Year | Tournament | Opponent | Result |
|---|---|---|---|---|
| 1 | 2002 | NSW Masters | (Australia) Steve Collins | Lost to birdie on first extra hole |
