= Royal Canberra Golf Club =

Golf club in Yarralumla, Australia

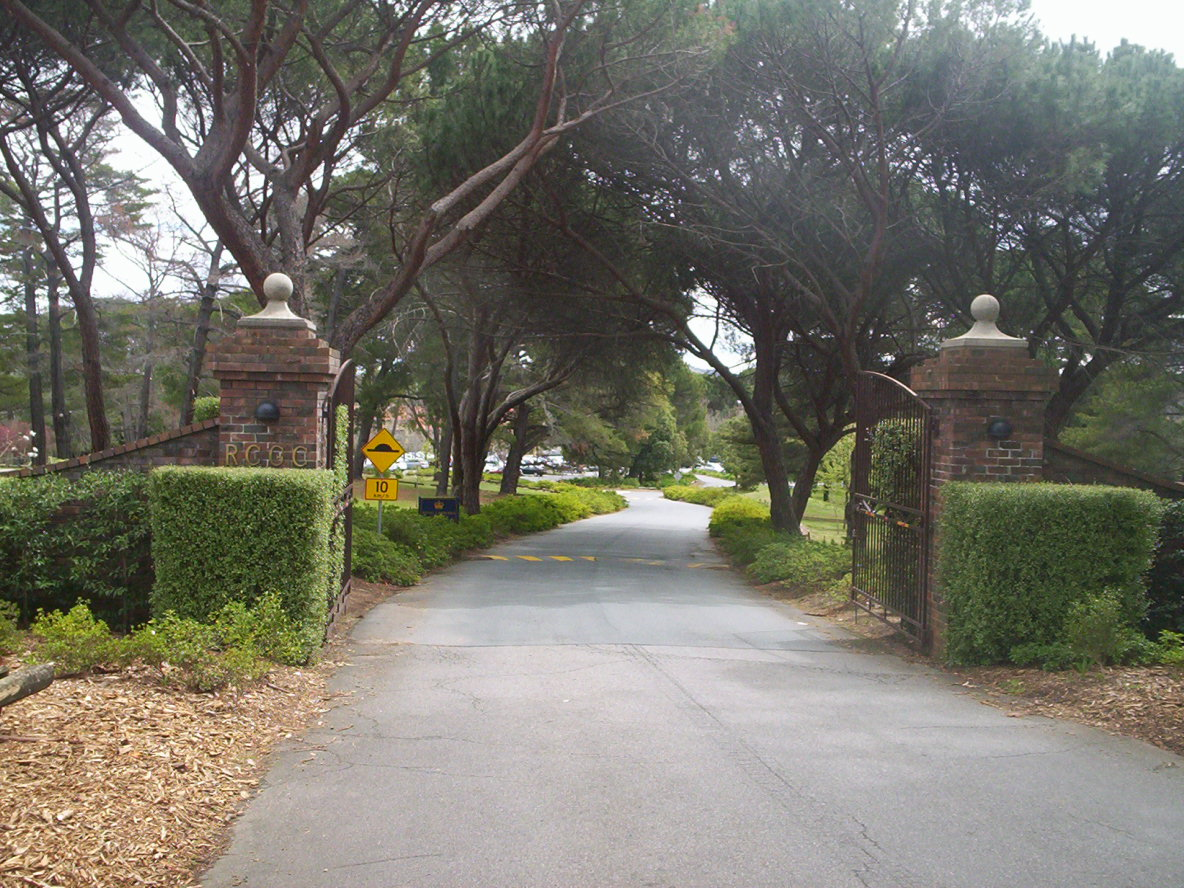
- Entrance to the RCGC in 2005
- Interactive map of Royal Canberra Golf Club
- 35.304°S 149.09°E

Club information
- Location: Bentham St; Yarralumla 2600; Australian Capital Territory, Australia
- Established: 1926; 100 years ago
- Tota holes: 27
- Tournaments: Women's Australian Open (2013)
- Length: 5,891 m (6,442 yd)

The Canberra Golf Club, later known as the Royal Canberra Golf Club, was formed in 1926. Its original grounds were behind the Hotel Canberra on the river flats on both sides of the Molonglo River.

== History ==
The club's Club House was on a site near the Albert Hall and included the old brick fireplace and chimney of the nearby Kaye family's slab cottage. The Kaye family took over the lease of Klensendorlffe's stone villa in 1854 and in the early 1890s constructed a new slab home with the brick fireplace and chimney mentioned above. The site of this building, like the greens, is below the waters of Lake Burley Griffin.

Shortly before work commenced on the lake (early 1960s) the Royal Canberra Golf Club moved to its present site in Yarralumla.

The history of Royal Canberra Golf Club, or its predecessors, is almost as long as the history of the national capital itself.

The foundation stone for the city was laid in 1913 and in that same year, a few golfing enthusiasts established a nine-hole course on a site near to, what is now the city centre. Subsequently, in 1922, those stalwarts domiciled themselves on a new nine hole, sand green layout at Acton, sharing space with the Acton racecourse and leading to problem lies through omni-present hoof marks on the fairways. In 1926, the Federal Capital Commission constructed a new golf course on an adjacent site at Acton, where the Canberra Golf Club had its first real home. That Acton course was built on the banks of the Molonglo River and, with the river as a constant threat to wayward shots, soon earned a reputation as a superb and challenging test of golf. With minor changes only to the layout, but major changes to the clubhouse, it remained the home of Royal Canberra Golf Club until 1962, the "Royal" status having been granted by King George V in 1933.

The Walter Burley Griffin plan for Canberra called for the damming of the Molonglo River to form a lake and so it was that, in 1962, with its Acton site due to be submerged in that plan, the Club moved to its present site at Westbourne Woods. In the 40 years since that move the Royal Canberra Golf Club has developed into one of Australia's pre-eminent inland golf courses.

Canberra native and future professional golfer David Galloway began his career at Royal Canberra. Galloway honed his skills at the club and won a number of junior championships there. As of early 1969 he was a club professional at Royal Canberra.

Royal Canberra hosted the 2013 ISPS Handa Women's Australian Open. The length of the course was increased from 5,891 metres to over 6,000 metres.

== Tournaments hosted ==
- 2013 Women's Australian Open
- 1988 Australian Amateur
- 1988 ESP Open
- 1970 Dunlop International
- 1969 Australian PGA Championship
- 1967 Dunlop International

== See also ==
- List of golf clubs granted Royal status
- List of Australian organisations with royal patronage
