= List of golf courses designed by Greg Norman =

This is a partial list of golf courses for the design of which Australian golf course architect Greg Norman was at least in part responsible. The list is sorted by country, and then course. An up to date list can be found via the Greg Norman Golf Course Design database:

- OD denotes courses for which Norman is the original designer
- R denotes courses reconstructed by Norman
- A denotes courses for which Norman made substantial additions
- E denotes courses that Norman examined and on the construction of which he consulted

Name	Contribution	Year built	City / Town	State / Province	Country	Comments
Course at Wente Vineyards	OD		Livermore	California	United States	
PGA West (Greg Norman Course)	OD		La Quinta	California	United States	
Vellano CC	OD		Chino Hills	California	United States	Extinct (May 2018)
Cornerstone Club	OD	2008	Montrose	Colorado	United States	
Red Sky GC	OD		Vail	Colorado	United States	
ChampionsGate GC (National Course, International Course)	OD		Citrus Ridge	Florida	United States	ChampionsGate neighborhood
Jupiter CC	OD		Jupiter	Florida	United States	
Medalist GC	OD		Hobe Sound	Florida	United States	
Medalist Short Course	OD		Hobe Sound	Florida	United States	
Parkland G&CC	OD		Parkland	Florida	United States	
Pompano Beach Municipal GC	OD		Pompano Beach	Florida	United States	
Ritz-Carlton GC - Grande Lakes	OD		Orlando	Florida	United States	
Shark's Tooth GC	OD		Panama City Beach	Florida	United States	
Talis Park GC	OD		Naples	Florida	United States	
Tiburón GC (Gold Course, Black Course)	OD		Naples	Florida	United States	
Savannah Quarters CC	OD		Pooler	Georgia	United States	
The River Club	OD		Suwanee	Georgia	United States	
TPC Sugarloaf (The Pines)	OD	2000	Duluth	Georgia	United States	9-hole course
TPC Sugarloaf (The Stables, The Meadows)	OD	1997	Duluth	Georgia	United States	Both are 9-hole courses
The Experience at Koele	OD		Lana‘i City	Hawaii	United States	
Royal Melbourne CC	OD		Long Grove	Illinois	United States	
Stone Canyon GC	OD		Independence	Missouri	United States	
Trump National GC - Charlotte	OD		Mooresville	North Carolina	United States	
Elks Run GC	OD		Batavia	Ohio	United States	
Barefoot Resort	OD		North Myrtle Beach	South Carolina	United States	
Oldfield	OD		Okatie	South Carolina	United States	
The Reserve GC	OD		Pawleys Island	South Carolina	United States	
Tennessee National GC	OD		Loudon	Tennessee	United States	
The Grove	OD		College Grove	Tennessee	United States	
Meadowbrook Farms GC	OD		Katy	Texas	United States	
TPC San Antonio (AT&T Oaks Course)	OD		San Antonio	Texas	United States	
Norman Course at Lansdowne Resort	OD		Leesburg	Virginia	United States	
Sharkbite at Lansdowne Resort	OD		Lansdowne	Virginia	United States	
El Desafío Mountain Resort	OD		San Martín de los Andes	Neuquén	Argentina	
Cathedral Lodge	OD		Melbourne	Victoria	Australia	
Copperclub at The Dunes Port Hughes	OD		Adelaide	South Australia	Australia	
Ellerston GC	OD		Ellerston	New South Wales	Australia	
New South Wales GC	R/A/E		Sydney	New South Wales	Australia	
Pelican Waters GC	OD		Pelican Waters	Queensland	Australia	
Sanctuary Lakes GC	OD		Point Cook	Victoria	Australia	
Settlers Run G&CC	OD		Botanic Ridge	Victoria	Australia	
Stonecutters Ridge GC	OD		Colebee	New South Wales	Australia	
The Brookwater G&CC	OD		Brookwater	Queensland	Australia	
The Eastern GC	OD		Yarra Valley	Victoria	Australia	
The Glades GC	OD		Robina	Queensland	Australia	
The Grand GC	OD		Nerang	Queensland	Australia	
The Grange GC (East)	OD		Grange	South Australia	Australia	
The National Moonah Course	OD		Melbourne	Victoria	Australia	
The Vintage GC	OD		Rothbury	New South Wales	Australia	located in the Hunter Region
Sandals Emerald Bay GC	OD		Great Exuma		Bahamas	
Aurora International	OD		Anguilla	British West Indies	Anguilla	
Wyndance GC	OD		Uxbridge	Ontario	Canada	
Ritz-Carlton GC - Grand Cayman (Blue Tip)	OD			Grand Cayman	Cayman Islands	
Kai Kou GC	OD		Xiamen	Fujian	China	
Mission Hills GC (Norman Course)	OD		Shenzhen	Guangdong	China	
Tianjin GC	OD		Tianjin		China	currently named The 27 Club
Zhuhai Lakewood GC	OD		Zhuhai	Guangdong	China	
Mar de Indias GC	OD		Cartagena	Bolívar	Colombia	
The Allegria GC	OD		Sheikh Zayed City	Cairo	Egypt	
Jaypee Greens	OD		Greater Noida	Uttar Pradesh	India	
Lodha Belmondo GC	OD		Pune	Maharashtra	India	9-holes Par-3
Laguna Bintan GC	OD		Bintan Island	Riau Islands	Indonesia	
Nirwana Bali GC	OD		Tanah Lot	Bali	Indonesia	
Riverside GC	OD		Bogor	West Java	Indonesia	
Tering Bay G&CC	OD		Batam	Riau Islands	Indonesia	
Doonbeg GC	OD	2002	Doonbeg	Munster	Ireland	currently named Trump International Golf Links and Hotel Ireland
Shirasagi GC	OD		Himeji	Hyogo Prefecture	Japan	
Ayla Oasis	OD		Aqaba	Aqaba Governorate	Jordan	
Lao Lao Bay Resort (East Course, West Course)	OD		Saipan	Mariana Islands	Northern Mariana Islands	
El Camaleón Mayakoba GC	OD		Playa del Carmen	Quintana Roo	Mexico	
Litibu GC	OD		Punta Mita	Nayarit	Mexico	
Playa Mujeres GC	R		Cancún	Quintana Roo	Mexico	
Puerto Los Cabos GC (Mission Course)	OD		Cabo San Lucas	Baja California Sur	Mexico	Greg Norman Signature 9 holes
Punta Tiburón Residencial Marina & Golf	OD		Boca del Río	Veracruz	Mexico	
Solmar Golf Links	OD		Cabo San Lucas	Baja California Sur	Mexico	
The Norman Signature GC at Vidanta Nuevo Vallarta	OD		Nuevo Vallarta	Nayarit	Mexico	
The Wave (Al Mouj Golf)	OD		Muscat	Muscat Governorate	Oman	
Splendido Taal CC	OD		Batangas City	Batangas	Philippines	
The River Course	OD		Río Grande		Puerto Rico	
Eye of Africa	OD		Johannesburg	Gauteng	South Africa	
Jade Palace GC	OD		Chuncheon	Gangwon	South Korea	
Lumine GC (Centre Course, North Course)	OD		Tarragona	Province of Tarragona	Spain	
Real El Prat GC	OD		Barcelona	Province of Barcelona	Spain	
Thana City CC	OD		Bang Chalong	Samut Prakan	Thailand	
Eco-Signature at Jumeirah Golf Estates (Earth Course, Fire Course)	OD		Dubai	Emirate of Dubai	United Arab Emirates	
Danang GC	OD		Danang	Hải Châu	Vietnam	
KN Golf Links Cam Ranh	OD		Nha Trang	Khánh Hòa	Vietnam	
The Bluffs	OD		Vung Tàu	Bà Rịa–Vũng Tàu	Vietnam	
