= South Seas Classic =

Golf tournament

The South Seas Classic was a professional golf tournament played at Pacific Harbour Golf & Country Club in Fiji from 1976 to 1979. Prize money was A$27,500 in 1976, A$30,000 in 1977 and 1978, and A$43,000 in 1979.

== Winners ==
Year	Winner	Country	Score	To par	Margin of victory	Runner(s)-up	Ref
South Seas Classic
1979	Rick Mallicoat	United States	285	−3	1 stroke	(Australia) Mike Ferguson (Australia) Wayne Grady	
Gilbey's Gin South Seas Classic
1978	Greg Norman	Australia	288	E	Playoff	(United States) Sandy Galbraith	
1977	Bill Brask	United States	275	−13	5 strokes	(England) Guy Wolstenholme	
South Seas Classic
1976	Ian Stanley	Australia	288	E	Playoff	(United States) Mark Lye (United States) Art Russell	
