= 1993 Open Championship =

Tournament information
- Dates: 15–18 July 1993
- Location: Sandwich, England; 51.274°N 1.367°E
- Course: Royal St George's Golf Club
- Tours: European Tour; PGA Tour

Statistics
- Par: 70
- Length: 6,860 yards (6,273 m)
- Field: 156 players, 78 after cut
- Cut: 143 (+3)
- Prize fund: £1,000,000 €1,422,960 $1,540,000
- Winner's share: £100,000 €140,000 $154,000

Champion
- (Australia) Greg Norman
- 267 (−13)

Location map
- Location in the United Kingdom Location in England Location in Kent

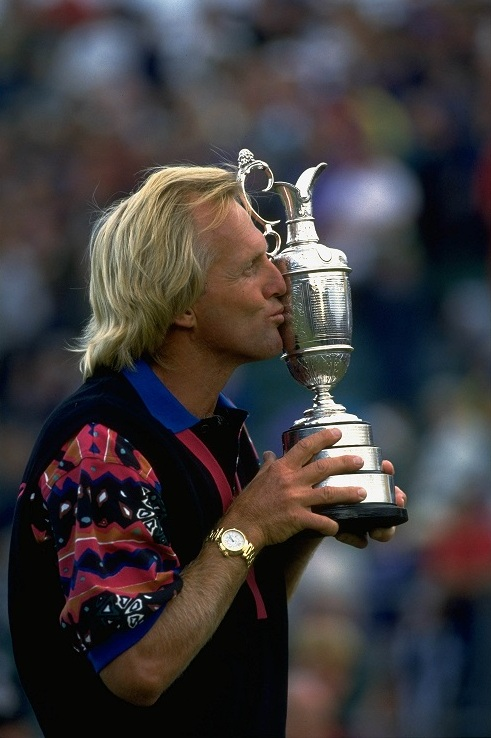
Greg Norman at Royal St George's in 1993, his second Open win

The 1993 Open Championship was a men's major golf championship and the 122nd Open Championship, held from 15 to 18 July at Royal St George's Golf Club in Sandwich, England. Greg Norman shot a final round 64 (−6) to win his second Open Championship, two strokes ahead of runner-up Nick Faldo.

== Course layout ==
Royal St George's Golf Club

Hole	1	2	3	4	5	6	7	8	9	Out	10	11	12	13	14	15	16	17	18	In	Total
Yards	441	376	210	468	421	155	530	418	389	3,408	399	216	365	443	507	466	163	425	468	3,452	6,860
Par	4	4	3	4	4	3	5	4	4	35	4	3	4	4	5	4	3	4	4	35	70

Lengths of the course for previous Opens (since 1950):

- 1985: 6,857 yards (6,270 m), par 70
- 1981: 6,827 yards (6,243 m), par 70

== Round summaries ==
=== First round ===
Thursday, 15 July 1993

Place	Player	Score	To par
T1	(United States) Mark Calcavecchia	66	−4
T1	(Australia) Greg Norman	66	−4
T1	(Australia) Peter Senior	66	−4
T1	(United States) Fuzzy Zoeller	66	−4
T5	(Trinidad and Tobago) Stephen Ames	67	−3
T5	(England) Howard Clark	67	−3
T5	(United States) Glen Day	67	−3
T5	(England) Gary Evans	67	−3
T5	(Germany) Bernhard Langer	67	−3
T5	(Zimbabwe) Mark McNulty	67	−3
T5	(United States) Larry Mize	67	−3
T5	(Republic of Ireland) Des Smyth	67	−3
T5	(New Zealand) Greg Turner	67	−3
T5	(South Africa) Wayne Westner	67	−3

=== Second round ===
Friday, 16 July 1993

Place	Player	Score	To par
1	(England) Nick Faldo	69-63=132	−8
2	(Germany) Bernhard Langer	67-66=133	−7
T3	(United States) Fred Couples	68-66=134	−6
T3	(Australia) Greg Norman	66-68=134	−6
T3	(United States) Corey Pavin	68-66=134	−6
6	(Australia) Peter Senior	66-69=135	−5
T7	(United States) Larry Mize	67-69=136	−4
T7	(United States) Fuzzy Zoeller	66-70=136	−4
T9	(England) Peter Baker	70-67=137	−3
T9	(United States) John Daly	71-66=137	−3
T9	(South Africa) Ernie Els	68-69=137	−3

Amateurs: Pyman (E), Leonard (+8), Welch (+8), Dundas (+13), Voges (+15), Griffiths (+18).

=== Third round ===
Saturday, 17 July 1993

Place	Player	Score	To par
T1	(England) Nick Faldo	69-63-70=202	−8
T1	(United States) Corey Pavin	68-66-68=202	−8
T3	(Australia) Greg Norman	66-68-69=203	−7
T3	(Germany) Bernhard Langer	67-66-70=203	−7
T5	(Zimbabwe) Nick Price	68-70-67=205	−5
T5	(Australia) Peter Senior	66-69-70=205	−5
T7	(Australia) Wayne Grady	74-68-64=206	−4
T7	(South Africa) Ernie Els	68-69-69=206	−4
T7	(United States) Fred Couples	68-66-72=206	−4
T10	(United States) John Daly	71-66-70=207	−3
T10	(United States) Fuzzy Zoeller	70-66-71=207	−3

=== Final round ===
Sunday, 18 July 1993

Place	Player	Score	To par	Money (£)
1	(Australia) Greg Norman	66-68-69-64=267	−13	100,000
2	(England) Nick Faldo	69-63-70-67=269	−11	80,000
3	(Germany) Bernhard Langer	67-66-70-67=270	−10	67,000
T4	(United States) Corey Pavin	68-66-68-70=272	−8	50,500
T4	(Australia) Peter Senior	66-69-70-67=272	−8	50,500
T6	(South Africa) Ernie Els	68-69-69-68=274	−6	33,167
T6	(Scotland) Paul Lawrie	72-68-69-65=274	−6	33,167
T6	(Zimbabwe) Nick Price	68-70-67-69=274	−6	33,167
T9	(United States) Fred Couples	68-66-72-69=275	−5	25,500
T9	(Australia) Wayne Grady	74-68-64-69=275	−5	25,500
T9	(United States) Scott Simpson	68-70-71-66=275	−5	25,500

Amateurs: Pyman (+1)
