= Fall 1975 PGA Tour Qualifying School graduates =

This is a list of the Fall 1975 PGA Tour Qualifying School graduates. The event was held at three courses at the Walt Disney World Resort: Magnolia Golf Course, Palm Golf Course, and Cypress Creek Golf Club. 375 players made the finals.

== Tournament summary ==
Two significant international players were in the event. They were Dale Hayes, "a highly regarded players from Pretoria, South Africa," and England's Maurice Bembridge. Hayes opened, well with a 69 (−3), to put himself two back of the lead. Bembridge, however, struggled in the first round with a 76 (+4). Overall, Bobby Stroble and Andy Bean held the joint first round lead at 67 (−5). After the second round, it was Jerry Pate and Sandy Galbraith that were tied for the lead at 139 (−5). Pate went on to earn medallist honors. Among the first round leaders, both Strobble and Bean easily qualified, both finishing in the top ten. Among the international players, Hayes qualified for the tour while Bembridge did not. Meanwhile, Galbraith, the joint leader with Pate after the second round, also qualified.

Jim Thorpe also earned playing privileges on the PGA Tour for the first time. In addition, Bill Mallon, a recent graduate of Duke University, also earned playing privileges. Shortly after he graduated he told The Boston Globe, "I am a touring professional golfer. I did it. Achieved a lifelong dream. I've wanted to be a professional golfer for a long time. I know a lot of good young players who were 15 or 16 and they said this is want they wanted. They want to be a pro when they see Nicklaus or Palmer on TV. Well I said it. And now I've done it. I've got a long way to go to do what I want to do yet. But this is the first step."

== List of graduates ==
| # | Player | Notes |
|---|---|---|
| 1 | (United States) Jerry Pate | Winner of 1974 U.S. Amateur |
| 2 | (United States) George Burns | 2 European Tour wins |
| T3 | (United States) Earl Humphries | |
| | (United States) Gary Koch | Winner of 1970 U.S. Junior Amateur |
| T5 | (United States) Bobby Stroble | |
| | (United States) Steve Veriato | |
| 7 | (United States) Andy Bean | Winner of 1974 Eastern Amateur |
| T8 | (United States) Stan Lee | |
| | (United States) Bob Gilder | 1 PGA Tour of Australasia win |
| 10 | (United States) Don Pooley | |
| T11 | (South Africa) Dale Hayes | 1 European Tour win. 7 South African Tour wins. |
| | (United States) John Harris | |
| | (United States) Tom McGinnis | |
| 14 | (United States) Ray Leach | |
| 15 | (United States) David Smith | |
| T16 | (United States) Bill Mallon | |
| | (United States) Jim Thorpe | |
| | (United States) John Melnick | |
| | (United States) Ted Goin | |
| | (United States) Sandy Galbraith | |
| T21 | (United States) Mark Pfeil | Winner of 1972 Pacific Coast Amateur |
| | (Canada) Gar Hamilton | |
| | (United States) Stan Altgelt | |
| | (United States) Guy Cullins | |
| | (United States) David Canipe | |
