= Women's Australian Open =

Golf tournament played in Australia

Coordinates: 37.954°S 145.081°E

Tournament information
- Location: Australia, varies Adelaide in 2026
- Established: 1974, 52 years ago
- Course: Kooyonga Golf Club
- Tours: WPGA Tour of Australasia; Ladies European Tour
- Format: Stroke play - 72 holes
- Prize fund: A$1,700,000
- Month played: March

Tournament record score
- Aggregate: 270 Karrie Webb (2000)
- To par: −22 Karrie Webb (2000)

Current champion
- (Australia) Hannah Green

Location map
- Location in Australia Location in South Australia

The Women's Australian Open is a women's professional golf tournament played in Australia, operated by Golf Australia and the WPGA Tour of Australasia, long co-sanctioned by the Ladies European Tour (LET). Beginning with the 2012 event, it was also co-sanctioned by the U.S.-based LPGA Tour. In 2008, it was the second-richest women's golf tournament on the ALPG Tour, with a prize fund of A$500,000, and was raised to A$600,000 in 2010. With the co-sanctioning by the LPGA, the total purse was nearly doubled, and was also fixed in U.S. dollars. The purse was US$1.1 million in 2012, and increased again to its current level of US$1.2 million for 2013. Since 2011, the tournament's name has been the ISPS Handa Women's Australian Open.

The Australian Ladies Open was founded in 1974 as a 54-hole event, but folded after 1978. It was resurrected in 1994 as the Women's Australian Open, this time as a 72-hole event. Annika Sörenstam won that year, which was her first professional win. It was also Karrie Webb's professional debut, and she would later win the event five times. Starting in 2000, the Ladies European Tour began co-sanctioning the tournament. Following the 2004 event, sponsorship difficulties caused the tournament to stop once again, but after a two-year hiatus the tournament returned in 2007. The Women's Australian Open usually moves between various courses around Australia, except from 1995 through 2002 when it was held at the Yarra Yarra Golf Club in Melbourne. The 2008 event was held at Kingston Heath Golf Club.

For several years after its return in 1994, the Women's Australian Open was played early in the ALPG schedule, usually in November. Starting in 2000, it was changed to be played at the end of the schedule in February near the ANZ Ladies Masters, to allow both tournaments to be part of the Ladies European Tour. Since the Women's Australian Open was played from 12 to 15 November 1998 during the 1998/1999 ALPG season, it was therefore not played during the 1999 calendar year.

The 2012 tournament was played at the Composite Course at Royal Melbourne, the championship course comprising 12 holes from the West course and six from the East course. The Composite Course is considered one of the top courses in the world, and was used for the Presidents Cup competitions in 1998 and 2011. Through 2011, a women's professional competition had never been held on it; the 2012 Women's Australian Open was the first. The event was won by Jessica Korda after an historic six-player playoff, only the second in ALPG history. Korda holed a 25-foot (8 m) birdie putt on the second playoff hole to claim her first LPGA Tour victory.

In 2013, the tournament moved to Royal Canberra Golf Club, and in 2014 to the Victoria Golf Club near Melbourne. In 2016 the event moved to Adelaide and was played there until 2020. In 2021, it was not played due to the COVID-19 pandemic.

In 2022, the tournament was played at Victoria Golf Club and Kingston Heath Golf Club. In a world-first for golf, the ISPS Handa Australian Open brought together the national men's and women's Open events, along with the All Abilities Championship. The men's Open and the women's Open had equal prize money of A$1,700,000 as the Open returned to Melbourne for the first time in several years. In 2022, the event fell during the LPGA's off-season and during the tour's final stage of qualifying school and therefore co-sanctioning the event with the LPGA was not possible.

== Tournament names ==
- 1974: Wills Australian Ladies Open
- 1975–1978: Wills Qantas Australian Ladies Open
- 1994–1996: Holden Women's Australian Open
- 1997: Toyota Women's Australian Open
- 1998–2004: AAMI Women's Australian Open
- 2007–20: MFS Women's Australian Open
- 2009: Women's Australian Open
- 2010: Handa Women's Australian Open
- 2011–2024: ISPS Handa Women's Australian Open
- 2026: Women's Australian Open

== Winners ==
| Year | Tour(s) (Note: ALPG − ALPG Tour; LET − Ladies European Tour; LPGA − LPGA Tour; WPGA – WPGA Tour of Australasia.) | Champion | Country | Score (Note: ^{PO} – Won after playoff) | Venue(s) | Purse | Winner's share |
|---|---|---|---|---|---|---|---|
| 2026 | WPGA; LET | Hannah Green | Australia | 277 (−11) | Kooyonga | A$1,700,000 | A$255,000 |
| 2025 | Tournament moved from November (2024) to March (2026) | | | | | | |
| 2024 | WPGA | Jiyai Shin (2) | South Korea | 274 (−17) | Kingston Heath & Victoria | A$1,700,000 | A$270,000 |
| 2023 | WPGA | Ashleigh Buhai (2) | South Africa | 280 (−9) | The Australian & The Lakes | A$1,700,000 | A$270,000 |
| 2022 | WPGA | Ashleigh Buhai | South Africa | 277 (−12) | Kingston Heath & Victoria | A$1,700,000 | A$270,000 |
| 2021 | ALPG | Cancelled due to the COVID-19 pandemic | | | | | |
| 2020 | ALPG; LPGA | Inbee Park | South Korea | 278 (−14) | Royal Adelaide | US$1,300,000 | US$195,000 |
| 2019 | ALPG; LPGA | Nelly Korda | United States | 271 (−17) | The Grange | 1,300,000 | 195,000 |
| 2018 | ALPG; LPGA | Ko Jin-young | South Korea | 274 (−14) | Kooyonga | 1,300,000 | 195,000 |
| 2017 | ALPG; LPGA | Jang Ha-na | South Korea | 282 (−10) | Royal Adelaide | 1,300,000 | 195,000 |
| 2016 | ALPG; LET; LPGA | Haru Nomura | Japan | 272 (−16) | The Grange | 1,300,000 | 195,000 |
| 2015 | ALPG; LET; LPGA | Lydia Ko | New Zealand | 283 (−9) | Royal Melbourne | 1,200,000 | 180,000 |
| 2014 | ALPG; LET; LPGA | Karrie Webb (5) | Australia | 276 (−12) | Victoria | 1,200,000 | 180,000 |
| 2013 | ALPG; LET; LPGA | Jiyai Shin | South Korea | 274 (−18) | Royal Canberra | 1,200,000 | 180,000 |
| 2012 | ALPG; LET; LPGA | Jessica Korda | United States | 289 (−3)^{PO} | Royal Melbourne | 1,100,000 | 165,000 |
| 2011 | ALPG; LET | Yani Tseng (2) | Taiwan | 276 (−16) | Commonwealth | A$600,000 | A$90,000 |
| 2010 | ALPG; LET | Yani Tseng (1) | Taiwan | 283 (−9) | Commonwealth | 600,000 | 90,000 |
| 2009 | ALPG; LET | Laura Davies (2) | England | 285 (−7) | Metropolitan | 500,000 | 75,000 |
| 2008 | ALPG; LET | Karrie Webb (4) | Australia | 284 (−8)^{PO} | Kingston Heath | 500,000 | 75,000 |
| 2007 | ALPG; LET | Karrie Webb (3) | Australia | 278 (−10) | Royal Sydney | 500,000 | 75,000 |
2005–06: Not played
| 2004 | ALPG; LET | Laura Davies (1) | England | 283 (−5) | Concord | 550,000 | 82,500 |
| 2003 | ALPG; LET | Mhairi McKay | Scotland | 277 (−11) | Terrey Hills | 500,000 | 75,000 |
| 2002 | ALPG; LET | Karrie Webb (2) | Australia | 278 (−10)^{PO} | Yarra Yarra | 500,000 | 75,000 |
| 2001 | ALPG; LET | Sophie Gustafson | Sweden | 276 (−12) | Yarra Yarra | 400,000 | 60,000 |
| 2000 | ALPG; LET | Karrie Webb (1) | Australia | 270 (−22) | Yarra Yarra | 350,000 | 52,500 |
| 1999 | Tournament moved from November (1998) to February (2000) | | | | | | |
| 1998 | ALPG | Marnie McGuire | New Zealand | 280 (−12) | Yarra Yarra | 350,000 | 52,500 |
| 1997 | ALPG | Jane Crafter | Australia | 279 (−13) | Yarra Yarra | 350,000 | 52,500 |
| 1996 | ALPG | Catriona Matthew | Scotland | 283 (−9) | Yarra Yarra | 300,000 | 45,000 |
| 1995 | ALPG | Liselotte Neumann | Sweden | 283 (−9)^{PO} | Yarra Yarra | 250,000 | 37,500 |
| 1994 | ALPG | Annika Sörenstam | Sweden | 286 (−10) | Royal Adelaide | 200,000 | 30,000 |
1979–93: Not played
| 1978 | ALPG | Debbie Austin | United States | 213 | Manly | 15,000 | |
| 1977 | ALPG | Jan Stephenson | Australia | 145 (Note: Tournament shortened to 36 holes due to rain) | Manly | 15,000 | |
| 1976 | ALPG | Donna Caponi Young | United States | 206 | Victoria | 15,000 | |
| 1975 | ALPG | JoAnne Carner | United States | 228 | The Australian | 15,000 | |
| 1974 | ALPG | Chako Higuchi | Japan | 219 | Victoria | 10,000 | |

== Course record ==
| Year | Course | Player | Score | To par |
|---|---|---|---|---|
| 2016 | Grange Golf Club | SooBin Kim | 63 | −9 |

== See also ==
- Australian Women's Amateur
- Australian Girls' Amateur
- Australian Open
