= Greg Norman =

Australian professional golfer (born 1955)

Greg Norman AO
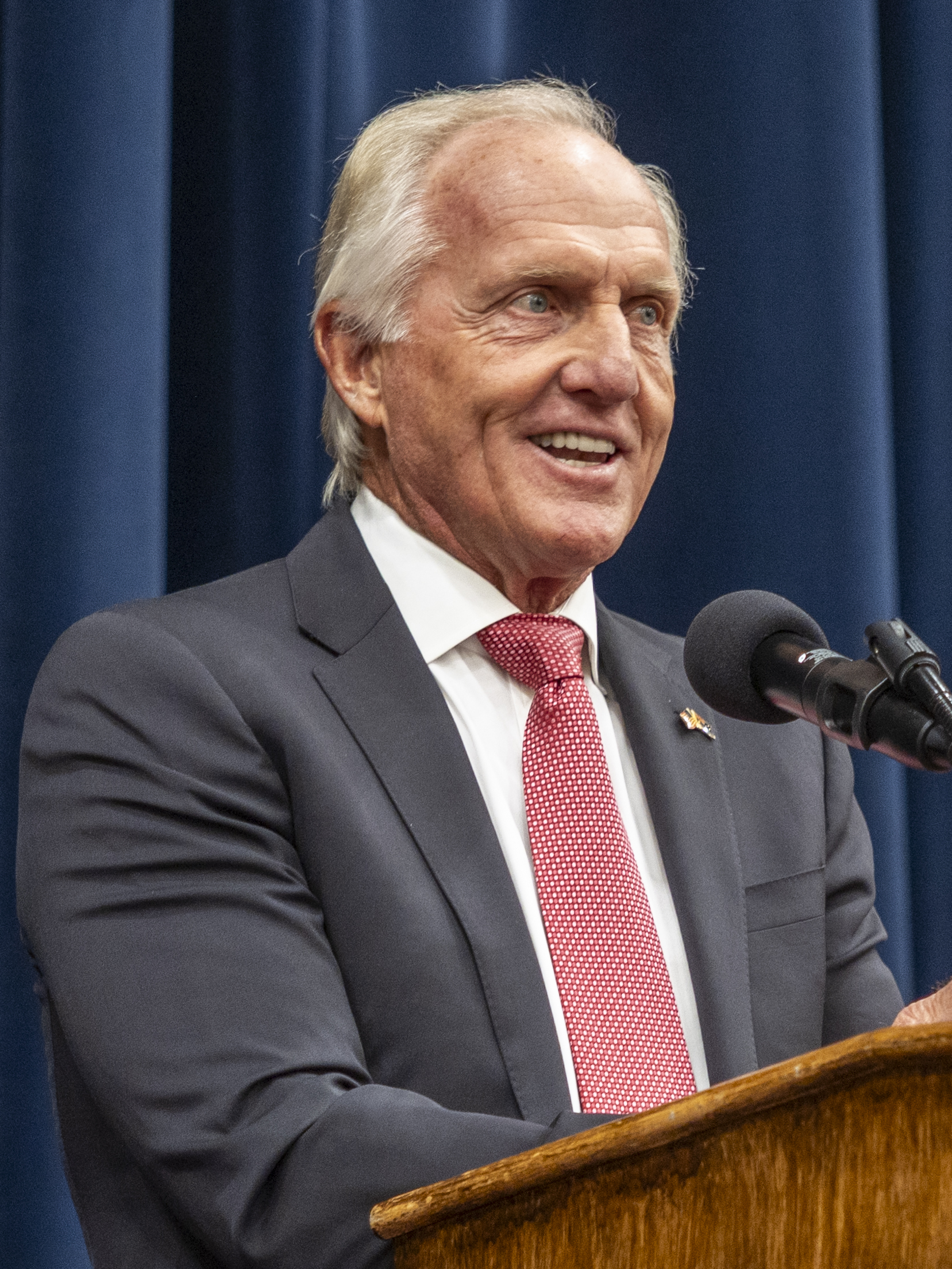
- Norman in 2025

Personal information
- Full name: Gregory John Norman
- Nickname: The (Great White) Shark
- Nationality: Australia
- Born: 10 February 1955 (age 71) Mount Isa, Queensland, Australia
- Height: 6 ft 0 in (183 cm)
- Weight: 180 lb (82 kg)
- Spouses: Laura Andrassy (m. 1981; div. 2007) Chris Evert (m. 2008; div. 2009) Kirsten Kutner (m. 2010)
- Children: 2

Career
- Sport: Golf
- Turned professional: 1976
- Former tours: PGA Tour of Australasia; PGA Tour; European Tour; Champions Tour
- Professional wins: 88
- Highest ranking: 1 (14 September 1986) (331 weeks)

Number of wins by tour
- PGA Tour: 20
- European Tour: 14
- Japan Golf Tour: 2
- PGA Tour of Australasia: 33
- Other: 21

Best results in major championships (wins: 2)
- Masters Tournament: 2nd/T2: 1986, 1987, 1996
- PGA Championship: 2nd: 1986, 1993
- U.S. Open: 2nd: 1984, 1995
- The Open Championship: Won: 1986, 1993

Achievements and awards
- World Golf Hall of Fame: 2001 (member page)
- PGA Tour of Australia Order of Merit winner: 1978, 1980, 1983, 1984, 1986, 1988
- European Tour official money list winner: 1982
- PGA Tour money list winner: 1986, 1990, 1995
- Byron Nelson Award: 1988, 1990, 1993, 1994, 1995
- Vardon Trophy: 1989, 1990, 1994
- PGA Tour Player of the Year: 1995
- PGA Player of the Year: 1995
- Old Tom Morris Award: 2008
- Charlie Bartlett Award: 2008

Gregory John Norman (born 10 February 1955) is an Australian retired professional golfer who spent 331 weeks as world number one in the 1980s and 1990s. He won 88 professional tournaments, including 20 PGA Tour tournaments and two majors: The Open Championship in 1986 and 1993. Norman also earned thirty top-10 finishes and was the runner-up eight times in majors throughout his career. In a reference to his blond hair, size, aggressive golf style and his birthplace's native coastal animal, Norman's nickname is "the Great White Shark" (often shortened to just "the Shark"), which he earned after his play at the 1981 Masters.

Norman's business interests began during his playing career. He is the chairman and CEO of the Greg Norman Company, a global corporation with a portfolio of companies in fields including apparel, interior design, real estate, wine production, private equity and golf course design. Between 2021 and 2025, he was the CEO of LIV Golf Investments, a start-up company financed by Saudi Arabia's sovereign wealth fund; the LIV Golf Invitational Series of golf tournaments began in 2022.

Norman has donated to and established numerous charities and charity events, like the QBE Shootout which benefits the CureSearch for Children's Cancer fund. He became a Trustee of the Environmental Institute for Golf in 2004 and received the Golf Writers Association of America's Bartlett Award in 2008 for his charitable work.

== Early life ==
Norman was born in Mount Isa, Queensland, Australia to Mervin and Toini Norman. His mother was the daughter of a Finnish carpenter, and his father an electrical engineer. As a youth, he played rugby and cricket and aspired to be a professional surfer. His mother Toini, who had a single-figure handicap, taught the 15-year-old Norman how to play golf and allowed him to caddy for her at the Virginia Golf Club in Brisbane. Within about eighteen months, Norman went from a 27 handicap to a scratch handicap. In Townsville, Queensland, Norman attended Townsville Central State School (enrolled 1964) and then Townsville Grammar School then moved on to Aspley State High School on the north side of Brisbane.

== Amateur career ==
In June 1974, at the age of 19, Norman received media attention at the Queensland Open. The Canberra Times reported that "the young amateur Greg Norman" was one shot off the lead after the first round.

== Professional career ==
As of March 1975, Norman had turned professional. He served as assistant professional under Billy McWilliam OAM at Beverley Park Golf Club in Sydney, New South Wales. Shortly thereafter, in the same year, Norman started work as Charlie Earp's trainee in the Royal Queensland Golf Club pro shop, earning A$38 a week.

=== Australian and European Tours ===
Norman's first four-round professional tournament was the 1976 South Coast Open at Bateman's Bay. In the first round, Norman shot a 68 (−3) to put him in a tie for fifth place, three back of David Good's lead. He followed it up with an even-par 71 to remain in the top ten. In the third round, he "jumped into the reckoning" with a two-under-par 69 which included five birdies on the back nine, one back of the lead. In the final round, he had a chance to win down the stretch but was "edged out" by Barry Burgess. His second tournament was at the following week's Queensland Open. Norman was well back of the lead entering Sunday but shot a final round 70 (−3) to finish in a tie for third. The next week he recorded another top-15 finish at the New South Wales Open. His fourth tournament was the West Lakes Classic held at The Grange Golf Club in Adelaide, South Australia. In the first round, Norman "upstaged his more experienced opponents" to shoot a "brilliant" 64 (−7) to take a three shot lead. In the second round, despite incurring three penalty strokes, Norman shot a four-under-par 67 to expand his lead to five shots. Norman followed it up with a 66 (−5) to create 10 shot lead. On Sunday, however, he had a "fluctuating" final round with six bogeys, six pars, five birdies, and one double-bogey for a 74 (+3). Though David Graham got within four shots Norman held on to win by five. Norman described the win as "unreal." He later said, "It's been a great experience and now I know what now to do − I think."

Norman joined the European Tour in the following year and had his first victory in a European event that same season at the Martini International at the Blairgowrie Club in Scotland. In 1980, Norman earned a sizable victory in the French Open, winning the tournament by ten shots. He won the Scandinavian Enterprise Open in Sweden with a course record of 64 in the final round. Later in 1980, Norman won the Suntory World Match Play Championship. Norman also won his first Australian Open that year, his first of five wins in that event.

In 1981, Norman finished in 4th place on his debut at the Masters in Augusta, finishing just three strokes behind the winner Tom Watson. Norman had a victory in the 1981 British Masters and he won his third Martini International tournament that year as well. In 1982, Norman was the leading money winner on the European Tour. He won three European events that year, including successfully defending his British Masters title. The following year, Norman joined the U.S. PGA Tour.

=== PGA Tour ===
In June 1984, Norman won his maiden PGA Tour victory at the Kemper Open, winning by five strokes. He gained worldwide prominence two weeks later at the 1984 U.S. Open. Norman holed a dramatic 45-foot putt on the 72nd hole to force a playoff with former Masters champion Fuzzy Zoeller, so astonishing to all that Zoeller took his white golf towel and waved it in joking surrender. At the next day's 18-hole playoff, Zoeller would earn a 67–75 victory over Norman. He was able to put the defeat behind him with a victory at the Canadian Open the next month in July for his second win of the year.

In 1985, Norman won the Toshiba Australian PGA Championship and the National Panasonic Australian Open. He had two runner-up finishes in the U.S. PGA Tour that year, finishing tied for second place at the Canadian Open and at the Bank of Boston Classic.

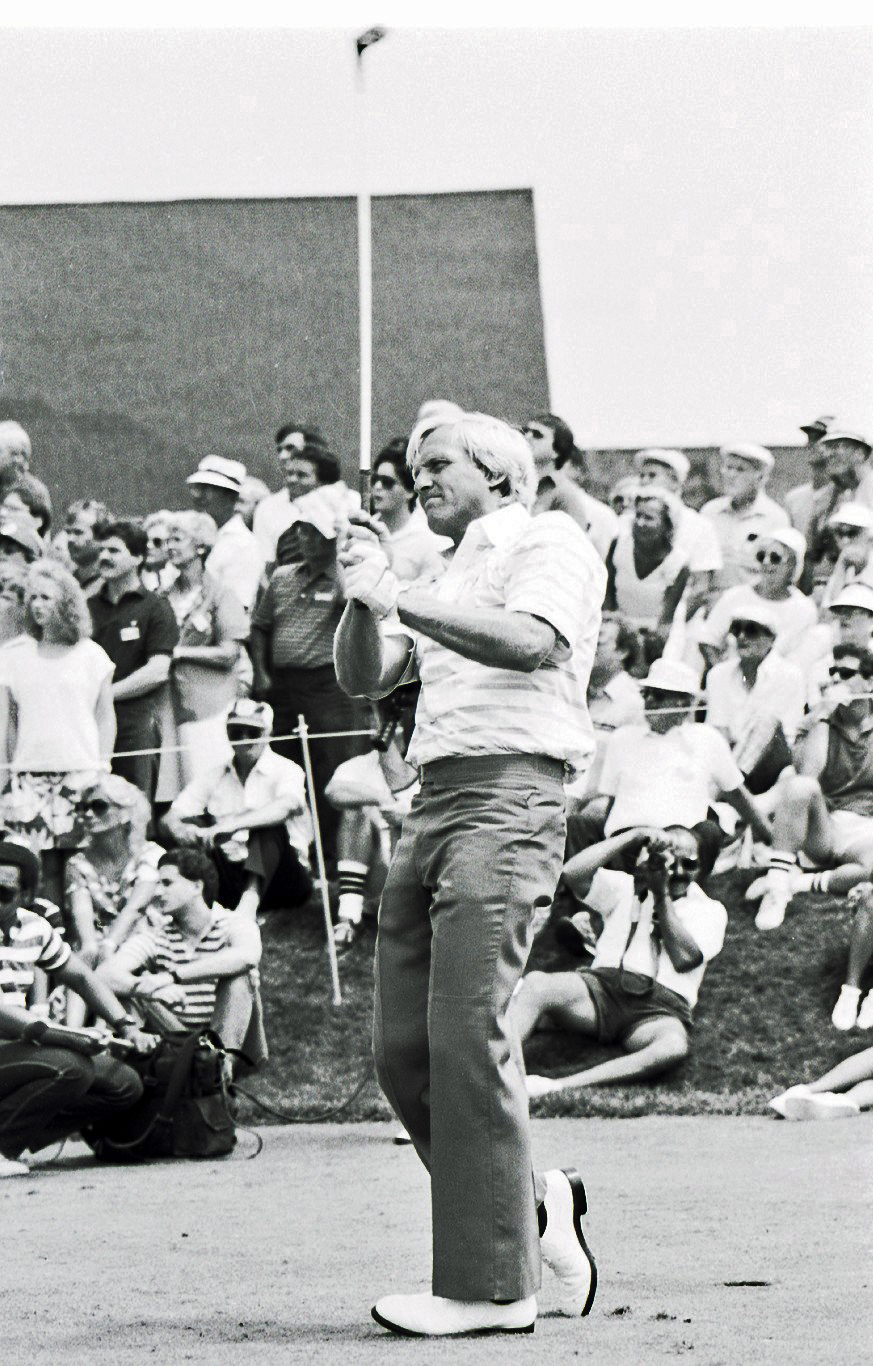
Norman in 1986

In 1986, Norman's 11 worldwide victories that year included four wins in Australia and two regular PGA Tour events; the Panasonic Las Vegas Invitational and the Kemper Open (for the second time) but 1986 is remembered for the Norman Slam or the Saturday Slam. Norman held the lead for all four majors through 54 holes. This meant he played in the final group for every major and had perhaps the best chance in history of winning the single-season Grand Slam. However, the only major victory Norman earned that year was in the 1986 Open Championship at Turnberry.

At the 1986 Masters, Norman began the final round with a one-stroke lead which he maintained until he double-bogeyed the 10th. After making four consecutive birdies on holes 14 to 17, Norman was tied with Jack Nicklaus going to the 18th. Norman missed a par putt on the 18th that would have sent the two into a sudden-death playoff. At the 1986 U.S. Open at Shinnecock Hills, Norman again led after 54 holes. However, Norman faltered on the final day, finishing with a final round 75 placing him six strokes behind the winner, Raymond Floyd.

Norman finally broke through at the 1986 Open Championship for his first major title. Norman shot a second round of 63 on Friday at Turnberry, tying the record for the lowest ever round at the Open. Only 15 players broke par in the second round. Tom Watson described Norman's feat as "the greatest round ever played in a tournament in which I was a competitor." Norman survived the weekend's brutal conditions at Turnberry, with a final round of 69 to win The Open by five shots. After being presented with the Claret Jug trophy, Norman said: "Outside of Australia, Britain was the first place that accepted me as a professional golfer. To win my first Open in front of the British public is the greatest feeling ever." Norman was again in contention at the 1986 PGA Championship. He was in the lead on the final day, but shot a final-round 76 to finish 2 strokes behind the eventual winner, Bob Tway.

Norman's four wins in Australia in 1986 helped him to finish top of the Australian Order of Merit for the fifth time. He also topped the U.S. PGA Tour money list for the first time that year. In September 1986, Norman won the Panasonic European Open at Sunningdale Golf Club and the following month he had another victory in England, winning his third World Match Play Championship at Wentworth. Norman ended 1986 with eleven worldwide victories and was officially ranked number 1 in the brand new Official World Golf Rankings.

Norman endured another setback at the 1987 Masters. In his final round on the 18th green, Norman had a 20-foot putt for a birdie that would win the tournament. The ball trickled over the left lip of the cup, missing by millimetres. After Norman's par on the 72nd hole at Augusta, he found himself in a sudden-death playoff with Larry Mize and Seve Ballesteros. On the second playoff hole, with Ballesteros eliminated, Mize holed a 47-yard (140-foot) chip to win the tournament. Norman did, however, win the Australian Masters in February 1987 and the Australian Open later in the year by a record ten shots at Royal Melbourne Golf Club, beating the previous Australian Open record winning margin of eight strokes by Jack Nicklaus in 1971. Norman's 1987 victory at the Australian Open lifted him back above Seve Ballesteros to the top of the Official World Golf Ranking.

Norman had another four wins in Australia in 1988. In the U.S., Norman won the MCI Heritage Golf Classic at Hilton Head Island, South Carolina, in April 1988, inspired by a leukemia-stricken teenager who got his wish to meet Norman and watch him play. The teenage boy was only supposed to watch the golfer for two rounds, but Norman arranged for him to stay until the tournament's completion. After the tournament, Norman awarded the teenager with the trophy. He was inducted into the Sport Australia Hall of Fame in that year.

At the 1989 Masters, Norman missed a 12-foot par putt on the 72nd hole, which would have put him into a playoff with Nick Faldo and Scott Hoch. Norman had another chance at a major in 1989, this time at the Open Championship at Royal Troon. He played a final round of 64, starting his round with six straight birdies, forcing his way into a playoff with Mark Calcavecchia and Wayne Grady. Going into the final playoff hole, Norman and Calcavecchia were tied, but two successive bunker shots by Norman gave Calcavecchia the victory.

Norman won the Doral-Ryder Open and Memorial Tournament in 1990. He also missed the cut for the first time at Augusta National in the 1990 Masters. In the 1990 Open Championship at St Andrews, Norman began with two rounds of 66, leaving himself sharing the lead with Nick Faldo after 36 holes and the pair four shots ahead of the rest of the field. Faldo then shot a third round of 67, but Norman could only manage 76. Norman finished the tournament tied for sixth place, while Faldo won by five shots. Although 1990 was not Norman's strongest majors year, he finished at the top of the PGA Tour money list for the second time in his career and won the Vardon Trophy and Byron Nelson Award. Later that year, he won the Australian Masters in his home country for a final and record sixth time.

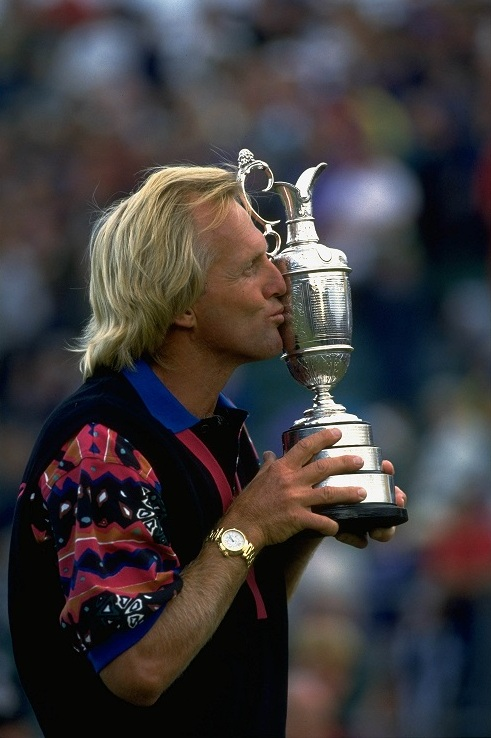
Norman's second Major championship, 1993 Open at Royal St George's.

After a career slump in the early 1990s, Norman turned to renowned coach Butch Harmon for help. Together, the two rebuilt Norman's game by solving mechanical problems that had crept into his swing. As a result of this training, Norman earned his second major at Royal St George's in the 1993 Open Championship. There, in ideal conditions, Norman defeated a leaderboard consisting of Nick Faldo, Bernhard Langer and Corey Pavin. Norman's final round 64 was the lowest score by a winner in Open history until Henrik Stenson's 63 at the 2016 Open Championship.

During the following year, 1994, Norman easily beat records for the lowest 18-, 54-, and 72-hole scores at The Players Championship. After opening with a course record-tying 63, he followed with three 67s to give him a final total of 264 strokes, or 24 under par—six strokes better than any previous winner. Norman finished third at the 1995 Masters and was the runner-up at the 1995 U.S. Open. In June, Norman won his second Memorial Tournament, a victory that marked the beginning of one of his best years on the PGA Tour. After his win at the Canon Greater Hartford Open, aided by a chip-in in for eagle on No. 14 in the final round, Norman overtook Nick Price as the number one golfer in the world. Later, he won the NEC World Series of Golf, holing a 70-foot birdie chip shot to defeat Billy Mayfair and Nick Price in a playoff on the first hole. He ultimately held the No. 1 ranking for 331 weeks in his career. He also topped the money list for the third time and was named PGA Player of the Year.

The following year, Norman opened the 1996 Masters Tournament with a course record-tying 63 which put him at the top of the leaderboard. He held the lead through three days of play. Norman took a six-stroke lead into the final round and lost the tournament to Nick Faldo by five strokes, shooting a Sunday 78 to Faldo's 67. In January 1997, Norman won his largest winner's check to date, one million dollars, when he won the Andersen Consulting World Championship of Golf. Norman then won two tournaments in 1997, but they were his final victories on the PGA Tour. In 1998, Norman missed part of the season after suffering hip and shoulder injuries.

In July 2008, despite not playing in a major for three years, Norman finished nine over par in a tie for third at The Open Championship after being the 54-hole leader by two strokes. At 53, he set the record in becoming the oldest 54-hole leader in a major championship; a record that would last for just one year, until 59-year-old Tom Watson led the 2009 Open Championship after three rounds.

=== Champions Tour ===
Norman turned 50 in February 2005, but has kept his distance from the senior golf circuit. This is due, in part, because of his focus on business, but also because of lingering hip and back issues. In 2003, Norman said: "Hitting about four million golf balls has created unfortunate wear and tear." He had knee surgery in October 2005 and February 2006. Norman believes his back injuries could have been averted had he been introduced to the concept of golf fitness early in his career.

== Career achievements and legacy ==
Norman has earned more than $1 million five times on the U.S. PGA Tour, including three Arnold Palmer Awards as the Tour's leading money winner in 1986, 1990 and 1995. He was also the first person in Tour history to surpass $10 million in career earnings. He has 30 top-10 finishes in majors, or more than 38% of those he has entered. His 20 PGA Tour wins in the 1980s and 1990s ranks second behind Tom Watson (21 total) during this span. He had the lowest total four round score in the history of The Open Championship 267, in 1993, (since broken by Henrik Stenson in 2016), and The Players Championship (264, in 1994).

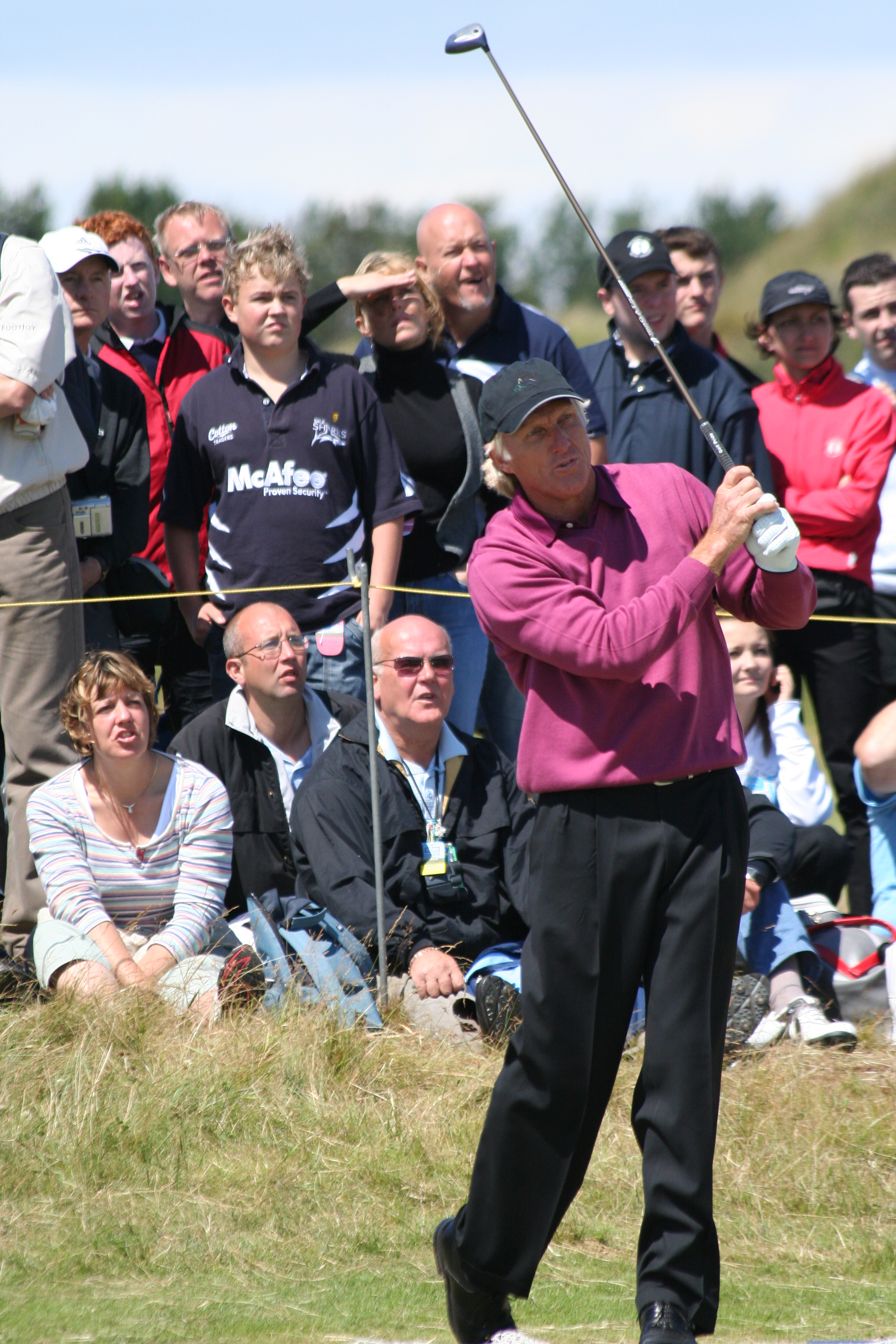
Norman tees off at Royal Birkdale

Norman's dominance over his peers (despite his comparative lack of success in the majors) was probably best expressed in the Official World Golf Rankings: Norman finished the year on top of the ranking list on seven occasions, in 1986, 1987, 1989, 1990, 1995, 1996 and 1997, and was second at the end of 1988, 1993 and 1994. Norman won the PGA Tour of Australia's Order of Merit six times: 1978, 1980, 1983, 1984, 1986 and 1988. He won the European Tour's Order of Merit in 1982, and topped the PGA Tour's money list in 1986, 1990, and 1995. He won the Vardon Trophy for lowest scoring average on the PGA Tour three times: 1989, 1990 and 1994; and was inducted into the World Golf Hall of Fame in 2001.

In 1986, Norman was awarded the BBC Overseas Sports Personality of the Year Award, a feat he replicated in 1993 to join Muhammad Ali as a multiple winner of the award (now also joined by Roger Federer and Usain Bolt). In 2007, Norman was elevated to "Legend" status in the Sport Australia Hall of Fame. He received the 2008 Old Tom Morris Award from the Golf Course Superintendents Association of America, GCSAA's highest honour, at the 2008 Golf Industry Show in Orlando. Norman is a member of The Environmental Institute for Golf's board of trustees and also chairs The institute's advisory council. He was also the recipient of the Golf Writers Association of America's 2008 Charlie Bartlett Award. In 2009 Norman was inducted into the Queensland Sport Hall of Fame.

In 2009, as part of the Q150 celebrations, Greg Norman was announced as one of the Q150 Icons of Queensland for his role as a "sports legend".

In 2015, the PGA of Australia established the Greg Norman Medal, which is awarded to the best Australian male or female golfer in a given year. He also received the Australian Global Icon Award and the National Golf Course Owner's Association Award of Merit both in 2015.

=== Playing style ===
Norman had a bold and aggressive style of play. He is widely regarded as one of the best drivers of the golf ball in his era. In the fourteen seasons between 1984 and 1997, Norman finished in the top 20 in total driving on the PGA Tour twelve times and in the top 6 nine times (including first in 1988, 1989 and 1993). When driving long and straight off the tee with a persimmon (wood) clubhead in his prime, Norman intimidated many of his fellow professionals. His high ball flight enabled him to carry the ball very long distances. In 2009, Nick Price said: "The best driver I ever saw was Greg Norman."

== Greg Norman Company ==
Norman founded the Greg Norman Company [originally known as Great White Shark Enterprises (GWSE)] in 1993 after leaving his previous management group, IMG. The now multi-national corporation is headquartered in West Palm Beach, Florida. He initially used the Reebok-licensed shark logo for his line of apparel; it now represents over a dozen different businesses. The company reports hundreds of millions of dollars in revenue annually. In 2016, the company changed its branding to become the "Greg Norman Company."

Norman owns a number of business properties wholly owned by Great White Shark Enterprises.

First established in 1987, Greg Norman Golf Course Design (GNGCD) has been responsible for the creation of over 100 golf courses across the world.

The Greg Norman Collection began in 1992 after Reebok gave Norman his own line of clothing. It reached $100 million in annual sales in 2005. The collection is composed largely of golf-inspired activewear for men and women.

Greg Norman Estates is a wine company that produces 14 different varietals from Australia, California, and Argentina. The brand is known for attracting attention from Wine Spectator, having earned the number 8 spot in the world with a 1998 Reserve Shiraz.

The real estate division of the company is responsible for a variety of developments and projects including the Medalist Village in Hobe Sound, Florida. The Greg Norman Design Group is a separate wing of the real estate division that deals in interior design.

The Great White Shark Opportunity Fund is an asset-based, debt-lending fund that invests in public and private small- to mid-cap growth companies throughout the world. The platform offers alternative lending and flex capital.

A joint venture between Norman and his son, Greg Norman Jr., Shark Wake Park is a brand of wakeboarding complexes. The first park opened in Myrtle Beach, South Carolina in June 2016, and a second, larger park opened in June 2019 in West Palm Beach, Florida.

Norman launched a connected golf cart in 2017 with partners Verizon, GPSi and Club Car. The cart is equipped with touchscreen display for music and GPS while playing a course.

Debuting in 2011, Greg Norman Eyewear provides sunglasses that are designed for use on the golf course. The brand has a partnership with Aspex Eyewear and is distributed in the United States by Aspex.

Greg Norman Australian Prime is a branded line of premium Wagyu steaks and other beef products.

Located in Barefoot Landing in North Myrtle Beach, South Carolina, Greg Norman Australian Grille offers fine dining with an Australian theme.

=== Non-GWSE properties and partnerships ===
In addition to the wholly owned companies under the company umbrella, there are also numerous partially owned companies and partnerships. For instance, Norman invested in and became the ambassador for Vancouver-based GPS Industries in 2004. GWSE partnered with Kohlberg & Company to acquire Troon Golf, one of the world's largest golf management companies with over 250 golf courses in its portfolio. Norman is also a leading investment partner in Alchemy Global, a firm that seeks investors for sports startups.

Norman is also the brand ambassador and partner to numerous companies including Qantas (a partnership he's been in since 1976), Cobra Golf, OMEGA, and others.

In 2017, Authentic Brands Group become a controlling partner for the consumer products division of The Greg Norman Company.

== Other ventures ==
=== World Golf Tour ===
In November 1994 during the Shark Shootout, Norman announced a proposed international golf circuit known as the World Golf Tour; the tour would have launched in 1995, and consisted of eight limited field tournaments largely held against PGA Tour events, with fields featuring top players on the Sony Rankings. Each tournament would have offered a $600,000 prize for winners (roughly double that of major U.S. tournaments at the time), while a $1 million bonus would be awarded to the "player of the year" at the end of the season. The tour would be backed by Rupert Murdoch, with Fox Sports televising all events; Norman argued that the PGA Tour had not done enough to grow the game of golf internationally. The announcement provoked criticism, with a lack of concrete detail on the events besides scheduled dates, and newspaper columnists describing Norman as acting "greedy" and "self-serving".

The World Golf Tour had come in the wake of a probe by the U.S. Federal Trade Commission, on whether policies requiring PGA Tour players to obtain an exemption to compete with events that conflict with tour events were a violation of competition law; in 1995, the FTC voted to drop and not take action on the probe. PGA Tour commissioner Tim Finchem had already threatened to suspend players who compete in breakaway competitions, while Arnold Palmer gave a speech critical of the proposed event during a meeting of PGA Tour players. Norman attempted to solicit interest from players by slipping contracts under the doors of hotel rooms during the Johnnie Walker World Golf Championship, but no one would respond—signalling an overall lack of interest. Norman was later caught off-guard by the 1997 announcement of the World Golf Championships (WGC), a PGA Tour-backed series of limited field events with a similar concept to his proposed series.

=== LIV Golf Investments ===
LIV Golf Investments was led by Greg Norman as CEO from 2021 to 2025 when he was replaced by Scott O'Neil. His departure followed the expiration of his contract in August 2025, after which he confirmed in September that he would step away from any formal role in the league. The LIV Golf Invitational Series began in 2022 and consist of seven regular-season events where players compete both individually for points and as part of a team. The series provoked strong resistance from the established PGA Tour and European Tour organisations, including suspensions of players who joined the series, and criticism of its financial backing by Saudi Arabia's Public Investment Fund.

In May 2022 when asked on Sky Sports News about Saudi Arabia's extensive human rights violations and how Norman felt about working for such people he stated: "No they're not my bosses. We're independent, I do not answer to Saudi Arabia, I do not answer to MBS." LIV Golf Investments is on the public record as being under the majority ownership of Saudi Arabia's Public Investment Fund (PIF). This fund has been controlled by Crown Prince Mohammed bin Salman, Saudi Arabia's de facto ruler since 2015.

=== Philanthropy ===
The QBE Shootout, formerly known as the Shark Shootout, was a PGA Tour team golf event hosted by Greg Norman. The event was played at the Tiburón Golf Club in Naples, Florida. The Shootout benefited CureSearch National Childhood Cancer Foundation. In 2023, the PGA Tour replaced the QBE Shootout with the Grant Thornton Invitational, a 16-team event which features one male and one female pro golfer on each team. The Greg Norman Golf Foundation was formed by Greg Norman and his father Merv Norman in 1987. The foundation provides professional guidance and instruction throughout Queensland to school students and those in other educational establishments, children with specific physical disabilities, and junior members of golf clubs. The Environmental Institute for Golf — the philanthropic arm of the Golf Course Superintendents Association of America (GCSAA) — is a collaborative effort of the environmental and golf communities, dedicated to strengthening the compatibility of golf with the natural environment. Norman became a Trustee of the Institute and a member of its advisory council in 2004.

=== Broadcasting ===
On 23 April 2014, Fox Sports announced that Norman would join Joe Buck as its lead commentary team for its coverage of the USGA's championships beginning in 2015. However, following criticism of his performance at the 2015 U.S. Open, it was announced in January 2016 that Paul Azinger would replace Norman as the lead golf analyst for Fox Sports.

=== Autobiography ===
Norman released his autobiography, titled The Way of the Shark, in 2006.

=== Other media ===
In 2022, he was the subject of the ESPN documentary Shark, part of their 30 for 30 series.

== Personal life ==
Norman had a brief romance with British tennis player Sue Barker before he met Laura Andrassy, an American flight attendant. Norman married Andrassy in July 1981. They had two children, a son and a daughter. They divorced in 2006, with Andrassy receiving a $105 million settlement. He married former World No. 1 tennis player Chris Evert on Paradise Island in the Bahamas in June 2008, but they separated after only 15 months and were subsequently divorced. In November 2010, Norman married interior designer Kirsten Kutner on Necker Island in the British Virgin Islands, with his son as his best man. Norman has two grandchildren.

In December 2020, Norman was hospitalized with COVID-19. While in hospital, he shared an update on Instagram saying, "It's been an ugly one. I for one am looking forward to getting out of this quarantine and looking forward to building whatever the great future is for 2021 and beyond."

=== Political views ===
Norman was accused by US Congressman Tim Burchett of promoting Saudi Arabian “propaganda” through his involvement with the LIV series. Norman has rejected this criticism.

Norman was a vocal supporter of the presidency and policies of Donald Trump. "(From) my business perspective, he’s done a phenomenal job," Norman told one publication about Trump. "He has pretty much stuck to all his promises he made when he was elected."

== Professional wins (88) ==
=== PGA Tour wins (20) ===
Legend
Major championships (2)
Players Championships (1)
Other PGA Tour (17)

No.	Date	Tournament	Winning score	Margin of victory	Runner(s)-up
1	3 Jun 1984	Kemper Open	−8 (68-68-71-73=280)	5 strokes	(United States) Mark O'Meara
2	1 Jul 1984	Canadian Open	−10 (73-68-70-67=278)	2 strokes	(United States) Jack Nicklaus
3	4 May 1986	Panasonic Las Vegas Invitational	−27 (73-63-68-64-65=333)	7 strokes	(United States) Dan Pohl
4	1 Jun 1986	Kemper Open (2)	−11 (72-69-70-66=277)	Playoff	(United States) Larry Mize
5	20 Jul 1986	The Open Championship	E (74-63-74-69=280)	5 strokes	(England) Gordon J. Brand
6	17 Apr 1988	MCI Heritage Golf Classic	−13 (65-69-71-66=271)	1 stroke	(South Africa) David Frost, (United States) Gil Morgan
7	20 Aug 1989	The International	13 pts (5-4-11-13=13)	2 points	(United States) Clarence Rose
8	3 Sep 1989	Greater Milwaukee Open	−19 (64-69-66-70=269)	3 strokes	(United States) Andy Bean
9	4 Mar 1990	Doral-Ryder Open	−15 (68-73-70-62=273)	Playoff	(United States) Tim Simpson, (United States) Mark Calcavecchia, (United States) Paul Azinger
10	13 May 1990	Memorial Tournament	E (73-74-69=216) (Note: Shortened to 36/54 holes due to weather.)	1 stroke	(United States) Payne Stewart
11	13 Sep 1992	Canadian Open (2)	−8 (73-66-71-70=280)	Playoff	(United States) Bruce Lietzke
12	7 Mar 1993	Doral-Ryder Open (2)	−23 (65-68-62-70=265)	4 strokes	(United States) Paul Azinger, (United States) Mark McCumber
13	18 Jul 1993	The Open Championship (2)	−13 (66-68-69-64=267)	2 strokes	(England) Nick Faldo
14	27 Mar 1994	The Players Championship	−24 (63-67-67-67=264)	4 strokes	(United States) Fuzzy Zoeller
15	4 Jun 1995	Memorial Tournament (2)	−19 (66-70-67-66=269)	4 strokes	(United States) Mark Calcavecchia, (United States) David Duval, (Australia) Steve Elkington
16	25 Jun 1995	Canon Greater Hartford Open	−13 (67-64-65-71=267)	2 strokes	(United States) Dave Stockton Jr., (United States) Kirk Triplett, (New Zealand) Grant Waite
17	27 Aug 1995	NEC World Series of Golf	−2 (73-68-70-67=278)	Playoff	(United States) Billy Mayfair, (Zimbabwe) Nick Price
18	3 Mar 1996	Doral-Ryder Open (3)	−19 (67-69-67-66=269)	2 strokes	(United States) Michael Bradley, (Fiji) Vijay Singh
19	29 Jun 1997	FedEx St. Jude Classic	−16 (68-65-69-66=268)	1 stroke	(United States) Dudley Hart
20	24 Aug 1997	NEC World Series of Golf (2)	−7 (68-68-70-67=273)	4 strokes	(United States) Phil Mickelson

PGA Tour playoff record (4–8)

No.	Year	Tournament	Opponent(s)	Result
1	1983	Bay Hill Classic	(United States) Mike Nicolette	Lost to par on first extra hole
2	1984	U.S. Open	(United States) Fuzzy Zoeller	Lost 18-hole playoff; Zoeller: −3 (67), Norman: +5 (75)
3	1984	Western Open	(United States) Tom Watson	Lost to birdie on third extra hole
4	1986	Kemper Open	(United States) Larry Mize	Won with par on sixth extra hole
5	1987	Masters Tournament	(Spain) Seve Ballesteros, (United States) Larry Mize	Mize won with birdie on second extra hole Ballesteros eliminated by par on first hole
6	1988	Independent Insurance Agent Open	(United States) Curtis Strange	Lost to birdie on third extra hole
7	1988	Manufacturers Hanover Westchester Classic	(Spain) Seve Ballesteros, (South Africa) David Frost, (United States) Ken Green	Ballesteros won with birdie on first extra hole
8	1989	The Open Championship	(United States) Mark Calcavecchia, (Australia) Wayne Grady	Calcavecchia won four-hole aggregate playoff; Calcavecchia: −2 (4-3-3-3=13), Grady: +1 (4-4-4-4=16), Norman: x (3-3-4-x=x)
9	1990	Doral-Ryder Open	(United States) Paul Azinger, (United States) Mark Calcavecchia, (United States) Tim Simpson	Won with eagle on first extra hole
10	1992	Canadian Open	(United States) Bruce Lietzke	Won with birdie on second extra hole
11	1993	PGA Championship	(United States) Paul Azinger	Lost to par on second extra hole
12	1995	NEC World Series of Golf	(United States) Billy Mayfair, (Zimbabwe) Nick Price	Won with birdie on first extra hole

=== European Tour wins (14) ===
Legend
Major championships (2)
Other European Tour (12)

No.	Date	Tournament	Winning score	Margin of victory	Runner(s)-up
1	11 Jun 1977	Martini International	−11 (70-71-70-66=277)	3 strokes	(South Africa) Simon Hobday
2	28 May 1979	Martini International (2)	E (75-67-72-74=288)	1 stroke	(Spain) Antonio Garrido, (England) John Morgan
3	11 May 1980	Paco Rabanne Open de France	−20 (67-66-68-67=268)	10 strokes	(England) Ian Mosey
4	6 Jul 1980	Scandinavian Enterprise Open	−12 (76-66-70-64=276)	3 strokes	(England) Mark James
5	17 May 1981	Martini International (3)	−1 (71-72-72-72=287)	1 stroke	(West Germany) Bernhard Langer
6	31 May 1981	Dunlop Masters	−15 (72-68-66-67=273)	4 strokes	(Australia) Graham Marsh
7	13 Jun 1982	Dunlop Masters (2)	−17 (68-69-65-65=267)	8 strokes	(West Germany) Bernhard Langer
8	10 Jul 1982	State Express English Classic	−13 (70-70-70-69=279)	1 stroke	(Scotland) Brian Marchbank
9	22 Aug 1982	Benson & Hedges International Open	−5 (69-74-69-71=283)	1 stroke	(New Zealand) Bob Charles, (Australia) Graham Marsh, (Wales) Ian Woosnam
10	20 Jul 1986	The Open Championship	E (74-63-74-69=280)	5 strokes	(England) Gordon J. Brand
11	14 Sep 1986	Panasonic European Open	−11 (67-67-69-66=269)	Playoff	(Scotland) Ken Brown
12	22 May 1988	Lancia Italian Open	−18 (69-68-63-70=270)	1 stroke	(Australia) Craig Parry
13	18 Jul 1993	The Open Championship (2)	−13 (66-68-69-64=267)	2 strokes	(England) Nick Faldo
14	6 Feb 1994	Johnnie Walker Classic	−11 (75-70-64-68=277)	1 stroke	(United States) Fred Couples

European Tour playoff record (1–6)

No.	Year	Tournament	Opponent(s)	Result
1	1984	U.S. Open	(United States) Fuzzy Zoeller	Lost 18-hole playoff; Zoeller: −3 (67), Norman: +5 (75)
2	1986	Panasonic European Open	(Scotland) Ken Brown	Won with birdie on first extra hole
3	1987	Masters Tournament	(Spain) Seve Ballesteros, (United States) Larry Mize	Mize won with birdie on second extra hole Ballesteros eliminated by par on first hole
4	1989	The Open Championship	(United States) Mark Calcavecchia, (Australia) Wayne Grady	Calcavecchia won four-hole aggregate playoff; Calcavecchia: −2 (4-3-3-3=13), Grady: +1 (4-4-4-4=16), Norman: x (3-3-4-x=x)
5	1993	PGA Championship	(United States) Paul Azinger	Lost to par on second extra hole
6	1997	Dubai Desert Classic	(Australia) Richard Green, (Wales) Ian Woosnam	Green won with birdie on first extra hole
7	1997	Peugeot Open de España	(England) Mark James	Lost to par on third extra hole

=== PGA of Japan Tour wins (2) ===
No.	Date	Tournament	Winning score	Margin of victory	Runner(s)-up
1	30 Apr 1989	The Crowns	−8 (65-68-71-68=272)	3 strokes	(United States) Blaine McCallister, (Japan) Koichi Suzuki
2	14 Nov 1993	Sumitomo Visa Taiheiyo Masters	−16 (70-67-67-68=272)	1 stroke	(Japan) Yoshi Mizumaki

=== Asia Golf Circuit wins (2) ===
No.	Date	Tournament	Winning score	Margin of victory	Runner(s)-up
1	25 Feb 1979	Cathay Pacific Hong Kong Open	−6 (70-66-69-68=273)	3 strokes	(Taiwan) Chen Tze-ming, (Taiwan) Hsu Chi-san, (Taiwan) Lu Hsi-chuen
2	27 Feb 1983	Cathay Pacific Hong Kong Open (2)	−6 (68-66=134)	3 strokes	(England) Mark James

=== PGA Tour of Australasia wins (33) ===
Legend
Flagship events (2)
Other PGA Tour of Australasia (31)

No.	Date	Tournament	Winning score	Margin of victory	Runner(s)-up
1	24 Oct 1976	West Lakes Classic	−13 (64-66-67-74=271)	5 strokes	(Australia) David Graham, (Australia) Graham Marsh
2	22 Jan 1978	Caltex Festival of Sydney Open	−14 (73-69-72-64=278)	3 strokes	(Australia) Ian Stanley
3	30 Jan 1978	Traralgon Loy Yang Classic	−11 (71-70-69-67=277)	1 stroke	(Australia) Colin Bishop
4	5 Nov 1978	New South Wales Open	−13 (64-72-69-70=275)	3 strokes	(Australia) Bill Dunk
5	28 Jan 1979	Traralgon Classic (2)	−11 (69-65-71-72=277)	3 strokes	(Australia) Glenn McCully, (Australia) Ian Stanley
6	9 Dec 1979	Queensland PGA Championship	−7 (285)	8 strokes	
7	16 Nov 1980	Dunhill Australian Open	−4 (71-70-73-70=284)	1 stroke	(Australia) Brian Jones
8	1 Mar 1981	Australian Masters	−3 (67-77-71-74=289)	7 strokes	(Australia) Terry Gale, (Japan) Norio Suzuki
9	20 Feb 1983	Australian Masters (2)	−7 (74-67-78-66=285)	4 strokes	(West Germany) Bernhard Langer
10	16 Oct 1983	Stefan Queensland Open	−11 (67-68-70-72=277)	1 stroke	(Australia) Ossie Moore, (Australia) Bob Shearer
11	23 Oct 1983	National Panasonic New South Wales Open (2)	−4 (75-68-67-68=278)	Playoff	(Australia) David Graham
12	12 Feb 1984	Victorian Open	−7 (70-71-68-72=281)	2 strokes	(Australia) Bob Shearer
13	19 Feb 1984	Australian Masters (3)	−7 (74-71-70-70=285)	3 strokes	(Australia) David Graham, (West Germany) Bernhard Langer
14	4 Nov 1984	Toshiba Australian PGA Championship	−11 (66-71-71-69=277)	8 strokes	(Australia) Rodger Davis
15	3 Nov 1985	Toshiba Australian PGA Championship (2)	−15 (70-68-66-69=273)	8 strokes	(Sweden) Magnus Persson
16	17 Nov 1985	National Panasonic Australian Open (2)	−4 (67-71-74=212)	2 strokes	(Australia) Ossie Moore
17	12 Oct 1986	Stefan Queensland Open (2)	−11 (67-70-70-70=277)	6 strokes	(Australia) Peter Senior, (Australia) Jeff Woodland
18	19 Oct 1986	National Panasonic New South Wales Open (3)	−9 (65-70-67-73=275)	5 strokes	(Australia) Lyndsay Stephen
19	25 Oct 1986	West End Jubilee South Australian Open	−5 (75-68-75-65=283)	3 strokes	(Australia) David Graham
20	23 Nov 1986	National Panasonic Western Australian Open	−12 (72-70-66-68=276)	1 stroke	(Australia) Terry Gale
21	15 Feb 1987	Australian Masters (4)	−19 (68-67-68-70=273)	9 strokes	(Australia) Peter Senior
22	30 Nov 1987	National Panasonic Australian Open (3)	−15 (70-66-66-71=273)	10 strokes	(Scotland) Sandy Lyle
23	31 Jan 1988	Daikyo Palm Meadows Cup	−16 (69-66-67-70=272)	1 stroke	(Japan) Tateo Ozaki
24	28 Feb 1988	ESP Open	−19 (62-70-69-68=269)	7 strokes	(West Germany) Bernhard Langer
25	6 Mar 1988	Australian Tournament Players Championship	−18 (67-67-68-68=270)	8 strokes	(Australia) David Graham, (Australia) Peter Senior
26	23 Oct 1988	Panasonic New South Wales Open (4)	−7 (66-69-69-73=277)	1 stroke	(Australia) Craig Parry
27	19 Feb 1989	Australian Masters (5)	−12 (69-69-74-68=280)	5 strokes	(England) Russell Claydon (a)
28	26 Feb 1989	Australian Tournament Players Championship (2)	−12 (70-70-69-67=276)	2 strokes	(Australia) Roger Mackay
29	18 Feb 1990	Australian Masters (6)	−19 (68-67-70-68=273)	2 strokes	(Australia) Mike Clayton, (England) Nick Faldo, (United States) John Morse
30	26 Nov 1995	Heineken Australian Open (4)	−10 (72-69-69-68=278)	2 strokes	(Australia) Peter McWhinney
31	11 Feb 1996	Ford South Australian Open (2)	−4 (74-72-69-69=284)	1 stroke	(France) Jean-Louis Guépy
32	24 Nov 1996	Holden Australian Open (5)	−8 (67-73-71-69=280)	8 strokes	(Australia) Wayne Grady
33	8 Feb 1998	Greg Norman Holden International	−16 (68-73-64-67=272)	2 strokes	(Spain) José María Olazábal

PGA Tour of Australasia playoff record (1–2)

No.	Year	Tournament	Opponent	Result
1	1983	National Panasonic New South Wales Open	(Australia) David Graham	Won with par on second extra hole
2	1988	Australian PGA Championship	(Australia) Wayne Grady	Lost to par on fourth extra hole
3	1997	Holden Australian Open	(England) Lee Westwood	Lost to par on fourth extra hole

=== Other wins (19) ===
No.	Date	Tournament	Winning score	Margin of victory	Runner(s)-up
1	17 Apr 1977	Kuzuha International	−5 (69-66=135)	2 strokes	(Japan) Kikuo Arai
2	16 Sep 1978	Gilbey's Gin South Seas Classic	E (73-71-73-71=288)	Playoff	(United States) Sandy Galbraith
3	12 Oct 1980	Suntory World Match Play Championship	1 up		(Scotland) Sandy Lyle
4	18 Sep 1983	Cannes Open	−1 (69-74-72-72=287)	2 strokes	(United States) Corey Pavin
5	9 Oct 1983	Suntory World Match Play Championship (2)	3 and 2		(England) Nick Faldo
6	6 Nov 1983	Kapalua International	−16 (67-69-65-67=268)	6 strokes	(United States) Ben Crenshaw, (United States) Scott Simpson, (United States) Lanny Wadkins
7	28 Apr 1985	Australian Skins Challenge	$225,000	$30,000	(United States) Tom Watson
8	1 Sep 1986	PGA Grand Slam of Golf	−2 (70)	2 strokes	(United States) Fuzzy Zoeller
9	5 Oct 1986	Suntory World Match Play Championship (3)	2 and 1		(Scotland) Sandy Lyle
10	19 Aug 1986	Fred Meyer Challenge (with (South Africa) Gary Player)	−8 (64)	Shared title with (United States) Peter Jacobsen and (United States) Curtis Strange	
11	17 Nov 1993	PGA Grand Slam of Golf (2)	+1 (71-74=145)	2 strokes	(United States) Paul Azinger
12	9 Nov 1994	PGA Grand Slam of Golf (3)	−2 (70-66=136)	3 strokes	(Zimbabwe) Nick Price
13	22 Aug 1995	Fred Meyer Challenge (2) (with (United States) Brad Faxon)	−13 (65-64=129)	Playoff	(United States) Paul Azinger and (United States) Payne Stewart
14	20 Aug 1996	Fred Meyer Challenge (3) (with (United States) Brad Faxon)	−18 (63-61=124)	1 stroke	(United States) Mark Calcavecchia and (United States) Billy Mayfair
15	5 Jan 1997	Andersen Consulting World Championship of Golf	1 up		(United States) Scott Hoch
16	25 Jul 1997	Telus Skins Game	$275,000	$225,000	(United States) Fred Couples
17	5 Aug 1997	Fred Meyer Challenge (4) (with (United States) Brad Faxon)	−19 (60-63=123)	3 strokes	(United States) Jay Haas and (United States) Phil Mickelson
18	15 Nov 1998	Franklin Templeton Shark Shootout (with (Australia) Steve Elkington)	−27 (67-64-58=189)	Playoff	(United States) John Cook and (United States) Peter Jacobsen
19	25 Nov 2001	Skins Game	$1,000,000	$1,000,000	(Scotland) Colin Montgomerie, (Sweden) Jesper Parnevik, (United States) Tiger Woods

Other playoff record (3–1)

No.	Year	Tournament	Opponent(s)	Result
1	1978	Gilbey's Gin South Seas Classic	(United States) Sandy Galbraith	Won with par on third extra hole
2	1992	Johnnie Walker World Golf Championship	(England) Nick Faldo	Lost to par on first extra hole
3	1995	Fred Meyer Challenge (with (United States) Brad Faxon)	(United States) Paul Azinger and (United States) Payne Stewart	Won with birdie on first extra hole
4	1998	Franklin Templeton Shark Shootout (with (Australia) Steve Elkington)	(United States) John Cook and (United States) Peter Jacobsen	Won with birdie on third extra hole

== Major championships ==
=== Wins (2) ===
Year	Championship	54 holes	Winning score	Margin	Runner-up
1986	The Open Championship	1 shot lead	E (74-63-74-69=280)	5 strokes	(England) Gordon J. Brand
1993	The Open Championship (2)	1 shot deficit	−13 (66-68-69-64=267)	2 strokes	(England) Nick Faldo

=== Results timeline ===
Tournament	1977	1978	1979
Masters Tournament			
U.S. Open			T48
The Open Championship	CUT	T29	T10
PGA Championship			

Tournament	1980	1981	1982	1983	1984	1985	1986	1987	1988	1989
Masters Tournament		4	T36	T30	T25	T47	T2	T2	T5	T3
U.S. Open		T33		T50	2	T15	T12	T51	WD	T33
The Open Championship	CUT	T31	T27	T19	T6	T16	1	T35		T2
PGA Championship		T4	T5	T42	T39	CUT	2	70	T9	T12

Tournament	1990	1991	1992	1993	1994	1995	1996	1997	1998	1999
Masters Tournament	CUT	CUT	T6	T31	T18	T3	2	CUT	CUT	3
U.S. Open	T5	WD		CUT	T6	2	T10	CUT		CUT
The Open Championship	T6	T9	18	1	T11	T15	T7	T36		6
PGA Championship	T19	T32	T15	2	T4	T20	T17	T13		CUT

Tournament	2000	2001	2002	2003	2004	2005	2006	2007	2008	2009
Masters Tournament	T11	CUT	T36							CUT
U.S. Open	CUT		T59							
The Open Championship			T18	T18	CUT	T60			T3	CUT
PGA Championship	CUT	T29	T53	CUT						

Win
Top 10
Did not play

CUT = missed the halfway cut (3rd round cut in 1977 and 1980 Open Championships)
WD = withdrew
"T" indicates a tie for a place.

=== Summary ===
Tournament	Wins	2nd	3rd	Top-5	Top-10	Top-25	Events	Cuts made
Masters Tournament	0	3	3	8	9	12	23	17
U.S. Open	0	2	0	3	5	7	19	13
The Open Championship	2	1	1	4	10	17	27	23
PGA Championship	0	2	0	5	6	12	22	18
Totals	2	8	4	20	30	48	91	71

- Most consecutive cuts made: 18 (1981 Masters – 1985 Open Championship)
- Longest streak of top-10s: 3 (three times)

== The Players Championship ==
=== Wins (1) ===
Year	Championship	54 holes	Winning score	Margin	Runner-up
1994	The Players Championship	4 shot lead	−24 (63-67-67-67=264)	4 strokes	(United States) Fuzzy Zoeller

=== Results timeline ===
Tournament	1983	1984	1985	1986	1987	1988	1989	1990	1991	1992	1993	1994	1995	1996	1997	1998	1999	2000	2001	2002	2003	2004
The Players Championship	T63	CUT	T49	T33	T4	T11	T4	T16	T63	T35	T3	1	T37	CUT	T53		CUT	T53	CUT	CUT	WD	T81

Win
Top 10
Did not play

CUT = missed the halfway cut
WD = withdrew
"T" indicates a tie for a place.

== Results in World Golf Championships ==
Tournament	1999	2000	2001	2002
Match Play	R32	R64		
Championship			NT^{1}	
Invitational	T25	T31	35	T55

^{1}Cancelled due to 9/11

Did not play

QF, R16, R32, R64 = round in which player lost in match play
"T" = tied
NT = no tournament

== Results in senior major championships ==
Tournament	2005	2006	2007	2008	2009	2010	2011	2012
Senior PGA Championship				T6	T49			
Senior Players Championship								T53
U.S. Senior Open	4			4	T4			
Senior British Open Championship	3			T5	T6			CUT

Top 10
Did not play

CUT = missed the halfway cut
"T" indicates a tie for a place
Note: Norman never played in The Tradition.

== Team appearances ==
Amateur

- Australian Men's Interstate Teams Matches (representing Queensland): 1973, 1974

Professional

- World Cup (representing Australia): 1976, 1978
- Hennessy Cognac Cup (representing the Rest of the World): 1982
- Dunhill Cup (representing Australia): 1985 (winners), 1986 (winners), 1987, 1988, 1989, 1990, 1992, 1994, 1995, 1996
- Four Tours World Championship (representing Australasia): 1985, 1986, 1987, 1989
- Presidents Cup (International team): 1996, 1998 (winners), 2000, 2009 (non-playing captain)
- Alfred Dunhill Challenge (representing Australasia): 1995
- Wendy's 3-Tour Challenge (representing PGA Tour): 1993, 1994 (winners)

== See also ==
- List of golf courses designed by Greg Norman
- List of celebrities who own wineries and vineyards
- List of golfers with most European Tour wins
- List of golfers with most PGA Tour wins
- List of men's major championships winning golfers
- The Vintage Golf Course
