= Mark Pfeil =

American professional golfer (born 1951)

Personal information
- Nationality: United States
- Born: July 18, 1951 (age 75) Chicago Heights, Illinois, U.S.
- Height: 6 ft 0 in (1.83 m)
- Weight: 185 lb (84 kg; 13.2 st)

Career
- Sport: Golf
- College: University of Southern California
- Turned professional: 1974
- Former tours: PGA Tour; Champions Tour
- Professional wins: 4

Number of wins by tour
- PGA Tour: 1

Best results in major championships
- Masters Tournament: CUT: 1974, 1981
- PGA Championship: T22: 1982
- U.S. Open: CUT: 1979, 1986, 1993
- The Open Championship: CUT: 1975

Mark Pfeil (born July 18, 1951) is an American professional golfer who played on the PGA Tour and the Champions Tour.

== Early life and amateur career ==
Pfeil was born in Chicago Heights, Illinois. He attended the University of Southern California, where he was a two-time All-American as a member of the golf team — third-team in 1973 and second-team in 1974. While playing for the Trojans, Pfeil and his teammates, including future Masters champion Craig Stadler, lead them to a seventh-place finish at the NCAA Championship in 1973, and a fourth-place finish a year later. Pfeil was a member of the 1973 Walker Cup team.

== Professional career ==
Pfeil turned professional in 1974. He joined the PGA Tour in 1976 after his success at Fall 1975 PGA Tour Qualifying School. He had twelve top-10 finishes over the course of his career, including a win at the 1980 Tallahassee Open. His best finish in a major was T-22 at the 1982 PGA Championship. His best year was 1984, when he finished 69th on the money list with $101,878. In his forties, he accepted an assistant coaching position at USC and was involved in corporate golf exhibitions, mainly for Toyota.

After turning 50 in July 2001, Pfeil began play on the Champions Tour. His best finish in this venue was T-10 at the 2002 NFL Golf Classic.

Pfeil also holds the course record (59) at Palos Verdes Golf Club (par-71).

== Personal life ==
Pfeil lives in Palos Verdes Estates, California.

== Amateur wins ==
- 1972 Pacific Coast Amateur
- 1973 Southern California Amateur
- 1974 PAC-8 Conference Championship (individual), Pacific Coast Amateur

== Professional wins (4) ==
=== PGA Tour wins (1) ===
No.	Date	Tournament	Winning score	Margin of victory	Runners-up
1	Apr 20, 1980	Tallahassee Open	−11 (69-66-71-71=277)	2 strokes	(United States) Mark Lye, (United States) Bill Rogers

=== Other wins (3) ===
- 1976 Spalding Invitational
- 1983 Anderson-Pacific Classic
- 1985 Jerry Ford Invitational

== Results in major championships ==
Tournament	1974	1975	1976	1977	1978	1979
Masters Tournament	CUT					
U.S. Open						CUT
The Open Championship		CUT				
PGA Championship						

Tournament	1980	1981	1982	1983	1984	1985	1986	1987	1988	1989
Masters Tournament		CUT								
U.S. Open							CUT			
The Open Championship										
PGA Championship	T50		T22	T30		T40				

Tournament	1990	1991	1992	1993
Masters Tournament				
U.S. Open				CUT
The Open Championship				
PGA Championship				

Did not play

CUT = missed the half-way cut
"T" indicates a tie for a place

== U.S. national team appearances ==
Amateur

- Walker Cup: 1973 (winners)

== See also ==
- Fall 1975 PGA Tour Qualifying School graduates
- Fall 1976 PGA Tour Qualifying School graduates
