= Jediah Morgan =

Australian professional golfer

Personal information
- Nationality: Australia
- Born: 30 November 1999 (age 26) Brisbane, Australia
- Height: 6 ft 0 in (183 cm)
- Weight: 192 lb (87 kg)

Career
- Sport: Golf
- Turned professional: 2021
- Current tours: Asian Tour; PGA Tour of Australasia
- Former tour: LIV Golf
- Professional wins: 1

Number of wins by tour
- PGA Tour of Australasia: 1

Best results in major championships
- Masters Tournament: DNP
- PGA Championship: DNP
- U.S. Open: CUT: 2022
- The Open Championship: CUT: 2022

Achievements and awards
- PGA Tour of Australasia Order of Merit winner: 2021–22

Jediah Morgan (born 30 November 1999) is an Australian professional golfer who currently plays on the PGA Tour of Australasia and the Asian Tour. He won the Fortinet Australian PGA Championship in 2022 and also won the 2021–22 PGA Tour of Australasia Order of Merit.

== Amateur career ==
In January 2020, Morgan won the Australian Amateur, beating Northern Irishman Tom McKibbin 5 and 3 in the final.

== Professional career ==
Morgan turned professional in October 2021. He finished second in the inaugural Sandbelt Invitational in December 2021, finishing six shots behind Brady Watt.

In January 2022, Morgan won the Fortinet Australian PGA Championship, in just his fourth start as a professional. He won by a record eleven shots ahead of Andrew Dodt and also broke the aggregate scoring record with a total of 262. He also became the youngest winner in the tournament's history. With this win, it was good enough to see Morgan claim the PGA Tour of Australasia Order of Merit for the 2021–22 season.

== Amateur wins ==
- 2016 NSW Junior State Championship
- 2017 NT Amateur, Singapore Junior Championship, Queensland Boys Amateur, NSW Junior State Championship
- 2020 Australian Amateur

== Professional wins (1) ==
=== PGA Tour of Australasia wins (1) ===
Legend
Flagship events (1)
Other PGA Tour of Australasia (0)

No.	Date	Tournament	Winning score	Margin of victory	Runner-up
1	16 Jan 2022	Fortinet Australian PGA Championship	−22 (65-63-65-69=262)	11 strokes	(Australia) Andrew Dodt

== Results in major championships ==
Tournament	2022
Masters Tournament	
PGA Championship	
U.S. Open	CUT
The Open Championship	CUT

Did not play

CUT = missed the half-way cut

== Team appearances ==
- Australian Men's Interstate Teams Matches (representing Queensland): 2017, 2018, 2019
