= Concord Golf Club =

Golf club in New South Wales, Australia

Coordinates: 33.8500°S 151.0974°E

Club information
- Location: Majors Bay Road Concord, New South Wales
- Established: 1899
- Type: Private
- Tota holes: 18
- Tournaments: Women's Australian Open

The Concord Golf Club is a golf club in Concord, New South Wales, Australia, a suburb of Sydney. It hosted the Women's Australian Open in 2004 with the champion being Laura Davies from England. The clubhouse was designed by Thomas Pollard Sampson, a member, in 1921. Whilst substantially added to in the 2000s the original building remains intact internally.

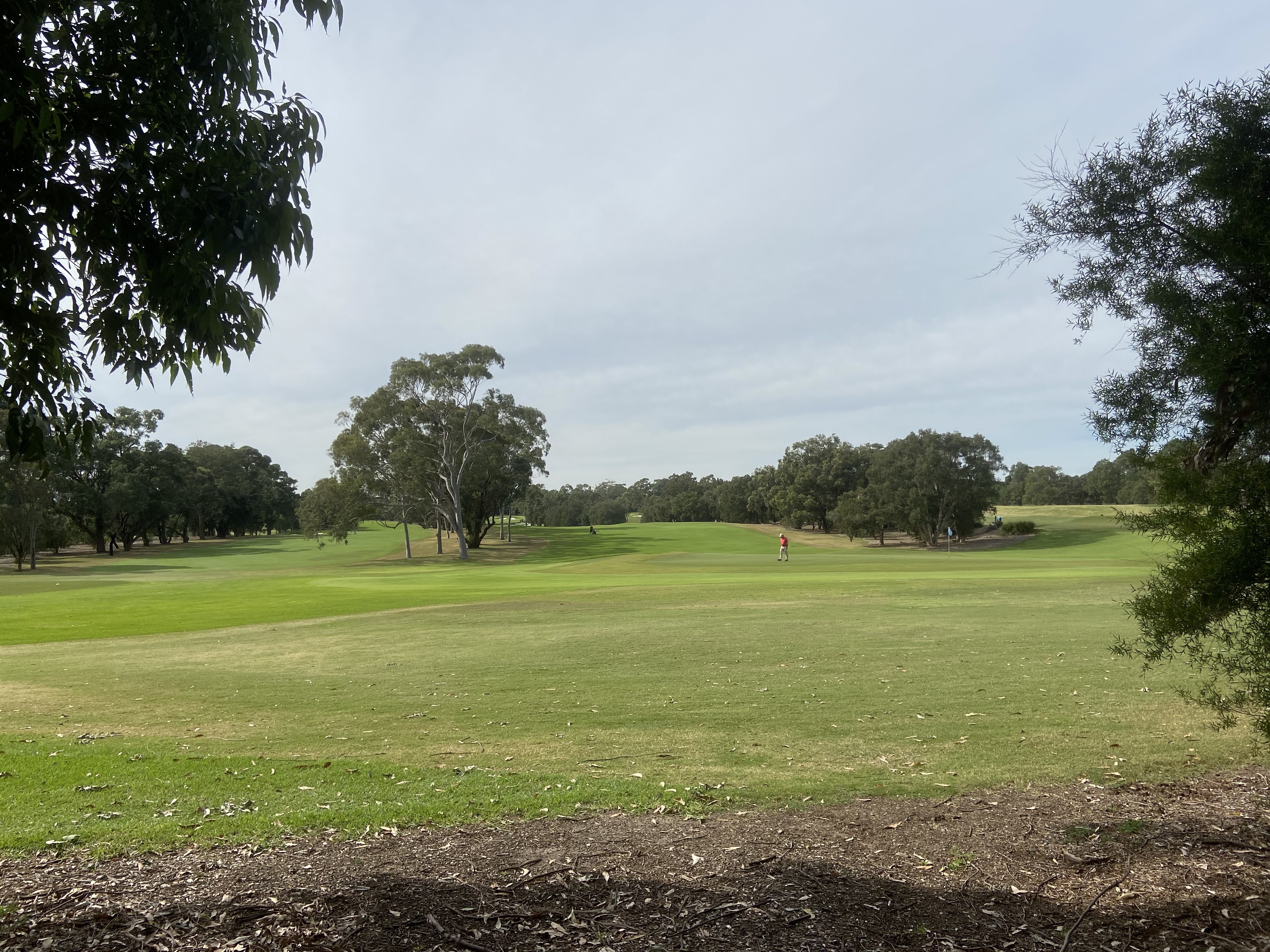
Concord Golf Club Sydney NSW. Western end
