= The Vintage Golf Course =

Coordinates: 32°44′7.88″S 151°19′24.43″E

- Interactive map of The Vintage Golf Course

The Vintage is a golf resort in Rothbury the Hunter Valley New South Wales, Australia a two-hour drive from Sydney. It has an 18-hole Championship golf course designed by golfer and course designer Greg Norman.

The resort has a $5 million clubhouse, a fitness center, 44 Grand Mecure apartments and the Chateaux Elan hotel. The resort was developed by American entrepreneur Don Panoz and Australian business manager John Stevens. Panoz owns other golf resorts in the US, including Chateau Elan in Georgia and the Diablo Grande. The Vintage is home to the NSW Open Golf Championship, the final golf tournament of the Australasian Von Nida Tour.

The Vintage head golf professional is Richard Mercer.

== Expansion ==
Don Panoz brought with him to The Vintage, a vision of expansion and growth for the resort. The plans included a Day Spa to be completed by early 2009, a hotel and outdoor entertainment arena as well as another 9 hole golf course. The day spa was subject to delays awaiting approval by council and as a result was only completed in 2010. The Chateau Elan hotel and villas was also completed in late 2010. The Chateau Elan hotel was sold to the Beijing based Sunshine Insurance Group for more than $40 million in 2015.

== NSW Open ==
=== 2007 ===
The NSW Open was held for the first time at The Vintage in 2007, with a new innovative form, whereby a pro-am event is played on the weekend as well as the final two days of the tournament. The prize money in 2007 was $115,000 (AU).

=== 2008 ===
In 2008 the tournament grew in size and stature. The event was won by Aaron Townsend.

=== 2009 ===
In 2009 the NSW Open once again returned to The Vintage. The event was promoted to the PGA Tour of Australia, scheduled for the week preceding the Australian Open, from 26 November to 29 November.

== See also ==
- List of golf courses designed by Greg Norman
