= Manly Golf Club =

Private members club in Manly, New South Wales

- Interactive map of Manly Golf Club
- 33°47′15″S 151°16′37″E

Manly Golf Club is a private members club in Manly, New South Wales, Australia.

The Club facilities include a Peter Thomson & Ross Perrett designed golf course and heritage listed Clubhouse which plays host to a wide variety of events. The club is a previous host venue of NSW Open, Australian PGA Championship and the Women's Australian Open.

== Women's Australian Open winners ==
- 1977 Jan Stephenson – Australia
- 1978 Debbie Austin – United States

== See also ==
- List of golf courses in New South Wales
