= Victorian Women's Amateur Championship =

Amateur golf tournament

Tournament information
- Location: Victoria, Australia
- Established: 1900
- Format: Match play

Current champion
- (Australia) Jeneath Wong

The Victorian Women's Amateur Championship is the state amateur golf championship of Victoria, Australia. It has been played annually since 1900, except for the war years.

== Format ==
The event is a match play tournament. In 2021 and 2022 there were 16 qualifiers, the championship being played over two days with all matches over 18 holes. In 2020 the number of qualifiers was reduced to 8. Before 2020 there were 16 qualifiers with the event being played over three days with a 36-hole final.

Players qualify through the Port Phillip Open Amateur, which is played immediately before the championship. The Port Phillip Open Amateur is a 72-hole stroke-play tournament played at Commonwealth and Kingston Heath golf clubs.

== History ==
In 1894 the ladies of the Geelong and Melbourne clubs started an annual "Ladies Championship", to be played alternately on the two courses, the first event to be held at Geelong. The precise status of the event is unclear with some reports calling it the "Ladies' Championship of Victoria" and others the "Ladies' Championship of Australia". These early championships are generally treated as editions of the Australian Women's Amateur. The Australian Golf Union was formed in 1898 and organised their first championship meeting at Royal Sydney in 1899, the main event being the Australian Amateur. The 1899 championship meeting did not include a ladies event but in 1900, when it was held at Adelaide Golf Club, a ladies championship was arranged before the men's event. Evelyn Calder won and some sources referred to her as "the first lady champion of Australia".

The Geelong/Royal Melbourne championship continued to be played and became clearly established as the "Ladies' Championship of Victoria". It was still played alternately on the two courses but became a stroke-play event, over 54 holes. Nellie De Little won the championship in 1902, 1903 and 1906 with Clare Murphy also a repeat winner, in 1904 and 1905.

The Victorian Ladies' Golf Union was founded in 1906 and took over the event in 1907. It remained a 54-hole stroke play event until 1928 when it switched to match play. The only exception was in 1911 when a 36-hole qualifying stage was used, with the leading eight then playing match play. Nellie Gatehouse won the first VLGU championship in 1907 and also won in 1909, 1910, 1923 and 1927. Gladys Hay won three times, in 1914, 1920 and 1921. Other repeat winners were Edith Raleigh, who won in 1901 and 1912, and Violet Binnie who won in 1911 and 1913. There was only one playoff, in 1914, when Gladys Hay and Eileen Rutledge tied. Hay won an 18-hole playoff the following day.

From 1928 the championship became a match play event, the Australian Women's Amateur also changing the same year. It was initially match play only but 36-hole qualifying was introduced in 1931 with the leading eight advancing to the match play stage. Mona MacLeod won in 1928, the third of her five victories. She also won in 1925, 1926, 1932 and 1933. Susie Tolhurst won in 1929, 1930 and 1931 and, as Mrs Morpeth she won in 1935 and 1936, to match MacLeod's five wins in the championship. Her sister Shirley Tolhurst won in 1934, beating Susie in the final.

== Winners ==
Year	Winner	Score	Runner-up	Venue	Ref.
2022	Jeneath Wong	5 & 4	Abbie Teasdale	Royal Melbourne	
2021	Kelsey Bennett	3 & 2	Jeneath Wong	Peninsula Kingswood	
2020	Kirsten Rudgeley	3 & 2	Jeneath Wong	Metropolitan	
2019	Grace Kim	7 & 6	June Song	Kingston Heath	
2018	Maddison Hinson-Tolcha	5 & 4	Kirsten Rudgeley	Huntingdale	
2017	Stephanie Bunque	5 & 4	Grace Kim	Commonwealth	
2016	Alizza Hetherington	37 holes	Rebecca Kay	Woodlands	
2015	Hannah Green	3 & 2	Stephanie Bunque	Kingston Heath & Commonwealth	
2014	Shelly Shin	9 & 8	Koh Sock Hwee	Victoria	
2013	Su-Hyun Oh (2)	5 & 3	Minjee Lee	Kingston Heath & Commonwealth	
2012	Su-Hyun Oh	5 & 3	Minjee Lee	Yarra Yarra	
2011	Charlotte Thomas	4 & 3	Whitney Hillier	Kingston Heath & Commonwealth	
2010	Stacey Keating (2)	4 & 3	Joanna Charlton	Royal Melbourne	
2009	Alison Whittaker	1 up	Tilly Poulson	Moonah Links	
2008	Rebecca Flood	1 up	Grace Lennon	Peninsula (South)	
2007	Jessica Parker	2 & 1	Grace Lennon	Victoria	
2006	Stacey Keating	6 & 4	Bree Turnbull	Huntingdale	
2005	Emma Bennett	10 & 9	Rochelle Miles	Woodlands	
2004	Lisa Jean	4 & 3	Belinda Kerr	Commonwealth	
2003	Misun Cho	8 & 7	Wendy Berger	Yarra Yarra	
2002	Melanie Holmes-Smith	5 & 4	Sarah Kemp	Cranbourne	
2001	Vicky Uwland	8 & 7	Rebecca Fry	Woodlands	
2000	Nadina Taylor	2 & 1	Helen Gubbels	Peninsula (South)	
1999	Cherie Brynes	1 up	Lyndsay Wright	Royal Melbourne	
1998	Natalie Parkinson (2)	4 & 3	Nadina Taylor	Kingston Heath	
1997	Natalie Parkinson	3 & 2	Deborah Rix	Victoria	
1996	Torie O'Connor	5 & 4	Allison Wheelhouse	Huntingdale	
1995	Stacey Doggett	7 & 6	Torie O'Connor	Commonwealth	
1994	Debbie Sharp (2)	3 & 1	Vicky Uwland	Yarra Yarra	
1993	Ann Johnston	3 & 2	Kate MacIntosh	Metropolitan	
1992	Allison Wheelhouse	37 holes	Terri McKinnon	Kingston Heath	
1991	Helen Kight	4 & 3	Karen MacDonald	Royal Melbourne	
1990	Siohban Muldowney	8 & 7	Terri McKinnon	Woodlands	
1989	Wendy Doolan	5 & 4	Joanne Mills	Peninsula (South)	
1988	Debbie Sharp	10 & 8	Louise Briers	Royal Melbourne (West)	
1987	Diane Pavich	7 & 5	Donna Faneco	Victoria	
1986	Lindy Goggin (4)	37 holes	Donna Faneco	Commonwealth	
1985	Louise Briers	1 up	Sandra McCaw	Huntingdale	
1984	Jan Dale	8 & 7	Lauren Rees	Yarra Yarra	
1983	Sue Tonkin	6 & 4	Ann Howe	Kingston Heath	
1982	Sandra McCaw (3)	9 & 8	Jane Mennie	Metropolitan	
1981	Louise Briers	4 & 3	Maisie Mooney	Royal Melbourne (West)	
1980	Lindy Goggin (3)	4 & 3	Jane Lock	Woodlands	
1979	Jane Crafter	2 & 1	Louise Briers	Commonwealth	
1978	Jane Lock	2 & 1	Edwina Kennedy	Victoria	
1977	Louise Hawking	37 holes	Lindy Goggin	Huntingdale	
1976	Lindy Goggin (2)	3 & 2	Sandra McCaw	Metropolitan	
1975	Barbara Dillon	5 & 3	Marjorie Bennett	Yarra Yarra	
1974	Jane Lock	11 & 10	Sandra McCaw	Royal Melbourne (West)	
1973	Lindy Goggin	1 up	Dawn Macdonald	Kingston Heath	
1972	Sandra McCaw (2)	2 up	Bettine Burgess	Woodlands	
1971	Sandra Williams	8 & 6	Penny Pulz	Commonwealth	
1970	Robyn Dummett (2)	2 & 1	Lindy Jennings	Kingswood	
1969	Robyn Dummett	2 up	Heather Booth	Royal Melbourne (East)	
1968	Barbara Coulson	1 up	Nancye Bolton	Keysborough	
1967	Joan Fisher (8)	7 & 6	Mary Ensor	Southern	
1966	Bettine Burgess	5 & 4	Jan Law	Huntingdale	
1965	Joan Fisher (7)	4 & 3	Dawn Dehnert	Yarra Yarra	
1964	Joan Fisher (6)	8 & 7	June Gashler	Metropolitan	
1963	Margaret Masters (5)	8 & 6	Dawn Dehnert	Commonwealth	
1962	Margaret Masters (4)	7 & 5	Burtta Cheney	Woodlands	
1961	Margaret Masters (3)	5 & 4	Burtta Cheney	Royal Melbourne (East)	
1960	Joan Fisher (5)	9 & 7	Nancye Bolton	Kingston Heath	
1959	Margaret Masters (2)	10 & 9	Joan Fisher	Kingswood	
1958	Burtta Cheney (3)	6 & 5	Marion Dwyer	Huntingdale	
1957	Margaret Masters	1 up	Joan Fisher	Woodlands	
1956	Burtta Cheney (2)	1 up	Bettine Burgess	Victoria	
1955	Veronica Anstey	6 & 5	Janette Robertson	Metropolitan	
1954	Maxine Bishop (3)	9 & 8	Margaret Masters	Kingston Heath	
1953	Esther Gaillie	7 & 6	Joan Fletcher	Commonwealth	
1952	Maxine Bishop (2)	6 & 5	Judith Percy	Royal Melbourne	
1951	Maxine Bishop	10 & 8	June Anstee	Victoria	
1950	Meg Evans (2)	3 & 2	Marion Dwyer	Woodlands	
1949	Burtta Cheney	10 & 8	Nell Jamison	Huntingdale	
1948	Joan Fisher (4)	37 holes	Nell Smithett	Yarra Yarra	
1947	Joan Fisher (3)	4 & 2	Sheila Bowditch	Metropolitan	
1946	Joan Fisher (2)	3 & 2	Burtta Cheney	Kingston Heath	
1940–1945 No tournament due to World War II
1939	Joan Lewis	7 & 5	Burtta Cheney	Royal Melbourne (East)	
1938	Meg Evans	7 & 6	Marion Dwyer	Riversdale	
1937	Nell Hutton	1 up	Meg Evans	Kingston Heath	
1936	Susie Morpeth (5)	w/o	Mona MacLeod	Commonwealth	
1935	Susie Morpeth (4)	10 & 9	Marjorie Shaw	Victoria	
1934	Shirley Tolhurst	9 & 8	Susie Morpeth	Royal Melbourne (East)	
1933	Mona MacLeod (5)	9 & 8	Susie Tolhurst	Yarra Yarra	
1932	Mona MacLeod (4)	6 & 5	Nell Marrie	Royal Melbourne (West)	
1931	Susie Tolhurst (3)	3 & 1	Mona MacLeod	Metropolitan	
1930	Susie Tolhurst (2)	2 & 1	Cecily Lascelles	Kingston Heath	
1929	Susie Tolhurst	8 & 7	Mrs Wood	Victoria	
1928	Mona MacLeod (3)	3 & 2	Susie Tolhurst	Commonwealth	

Year	Winner	Score	Margin of victory	Runner(s)-up	Venue	Ref.
1927	Nellie Gatehouse (5)	258	4 strokes	Cecily Lascelles	Metropolitan	
1926	Mona MacLeod (2)	250	2 strokes	Nellie Gatehouse	Royal Melbourne	
1925	Mona MacLeod	253	3 strokes	Gladys Hay	Victoria	
1924	Alice McKay	254	6 strokes	Nellie Gatehouse	Metropolitan	
1923	Nellie Gatehouse (4)	261	3 strokes	Gladys Hay	Royal Melbourne	
1922	Cecily Lascelles	265	2 strokes	Mona MacLeod	Victoria	
1921	Gladys Hay (3)	260	2 strokes	Mona MacLeod	Metropolitan	
1920	Gladys Hay (2)	265	8 strokes	Nellie Gatehouse	Royal Melbourne	
1919	Caroline Austin	265	4 strokes	Mona MacLeod; Violet Yuille	Metropolitan	
1915–1918 No tournament due to World War I
1914	Gladys Hay	270	Playoff	Eileen Rutledge	Royal Melbourne	
1913	Violet Binnie (2)	282	2 strokes	Euphie Bell; Gladys Hay	Metropolitan	
1912	Edith Raleigh (2)	270	9 strokes	Beth Austin	Royal Melbourne	
1911	Violet Binnie	1 up		Gladys Hay	Metropolitan	
1910	Nellie Gatehouse (3)	253	25 strokes	Edith Raleigh	Royal Melbourne	
1909	Nellie Gatehouse (2)	262	3 strokes	Nancy Parbury	Victoria	
1908	Euphie Bell	268	2 strokes	Nellie Gatehouse	Royal Melbourne	
1907	Nellie Gatehouse	256	9 strokes	Edith Raleigh	Victoria	
Ladies' Championship of Victoria
1906	Nellie De Little (3)	283	7 strokes	Mrs Kennedy	Geelong	
1905	Clare Murphy (2)	292	31 strokes	Euphie Bell	Royal Melbourne	
1904	Clare Murphy	307	11 strokes	K Hope	Geelong	
1903	Nellie De Little (2)	276	5 strokes	Euphie Bell	Royal Melbourne	
1902	Nellie De Little	309	6 strokes	Edith Raleigh	Geelong	
1901	Edith Raleigh	327	17 strokes	Louise Shaw	Royal Melbourne	
1900	Julia Anderson	329	2 strokes	Euphie Bell	Geelong	

== See also ==
- Victorian Amateur Championship
- Australian Women's Interstate Teams Matches
