= Betty Kernot =

Australian golfer (1910–1984)

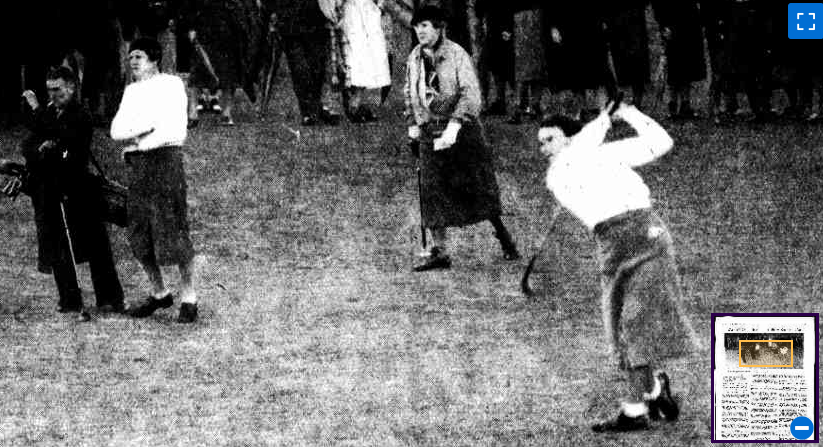
- Kernot playing a wood shot at the 1938 Australian women's amateur championships

Personal information
- Birth name: Edith Betty Kernot
- Born: 26 July 1910; Geelong, Victoria, Australia
- Died: 19 October 1984 (aged 74); Geelong, Victoria, Australia

Sport
- Sport: Golf

Achievements and titles
- National finals: Amateur champion (1937, 1938)

Edith Betty Kernot (26 July 1910 – 19 October 1984) was an Australian golfer. She was twice the Australian national women's amateur golf champion, in 1937 and 1938.

== Life ==
Kernot was born in Geelong. She was the last of three children born to Edith Latham (born Hobday) and Walter Charles Kernot. They were both active in the local community and her mother had also played golf. She began to play the game when she was thirteen and in 1925 she won the under-15 category nationally. After that she competed at state and national competitions.

In 1937 she first won the Australian Women's Amateur championship and she was also chosen to represent Australia in the four person team to contest the Tasman Cup with New Zealand. In August 1938 she retained the title of National Women's golf champion. The title dates from 1894 and only Evelyn MacKenzie, Nancy Parbury, Leonora Wray, Mona MacLeod, and Susie Morpeth had achieved that feat before of winning the title twice. Leonora Wray witnessed the event as she was there as an umpire. She played an exhibition match with the leading American golf celebrity player Babe Didrikson (later Zaharias) in 1938. Golf matches were cancelled due to the second world war. When matches restarted Kernot showed that she still had form. She reached the final of the 1947 Australian Women's Amateur, losing narrowly to the defending champion Joan Fisher, née Lewis. She had been the representative of Victoria at the Australian Ladies’ Golf Union in 1939 and she continued after the war in 1948.

The Tasman Cup resumed, after the war, at Invercargill in 1949 with Kernot as manager. Australia won after taking both the foursomes matches. She was the captain of the Tasman cup team for the 1950 match in Brisbane. It was played between the quarter and semi-finals of the Australian Women's Amateur. The match was a tie with each team winning a foursomes and two singles. The result was decided on holes ahead in the three matches, Australia winning by 11 holes to 9. At Auckland in 1951 she was again the captain. New Zealand led after the foursomes but her team won enough singles, to retain the cup. She was still captain in 1952 when the match in Melbourne resulted in a tie. Australia retaining the cup because they were the defending champions.

In 1955 she broke the course record at Geelong by three strokes. She was then President of the club and still a double national champion. In 1971 she suggested a new golf event. The South West Golf Association still (in 2024) hold the annual Women's Betty Kernot Knockout event.

Kernot continued to play golf until she died in Geelong in 1984.
