= Australian Women's Amateur =

Amateur golf tournament

Tournament information
- Location: Australia
- Established: 1894
- Format: Stroke play (from 2021)

Current champion
- (Australia) Jazy Roberts

The Australian Women's Amateur is the national amateur golf championship of Australia. It was first played in 1894 and is organised by Golf Australia. Having traditionally been a match play event, it became a 72-hole stroke play event in 2021, having last been played as a stroke play event in 1927.

== History ==
In 1894 the ladies of the Geelong and Melbourne clubs started an annual "Ladies Championship", to be played alternately on the two courses, the first event to be held at Geelong. The precise status of the event is unclear with some reports calling it the "Ladies' Championship of Victoria" and others the "Ladies' Championship of Australia". It was initially decided by a bogey competition over two rounds. Evelyn MacKenzie finished 9 down on bogey, two holes better than Jean Davie. McKenzie won again in 1895 at Royal Melbourne, this time a score of 1 up, and for a third time at Geelong in 1896, finishing 6 down but 12 holes better than anyone else. McKenzie did not complete in 1897 and Davie won the title. The format was changed to match-play in 1898 and was won by McKenzie who beat Ethel Guthrie in the final. In 1899 Louise Shaw won a close final at Royal Melbourne to win the title.

The Australian Golf Union was formed in 1898 and organised their first championship meeting at Royal Sydney in 1899, the main event being the Australian Amateur. The 1899 championship meeting did not include a ladies event but in 1900, when it was held at Adelaide Golf Club, a ladies championship was arranged before the men's event. It took the form of a 36-hole stroke-play event, played over two days. Evelyn Calder won with a score of 209, 23 strokes ahead of the runner-up, some sources referring to her as "the first lady champion of Australia". The Geelong/Royal Melbourne championship continued to be played and became clearly established as the "Ladies' Championship of Victoria" until the Victorian Ladies' Golf Union took over that event in 1907. The championship meeting returned to the Sydney area in 1901, being played at The Australian Golf Club. There was a separate ladies' championship meeting, held at Royal Sydney, starting immediately after the men's meeting, starting with a mixed foursomes event. Ethel Guthrie won the ladies championship with a score of 199. The 1902 championship meeting was held at Royal Melbourne for the first time, with the ladies championship following the men's events. The championship was extended to 54 holes and was won by Evelyn Calder. In 1903 the meeting returned to Adelaide Golf Club with the ladies championship played immediately before the men's event. Nellie De Little won with a score of 282.

In 1904 the men's championship meeting was held at The Australian Golf Club and included the first men's interstate team match and the first Australian Open. As in 1901, there was a separate ladies' championship meeting, held at Royal Sydney, although on this occasion it was held before the men's meeting. Mabel Trevor-Jones won the ladies championship by 10 strokes. From 1905 the ladies championship was played after the men's events, and the meeting eventually became known as "the open, amateur, and ladies' championship meeting" with the championships being played in that order. Myrtle Backhouse, a British visitor, won in 1905 with Elvie Whitesides from Tasmania winning in 1906. Leonora Wray had successive wins in 1907 and 1908 with Nellie Gatehouse taking the title in 1909. A different format was used in 1910 and 1911. There was a 36-hole qualifying stage after which the leading 8 played match-play, all matches being over 18 holes. Nancy Parbury won both times. The event returned to stroke-play in 1912 and resulted in a tie between Violet Binnie and Florence Fowler. The 18-hole playoff was very one-sided with Fowler conceding the match on the 15th hole. There was another Tasmanian winner in 1913, with Lucy Harrison taking the title.

The championship restarted in 1920 using the pre-war format of 54 holes of stroke-play. As previously it was played the week after the men's amateur championship. The Australian Ladies’ Golf Union was founded in 1921 and jointly ran the event with the Australian Golf Union. Eileen Hope Williams, from New Zealand, won the championship in 1920. Mona MacLeod won in 1921, by 14 strokes, and won again in 1926 and 1927. Other winners included Gladys Hay in 1922, Beth Newton Lees in 1924 and Nellie Gatehouse who won for a second time in 1925.

In 1928 the format was extended and the championship was separated from the AGU championship meeting. There was a 36-hole stroke-play stage with the leading 16 qualified for the match-play which finished with a 36-hole final. Mona MacLeod, the defending champion, led the qualifying but lost 9&8 to Nellie Gatehouse in the final, Gatehouse winning her third title. Leonora Wray won in 1929, having previously won in 1907 and 1908. Susie Tolhurst won in 1930 and 1931. In 1930 she led the qualifiers and went on to beat Jess Russell in a close final. In 1931 she met Mona MacLeod in the final, winning 7&6. Tolhurst led the qualifying in 1932 but the final saw MacLeod beating Russell 4&2. New Zealander Oliver Kay led the qualifying in 1933 and went on to win the title, beating Joan Hammond 9&8 in the final. Kay was part of the New Zealand team that was competing in the first Women's Tasman Cup. Kay and fellow New Zealander Bessie Gaisford led the qualifying in 1934 but Nin Robinson won the title after beating Gaisford in the final. Qualifying in 1935 was dominated by the British and Irish players who were touring Australia. They took 5 of the first 6 places, with only Susie Morpeth née Tolhurst, splitting them. Morpeth reached the final but lost to Pat Walker from Ireland. In 1936, two of the New Zealand team competing in the Women's Tasman Cup reached the final. Oliver Kay beat Bessie Fullerton-Smith 5&4. Betty Kernot won the title in 1937 and 1938, beating Burtta Cheney and Vedas Ebert. In 1939, Joan Lewis led the qualifying with Barbara Crago second. The two met in the final with Lewis winning 2&1.

The championship restarted in 1947. The 1939 champion, Joan Lewis, now Joan Fisher, beating the 1937 and 1938 champion, Betty Kernot, in the final. Pat Borthwick won in 1948 and 1949 having also led the qualifying both times. 19-year-old Janette Wellard won in 1950 and she was followed by Maxine Bishop in 1951, who beat Borthwick in a close final. Fisher won for the third time in 1952, beating Bishop in the final, while Borthwick won her third title in 1953. In 1954 Judith Percy won her first title, beating New Zealander Doreen Blundell in the final.

The players in 1955 included a British women's team that was touring Australia and New Zealand in the second half of the year, all aged between 18 and 21. One of them, Veronica Anstey won the championship, beating Joan Fletcher 10&9 in the final. Fletcher reached the final again in 1956 but lost to Pat Borthwick, who won her fourth title. In 1958 18-year-old New Zealander Nicki Campbell reached the final but lost to Margaret Masters. Two ex-champions reached the final in 1960, Judith Percy beating Borthwick by one hole. In 1961 18-year-old Beatrice Hayley beat Enid Hauritz 13&11, the largest winning margin in any final. Percy won for the third time in 1962, beating Masters 6&4.

In 1963 a number of overseas golfer competed, having played in the recent Commonwealth Trophy. Marlene Streit, a memberof the Canadian team, led the qualifying by 10 strokes and went on to win the title, beating one of the British team, Ruth Porter, 8&7 in the final. In 1964, 18-year-old Marea Hickey won the title and she won again in 1969. Gail Corry.won in 1965 and retained the title in 1966. Judy Perkins was another repeat winner, winning in 1967 and again in 1970. Lindy Goggin won in 1971, the first Tasmanian winner since 1913.

In 1972 Sandra McCaw won her first title beating Lindy Goggin in the final. The 1973 championship included a large number of overseas entries, playing in the five-nation Women's International Series the following week. Maisie Mooney, a member of the Great Britain and Ireland team, beat Jane Lock in the final. In 1974 the qualifying was extended to 72-holes for the first time, with a cut after two rounds. McCaw won the second time beating Lock in the final. The same format was retained in 1975. Lock lead the qualification stage and she went on to win the title. 1976 saw a repeat of 1975 with Lock leading the qualifying, this time by 9 strokes, and retaining the title. Lock failed to qualify in 1977, with Lindy Goggin and Jane Crafter leading the stroke-play. Goggin and Crafter met in the final, Goggin winning 4&2.

The format returned to the earlier system in 1978, with 32 qualifiers from a 36-hole stroke-play stage. Karen Permezel won the title. The 1979 championship was played soon after the Commonwealth Trophy, resulting in a larger than usual number of overseas entries. However two Australians, Jane Lock and Edwina Kennedy reached the final, Lock winning her third title, 4&3. Lindy Goggin won her third title in 1980, beating Dennise Hutton in the final. 19-year-old Corinne Dibnah won the title in 1981, although 17-year-old Diane Mancell had led the qualifying. The 1982 championship was preceded by a 6-team international pairs event won by Great Britain. The championship was won by Regine Lautens, a member of the Swiss team, who beat Goggin in the final. Sandra McCaw became another three-tine winner in 1983. 1983 was the last that the Australian junior title was contested during the qualifying stage of the championship. From 1984 it became a separate match-play event.

== Winners ==
Year	Winner	Score	To par	Margin of victory	Runner(s)-up	Venue	Ref.
2026	(Australia) Jazy Roberts	265	−27	6 strokes	(Japan) Anna Iwanaga	Western Australian & Wanneroo	
2025	(Australia) Rachel Lee	282	−9	3 strokes	(Australia) Sarah Hammett	Commonwealth & Cranbourne	
2024	(Japan) Mamika Shinchi	282	−10	2 strokes	(Australia) Amelia Harris	Yarra Yarra & Keysborough	
2023	(Japan) Mizuki Hashimoto	284	−11	1 stroke	(Japan) Saki Baba (Australia) Justice Bosio	New South Wales & St Michael's	
2022	(New Zealand) Fiona Xu	277	−11	3 strokes	(Australia) Justice Bosio	Cranbourne	
2021	(Australia) Grace Kim	285	−3	7 strokes	(Australia) Kirsten Rudgeley	Kooyonga	

Year	Winner	Score	Runner-up	Venue	Ref.
2020	(England) Charlotte Heath	7 and 6	(Indonesia) Mela Putri	Royal Queensland	
2019	(South Korea) Hong Yae-eun	3 and 2	(Japan) Tsubasa Kajitani	Woodlands	
2018	(Japan) Suzuka Yamaguchi	6 and 5	(South Korea) Cho A-yean	Lake Karrinyup	
2017	(South Korea) Choi Hye-jin	4 and 2	(South Korea) Lee So-mi	Yarra Yarra	
2016	(South Korea) Park Min-ji	6 and 5	(South Korea) Cho A-yean	Metropolitan	
2015	(Australia) Shelly Shin	8 and 7	(Australia) Lizzy Elmassian	The Australian	
2014	(Australia) Minjee Lee (2)	6 and 5	(Australia) Karis Davidson	The Grange	
2013	(Australia) Minjee Lee	6 and 5	(South Korea) Jenny Lee	Commonwealth	
2012	(New Zealand) Lydia Ko	4 and 3	(Australia) Breanna Elliott	Woodlands	
2011	(Australia) Ashlee Dewhurst	38 holes	(Australia) Minjee Lee	Victoria	
2010	(Australia) Stacey Keating	10 and 8	(New Zealand) Cecilia Cho	Lake Karrinyup	
2009	(Australia) Justine Lee	1 up	(Taiwan) Tsai Pei-Ying	Royal Queensland	
2008	(Australia) Kristie Smith	9 and 8	(Australia) Stacey Keating	Royal Adelaide	
2007	(Australia) Sunny Park	38 holes	(Australia) Emma Bennett	New South Wales	
2006	(Australia) Helen Oh	2 up	(South Korea) Haeji Kang	Lake Karrinyup	
2005	(Australia) Sarah Oh	8 and 7	(Australia) Sunny Park	Rydges Capricorn	
2004	(Australia) Marousa Polias	4 and 3	(Australia) Sarah Kemp	Tasmania	
2003	(Australia) Katy Jarochowicz	3 and 2	(South Korea) Misun Cho	Kooyonga	
2002	(Australia) Nikki Campbell	7 and 6	(Australia) Heidi McCulkin	Royal Sydney	
2001	(Australia) Helen Beatty	2 and 1	(Australia) Susie Mathews	Metropolitan	
2000	(Australia) Sandy Grimshaw	37 holes	(Australia) Natalie Parkinson	Mount Lawley	
1999	(Australia) Rebecca Stevenson	12 and 10	(Australia) Helen Beatty	Royal Queensland	
1998	(Australia) Michelle Ellis (2)	4 and 3	(Australia) Helen Beatty	Glenelg	
1997	(Australia) Michelle Ellis	1 up	(New Zealand) Renee Fowler	Royal Hobart	
1996	(Australia) Dayle Linnertson	1 up	(Australia) Tamie Durdin	Kingston Heath	
1995	(England) Julie Hall	7 and 6	(Australia) Helen Beatty	Newcastle	
1994	(Australia) Terri McKinnon	7 and 6	(Australia) Fiona Pike	Lake Karrinyup	
1993	(Australia) Anne-Marie Knight	2 up	(New Zealand) Gina Scott	Indooroopilly	
1992	(Australia) Jane Leary	10 and 9	(Australia) Fay Payne	Kooyonga	
1991	(Australia) Louise Briers	3 and 1	(Australia) Edwina Kennedy	Royal Melbourne	
1990	(Australia) Jane Shearwood	5 and 4	(Australia) Tracie Hale	Royal Hobart	
1989	(New Zealand) Jan Higgins	11 and 9	(Australia) Claire Elvidge	Mount Lawley	
1988	(France) Caroline Bourtayre	3 and 2	(England) Susan Shapcott	The Australian	
1987	(Australia) Liz Cavill	2 and 1	(Australia) Nicole Lowien	Royal Queensland	
1986	(Australia) Edwina Kennedy	5 and 4	(Australia) Ericka Maxwell	The Grange	
1985	(Australia) Helen Greenwood	2 up	(Australia) Donna Faneco	Peninsula	
1984	(Australia) Sandra McCaw (4)	8 and 6	(Australia) Edwina Kennedy	Tasmania	
1983	(Australia) Sandra McCaw (3)	1 up	(Australia) Jan Dale	Royal Perth	
1982	(Switzerland) Regine Lautens	6 and 5	(Australia) Lindy Goggin	Royal Canberra	
1981	(Australia) Corinne Dibnah	5 and 4	(Australia) Jan Dale	Royal Queensland	
1980	(Australia) Lindy Goggin (3)	3 and 2	(Australia) Dennise Hutton	Victoria	
1979	(Australia) Jane Lock (3)	4 and 3	(Australia) Edwina Kennedy	Royal Adelaide	
1978	(Australia) Karen Permezel	37 holes	(Australia) Louise Briers	Royal Hobart	
1977	(Australia) Lindy Goggin (2)	4 and 2	(Australia) Jane Crafter	Lake Karrinyup	
1976	(Australia) Jane Lock (2)	6 and 5	(New Zealand) Liz Douglas	The Australian	
1975	(Australia) Jane Lock	6 and 5	(Australia) Anne Alletson	Indooroopilly	
1974	(Australia) Sandra McCaw (2)	1 up	(Australia) Jane Lock	The Grange	
1973	(Republic of Ireland) Maisie Mooney	37 holes	(Australia) Jane Lock	Metropolitan	
1972	(Australia) Sandra McCaw	7 and 5	(Australia) Lindy Goggin	Barwon Heads	
1971	(Australia) Lindy Goggin	2 and 1	(Australia) Anne Kenny	Mount Lawley	
1970	(Australia) Judy Perkins (2)	7 and 6	(New Zealand) Heather Booth	Royal Sydney	
1969	(Australia) Marea Hickey (2)	5 and 4	(Australia) Judy Byrne	Royal Hobart	
1968	(Australia) Betty Dalgleish	3 and 2	(Australia) Anne Kenny	Royal Queensland	
1967	(Australia) Judy Perkins	7 and 6	(Australia) Heather Kerr	Royal Adelaide	
1966	(Australia) Gail Corry (2)	37 holes	(New Zealand) Heather Booth	Commonwealth	
1965	(Australia) Gail Corry	4 and 3	(Australia) Dianna Thomas	Royal Perth	
1964	(Australia) Marea Hickey	5 and 4	(Australia) Joan Fisher	Kingston Beach	
1963	(Canada) Marlene Streit	8 and 7	(England) Ruth Porter	Royal Sydney	
1962	(Australia) Judith Percy (3)	6 and 4	(Australia) Margaret Masters	Glenelg	
1961	(Australia) Beatrice Hayley	13 and 11	(Australia) Enid Hauritz	Royal Queensland	
1960	(Australia) Judith Percy (2)	1 up	(Australia) Pat Borthwick	Royal Sydney	
1959	(Australia) Eileen Dawson	9 & 8	(Australia) Jean Windsor	Royal Perth	
1958	(Australia) Margaret Masters	6 & 5	(New Zealand) Nicki Campbell	Royal Melbourne	
1957	(Australia) Burtta Cheney	1 up	(Australia) June Gillespie	Royal Adelaide	
1956	(Australia) Pat Borthwick (4)	2 and 1	(Australia) Joan Fletcher	Kingston Beach	
1955	(England) Veronica Anstey	10 and 9	(Australia) Joan Fletcher	The Australian	
1954	(Australia) Judith Percy	5 and 4	(New Zealand) Doreen Blundell	Brisbane	
1953	(Australia) Pat Borthwick (3)	6 and 4	(Australia) June Anstee	Royal Perth	
1952	(Australia) Joan Fisher (3)	7 and 5	(Australia) Maxine Bishop	Kingston Heath	
1951	(Australia) Maxine Bishop	2 up	(Australia) Pat Borthwick	Kooyonga	
1950	(Australia) Janette Wellard	6 and 4	(Australia) Enid Clements	Royal Queensland	
1949	(Australia) Pat Borthwick (2)	2 and 1	(Australia) Maxine Bishop	Royal Sydney	
1948	(Australia) Pat Borthwick	5 and 4	(Australia) Joan Fletcher	Commonwealth	
1947	(Australia) Joan Fisher (2)	2 and 1	(Australia) Betty Kernot	Royal Adelaide	
1940–1946 No tournament due to World War II
1939	(Australia) Joan Lewis	2 and 1	(Australia) Barbara Crago	Kooyonga	
1938	(Australia) Betty Kernot (2)	7 and 6	(Australia) Vedas Ebert	The Australian	
1937	(Australia) Betty Kernot	6 and 5	(Australia) Burtta Cheney	Metropolitan	
1936	(New Zealand) Oliver Kay (2)	5 and 4	(New Zealand) Bessie Fullerton-Smith	Royal Adelaide	
1935	(Republic of Ireland) Pat Walker	4 and 3	(Australia) Susie Morpeth	Royal Melbourne	
1934	(Australia) Nin Robinson	4 and 3	(New Zealand) Bessie Gaisford	Royal Sydney	
1933	(New Zealand) Oliver Kay	9 and 8	(Australia) Joan Hammond	Victoria	
1932	(Australia) Mona MacLeod (4)	4 and 2	(Australia) Jess Russell	Kooyonga	
1931	(Australia) Susie Tolhurst (2)	7 and 6	(Australia) Mona MacLeod	The Australian	
1930	(Australia) Susie Tolhurst	1 up	(Australia) Jess Russell	Commonwealth	
1929	(Australia) Leonora Wray (3)	1 up	(Australia) Susie Tolhurst	Royal Adelaide	
1928	(Australia) Nellie Gatehouse (3)	9 and 8	(Australia) Mona MacLeod	Royal Sydney	

Year	Winner	Score	Margin of victory	Runner(s)-up	Venue	Ref.
1927	(Australia) Mona MacLeod (3)	249	6 strokes	(Australia) Jess Russell	Royal Melbourne	
1926	(Australia) Mona MacLeod (2)	241	8 strokes	(Australia) Susie Tolhurst	Royal Adelaide	
1925	(Australia) Nellie Gatehouse (2)	253	8 strokes	(Australia) Mona MacLeod	The Australian	
1924	(Australia) Beth Newton Lees	251	4 strokes	(Australia) Violet Yuille	Royal Melbourne	
1923	(Australia) Lilian Gordon	273	1 stroke	(Australia) Nellie Gatehouse	Royal Adelaide	
1922	(Australia) Gladys Hay	268	5 strokes	(Australia) Violet Betheras (Australia) Leonora Wray	Royal Sydney	
1921	(Australia) Mona MacLeod	259	14 strokes	(Australia) Violet Betheras (Australia) Gladys Hay (Australia) Violet Yuille	Royal Melbourne	
1920	(New Zealand) Eileen Hope Williams	261	4 strokes	(Australia) Nellie Gatehouse	The Australian	
1914–1919 No tournament due to World War I
1913	(Australia) Lucy Harrison	269	5 strokes	(Australia) Violet Binnie	Royal Melbourne	
1912	(Australia) Violet Binnie	280	Playoff	(Australia) Florence Fowler	Royal Melbourne	
1911	(Australia) Nancy Parbury (2)	5 and 3		(Australia) Winifred Duret	Royal Sydney	
1910	(Australia) Nancy Parbury	7 and 5		(Australia) Florence Fowler	Royal Adelaide	
1909	(Australia) Nellie Gatehouse	258	11 strokes	(Australia) Nancy Parbury	Royal Melbourne	
1908	(Australia) Leonora Wray (2)	268	12 strokes	(Australia) Nancy Parbury	The Australian	
1907	(Australia) Leonora Wray	268	12 strokes	(Australia) Nancy Parbury	Royal Melbourne	
1906	(Australia) Elvie Whitesides	282	5 strokes	(Australia) Mabel Trevor-Jones	Royal Sydney	
1905	(England) Myrtle Backhouse	299	3 strokes	(New Zealand) Eileen Hope Lewis	Royal Melbourne	
1904	(Australia) Mabel Trevor-Jones	272	10 strokes	(Australia) Ruby Lethbridge	Royal Sydney	
1903	(Australia) Nellie De Little	282	5 strokes	(Australia) Florence Ayers	Adelaide	
1902	(Australia) Evelyn Calder (2)	299	2 strokes	(Australia) Mrs Fairbairn	Royal Melbourne	
1901	(Australia) Ethel Guthrie	199	7 strokes	(Australia) Mrs Fairfax	Royal Sydney	
1900	(Australia) Evelyn Calder	209	23 strokes	(Australia) Euphie Bell	Adelaide	
Ladies' Championship
1899	(Australia) Louise Shaw	1 up		(Australia) Julia Anderson	Royal Melbourne	
1898	(Australia) Evelyn MacKenzie (4)	3 and 1		(Australia) Ethel Guthrie	Geelong	
1897	(Australia) Jean Davie	square	11 holes	(Australia) Ethel Guthrie	Royal Melbourne	
1896	(Australia) Evelyn MacKenzie (3)	6 down	12 holes	(Australia) Evelyn Calder	Geelong	
1895	(Australia) Evelyn MacKenzie (2)	1 up	5 holes	(Australia) Josephine Yencken	Royal Melbourne	
1894	(Australia) Evelyn MacKenzie	9 down	2 holes	(Australia) Jean Davie	Geelong	

== Stroke-play qualifying ==
Stroke-play qualifying was first used in 1910 and 1911 when the championship was first decided by match play. 36 holes were played over two days with the leading eight qualifying. Nellie Gatehouse led with a score of 161. Nancy Parbury led in 1911 with a score of 170 and went on to win the championship.

Stroke-play qualifying was again used when the championship again became a match play event in 1928. The leading 16 players qualified. A seeded draw, based on the position in the qualifying, was introduced in 1948. The number of qualifier was increased to 32 for the 1955 and 1958 events, but otherwise the number remained at 16 until 1961 when it was increased to 32. In 1964 and 1965 the number of qualifiers was reduced to 16, returning to 32 in 1966. In 1972, the stroke-play stage was extended to 72 holes to give players more practise for the forthcoming Espirito Santo Trophy. Qualifying was still based on scores at the 36-hole stage, with 16 players advancing to the match-play stage. In 1973 the number of qualifiers returned to 32.

From 1974 to 1977 the qualifying was extended to 72-holes, with a cut after two rounds. 16 players advanced to the match-play. From 1978 the format returned to the earlier system with 32 qualifiers from a 36-hole stroke-play stage. From 2008 to 2011 qualification was based on the result of the Australian Women's Amateur Stroke Play Championship but that event was discontinued after 2011 and 36-hole qualifying was reintroduced in 2012. The leading qualifier received the Una Clift bowl.

- 2020 Emily Toy (136)
- 2019 Doey Choi, Sae Ogura, Yuri Yoshida+ (140)
- 2018 Cho A-yean (137)
- 2017 Choi Hye-jin (136)
- 2016 Minami Katsu (142)
- 2015 Lee So-young (143)
- 2014 Lee So-young (138)
- 2013 Lydia Ko, Grace Lennon+ (140)
- 2012 Breanna Elliott (145)
- 2008 to 2011 - replaced by the Australian Women's Amateur Stroke Play Championship
- 2007 Sarah Oh+, and others (143)
- 2006 Frances Bondad (141)
- 2005 Anna Parsons (144)
- 2004 Katy Jarochowicz (145)
- 2003 Sarah Kemp (146)
- 2002 Rebecca Coakley (143)
- 2001 Nadina Taylor (143)
- 2000 Anna Rawson (147)
- 1999 Anna Rawson (144)
- 1998 Michelle Ellis (147)
- 1997 Melissa Fraser (143)
- 1996 Tamie Durdin (149)
- 1995 Lisa Walton (147)
- 1994 Tanya Holl, Terri McKinnon+, Gina Scott (152)
- 1993 Joanne Mills (143)
- 1992 Loraine Lambert (152)
- 1991 Louise Briers (153)
- 1990 Louise Briers, Terri McKinnon+ (149)
- 1989 Wendy Doolan+, Jan Higgins (154)
- 1988 Helene Andersson (153)
- 1987 Cheryl Cowie (149)
- 1986 Louise Briers, Brenda Ormsby+ (148)
- 1985 Sandra McCaw (150)
- 1984 Helen Hopkins+, Sandra McCaw, Louise Mullard (154)
- 1983 Lindy Goggin (149)
- 1982 Edwina Kennedy (149)
- 1981 Diane Mancell (148)
- 1980 Sandra McCaw (148)
- 1979 Louise Briers, Jane Crafter, Lindy Goggin+, Jane Lock (152)
- 1978 Carole Blair, Jill Miles+ (149)
- 1977 Jane Crafter+, Lindy Goggin (309)
- 1976 Jane Lock (307)
- 1975 Jane Lock (298)
- 1974 Liz Cavill (316)
- 1973 Takako Kiyomoto (152)
- 1972 Gayle Gannon, Dawn Macdonald+ (152)
- 1971 Rhys Wright (153)
- 1970 Elizabeth Blackmore+, Dianna Thomas (160)
- 1969 Heather Booth (143)
- 1968 Anne Kenny (149)
- 1967 Beatrice Turner (157)
- 1966 Carol Blair+, Dianna Thomas (155)
- 1965 Dianna Thomas (153)
- 1964 Joan Fletcher (159)
- 1963 Marlene Streit (146)
- 1962 Margaret Masters (149)
- 1961 Judith Percy (156)
- 1960 Pat Borthwick (159)
- 1959 Eileen Dawson+, Helen Stockman (157)
- 1958 Joan Fletcher+, Pam Main (152)
- 1957 Rhonda Watson (153)
- 1956 Joan Fletcher, Mardie Mair+ (152)
- 1955 June Gillespie+, Mardie Mair (156)
- 1954 June Gillespie (155)
- 1953 Esther Gaillie (158)
- 1952 Judith Percy (147)
- 1951 Mary Wheatley (157)
- 1950 Zoe Hudson (164)
- 1949 Pat Borthwick (156)
- 1948 Pat Borthwick (155)
- 1947 Sheila Fisher, Marie Roskin (160)
- 1939 Joan Lewis (152)
- 1938 Bessie Fullerton-Smith (159)
- 1937 Shirley Tolhurst (164)
- 1936 Enid Clements, Oliver Kay (161)
- 1935 Jessie Anderson (161)
- 1934 Bessie Gaisford, Oliver Kay (161)
- 1933 Oliver Kay (157)
- 1932 Susie Tolhurst (168)
- 1931 Marion Bettington, Heather McCulloch (165)
- 1930 Susie Tolhurst (169)
- 1929 Hilda Britten-Jones (171)
- 1928 Mona MacLeod (159)

+ Number one seed.

== See also ==
- Australian Women's Amateur Stroke Play Championship
- Australian Amateur
- Australian Women's Interstate Teams Matches
