= Norman Belcher =

Australian rules footballer (1879–1947)

Personal information
- Full name: Edward Norman Belcher
- Nickname: Norm
- Born: 10 July 1879; Leopold, Victoria
- Died: 31 January 1947 (aged 67); Geelong, Victoria
- Original team: Newtown
- Height: 182 cm (6 ft 0 in)
- Weight: 77 kg (170 lb)

Playing career^{1}
Years	Club	Games (Goals)
1899, 1902, 1906	Geelong	8 (3)
1904	Essendon	2 (0)
Total		10 (3)
- ^{1} Playing statistics correct to the end of 1906.

Norman Belcher (10 July 1879 – 31 January 1947) was an Australian rules footballer who played with Geelong and Essendon in the Victorian Football League (VFL).

Belcher was the son of George Frederick Belcher (Mayor of Geelong) and attended Geelong Grammar School where he captained the school football team.

Belcher played two games for Geelong in 1899 before joining the army and serving with the Australian Commonwealth Horse mounted infantry unit in the Second Boer War. Upon his return in 1902, he again played for Geelong but transferred to Essendon for the 1904 VFL season. Despite positive reports, he failed to establish himself in the side and returned to Geelong. He played two more games for Geelong in the 1906 season.

When World War I commenced, Belcher was quick to offer his services (including his motor car). He served in the Automobile Corps from 1914 to 1916.

Outside football, Belcher established an auctioneer business in Geelong with his brother. An active sportsman, Belcher also served on the committees of the Geelong Racing Club and Geelong Golf Club. Norman Belcher died in 1947.
