= Francis Lombard =

American politician

Member-elect of the Connecticut House of Representatives from the 8th district
- Assuming office January 2027
- Succeeding: Tim Ackert

Personal details
- Party: Democratic

Francis Lombard is an American politician. A member of the Democratic Party, he is the member-elect for the 8th district of the Connecticut House of Representatives.
