= Hannah Green (golfer) =

Australian professional golfer (born 1996)

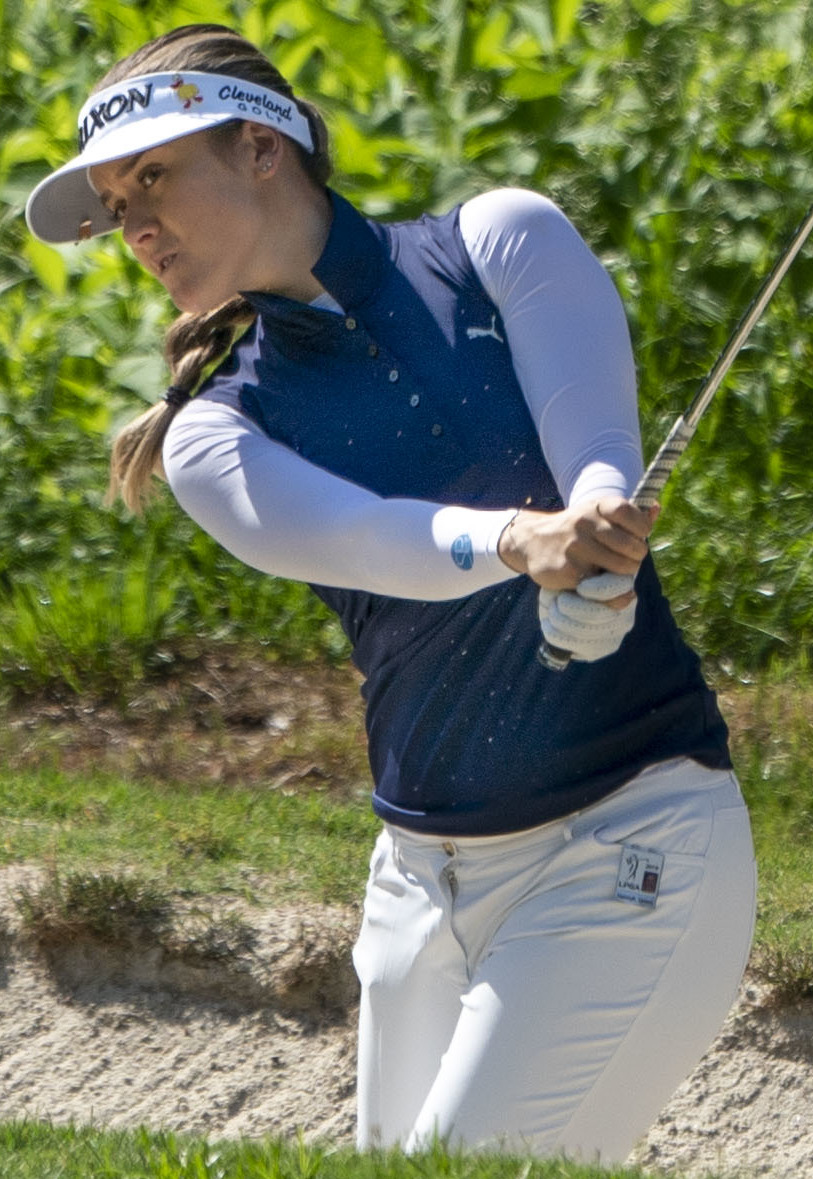
- Green in 2019

Personal information
- Nationality: Australia
- Born: 20 December 1996 (age 29) Perth, Western Australia
- Height: 5 ft 8 in (173 cm)
- Spouse: Jarryd Felton

Career
- Sport: Golf
- Turned professional: 2016
- Current tours: ALPG Tour; LPGA Tour
- Professional wins: 17

Number of wins by tour
- LPGA Tour: 8
- Ladies European Tour: 2
- WPGA Tour of Australasia: 6
- Epson Tour: 3

Best results in LPGA major championships (wins: 1)
- Chevron Championship: T7: 2026
- Women's PGA C'ship: Won: 2019
- U.S. Women's Open: T12: 2025
- Women's British Open: T16: 2019
- Evian Championship: T30: 2019

Achievements and awards
- Symetra Tour Rookie of the Year: 2017
- Greg Norman Medal: 2019, 2024

Hannah Green (born 20 December 1996) is an Australian professional golfer who plays in LPGA Tour, Ladies European Tour and WPGA Tour of Australasia events. She has won seventeen professional titles, including eight on the LPGA Tour, with one major—the 2019 Women's PGA Championship.

Green was born in Perth, Western Australia, and won several amateur titles, including the Victorian Women's Amateur Championship. She turned professional in 2016 and the following year won three events on the Symetra Tour, earning herself an LPGA Tour Card. In 2019, Green's victory at the 2019 Women's PGA Championship was both her first major and first title on the LPGA Tour. Her win also made her the third Australian woman to achieve victory at one of the sport's major events. In 2025, Green helped Australia win the International Crown for the first time, and in 2026, she won three consecutive tournaments, including a first-ever victory on the Ladies European Tour.

== Life and career ==
=== 1996–2015: Early life and amateur career ===
Hannah Green was born on 20 December 1996 in Perth, Western Australia. Her father played golf, and she took up the sport aged nine after hitting with his clubs. She grew up playing golf at Mt Lawley Golf Club near her home city. Green later attended Como Secondary College and was in the golf academy at the school. She intentionally chose the college as she knew they would allow her to take time off to attend tournaments. In 2012, she was a member of the Australian team that defeated New Zealand 34.5–13.5 in the Trans Tasman Cup, an amateur team competition between the two nations. In 2014, she won the WA Amateur Championship, and the Dunes Medal. In 2015, Green helped Australia secure victory at the Astor Trophy, a tournament featuring teams from the Commonwealth. She also won the Karrie Webb scholarship, which gave her financial support for travel expenses as well as coaching from Karrie Webb. That year, she won the Victorian Women's Amateur Championship, and, while still playing as an amateur, finished second in the Handa New Zealand Women's Open Championship behind world number one Lydia Ko.

=== 2016–2021: Turning professional and first major triumph ===
Green turned professional in 2016, and recorded two pro-am wins that year: Pennant Hills Pro Am and the Hope Island Pro Am. The following year, she played on the Symetra Tour, winning three times, at the Sara Bay Classic, the Murphy USA El Dorado Shootout, and the IOA Golf Classic. After twelve top-10 finishes, she finished second on the money list and won the Rookie of the Year award. She earned her 2018 LPGA Tour card as a result. Green made her major championship debut at the 2018 ANA Inspiration, finishing in a tie for 16th place. During the 2018 LPGA Tour, she made the cut at 14 out of 24 events, recording one top-10 finish. That came at the ISPS Handa Women's Australian Open, where she finished third, four shots behind champion Ko Jin-young.

In February 2019, Green finished tied-10th at the Handa Women's Australian Open. In June, she won her first major (and first LPGA Tour event), the Women's PGA Championship, by one stroke over defending champion Park Sung-hyun. It was the first wire-to-wire win at the Women's PGA Championship since Yani Tseng in 2011 and the first major win by an Australian since Karrie Webb at the 2006 Kraft Nabisco Championship. At the start of the tournament, held at Hazeltine National Golf Club in Minnesota, Green was ranked 114th in the world. Her victory made her the third Australian woman to win a major, after Webb and Jan Stephenson. Her previous best major finish had been the tied for 16th she recorded at the 2018 ANA Inspiration.

On 1 September 2019, Green won her second LPGA Tour event at the Cambia Portland Classic. She had held a five-stroke advantage after the conclusion of the second round before trailing Yealimi Noh by one stroke at the end of the third. In the final round, a par on the 18th hole for Green coupled with a bogey for Noh gave Green the title. She finished tied-10th at the Toto Japan Classic, and in December, Green was awarded the Greg Norman Medal. In February 2020, she was jointly awarded the 2019 Western Australian Sports Star of the Year with Australian rules football player, Nat Fyfe. Over the course of the 2020 LPGA Tour, Green made the cut at thirteen of the fourteen events that she entered with one top-10 finish. That was achieved at the CME Group Tour Championship, where she finished in a tie for second, five strokes behind Ko Jin-young.

In April 2021, Green finished joint runner-up at the HSBC Women's World Championship, bogeying her final two holes to finish one shot behind South Korea's Hyo Joo Kim, before finishing tied-3rd at the Hugel-Air Premia LA Open. In June, she recorded a tied-3rd-place finish at the LPGA Mediheal Championship. In August 2021, Green represented Australia in the women's individual event at the 2020 Olympic Games in Tokyo. She scored 13-under-par in total and finished fifth overall. On the 2021 LPGA Tour, Green made the cut at 16 of the 18 tournaments that she entered and posted four top-10 finishes.

=== 2022–2026: International Crown triumph and further LPGA Tour victories ===
In February 2022, Green claimed a six-shot victory at the Women's Victorian Open, before winning the TPS Murray River tournament. Her triumph in the latter made her the first woman to win a 72-hole mixed gender event on a leading tour. In March, she finished tied-6th at the HSBC Women's World Championship, and in April, she finished in a tie for eighth at the Chevron Championship. Later that month, at the DIO Implant LA Open, Green finished in second position, five strokes behind Nasa Hataoka. In May, she led the Palos Verdes Championship by one stroke following the conclusion of the penultimate round, but eventually finished in a tie for fifth after making four bogeys during her final round. She also finished tied-5th at the Women's PGA Championship in June. In September, she finished tied-3rd at the AmazingCre Portland Classic, and in November, she posted a tied-4th finish at the Pelican Women's Championship. During the 2022 LPGA Tour season, Green made the cut at all 21 events that she entered and recorded nine top-10 finishes.

In May 2023, Green was victorious at the JM Eagle LA Championship after defeating Aditi Ashok and Lin Xiyu in a playoff. It was her third LPGA Tour title. Later that month, she represented Australia at the International Crown and helped them overcome Sweden 3–0 in the semi-finals, before losing to Thailand by the same scoreline in the final. In August, she finished tied-4th at the CPKC Women's Open, and in October, she finished seventh at the Walmart NW Arkansas Championship. On the 2023 LPGA Tour, Green made the cut at 16 of the 21 events in which she competed and recorded three top-10 finishes.

In March 2024, Green triumphed at the HSBC Women's World Championship to earn her fourth LPGA Tour title. She made a birdie on the final hole to clinch a one-stroke victory from Céline Boutier. The following month, she claimed another LPGA title, after securing a three-shot victory at the JM Eagle LA Championship to successfully defend the title she had won a year previously. Following her victory, she rose ten places in the world rankings to a career-high of eighth. In May, after finishing runner-up to Nelly Korda at the Mizuho Americas Open, she reached number five in the rankings. At the 2024 Summer Olympics, Green finished in a tie for fourth, one shot away from the bronze-medal position. It was the best ever finish by an Australian in an Olympic golf event. In October, she secured her third LPGA title of the year, with a one-stroke triumph over Boutier at the BMW Ladies Championship. Green made the cut at 16 of the 20 events that she entered on the 2024 LPGA Tour and posted six top-10 finishes. At the end of the year, she was awarded the Greg Norman Medal for a second time.

In February 2025, Green finished tied-4th at the LPGA Founders Cup, and the following month, she finished tied-7th at the HSBC Women's World Championship. A few weeks later, her defence of her JM Eagle LA Championship title ended with a tied-9th-placed finish. Green missed the cut at the Evian Championship in July, marking the first of five missed cuts in her next six tournaments. In October, Green finished tied-5th at the BMW Championship, before helping Australia win the International Crown for the first time. Australia defeated the United States in the final with Green overcoming Noh in the singles. The following month, at the Maybank Championship, Green reached a three-way playoff, but was ultimately defeated by Miyū Yamashita who won the title. During the 2025 LPGA Tour, Green posted five top-10 finishes and made the cut at 14 of the 20 events that she competed in.

In 2026, Green won the HSBC Women's World Championship for a second time after securing a one-stroke victory in Singapore. Her husband acted as her caddie after her regular caddie was unavailable. Two weeks later, she was victorious at the Women's Australian Open. She secured a one-stroke victory to earn her first Ladies European Tour title and become the first Australian to win the title since 2014. The following week, Green secured her third successive victory, by triumphing at the Australian WPGA Championship. With her husband again standing in as her caddie, she finished four strokes ahead of the field to become the first Australian female golfer to win three international events in succession.

At the 2026 JM Eagle LA Championship, Green won her fourth title of the year. She defeated Sei Young Kim and Im Jin-hee in a playoff after making a birdie on the first extra hole. It was her third victory at the tournament in the last four years.

== Personal life ==
Green married golfer Jarryd Felton in January 2024. Fellow golfer Su Oh was the matron of honour.

== Amateur wins ==
- 2012 Newman and Brooks Junior Championship
- 2013 WA 72 Hole Stroke Play
- 2014 Dunes Medal
- 2015 Port Phillip Open Amateur & Victorian Women's Amateur Championship

== Professional wins (17) ==
=== LPGA Tour wins (8) ===
Legend
Major championships (1)
Other LPGA Tour (7)

No.	Date	Tournament	Winning score	To par	Margin of victory	Runner-up	Winner's share ($)	Ref
1	23 Jun 2019	KPMG Women's PGA Championship	68-69-70-72=279	−9	1 stroke	(South Korea) Park Sung-hyun	577,500	
2	1 Sep 2019	Cambia Portland Classic	64-63-73-67=267	−21	1 stroke	(United States) Yealimi Noh	195,000	
3	30 Apr 2023	JM Eagle LA Championship	68-69-69-69=275	−9	Playoff	(India) Aditi Ashok (China) Lin Xiyu	450,000	
4	3 Mar 2024	HSBC Women's World Championship	74-67-67-67=275	–13	1 stroke	(France) Céline Boutier	270,000	
5	28 Apr 2024	JM Eagle LA Championship (2)	67-69-70-66=272	−12	3 strokes	(Sweden) Maja Stark	562,500	
6	20 Oct 2024	BMW Ladies Championship	64-64-70-71=269	–19	1 stroke	(France) Céline Boutier	330,000	
7	1 Mar 2026	HSBC Women's World Championship (2)	71-66-68-69=274	–14	1 stroke	(United States) Auston Kim	450,000	
8	19 Apr 2026	JM Eagle LA Championship (3)	67-69-67-68=271	–17	Playoff	(South Korea) Im Jin-hee (South Korea) Kim Sei-young	712,500	

LPGA Tour playoff record (2–1)

No.	Year	Tournament	Opponent(s)	Result	Ref
1	2023	JM Eagle LA Championship	(India) Aditi Ashok (China) Lin Xiyu	Won with par on second extra hole	
2	2025	Maybank Championship	(South Korea) Choi Hye-jin (Japan) Miyū Yamashita	Yamashita won with birdie on first extra hole	
3	2026	JM Eagle LA Championship (2)	(South Korea) Im Jin-hee (South Korea) Kim Sei-young	Won with birdie on first extra hole	

=== Ladies European Tour wins (2) ===
No.	Date	Tournament	Winning score	To par	Margin of victory	Runners-up	Winner's share	Ref
1	15 Mar 2026	Women's Australian Open^	70-69-68-70=277	−11	1 stroke	(France) Agathe Laisné (Australia) Cassie Porter	A$255,000	
2	22 Mar 2026	Australian WPGA Championship^	65-67-67-69=268	−16	4 strokes	(South Africa) Casandra Alexander (Germany) Alexandra Försterling	A$90,000	

^Co-sanctioned with the WPGA Tour of Australasia

=== Symetra Tour wins (3) ===
- 2017 Sara Bay Classic, Murphy USA El Dorado Shootout, IOA Golf Classic

=== ALPG Tour wins (6) ===
- 2017 Pennant Hills Pro Am, Hope Island Pro Am (tie with Rebecca Artis)
- 2022 Vic Open, TPS Murray River
- 2026 Women's Australian Open^, Australian WPGA Championship^

^Co-sanctioned with the Ladies European Tour

== Major championships ==
=== Wins (1) ===
Year	Championship	54 holes	Winning score	Margin	Runner(s)-up	Ref
2019	Women's PGA Championship	1 shot lead	−9 (68-69-70-72=279)	1 stroke	(South Korea) Park Sung-hyun	

=== Results timeline ===
Results not in chronological order.

Tournament	2018	2019	2020	2021	2022	2023	2024	2025	2026
Chevron Championship	T16	CUT	T62	T14	T8	CUT	CUT	CUT	T7
U.S. Women's Open		T34	T40	T62	T28	T13	T16	T12	T28
Women's PGA Championship	CUT	1	T23	CUT	T5	T68	T24	68	CUT
The Evian Championship	CUT	T30	NT		T31	CUT	T44	CUT	CUT
Women's British Open	T55	T16	T29	T48	T35	CUT	CUT	CUT	T29

Win
Top 10
Did not play

CUT = missed the half-way cut
NT = no tournament
T = tied

=== Summary ===
Tournament	Wins	2nd	3rd	Top-5	Top-10	Top-25	Events	Cuts made
Chevron Championship	0	0	0	0	2	4	9	5
U.S. Women's Open	0	0	0	0	0	3	8	8
Women's PGA Championship	1	0	0	2	2	4	9	6
The Evian Championship	0	0	0	0	0	0	7	3
Women's British Open	0	0	0	0	0	1	9	6
Totals	1	0	0	2	4	12	42	28

- Most consecutive cuts made – 10 (2019 U.S. Open – 2021 U.S. Open)
- Longest streak of top 10s – 1 (four times)

== LPGA Tour career summary ==
Year	Tournaments played	Cuts made *	Wins (Majors)	2nd	3rd	Top 10s	Best finish	Earnings ($)	Money list rank	Scoring average	Scoring rank
2016	1	1	0	0	0	0	T20	n/a	n/a	71.00	n/a
2017	1	1	0	0	0	1	T7	n/a	n/a	71.75	n/a
2018	24	14	0	0	1	1	3	244,474	73	72.36	105
2019	23	19	2	0	0	4	1	1,043,537	12	71.45	61
2020	14	13	0	1	0	1	T2	442,843	22	71.34	27
2021	18	16	0	1	2	4	2	580,227	36	70.45	24
2022	21	21	0	1	1	9	2	1,175,048	18	69.82	11
2023	21	16	1	0	0	3	1	1,027,812	24	70.61	29
2024	20	16	3	1	0	6	1	2,074,873	9	70.23	6
2025	20	14	0	1	0	5	T2	1,010,330	42	70.90	44
Totals^	161 (2018)	129 (2018)	6	5	4	33	1	7,599,144	51		

^ Official as of 2025 season
*Includes matchplay and other tournaments without a cut.

== World ranking ==
Position in Women's World Golf Rankings at the end of each calendar year.

Year	World ranking	Source
2015	344	
2016	408	
2017	200	
2018	143	
2019	22	
2020	18	
2021	26	
2022	19	
2023	28	
2024	6	
2025	17	

== Team appearances ==
Amateur

- Patsy Hankins Trophy (representing Asia/Pacific): 2016 (winners)
- Espirito Santo Trophy (representing Australia): 2016
- Astor Trophy (representing Australia): 2015 (winners)
- Tasman Cup (representing Australia): 2012 (winners)
- Queen Sirikit Cup (representing Australia): 2014, 2015, 2016

Professional

- The Queens (representing ALPG): 2017
- International Crown (representing Australia): 2023, 2025 (winners)

== Recognition ==
- 2019 – Australian Women's Health Sport Awards Outstanding Woman in Sport.
- 2020 - Western Australian Sports Star of the Year (joint with Nat Fyfe)
