= Tasman Cup =

Amateur team golf tournament

The Tasman Cup was an amateur women's team golf tournament, played between Australia and New Zealand from 1933 to 2016. From 2007 to 2012 it was played as part of the Trans Tasman Cup. In 2016 the trophy was contested using scores from the two qualifying rounds of the Australian Women's Amateur.

== History ==
The first contest was held at Victoria Golf Club in Melbourne in 1933. It was played on 1 September, after the qualifying rounds of the Australian Women's Amateur but before the start of the match-play stage. Four singles were played in the morning and two foursomes in the afternoon. Australia won 3 of the 4 singles matches but after lunch three of the five Australian players were unable to play in the foursomes because of illness, and they had to concede the second foursomes match. New Zealand won the foursomes match that was played and the match was tied at 3 matches each. The result was decided on holes won and, with the conceded match being scored as a 10&8 win, New Zealand won by 13 holes to 8. The second contest was held at Titirangi in 1934, Australia winning all six matches. It was not played in 1935 but returned in 1936 and was played annually until 1954, except for a long gap from 1939 to 1948 because of World War II. From 1936 the order of the matches was changed, with foursomes in the morning and singles in the afternoon. The 1936 the match was played in Adelaide the day after the final of the Australian Women's Amateur, which had involved two of the New Zealand team. However, Australia regained the cup, winning a close match at the final hole. New Zealand won the cup at Napier in 1937, taking three of the four singles matches, and retained it in Sydney in 1938, again winning three singles matches. In 1938 match was, as in 1933, played after the qualifying rounds of the Australian Women's Amateur.

The contest resumed at Invercargill in 1949 with Australia winning after taking both the foursomes matches. The 1950 match in Brisbane was played between the quarter and semi-finals of the Australian Women's Amateur with Betty Kernot as manager. The match was a tie with each team winning a foursomes and two singles. The result was decided, as in 1933, on holes ahead in those three matches, Australia winning by 11 holes to 9. At Auckland in 1951 New Zealand led after the foursomes but Australia won three of the four singles, to retain the cup. The 1952 match in Melbourne resulted in a tie. New Zealand won both foursomes but Australia won three of the four singles. Both teams were a total of 9 holes ahead in their three wins, so there was also a tie on countback, Australia retaining the cup as defending champions. There format was revised in 1953 with five singles matches being played instead of four. Australia retained the cup in 1953 and 1954 winning 5–2 and 6–1, winning all five singles matches in 1954.

In 1955 the New Zealand Ladies' Golf Union suggested that it became a biennial event and it was played on that basis from 1956. The 1956 match at Ngamotu resulted in a tie. Unlike previous ties, the result was not decided on holes won. As in 1952 Australia retaining the cup as defending champions. Australia won the 1958 match in Melbourne 7–0 and won again at Christchurch in 1960 by 5 matches to 1 with one match halved. The 1962 match in Adelaide was very close. With the score level at three matches each, the result was decided by the final match. Gail Corry won the last three holes against Pat Bull to win her match and give Australia the cup.

From 1964 the match was extended to two days. In 1964 matches were extended to 36 holes with two foursomes on the first day and five single on the second. the teams were level after the first day but Australia won three of the five singles matches to retain the cup. From 1966 matches were reduced to 18 holes with the number of matches increasing. Two sets of foursomes were played on the first with two set of singles on the second. There were two foursomes and four single matches in each set of matches. Australia led 3–1 after the foursomes but New Zealand tied the match after the morning singles. Australia won two of the afternoon singles and halved the other two, to win the match 7–5. At Wellington in 1968 New Zealand won for the first time since 1938. They led 3–1 after the first day foursomes and extended the lead after the morning singles. The afternoon singles session was tied, New Zealand winning the cup by a score of 7½–4½. Australia regained the cup at Pymble in 1970, by the same score. They led 6–2 after the second day morning singles and although New Zealand won the final session, Australia won by three points. The 1972 match at Christchurch produced a close finish. Australia led narrowly after the foursomes and with both singles session level they won by a single point, 7½–4½. In Adelaide in 1974, Australia had their biggest win at that time, winning 10–2. New Zealand halved two of the foursomes matches and won one of the eight singles. The next match was played the following year, 1975. New Zealand led after the first day but Australia again dominates the singles and won the match 8–4.

The format was changed in 1977 so that there were foursomes on both mornings and singles in the afternoon. Australian won 9½–2½. The next match was played at Rotorua in 1978. Australian led 5–1 after the first day but New Zealand won five of the six matches on the second day to tie the contest. The next match was played at Southport in 1981. Australia led 4½-1½ after the first day and won narrowly 6½-5½ after a New Zealand fightback. Australia won more convincingly 8½-3½ at Russley in 1983 and won a one-sided match 11-1 in Melbourne in 1985. The Junior Tasman Cup was first played in 1983. The 1987 contest in Wellington result in a tie. The teams were tied after the first day and still tied after the second. Australian won three of the afternoon four singles to tie the match. There was another close match at Lake Karrinyup in 1989, Australia winning 6½-5½.

From 1995 to 2003 the contest was extended, with three foursomes and six singles matches each day, returning to the earlier format in 2005. From 2007 to 2012 it was held as part of the Trans Tasman Cup, which also included men, boys and girls matches. It was played annually from 2007 to 2010 and finally in 2012. New Zealand won in 2007 and 2009, Australia winning in 2008, 2010 and 2012. A final event was held in 2016 using scores from the two qualifying rounds of the Australian Women's Amateur, New Zealand winning by four strokes.

== Results ==
Year	Venue	Winning team	Score		Losing team	Ref
1933	Victoria Golf Club	New Zealand	3 (13)	3 (8)	Australia	
1934	Titirangi Golf Club	Australia	6	0	New Zealand	
1936	Royal Adelaide Golf Club	Australia	3½	2½	New Zealand	
1937	Napier Golf Club	New Zealand	4	2	Australia	
1938	The Australian Golf Club	New Zealand	4	2	Australia	
1949	Invercargill Golf Club	Australia	4	2	New Zealand	
1950	Royal Queensland Golf Club	Australia	3 (11)	3 (9)	New Zealand	
1951	Auckland Golf Club	Australia	3½	2½	New Zealand	
1952	Kingston Heath Golf Club	Tied	3 (9)	3 (9)		
1953	Wanganui Golf Club	Australia	5	2	New Zealand	
1954	Brisbane Golf Club	Australia	6	1	New Zealand	
1956	New Plymouth Golf Club	Tied	3½	3½		
1958	Royal Melbourne Golf Club	Australia	7	0	New Zealand	
1960	Christchurch Golf Club	Australia	5½	1½	New Zealand	
1962	Glenelg Golf Club	Australia	4	3	New Zealand	
1964	Manawatu Golf Club	Australia	4	3	New Zealand	
1966	Kingston Heath Golf Club	Australia	7	5	New Zealand	
1968	Wellington Golf Club	New Zealand	7½	4½	Australia	
1970	Pymble Golf Club	Australia	7½	4½	New Zealand	
1972	Christchurch Golf Club	Australia	6½	5½	New Zealand	
1974	Kooyonga Golf Club	Australia	10	2	New Zealand	
1975	Auckland Golf Club	Australia	8	4	New Zealand	
1977	Royal Perth Golf Club	Australia	9½	2½	New Zealand	
1978	Rotorua Golf Club	Tied	6	6		
1981	Southport Golf Club	Australia	6½	5½	New Zealand	
1983	Russley Golf Club	Australia	8½	3½	New Zealand	
1985	Victoria Golf Club	Australia	11	1	New Zealand	
1987	Wellington Golf Club	Tied	6	6		
1989	Lake Karrinyup Golf Club	Australia	6½	5½	New Zealand	
1991	Mount Maunganui Golf Club	New Zealand	6½	5½	Australia	
1993	Brisbane Golf Club	Australia	9	3	New Zealand	
1995	Waitikiri Golf Club	New Zealand	10	8	Australia	
1997	Royal Hobart Golf Club	Australia	10½	7½	New Zealand	
1999	Russley Golf Club	Australia	10½	7½	New Zealand	
2001	Victoria Golf Club	Australia	14	4	New Zealand	
2003	Royal Adelaide Golf Club	Australia	16	2	New Zealand	
2005	Titirangi Golf Club	New Zealand	7	5	Australia	
2007	Royal Canberra Golf Club	New Zealand	6½	5½	Australia	
2008	Royal Wellington Golf Club	Australia	7	3	New Zealand	
2009	Royal Canberra Golf Club	New Zealand	7	5	Australia	
2010	Royal Wellington Golf Club	Australia	9½	2½	New Zealand	
2012	Peninsula Golf Club	Australia	10	2	New Zealand	
2016	Metropolitan Golf Club & Peninsula Kingswood CGC	New Zealand	458	462	Australia	

A number of matches were scored on the basis of two points for a win and one point each for a halved match. For consistency, with the exception of 2016, matches in the table above are scored as one point for a win and half a point each for a halved match.

== Teams ==
=== Australia ===
- 1933 Joan Hammond, Odette Lefebvre, Mona MacLeod, Jess Russell, Susie Tolhurst
- 1934 Leslie Bailey, Joan Hammond, Cecily Lascelles, Mona MacLeod, Nin Robinson
- 1936 Hilda Britten-Jones, Enid Clements, Nell Hutton, Mona MacLeod, Nancy Negus
- 1937 Nell Hutton, Betty Kernot, Susie Morpeth, Shirley Tolhurst, Burtta Cheney
- 1938 Enid Clements, Meg Evans, Janet Gardiner, Pat Hore, Betty Kernot
- 1949 Maxine Bishop, Pat Borthwick, Burtta Cheney, Joan Fletcher, Judith Percy
- 1950 Dot Boully, Norma George, Enid Hauritz, Helen Stockman, Janette Wellard
- 1951 Maxine Bishop, Pat Borthwick, Joan Fletcher, Judith Percy, Janette Wellard
- 1952 Maxine Bishop, Pat Borthwick, Joan Fletcher, Judith Percy, Janette Wellard
- 1954 Maxine Bishop, Dot Boully, Elizabeth Gibbings, Margaret Masters, Judith Percy
- 1956 Burtta Cheney, Joan Fletcher, Mardi Mair, Margaret Masters, Rhonda Watson
- 1958 Pat Borthwick, Joan Fletcher, Dorothy Gardiner, June Howe, Margaret Masters
- 1960 Pat Borthwick, Burtta Cheney, Eileen Dawson, Joan Fisher, Margaret Masters, Gloria Small
- 1962 Gail Corry, Joyce Greenwood, Beatrice Hayley, Margaret Masters, Judith Percy, Rhonda Watson
- 1964 Barbara Coulson, Dawn Dehnert, Joan Fletcher, Marea Hickey, Joanna McLachlan, Beatrice Turner
- 1966 Gail Corry, Barbara Coulson, Marea Hickey, Dianna Thomas, Rhonda Watson
- 1968 Betty Dalgleish, June Howe, Anne Kenny, Heather Kerr, Judy Perkins
- 1970 Robyn Dummett, Lindy Jennings, Judy Perkins, Jan Stephenson, Rhys Wright
- 1972 Carole Blair, Gayle Flynn, Helene Gosse, Vicki Jellis, Penny Pulz
- 1974 Anne Alletson, Lindy Goggin, Jane Lock, Sandy McGaw, Marea Parsons
- 1975 Anne Alletson, Gayle Flynn, Helene Gosse, Jill Miles, Karen Permezel
- 1977 Heather Bleeck, Julie Bretherton, Lindy Goggin, Edwina Kennedy, Jane Lock
- 1978 Heather Bleeck, Judy Byrne, Jane Crafter, Penny Edmunds, Keryn Henry
- 1981 Corinne Dibnah, Lindy Goggin, Dennise Hutton, Sandy McGaw, Sue Tonkin
- 1983 Corinne Dibnah, Helen Hopkins, Edwina Kennedy, Diane Pavich, Sue Tonkin
- 1985 Louise Briers, Lindy Goggin, Edwina Kennedy, Sandra McGaw, Ann Wilson
- 1987 Louise Briers, Edwina Kennedy, Mardi Lunn, Ericka Maxwell, Alison Munt
- 1989 Louise Briers, Liz Cavill, Edwina Kennedy, Helen Kight, Ericka Maxwell
- 1991 Tracie Hale, Rachel Hetherington, Anne-Marie Knight, Ericka Maxwell, Jane Shearwood
- 1993 Rachel Hetherington, Tanya Holl, Loraine Lambert, Joanne Mills, Karrie Webb
- 1995 Fiona Giles, Tanya Holl, Ann Johnston, Kate MacIntosh, Torie O'Connor, Allison Wheelhouse, Simone Williams
- 1997 Adele Bannerman, Tamie Durdin, Tammy Hall, Tanya Holl, Kate MacIntosh, Gloria Park, Simone Williams
- 1999 Helen Beatty, Cherie Byrnes, Tamara Johns, Michelle Lawrence-Bristow, Rebecca Stevenson, Nadina Taylor, Lindsey Wright
- 2001 Helen Beatty, Carlie Butler, Nikki Campbell, Rebecca Coakley, Katy Jarochowicz, Rebecca Stevenson, Nadina Taylor
- 2003 Misun Cho, Melanie Holmes-Smith, Katy Jarochowicz, Sarah Kemp, Sarah-Jane Kenyon, Dana Lacey
- 2005 Emma Bennett, Jody Fleming, Nikki Garret, Sarah Kemp, Bree Turnbull
- 2007 Julia Boland, Clare Choi, Stephanie Na, Kristie Smith
- 2008 Bree Arthur, Ashlee Dewhurst, Rebecca Flood, Stacey Keating
- 2009 Ebony Heard, Stacey Keating, Justine Lee, Jessica Speechley
- 2010 Adriana Brent, Ashlee Dewhurst, Breanna Elliott, Grace Lennon
- 2012 Stephanie Bunque, Hannah Green, Gennai Goodwin, Rebecca Kay

=== New Zealand ===
- 1933 Mrs H Dodgshun, Bessie Gaisford, Oliver Kay, Noeline Templer, Mrs Guy Williams
- 1934 Winnie Barns-Graham, Mrs H Dodgshun, Bessie Gaisford, Oliver Kay, Olive Stevens
- 1936 Valmai Fleming, Bessie Fullerton-Smith, Pat Helean, Jean Horwell, Oliver Kay
- 1937 Joyce Betts, Bessie Fullerton-Smith, Pat Helean, Oliver Hollis, Jean Horwell
- 1938 Valmai Fleming, Bessie Fullerton-Smith, Pat Helean, Jean Horwell, Phyllis Crombie
- 1949 Jean Jackson Ball, Rosemary Hodges, Zoe Hudson, Margaret Hughes, Mrs HA Murray
- 1950 Jean Jackson Ball, Rosemary Hodges, Zoe Hudson, Margaret Hughes, Mrs HA Murray
- 1951 Rosemary Hodges, Zoe Hudson, Margaret Hughes, Mrs HA Murray, Mrs P Glanville
- 1952 Doreen Blundell, Zoe Hudson, Margaret Hughes, Rosemary McCoy, Mrs J Dolan
- 1953 Doreen Blundell, Zoe Hudson, Margaret Hughes, Aileen Nash, Mrs J Dolan
- 1954 Doreen Blundell, Cath Collier, Aileen Nash, Mrs HC MacDiarmid, Margaret Purdon
- 1956 Cath Collier, Doreen Juno, Aileen Nash, Mrs D Steel, Una Wickham
- 1958 Pam Bull, Nicki Campbell, Susan Grigg, Ruth Middleton, Una Wickham
- 1960 Nicki Campbell, Sheryl Chapman, Susan Grigg, Mrs HC MacDiarmid, Merryn Stubbs, Una Wickham
- 1962 Pam Bull, Susan Grigg, Pat Harrison, Jean Mangan, Una Wickham
- 1964 Jane Butler, Susan Grigg, Pat Harrison, Jean Mangan, Sally Turvey
- 1966 Heather Booth, Pat Bull, Jane Little, Glennis Taylor, Natalie White
- 1968 Cushla Sullivan, Glennis Taylor, Una Wlckham, Natalie White, Jean Whitehead
- 1970 Heather Booth, Judith Hanratty, Cushla Sullivan, Glennis Taylor, Una Wlckham
- 1972 Gillian Bannan, Pip Dudding, Sue Hamilton, Marilyn Smith, Cushla Sullivan
- 1974 Gillian Bannan, Sue Bishop, Sue Boag, Frances Pere, S Ritchie
- 1975 Gillian Bannan, Sue Bishop, Sue Boag, Liz Douglas, Frances Pere
- 1977 Liz Douglas, Cherry Kingham, Kaye Maxwell, Brenda Ormsby, Heather Ryan
- 1978 Jan Arnold, Liz Douglas, Cherry Kingham, Brenda Ormsby, Heather Ryan
- 1981 Jan Arnold, Liz Douglas, Cherry Kingham, Brenda Rhodes, Jan Scandrett
- 1983 Jan Arnold, Liz Douglas, D Randell, Brenda Rhodes, Jan Scandrett
- 1985 Jan Cooke, Liz Douglas, Karrin Duckworth, Jan Scandrett, Debbie Smith
- 1987 Jan Cooke, Liz Douglas, Tracey Hanson, Debbie Smith, Annette Stott
- 1989 Liz Douglas, Tracey Hanson, Sheree Higgens, Jan Higgins, Ingrid van Steenbergen
- 1991 Lisa Aldridge, Lynnette Brooky, Susan Farron, Kerryn Starr, Annette Stott
- 1993 Lisa Aldridge, Lynnette Brooky, Susan Farron, Gina Scott, Kerrin Starr
- 1995 Joanna Croskery, Shelley Duncan, Renee Fowler, Catherine Knight, Gina Scott, Pam Sowden, Kerryn Starr
- 1997 Joanna Croskery, Shelley Duncan, Renee Fowler, Tina Howard, Catherine Knight, Brenda Ormsby, Gina Scott
- 1999 Lisa Aldridge, Anita Boon, Hee-jeong Chun, Robyn Cruse, Claire Dury, Wendy Hawkes, Catherine Knight
- 2001 Anita Boon, Hee-jeong Chun, Claire Dury, Wendy Hawkes, Tina Howard, Brenda Ormsby, Debbie Smith
- 2003 Enu Chung, Olivia Hartley, Tina Howard, Penny Newbrook, Sarah Nicholson, Naomi Wallace, Kyla Welsh
- 2005 Sharon Ahn, Natasha Krishna, Penny Newbrook, Sarah Nicholson, Jenny Park
- 2007 Sharon Ahn, Yeon-song Kim, Dasom Lee, Penny Smith
- 2008 Caroline Bon, Larissa Eruera, Dana Kim, Penny Smith
- 2009 Caroline Bon, Zoe Brake, Larissa Eruera, Emily Perry
- 2010 Caroline Bon, Zoe Brake, Emily Perry, Lisa Wright
- 2012 Julienne Alvarez, Sarah Bradley, Chantelle Cassidy, Emily Perry
- 2016 Chantelle Cassidy, Munchin Keh, Alanna Campbell, Momoka Koburi

== See also ==
- Sloan Morpeth Trophy
- Trans Tasman Cup
