= Tim Ackert =

American politician (born 1963)

Member of the Connecticut House of Representatives from the 8th district
- Incumbent
- Assumed office 2011
- Preceded by: Joan Lewis
- Succeeded by: Francis Lombard (elect)

Personal details
- Born: April 13, 1963 (age 63) Middletown, Connecticut, U.S.
- Party: Republican
- Education: Manchester Community College

Military service
- Allegiance: United States
- Branch/service: United States Air Force

Timothy J. Ackert (born April 13, 1963) is an American Republican from Connecticut. Since 2011, he has been a member of the Connecticut House of Representatives for the 8th district.
