= Lindy Goggin =

Tasmanian golfer (born 1949)

Lindsey Gaye "Lindy" Jennings Goggin (born 1949) is an amateur golfer and racehorse owner from Australia. Goggin is one of the country's most successful women golfers, having won the Tasmanian Amateur 19 times, a three-time winner of the Australian Women's Amateur, and four-time winner of the Victorian Women's Amateur Championship. In 1977, Goggin won the first Australian Women's PGA title.

== Biography ==
Lindsey Jennings was born in Launceston, Tasmania in 1949. Jennings began golfing at age 10. By 1976 Goggin was recorded as the lowest handicapped female golfer in the world. As an amateur, she was named the Tasmanian Champion a total of 19 times. Goggin won the 1974 Tasmanian amateur trophy seven days after the birth of her son Mathew. In 1971, 1977 and 1980, Goggin won the Australian Ladies Championship as well as with four Victorian Amateur Championships.

In 1977 she won the inaugural Australian Women's PGA. She would be named to captain team Australia five times. In 1978 she was on the Australian team that won the Espirito World Championship.

=== Racing ===
Goggin later left golf to become a thoroughbred racehorse trainer and owner with her husband Charlie Goggin. Goggin would manage the Runnymede Stud Syndicate. During the 2007 to 2008 seasons, Runnymeade Stud was named the top earning owner in Tasmania. In 2009, Conquering, a horse managed by Goggin's racing interest, was named the Tasmanian horse of the year.

Goggin returned to golf as a senior player, appearing in the top five of the 2023 Tasmanian senior amateur.

=== Recognition and legacy ===
On 26 January 1979, was made Member of the Order of Australia "For service to the sport of golf".

In 1993, Goggin was made a Member of the Order of Australia for her contributions to amateur golf.

Goggin was awarded the Australian Sports Medal on 2 November 2000 for her achievements as Australian captain, a member of a victorious World Cup team, a three-time Australian champion and a 19-time Tasmanian champion.

Goggin's son, Mathew Goggin also became a professional golfer. She would later caddie for her granddaughter Hallie Meaburn during her amateur golf tournaments.

== Amateur wins ==
this list may be incomplete

- 1971 Australian Women's Amateur, Tasmanian Amateur
- 1972 Tasmanian Amateur
- 1973 Victorian Women's Amateur Championship
- 1974 Tasmanian Amateur
- 1975 Tasmanian Amateur
- 1976 Victorian Women's Amateur Championship, Tasmanian Amateur
- 1977 Australian Women's Amateur, Tasmanian Amateur
- 1979 Tasmanian Amateur
- 1980 Australian Women's Amateur, Victorian Women's Amateur Championship, Tasmanian Amateur
- 1981 Queen Sirikit Cup (individual), Tasmanian Amateur
- 1982 Tasmanian Amateur
- 1983 Tasmanian Amateur
- 1984 Tasmanian Amateur
- 1986 Victorian Women's Amateur Championship
- 1987 Tasmanian Amateur
- 1988 Tasmanian Amateur
- 1990 Tasmanian Amateur
- 1991 Tasmanian Amateur

== Professional wins (1) ==
=== Ladies Professional Golf Association of Australia wins (1) ===
No.	Date	Tournament	Winning score	Margin of victory	Runner-up	Ref
1	1977	Australian Women's PGA Championship (as an amateur)		5 strokes		

== Australian national team appearances ==
- Astor Trophy: 1971, 1983 (winners), 1987
- Women's International Series: 1973 (winners)
- Tasman Cup: 1974 (winners), 1977 (winners), 1981 (winners), 1985 (winners)
- Espirito Santo Trophy: 1978 (winners), 1980
- Queen Sirikit Cup: 1981 (winners), 1982 (winners)
