= Edmund Britten Jones =

Australian rules footballer and cricketer (1888 - 1953)

Sir Edmund Britten Jones FRCP
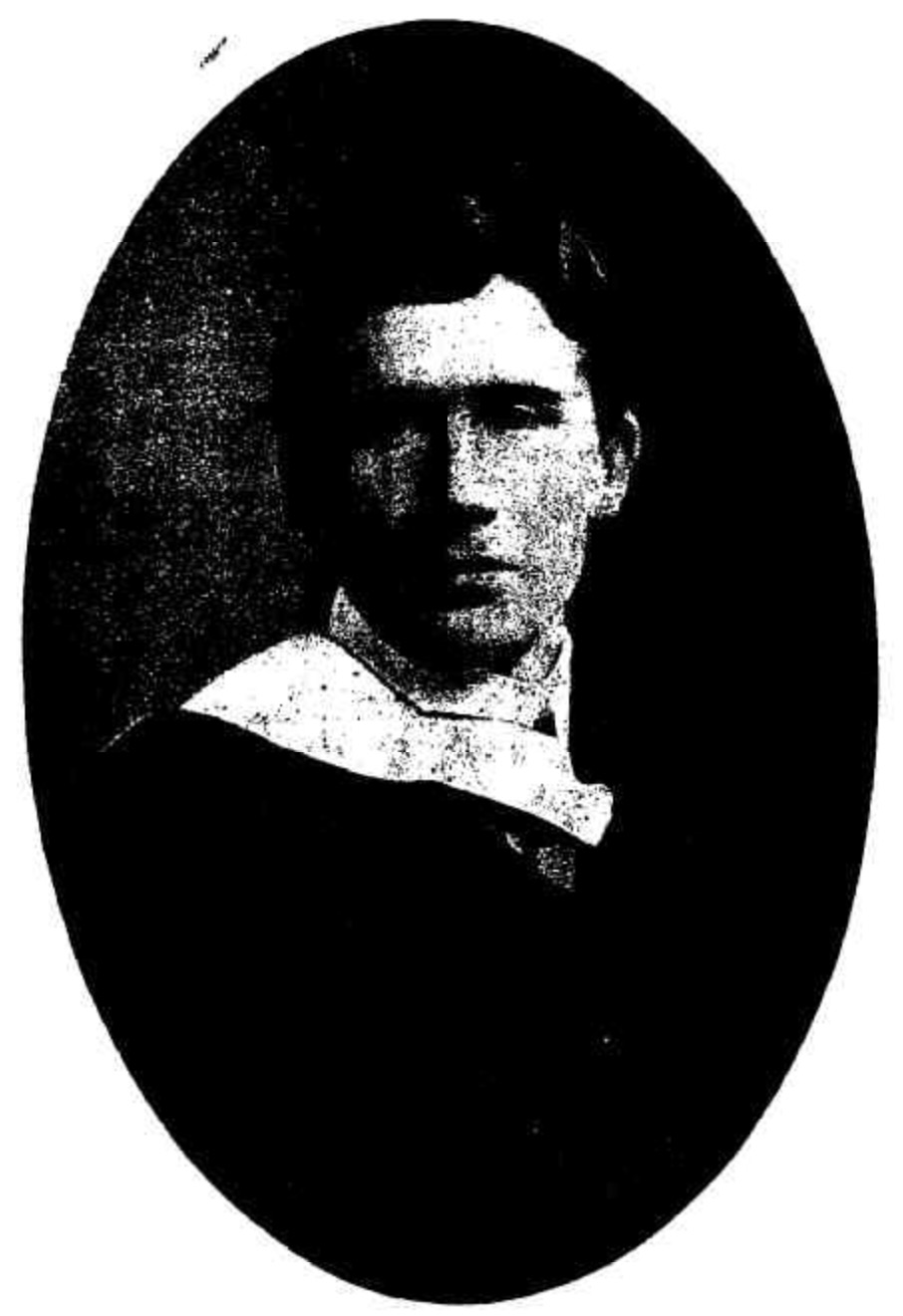
- Born: 8 October 1888; Adelaide, South Australia
- Died: 30 September 1953 (aged 64); Adelaide, South Australia
- Education: Christian Brothers College, Adelaide; Xavier College
- Alma mater: University of Adelaide; University of Oxford
- Occupation: Physician
- Years active: 1912-1953
- Spouse: Lady Hilda Madeline Britten-Jones
- Military career
- Allegiance: Australia
- Branch: Royal Australian Army Medical Corps
- Service years: 1914-1920; 1940-1941
- Rank: Lieutenant colonel
- Service number: SX1479
- Cricket career

Cricket information

Domestic team information
- Years: Team
- 1916-1918: Europeans (India)

Career statistics
Competition	First-class
Matches	2
Runs scored	105
Batting average	26.25
100s/50s	0/0
Top score	34
Balls bowled	354
Wickets	8
Bowling average	16.12
5 wickets in innings	1
10 wickets in match	0
Best bowling	5/16
Catches/stumpings	2/–
- Source: ESPNcricinfo, 18 December 2016
Australian rules football career
Playing career
Years	Club	Games (Goals)
1907-1910	North Adelaide	43 (2)

Sir Edmund Britten Jones (8 October 1888 – 30 September 1953) was an Australian rules footballer and cricketer. Born in Adelaide, he was educated at Christian Brothers' College, Xavier College and the University of Adelaide before being awarded a Rhodes Scholarship at the University of Oxford in 1912.

One of Adelaide's leading physicians, Jones received his knighthood in the New Year honours list in 1953, only months before his death.

Jones held many important posts in the medical, world. He was a Fellow of the Royal College of Physicians and of the Royal Australian College of Physicians, and a leading member of the British Medical Association. He was medical secretary of the SA branch from 1927 to 1929, president in 1934/5 and SA representative on the Federal Council in 1937.

He was a councillor of the Royal Australian College of Physicians in 1944. During a distinguished career Jones was president of the Medical Benevolent Association in 1949, and president of the Medical Board of SA in 1950.

Among his activities was his work with the University of Adelaide. He served as a member of the University Council from 1944 to 1946 and was acting lecturer on medical diseases of children. Jones, who took a life-long interest in children's ailments, was honorary consulting physician to the Adelaide Children's Hospital and the Queen Victoria Maternity Hospital.

Jones was survived by his widow, one son (Dr. R. Britten Jones) and two daughters (Mrs. Alan Cherry and Mrs. T. A. McBride).

== War Record ==
He had a distinguished record in both world wars, serving from 1914 to 1920 in World War I. Jones served in the Middle East in 1940–41 in World War II, in which he rose to the rank of Lt-Col. in the Australian Army Medical Corps.

== Sport ==
He was a first grade cricketer and footballer in his youth. He received a Blue from the University of Adelaide for Cricket in 1911 and represented North Adelaide Football Club. In later years his main sporting interest was golf.
