= Charlotte Thomas (golfer) =

English professional golfer (born 1993)

Personal information
- Nationality: England
- Born: 24 February 1993 (age 33) Surrey, England
- Height: 5 ft 6 in (1.68 m)

Career
- Sport: Golf
- College: University of Washington
- Turned professional: 2016
- Former tours: Symetra Tour (joined 2017); LPGA Tour (joined 2019)

Best results in LPGA major championships
- Chevron Championship: T67: 2020
- Women's PGA C'ship: 75: 2023
- U.S. Women's Open: 74: 2023
- Women's British Open: T64: 2019
- Evian Championship: CUT: 2019, 2022

Charlotte Thomas (born 24 February 1993) is an English professional golfer. She played on the Symetra Tour and the LPGA Tour. She won the 2016 NCAA Championship and was runner-up at the 2019 ISPS Handa Vic Open.

== Amateur career ==
Thomas was born in Surrey, England, and first golfed at Broadwater Park in Guildford, England. She lived in Singapore for five years and was educated at United World College of South East Asia, before attending the University of Washington from 2012 to 2016. She helped the Washington Huskies women's golf team win its first NCAA Division I women's golf championship in 2016, and concluded her UW career as the all-time leader in career top-10 finishes (25) and rounds played (147).

Thomas won the inaugural Annika Invitational at Mission Hills in Shenzhen, China in 2011. She also won the 2011 Victorian Women's Amateur Championship, and lost a playoff at the 2013 English Women's Open Amateur Stroke Play Championship to Amy Boulden. She represented England in two European Ladies' Team Championships, and Great Britain and Ireland four times at two Curtis Cups, a Vagliano Trophy and an Astor Trophy.

== Professional career ==
Thomas turned professional in 2016 and joined the 2017 Symetra Tour. In 2018, she recorded six top-10 finishes including a second place at the Sioux Falls GreatLIFE Challenge, a stroke behind Linnea Ström. She finished eighth in the rankings to earn membership for the 2019 LPGA Tour season. In her debut event as a member of the LPGA Tour, she was runner-up at the ISPS Handa Vic Open, two strokes behind Céline Boutier.

== Amateur wins ==
- 2011 Victorian Women's Amateur Championship, Annika Invitational at Mission Hills
- 2012 Northern Territory Amateur, Oregon State Invitational
- 2013 Topy Cup

== Results in LPGA majors ==
Results not in chronological order.

Tournament	2019	2020	2021	2022	2023
Chevron Championship	CUT	CUT			T67
U.S. Women's Open	CUT				74
Women's PGA Championship	CUT			CUT	75
The Evian Championship	CUT	NT		CUT	
Women's British Open	T64	CUT			

Did not play

CUT = missed the half-way cut
NT = no tournament
T = tied

== Team appearances ==
Amateur

- European Ladies' Team Championship (representing England): 2014, 2015
- Curtis Cup (representing Great Britain & Ireland): 2014, 2016 (winners)
- Vagliano Trophy: (representing Great Britain & Ireland): 2015
- Astor Trophy (representing Great Britain and Ireland): 2015
