= Evelyn MacKenzie =

Australian amateur golfer (1868–1949)

Personal information
- Full name: Evelyn Beatrice MacKenzie
- Nationality: Australia
- Born: 29 February 1868 Melbourne, Australia
- Died: 22 December 1949 (aged 81) England

Career
- Sport: Golf
- Status: Amateur

Evelyn Beatrice MacKenzie (born Eveline, 29 February 1868 – 22 December 1949) was an Australian amateur golfer. She was the first winner of the Ladies' Championship of Australia in 1894, and won it again in 1895, 1896 and 1898.

== Golf career ==
In 1894 the ladies of the Geelong and Melbourne clubs started an annual "Ladies Championship", to be played alternately on the two courses, the first event to be held at Geelong. It was initially decided by a bogey competition over two rounds. MacKenzie finished 9 down on bogey, two holes better than Jean Davie. McKenzie won again in 1895 at Royal Melbourne, this time a score of 1 up, five holes better than Josephine Yencken. She won for a third time at Geelong in 1896, finishing 6 down but 12 holes better than anyone else. McKenzie did not complete in 1897. The format was changed to match-play in 1898 and was won by McKenzie who beat Ethel Guthrie 3 and 1 in the 18-hole final.

== Personal life ==
MacKenzie was born on 29 February 1868 the daughter of John Mackenzie and Emily Cordelia née Lingham. She later moved to England where she died, unmarried, on 22 December 1949.

== See also ==
- Women's Museum of Australia
- Cup won by Miss Evelyn Beatrice Mackenzie, winner of Ladies Golf Championships of Australia
