= Margie Masters =

Australian professional golfer (1934–2022)

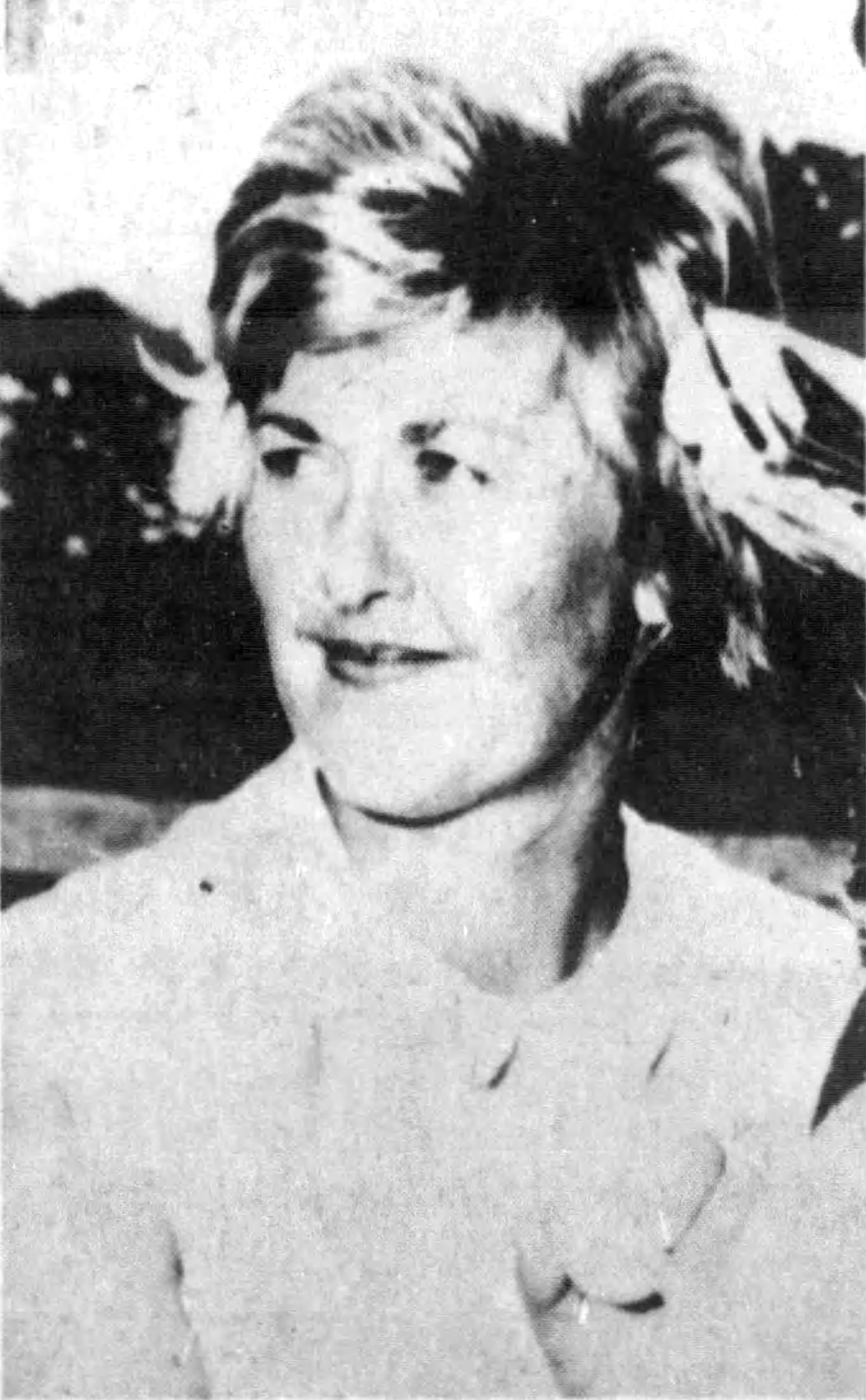
- Masters in 1967

Personal information
- Full name: Margaret Ann Masters
- Nationality: Australia
- Born: 24 October 1934 Swan Hill, Victoria, Australia
- Died: 9 October 2022 (aged 87) Tucson, Arizona, US
- Height: 5 ft 6 in (1.68 m)

Career
- Sport: Golf
- Turned professional: 1965
- Former tour: LPGA Tour
- Professional wins: 2

Number of wins by tour
- LPGA Tour: 1
- Other: 1

Best results in LPGA major championships
- Western Open: T2: 1966
- Titleholders C'ship: T21: 1972
- Women's PGA C'ship: T11: 1965
- U.S. Women's Open: 7th: 1967

Achievements and awards
- LPGA Tour Rookie of the Year: 1965

Margaret Ann Masters (24 October 1934 – 9 October 2022) was an Australian professional golfer. She won one title on the LPGA Tour in 1967, having been named Rookie of the Year two years earlier.

== Early life ==
Masters was born in Swan Hill, Victoria, on 24 October 1934. Her family later relocated to the Mornington Peninsula, where she started playing golf at the age of thirteen under her parents' influence. She attended Frankston High School outside Melbourne, where she set records in swimming. Masters won the inaugural Australian Girls' Amateur in 1953 and the Victorian Junior Championship four years in a row from 1951 to 1954. At senior level she won the New Zealand Women's Amateur in 1956, the South African Women's Amateur the following year, and the 1958 Australian Women's Amateur. She also won the Victorian Amateur five times between 1957 and 1963. After winning the Canadian Women's Amateur in 1964, she moved to the United States. In international competition she represented Australia in the Tasman Cup five successive times from 1954 to 1962 and played in the first two Commonwealth Trophy contests in 1959 and 1963.

== Professional career ==
Masters turned professional in 1965, becoming the first Australian to join the LPGA Tour, and was conferred the tour's Rookie of the Year Award. She finished runner-up at the Women's Western Open the following year, a major championship. Masters won her first and only LPGA title in 1967 at the Quality Chek'd Classic. She also won the Yankee Ladies' Team Championship with Clifford Ann Creed that same year, and finished second at the Supertest Ladies Open, losing to Carol Mann by two strokes. She lost a playoff by a single stroke to Shirley Englehorn at the 1970 O'Sullivan Ladies Open, before losing again by one stroke to Judy Kimball at the same tournament the following year. Masters had another runner-up finish at the Colgate Far East Open in December 1974. She retired from the tour five years later.

While playing at a tournament in Florida, Masters escaped uninjured when a sniper fired several shots at her and Marilynn Smith, one of the founders of the LPGA. Although the incident left her agitated, she continued playing and ultimately made the cut. The perpetrator was never identified.

Outside of golf, Masters was noted for successfully applying for a green card under the category of individuals with "exceptional ability in sciences or arts who would substantially benefit prospectively the national economy, cultural interest or welfare of the United States". Her petition resulted in the decision in January 1969 – the Matter of Masters – that regarded her as an entertainer in the arts, paving the way for other professional athletes to settle in the US via the same route.

== Later life ==
After retiring from competitive golf, Masters became a teacher. She resided in Tucson, Arizona, during her later years. Masters was inducted into Victoria's Golf Industry Hall of Fame in 2013. She was also honoured in the halls of fame at Woodlands, the Ottawa Hunt and Golf Club, as well as the Ottawa Valley Golf Association. The Woodlands championship trophy bears her name.

Masters died on 9 October 2022 in Tucson. She was 87 years old.

== Amateur wins ==
- 1951 Victorian Junior Championship
- 1952 Victorian Junior Championship
- 1953 Victorian Junior Championship, Australian Girls' Amateur
- 1954 Victorian Junior Championship
- 1956 New Zealand Women's Amateur Stroke Play Championship, New Zealand Women's Amateur
- 1957 South African Women's Amateur, Victorian Women's Amateur Championship
- 1958 Australian Women's Amateur
- 1959 Victorian Women's Amateur Championship
- 1960 New Zealand Women's Amateur Stroke Play Championship
- 1961 Victorian Women's Amateur Championship
- 1962 Victorian Women's Amateur Championship
- 1963 Victorian Women's Amateur Championship
- 1964 Canadian Women's Amateur

== Professional wins ==
=== LPGA Tour wins (1) ===
No.	Date	Tournament	Winning score	Margin of victory	Runners-up	Ref
1	13 Nov 1967	Quality Chek'd Classic	−2 (70-71-73=214)	1 stroke	(United States) Carol Mann (United States) Kathy Whitworth (United States) Mickey Wright	

LPGA Tour playoff record (0–1)

No.	Year	Tournament	Opponent	Result	Ref
1	1970	O'Sullivan Ladies Open	(United States) Shirley Englehorn	Lost to birdie on first extra hole	

=== Other wins ===
- 1967 Yankee Ladies' Team Championship (with Clifford Ann Creed)

== Team appearances ==
Amateur

- Commonwealth Trophy (representing Australia): 1959, 1963
- Tasman Cup (representing Australia): 1954 (winners), 1956 (tied), 1958 (winners), 1960 (winners), 1962 (winners)
