= Anna Rawson =

Australian model and golfer (born 1981)

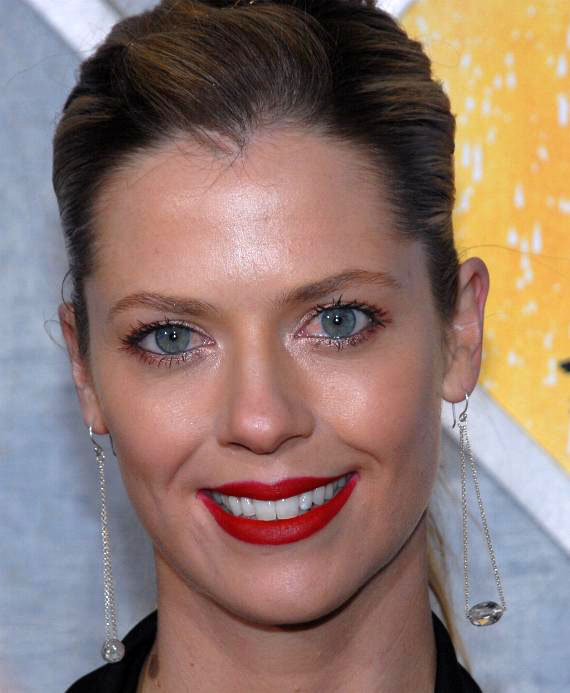
- Rawson at the premiere of Step Up 2 The Streets

Personal information
- Nationality: Australia
- Born: 5 August 1981 (age 45) Adelaide, Australia
- Height: 5 ft 10 in (1.78 m)

Career
- Sport: Golf
- College: Immanuel College; University of Southern California; Columbia Business School
- Turned professional: 2004
- Former tours: Futures Tour (2005); Ladies European Tour (2006–2007); LPGA Tour (2008–2010)

Best results in LPGA major championships
- Chevron Championship: DNP
- Women's PGA C'ship: CUT: 2008, 2009
- U.S. Women's Open: T55: 2010
- Women's British Open: CUT: 2009

Anna Rawson (born 5 August 1981) is an Australian model and former professional golfer. She played on the Ladies European Tour and the LPGA Tour.

== Early life ==
In 1981, Rawson was born in Adelaide, Australia. She got her break into a modeling career at age 16, when she was a finalist in the Australian "Dolly" Magazine cover contest. This opened up modeling opportunities on the catwalk, in print ads, magazines, and on television.

== Amateur career ==
In 1999 as an amateur golfer in Australia, Rawson was the South Australian and Victoria Junior Champion plus the winner of the Jack Newton International Junior Classic. She was the leading qualifier for the 1999 and 2000 Australian Women's Amateur and was a member of the 1999 Australian National Squad.

She played collegiate golf at the University of Southern California. She was named All-Pac-10 honorable mention in 2001, 2002 and 2004.

She also went to Immanuel College in Novar Gardens, South Australia and has a Master of Business Administration degree from Columbia Business School which she obtained in May 2015.

== Professional career ==
In 2004, Rawson turned professional. She played a full season on the Future Tour and missed the cut at the 2004 LPGA Final Qualifying Tournament. She finished third at the Ladies European Tour 2005 qualifying tournament and was a season 2006 LET rookie.

On 5 December 2007, Rawson notified fans via her Myspace page that she had been invited to join the LPGA Tour. In 2008, she qualified for a full-time tour card via Q school for the 2009 tour.

In 2009, Rawson appeared in a commercial for the domain site Go Daddy.com as one of the "GoDaddy Girls".

== Results in LPGA majors ==
Tournament	2008	2009	2010
Kraft Nabisco Championship			
LPGA Championship	CUT	CUT	WD
U.S. Women's Open			T55
Women's British Open		CUT	

Did not play

CUT = missed the half-way cut
WD = withdrew
"T" = tied

== LPGA Tour career summary ==
Year	Events played	Cuts made	Wins	2nds	3rds	Top 10s	Best finish	Earnings ($)	Rank	Scoring average	Scoring rank
2008	13	4	0	0	0	1	T10	62,798	127	73.54	121
2009	18	8	0	0	0	0	T13	86,103	95	73.00	94
2010	15	2	0	0	0	0	T41	18,010	134	74.82	128

- Official as of 31 January 2011
