= Nellie Gatehouse =

Australian amateur golfer (1886–1972)

Personal information
- Full name: Eleanor Wright Gatehouse
- Nationality: Australia
- Born: 12 May 1886 Brighton, Victoria, Australia
- Died: 30 August 1972 (aged 86) Australia

Career
- Sport: Golf
- Status: Amateur

Eleanor Wright Gatehouse (née Austin, 12 May 1886 – 30 August 1972) was an Australian amateur golfer. She won the Australian Women's Amateur in 1909, 1925 and 1928 and won the Victorian Women's Amateur Championship five times between 1907 and 1927.

== Golf career ==
Gatehouse finished third in the 1907 Australian Women's Amateur at Royal Melbourne, and the following week won the Victorian Women's Amateur Championship at Victoria Golf Club. In 1908 she was runner-up to Euphie Bell in the Victorian championship.

Gatehouse won both the Australian and Victorian championship in 1909. In the Australian event at Royal Melbourne she won by 11 strokes from Nancy Parbury and she also finished ahead of Parbury in the Victorian championship. In 1910 she led the qualifying in the Australian Women's Amateur at Royal Adelaide, but was beaten 5 and 4 by Nancy Parbury in the first match-play round. Parbury went on the win the championship. The following month Gatehouse retained the Victorian title, finishing 25 strokes ahead of the runner-up.

After 1910 Gatehouse played little top-level golf for a number of years, following the birth of her son in 1911. She made a return in 1920, finishing runner-up in both the Australian and Victorian championships.

Gatehouse had further successes between 1923 and 1928. In 1923 she was runner-up in the Australian championship but won the Victorian championship for the fourth time. In 1925 at The Australian Golf Club, she won her second Australian Women's Amateur, eight strokes ahead of Mona MacLeod, and she won again in 1928 when it became a match-play event, beating MacLeod in the final at Royal Sydney, 9 and 8. She was also runner-up in the Victorian championship in 1924 and 1926 and a winner for the fifth time in 1927.

Gatehouse was president of the Victorian Ladies' Golf Union from 1928 to 1936 and from 1942 to 1946.

== Personal life ==
Gatehouse was born on 12 May 1886 in Brighton, Victoria, the daughter of Harold Arthur Austin and Elizabeth Strother née Wright. She married James Gatehouse on 6 February 1907. They were divorced in 1927. She died on 30 August 1972.
