= Eileen Hope Williams =

New Zealand golfer and community leader

Eileen Hope Williams (1884–1958) was a notable New Zealand golfer and community leader. She was born in Rotorua, New Zealand in 1884. She won the Australian Women's Amateur in 1920.
