= Fiona Xu =

New Zealand professional golfer (born 2004)

Personal information
- Nationality: New Zealand
- Born: 2004 (age 21–22) Auckland, New Zealand

Career
- Sport: Golf
- Turned professional: 2023
- Current tour: LPGA Tour (joined 2025)
- Former tour: Epson Tour (joined 2024)
- Professional wins: 2

Number of wins by tour
- Epson Tour: 2

Fiona Xu (born 2004) is a New Zealand professional golfer and LPGA Tour player. She graduated from the Epson Tour in 2024 after winning the Copper Rock Championship.

== Early life and amateur career ==
Xu was born in Auckland and educated at Epsom Girls' Grammar School. She had a successful amateur career and won the New Zealand U16 Championship and New Zealand Women's Amateur, before capturing the 2022 Australian Women's Amateur as the first New Zealander to win the championship since Lydia Ko in 2012.

She reached a high of 13th in the World Amateur Golf Ranking in 2023 after finishing second at the Queen Sirikit Cup, third in the Women's Amateur Asia-Pacific, and fourth individually at the 2023 Espirito Santo Trophy.

Xu made a number of successful finishes in professional events as an amateur, including 10th at the 2022 Women's Australian Open, and tied sixth at the 2023 Women's Victorian Open.

== Professional career ==
Xu turned professional in late 2023 and made her pro debut at the 2023 Women's China Open, where she finished fourth. She joined the 2024 Epson Tour after earning status at LPGA qualifying school, where she finished tied 48th. In her rookie season, she was runner-up at the IOA Championship and won the Copper Rock Championship, to finish eighth on the Race for the Card Points List and earn LPGA Tour membership for the 2025 season.

== Amateur wins ==
- 2019 AJGA Lake Las Vegas Junior, Cambridge Classic, North Island Stroke Play Championship, Grant Clements Memorial Tournament
- 2020 New Zealand Women's Amateur, New Zealand U16 Championship
- 2022 Australian Women's Amateur

== Professional wins (2) ==
=== Epson Tour wins (2) ===
No.	Date	Tournament	Winning score	To par	Margin of victory	Runner-up
1	18 May 2024	Copper Rock Championship	67-63-64=194	−22	7 strokes	(South Africa) Kaleigh Telfer
2	16 May 2026	Copper Rock Championship (2)	68-67-68=203	−13	3 strokes	(United States) Ashley Menne (United States) Annabelle Pancake-Webb (Canada) Maddie Szeryk-DiBello

== Team appearances ==
Amateur

- Queen Sirikit Cup (representing New Zealand): 2022, 2023
- Espirito Santo Trophy (representing New Zealand): 2022, 2023
- Patsy Hankins Trophy (representing Asia-Pacific): 2023
- Junior Golf World Cup (representing New Zealand): 2023
