= James Gatehouse =

Australian rules footballer

Personal information
- Full name: James Gatehouse
- Born: 27 March 1883; Melbourne, Victoria
- Died: 7 December 1949 (aged 66); Ferny Creek, Victoria
- Original team: Geelong College

Playing career^{1}
| Years | Club | Games (Goals) |
| 1900 | Geelong | 1 (0) |
- ^{1} Playing statistics correct to the end of 1900.

James Gatehouse (27 March 1883 – 7 December 1949) was an Australian rules footballer who played with Geelong in the Victorian Football League (VFL).

In 1900 he married Eleanor Wright Austin, who was commonly referred to as 'Nellie'. She was a successful golfer and golf administrator and won three Australian titles, five Victorian titles and ten Club Championships at Royal Melbourne Golf Club. Her first Australian title was won in 1909.

James Gatehouse's father was Mayor of Melbourne during the period 1874–1875.
