= Connecticut's 8th House of Representatives district =

American legislative district

Connecticut's 8th State House of Representatives district
Representative
Tim Ackert; R

Connecticut's 8th House of Representatives district elects one member of the Connecticut House of Representatives. It is currently represented by Tim Ackert. The district consists of the entire towns of Columbia and Coventry, as well as part of the town of Vernon. Prior to 2001, the district also contained part of Lebanon, but only part of Coventry.

== List of representatives ==
List of Representatives from Connecticut's 8th State House District
Representative	Party	Years	District home	Note
Lorenzo Morgan	Democratic	1967–1973	Hartford	Seat created
Howard M. Klebanoff	Democratic	1973–1977	Hartford	
A. Boyd Hinds Jr.	Democratic	1977–1981	Hartford	
Carrie Saxon Perry	Democratic	1981–1983	Hartford	
Edith Prague	Democratic	1983–1993	Columbia	
Patrick Flaherty	Democratic	1993–2003	Coventry	Did not run for reelection
Joan Lewis	Democratic	2003–2011	Coventry	Defeated
Tim Ackert	Republican	2011–	Coventry	Incumbent

== Recent elections ==
State Election 2008: House District 8
Party	Candidate	Votes	%	±%
Democratic	Joan Lewis	5,968	47.7	−8.9
Republican	Timothy J. Ackert	5,845	46.7	+6.8
Working Families	Joan Lewis	711	5.7	+3.2
Majority		834	6.7	−13.6
Turnout		12,524		
Democratic hold		Swing	-6.8	

State Election 2006: House District 8
Party	Candidate	Votes	%	±%
Democratic	Joan Lewis	5,477	56.6	−33.2
Republican	Timothy J. Ackert	3,858	39.9	+39.9
Working Families	Joan Lewis	342	3.5	−6.7
Majority		1,961	20.3	−49.3
Turnout		9,677		
Democratic hold		Swing	-39.9	

State Election 2004: House District 8
Party	Candidate	Votes	%	±%
Democratic	Joan Lewis	7,568	89.9	+35.1
Working Families	J. David Batchelder	858	10.2	+10.2
Majority		6,710	79.6	+70.1
Turnout		8,426		
Democratic hold		Swing	+24.9	

State Election 2002: House District 8
Party	Candidate	Votes	%	±%
Democratic	Joan Lewis	4,615	54.8	−8.5
Republican	Robert J. Kleinhans	3,814	45.2	+8.5
Majority		801	9.5	−17.1
Turnout		8,429		
Democratic hold		Swing	+8.5	

State Election 2000: House District 8
Party	Candidate	Votes	%	±%
Democratic	Patrick Flaherty	7,060	63.3	−5.8
Republican	Robert J. Kleinhans	4,093	36.7	+5.8
Majority		2,967	26.6	−11.6
Turnout		11,153		
Democratic hold		Swing	-5.8	

State Election 1998: House District 8
Party	Candidate	Votes	%	±%
Democratic	Patrick Flaherty	5,688	69.1	
Republican	Shelton John Stewart	2,545	30.9	
Majority		3,143	38.2	
Turnout		8,233		
Democratic hold		Swing		
