= Lady Hilda Madeline Britten-Jones =

Australian golfer (1892–1965)

Hilda Britten-Jones
Personal information
- Full name: Hilda Madeline Britten-Jones
- Nationality: Australia
- Born: 1892 South Australia
- Died: 1965 (aged 72–73) Adelaide, South Australia
- Spouse: Edmund Britten Jones

Career
- Sport: Golf
- Status: Amateur

Lady Hilda Madeline Britten-Jones (née Fisher) (1892–1965) was born in South Australia. She was the South Australian amateur champion between 1921 and 1929. Britten-Jones represented Australia in the 1936 Tasman Cup and she was the eight time Royal Adelaide Golf Club Associate Club Champion. She was the Royal Adelaide Golf Club Associate Club Captain in 1925 and from 1930 to 1932, Associate Club President from 1930 to 1950 and was awarded Associate Honorary Life Membership in 1952. Britten-Jones was SA Ladies Golf Union President and a delegate to the Australian Ladies Golf Union between 1932 and 1935. She also played tennis for SA in 1913.

Britten-Jones Drive in the Australian Capital Territory (Division of Holt) was named in her honour.

== Amateur wins ==
- Royal Adelaide Golf Club Club Championship: 1921, 1923, 1924, 1927, 1928, 1929, 1933, 1936
- South Australian Amateur: 1921, 1922, 1923, 1924, 1925, 1926, 1927, 1928, 1929

== Team appearances ==
- Tasman Cup (representing Australia): 1936 (winners)
