= Mona MacLeod =

Australian amateur golfer (1895–1953)

Personal information
- Full name: Ada Mona MacLeod
- Nationality: Australia
- Born: 7 June 1895 Penshurst, Victoria, Australia
- Died: 27 January 1953 (aged 57) Melbourne, Australia

Career
- Sport: Golf
- Status: Amateur

Ada Mona MacLeod (7 June 1895 – 27 January 1953) was an Australian amateur golfer. She won the Australian Women's Amateur in 1921, 1926, 1927 and 1932 and won the Victorian Women's Amateur Championship five times between 1925 and 1933.

== Golf career ==
MacLeod was runner-up in the 1919 Victorian Women's Amateur Championship behind Caroline Austin. She was tied with Violet Yuille but took the second prize after beating Yuille in an 18-hole playoff the following day. In September 1921 she won the Australian Women's Amateur for the first time. Played at Royal Melbourne she won by 14 strokes. The following month she was runner-up in the Victorian championship behind Gladys Hay and she was second again in 1922 behind Cecily Lascelles.

MacLeod spent much of 1923 in Europe. She played in the Women's Amateur Championship but lost in the first round to Lena Scroggie, a member of the Scottish team in the Women's Home Internationals that year.

In the 1924 Australian Women's Amateur Macleod led at the start of the final round. She finished second but was later disqualified for failing to replace her ball after it been moved by another competitor's ball. Macleod finished runner-up to Nellie Gatehouse in the 1925 Australian championship but won the Victorian championship for the first time. She won the 1926 Australian championship at Royal Adelaide, eight strokes ahead of Susie Tolhurst, and retained the Victorian title. MacLeod's run of successes continued in 1927 when she retained the Australian championship at Royal Melbourne. However she was disqualified in the Victorian championship after twice playing the wrong ball at the very first hole. She completed the round in 81, six strokes better than any other competitor.

In 1928 the two championships, Australian and Victorian, switched from 54-hole stroke-play to match-play. MacLeod reached the final of both events, She lost 9 and 8 to Nellie Gatehouse in the Australian championship at Royal Sydney, but beat Susie Tolhurst 3 and 2 in Victorian event, her third win in four years. She failed to reach either final in 1929, losing to Susie Tolhurst in the semi-finals of both championships.

MacLeod travelled to Europe again in 1930. She reached the quarter-finals of the Scottish Women's Amateur Championship before losing to the eventual winner, Helen Holm.

In MacLeod's absence in 1930, Susie Tolhurst had won both the Australian and Victorian championships. In 1931 MacLeod and Tolhurst met in the final of both events, Tolhurst winning both times. MacLeod won her fourth Victorian championship in 1932. Tolhurst was returning from Britain and missed the event. Tolhurst returned in time for the Australian championship at Kooyonga. The pair met in the quarter-finals, MacLeod winning narrowly. MacLeod went on to win her fourth Australian title, beating Jess Russell in the final.

MacLeod and Susie Tolhurst met again in the final of the 1933 Victorian championship, MacLeod winning her fifth title by a 9 and 8 margin. The first Tasman Cup match against New Zealand was played in 1933, between the qualifying for the Australian Women's Amateur and the match-play stage. Australia won 3 of the 4 singles matches in the morning but after lunch three of the five Australian players, including MacLeod, were unable to play in the foursomes because of illness, and they had to concede the second foursomes match. New Zealand won the foursomes match that was played and the match was tied at 3 matches each. The result was decided on holes won and, with the conceded match being scored as a 10 and 8 win, New Zealand won by 13 holes to 8. MacLeod had not fully recovered when the first round of the Australian championship match-play was played and lost 8 and 7 in the 18-hole match, failing to win a single hole.

MacLeod had health problems from 1934 for a few years. She played in two further Tasman Cup matches, in 1934 and 1936. She also reached the final of the Victorian Women's Amateur Championship in 1936 but had to concede the match to Susie Morpeth, the former Susie Tolhurst, when she was too ill to play.

MacLeod was president of the Victorian Ladies' Golf Union from 1948 until her death.

== Personal life ==
MacLeod was born on 7 June 1895 in Penshurst, Victoria, the eldest child of James Alexander MacLeod and Eveline Mary Kate née Grylls who had married in August 1894. James MacLeod was the manager of the National Bank in Penshurst. She died, unmarried, on 27 January 1953, aged 57.

== Team appearances ==
- Tasman Cup (representing Australia): 1933, 1934 (winners), 1936 (winners)
