= Trans Tasman Cup =

The Trans Tasman Cup was an amateur team golf event played between Australia and New Zealand. It was played annually from 2007 to 2010 and finally in 2012. It was made up of four different contests: men, women, boys and girls. Each of the four contests had been held previously, but these events were the first time they had been held together with an overall winner. The overall result was determined by the combined score from all four contests. It was held by Golf Australia and New Zealand Golf. Australia won all five events.

== Format ==
The event was played over two days. Each team was made up of 16 players, four players for each of the four different contests. Two foursomes and four singles matches were played each day. All matches were over 18 holes.

== 2007 event ==
The 2007 event was held on 22 and 23 February at the Royal Canberra Golf Club in Australia. Australia won the match 24½ to 23½, although they lost three of the four categories, only winning the girls event.

Team	Contest	Australia	New Zealand
Men	Sloan Morpeth Trophy	4	8
Women	Tasman Cup	5½	6½
Boys	Clare Higson Trophy	5½	6½
Girls	Junior Tasman Cup	9½	2½
Total	Trans Tasman Cup	24½	23½

== 2008 event ==
The 2008 event was held on 1 and 2 May at the Royal Wellington Golf Club in New Zealand. Australia won a rain-affected match 25 to 15.

Team	Contest	Australia	New Zealand
Men	Sloan Morpeth Trophy	5½	4½
Women	Tasman Cup	7	3
Boys	Clare Higson Trophy	5	5
Girls	Junior Tasman Cup	7½	2½
Total	Trans Tasman Cup	25	15

== 2009 event ==
The 2009 event was held on 3 and 4 March at the Royal Canberra Golf Club in Australia. Australia won 33 to 15. New Zealand won the women's Tasman Cup.

Team	Contest	Australia	New Zealand
Men	Sloan Morpeth Trophy	8	4
Women	Tasman Cup	5	7
Boys	Clare Higson Trophy	9	3
Girls	Junior Tasman Cup	11	1
Total	Trans Tasman Cup	33	15

== 2010 event ==
The 2010 event was held on 29 and 30 March at the Royal Wellington Golf Club in New Zealand. Australia won 31 to 17.

Team	Contest	Australia	New Zealand
Men	Sloan Morpeth Trophy	7½	4½
Women	Tasman Cup	9½	2½
Boys	Clare Higson Trophy	9½	2½
Girls	Junior Tasman Cup	4½	7½
Total	Trans Tasman Cup	31	17

== 2012 event ==
The 2012 event was held on 8 and 9 March at the Peninsula Country Golf Club in Frankston, Victoria. Australia won 34½ to 13½, although New Zealand regained the Sloan Morpeth Trophy.

Team	Contest	Australia	New Zealand
Men	Sloan Morpeth Trophy	5½	6½
Women	Tasman Cup	10	2
Boys	Clare Higson Trophy	9	3
Girls	Junior Tasman Cup	10	2
Total	Trans Tasman Cup	34½	13½
