= Joanne Mills =

Australian golfer

Personal information
- Full name: Joanne Nicole Mills
- Nationality: Australia
- Born: 18 December 1969 (age 56) Sydney, Australia
- Height: 1.70 m (5 ft 7 in)

Career
- Sport: Golf
- Turned professional: 1993
- Current tour: ALPG Tour
- Former tour: Ladies European Tour (1994-2010) LPGA Tour (2002-2005)
- Professional wins: 9

Number of wins by tour
- Ladies European Tour: 2
- WPGA Tour of Australasia: 7

Best results in LPGA major championships
- Chevron Championship: T70: 2004
- Women's PGA C'ship: T6: 2003
- U.S. Women's Open: CUT: 2004
- du Maurier Classic: DNP
- Women's British Open: T48: 2008

Joanne Nicole Mills (born 18 December 1969) is an Australian golfer, and former player on the Ladies European Tour.

Mills was born in Sydney, New South Wales. As an amateur, she won the 1991 New South Wales Strokeplay Championship, the 1992 Tasmanian Strokeplay Championship, and the 1993 Victoria Strokeplay Championship. After turning professional in 1993, she won the 1997 Ladies' German Open, and, ten years later in 2007, the S4/C Wales Ladies Championship of Europe. She also played on the LPGA Tour from 2002 to 2005.

Mills's father, Greg Mills, is a former secretary of the Ladies' Golf Union in the UK, and was the former CEO of Golf New South Wales.

== Professional wins ==
=== Ladies European Tour wins ===
- 1997 Ladies' German Open
- 2007 S4/C Wales Ladies Championship of Europe

=== ALPG Tour wins ===
- 1999 Betta Electrical Bega Ladies Classic
- 2000 Mandeni Ladies Plate
- 2001 Bega Ladies Classic
- 2002 Bega Ladies Classic
- 2006 LG Bing Lee Women's NSW Open
- 2008 Optus World Coraki Pro-Am
- 2010 St Georges Basin Country Club Pro-Am

== Team appearances ==
Amateur

- Espirito Santo Trophy: (representing Australia): 1992
- Tasman Cup (representing Australia): 1993 (winners)
- Queen Sirikit Cup (representing Australia): 1993
