= Joan Lewis =

American politician

Member of the Connecticut House of Representatives from the 8th district
- In office 2003–2011
- Preceded by: Patrick Flaherty
- Succeeded by: Tim Ackert

Personal details
- Party: Democratic

Joan Lewis is an American politician who served in the Connecticut House of Representatives from 2003 to 2011, representing the 8th district as a Democrat.
