= Geelong Golf Club =

Defunct golf club in Geelong, Victoria

Coordinates: 38°7′34″S 144°20′22″E

The Geelong Golf Club is a defunct golf club founded in 1892 and was the oldest in the state of Victoria, Australia. It was located in the northern Geelong suburb of North Geelong and maintained an 18-hole course bounded by Ballarat Road and bisected by Thompson Road.

The club ran into financial difficulties, $250,000 in 2001 and management of the club was taken over by PGA Links on 18 February 2002. Within 18 months, the sister company of PGA Links, Links Group had bought the Geelong Golf Club outright for $3.1 million. The 146 acres (59 ha) in the middle of Geelong was then valued at up to $18 million.

The Links Group hoped to build 200 houses and a new nine-hole course on the site, closed the course in July 2004 when the City of Greater Geelong denied planning permission for the scheme. A revised plan was put on public display in May 2005, and referred to an independent panel in November the same year. The site was then put up for sale, before being taken off the market in May 2008. with the site now value at between $20 million and $25 million. The site remains unoccupied as of 2008.

The golf course was closed for a number of years during its re-development of the site and has since re-opened as a nine-hole course.

Geelong Golf Club Residential Estate In late 2013 construction of the Geelong Golf Club Residential Estate began, with plans for 350 new homes, parks and 9-hole golf course included as a part of the redevelopment. Now in 2021 there is a 9-hole Golf course with housing skirting its fairways.
