= St Paul's Anglican Church, Geelong =

Anglican church in Geelong, Victoria, Australia

- St Paul's Church of England Church
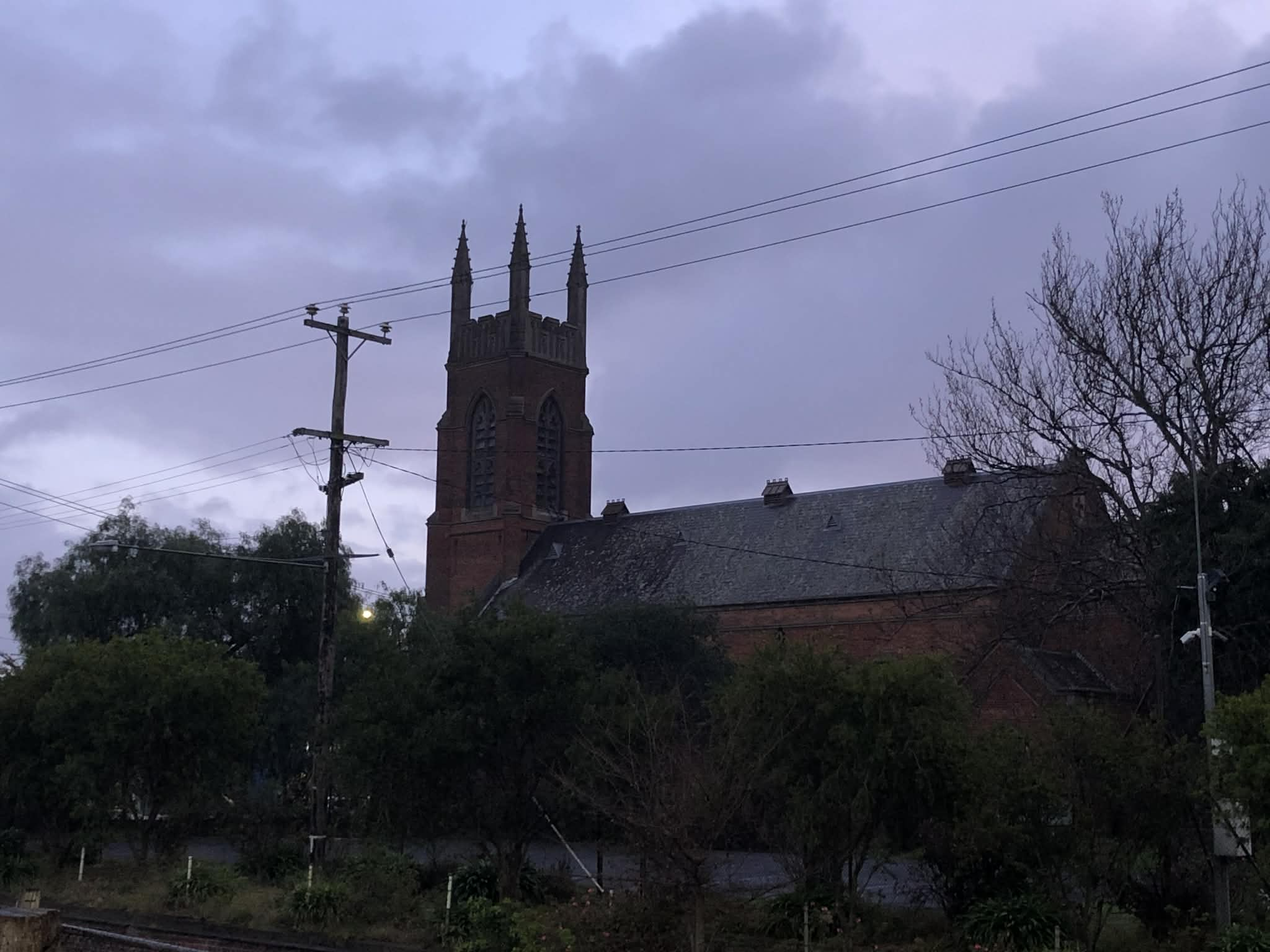
- St Paul's Anglican Church, 2024
- St Paul's Anglican Church, Geelong
- 38°08′33″S 144°21′14″E
- Location: 175 Latrobe Terrace, Geelong, Victoria
- Country: Australia
- Denomination: Anglican Church of Australia
- Website: stpaulsgeelong.org.au

History
- Status: Parish church

Architecture
- Functional status: Active
- Architects: Charles Laing; Edward Prowse; Friedrich Kawerau; Edward Snell
- Architectural type: Church
- Style: Gothic Revival
- Years built: 1850-1863 (later additions)
- Completed: 1863

Administration
- Province: Victoria
- Diocese: Melbourne

Clergy
- Vicar: Rev. Jennifer Furphy

Victorian Heritage Register
- Official name: St Paul's Anglican Church
- Type: Registered place
- Designated: 9 October 1974
- Reference no.: H0187
- Heritage overlay no.: HO15
- Category: Religion

The St Paul's Anglican Church is a Anglican church complex located on Latrobe Terrace, Geelong, Victoria, Australia. Constructed primarily between 1850 and 1863, the church is notable for its early use of face red brick, unusual timber internal columns, and prominent Gothic Revival tower.

== History ==
St Paul's Anglican Church was established in response to rapid growth of the township during the late 1840s. By this time, Geelong's population had increased approximately fourfold since 1847, accompanied by substantial commercial and residential development. The existing Anglican church, Christ Church in Moorabool Street, completed in 1847, soon proved inadequate for the expanding congregation.

In 1848, the colonial government granted land on Latrobe Terrace, Ashby (present-day Geelong West), for the construction of a new Anglican church. Bishop Charles Perry, the first Bishop of Melbourne, directed Archdeacon Hussey Burgh Macartney to oversee the establishment of the new parish. By the end of that year, a parsonage and a weatherboard schoolroom had been completed on the site, providing the early focus for Anglican worship and education in the area.

The church was designed in 1849 by the architect Charles Laing, an early Melbourne practitioner then based in Geelong, who was responsible for a number of prominent buildings in the region and later designed major portions of St Peter's Church, Eastern Hill, in Melbourne. The foundation stone of St Paul's was laid by Bishop Perry on 2 December 1850, following the turning of the first sod by Governor Charles J. La Trobe.

Construction commenced in 1850 but was soon interrupted by the Victorian gold rush, which caused widespread labour shortages as tradespeople left Geelong for the goldfields. As a result, progress on the building was slow, and the church remained incomplete for several years. During this period, the Reverend Theodore Carlos Benoni Stretch, who arrived in Geelong in 1852 and was appointed Minister of Geelong and its suburbs, erected a tent within the unfinished walls of the church so that services could continue to be held on the site.

The roof of the church was completed in early 1854, allowing the building to be opened for worship in May of that year. Reverend Stretch was subsequently licensed as the first Vicar of St Paul's in 1855. Internal plastering was completed in the same year, although the church was not considered fully complete until 1863, when the chancel was extended. Architectural supervision for these later stages was undertaken by the Geelong firms Snell and Kawerau (Edward Snell and Friedrich Kawerau) and later Snell and Prowse (Edward Prowse), after Friedrich returned to Germany.

In 1865, a substantial brick tower was added to the church, designed by Leonard Terry, then serving as the Anglican diocesan architect. The tower's bold Gothic character, large plan area, and crenellated parapet with corner turrets made it a prominent landmark within Geelong. Further liturgical development occurred in 1877 with the opening of a new sanctuary, and various repair and restoration works were undertaken from the late nineteenth century onwards.

The growth of parish life during the late nineteenth century led to the construction of several associated hall buildings. In 1880, a brick Sunday School building, later known as the Parish Hall, was erected to a design by the prolific Geelong architectural firm Alexander Davidson and Co. This was followed in 1884 by the construction of the Infant School, later known as the Choir Hall. Both buildings were constructed in brick with steeply pitched slate roofs and reflected a more picturesque Gothic Revival style than the earlier church building. Their architectural detailing including trefoil openings and prominent chimney forms, reflected the influence of nineteenth-century French architect and theorist Eugène Viollet-le-Duc and were strongly associated with the emphasis on religious education promoted by the Reverend Canon Chalmers, incumbent of St Paul's during the 1880s.

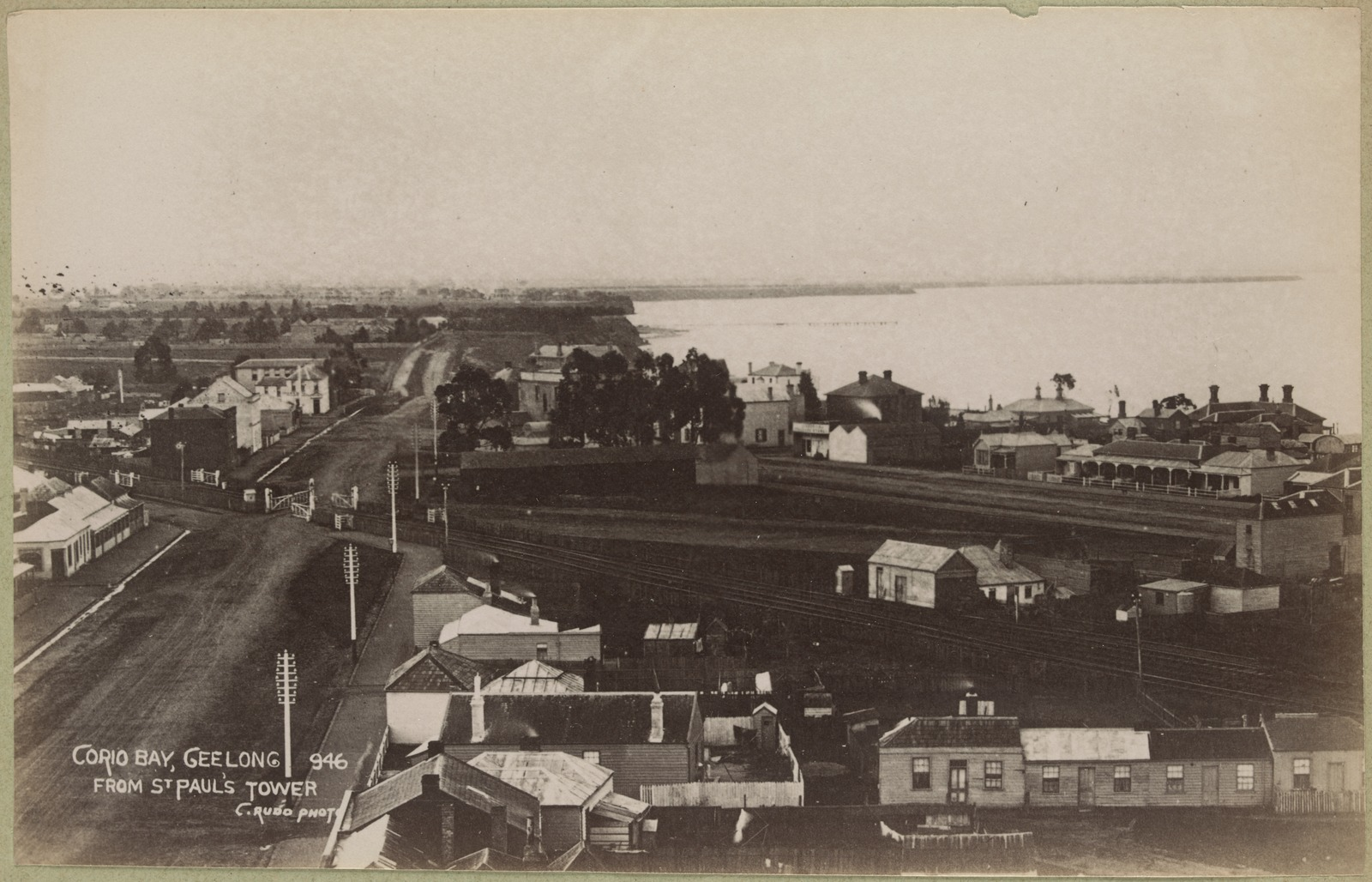
Corio Bay viewed from the tower of St Paul's, in the 1890s.

A third hall, known as the Union Hall, was constructed in 1891 for the St Paul's Church Union, an organisation established to promote the physical, mental, and spiritual improvement of men within the parish. Designed by the local firm Laird and Barlow, the timber hall featured simple Gothic detailing and was originally located elsewhere on the site. Following several relocations, it was moved to its present position in 1978.

Throughout the twentieth century, St Paul's underwent a series of major renovations and conservation works, including significant campaigns in 1899, 1904, 1954, 1976, and 2004. In 1982, the tower was structurally strengthened and the bells were refitted. In 2008, all slate roofs across the church and associated hall buildings were replaced with Welsh slate. More recently, an audiovisual system enabling livestreaming of services was installed in 2020 in response to COVID-19 restrictions, and refurbishment of the church organ was completed in 2023, continuing the long-standing musical tradition of the parish.

== See also ==
- St George's Presbyterian Church, Geelong
- St Paul's Cathedral, Melbourne
- St Mary of the Angels Basilica, Geelong
