= Royal District Nursing Service =

Royal District Nursing Service may refer to:

- Royal District Nursing Service (South Australia), Australia
- Royal District Nursing Service (Victoria), Australia
