= Kernot =

Kernot is a surname. Notable people with the surname include:

- Cheryl Kernot (born 1948), Australian politician and academic
- Betty Kernot, Australian golfer
- Edith Latham Kernot, Australian community worker in Geelong
- William Charles Kernot (1845–1909), Australian engineer

== See also ==
- Kernot railway station
