= Crosby Homes =

British housebuilding business

- Industry: Housebuilding
- Founded: 1920s
- Headquarters: Solihull, England
- Products: Residential dwellings and apartments
- Parent: Lendlease

Crosby Homes was a major British residential housebuilding business. It was acquired by the Australian developer Lendlease in 2005 and the Crosby name was discontinued during the early 2010s.

== History ==
Crosby Homes was established in the mid-1920s by James Crosby to build houses in north Cheshire. During the Second World War, the firm turned to civil engineering and contracting but returned to housebuilding in the late 1950s, when it specialised in building executive housing. During 1986, the Crosby family sold out to a management buyout; three years later, the company was floated on the London Stock Exchange; at that time, the company was predominantly building in north Cheshire and south Lancashire.

In response to the early 1990s recession, the company reduced the dividend in 1990. That same year, rumours of takeover talks with Bryant Homes and Persimmon were denied. During 1991, Crosby was acquired by Berkeley Group Holdings in exchange for £10.9 million. Throughout the 1990s, the business underwent substantial expansion, which was concentrated on city centre development schemes from Birmingham north to Newcastle.

During September 2003, it was reported that Berkeley were looking to sell Crosby, even though the unit was responsible for generating 21 per cent of group turnover. Later that same year, as part of Berkeley's restructuring, a 51 percent stake in Crosby was sold by Berkeley on deferred terms to its management team. Two years later, the Australia-based developer Lendlease purchased the firm in exchange for £261 million; a company spokesperson stated that the transaction would give Lend Lease access to the buy-to-let market and aid it in bidding for mixed-use projects with large residential elements, such as with the planned redevelopment of land near to the Millennium Dome. In the aftermath of the takeover, the company was renamed Crosby Lend Lease; in turn, this brand was discontinued during the early 2011s.
