= IHG Army Hotels =

American hotel company

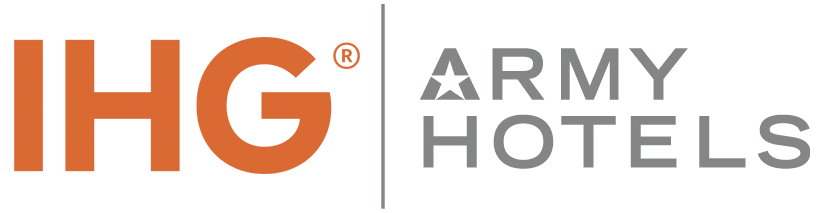
- Company type: On-post lodgings and branded hotels for United States Army
- Industry: Hotel
- Founded: 2006 (contract awarded); 2009 (operations began)
- Founder: IHG Hotels & Resorts and Lendlease partnership
- Headquarters: United States
- Number of locations: 41
- Area served: United States, including Puerto Rico
- Parent: IHG Hotels & Resorts
- Website: www.ihgarmyhotels.com

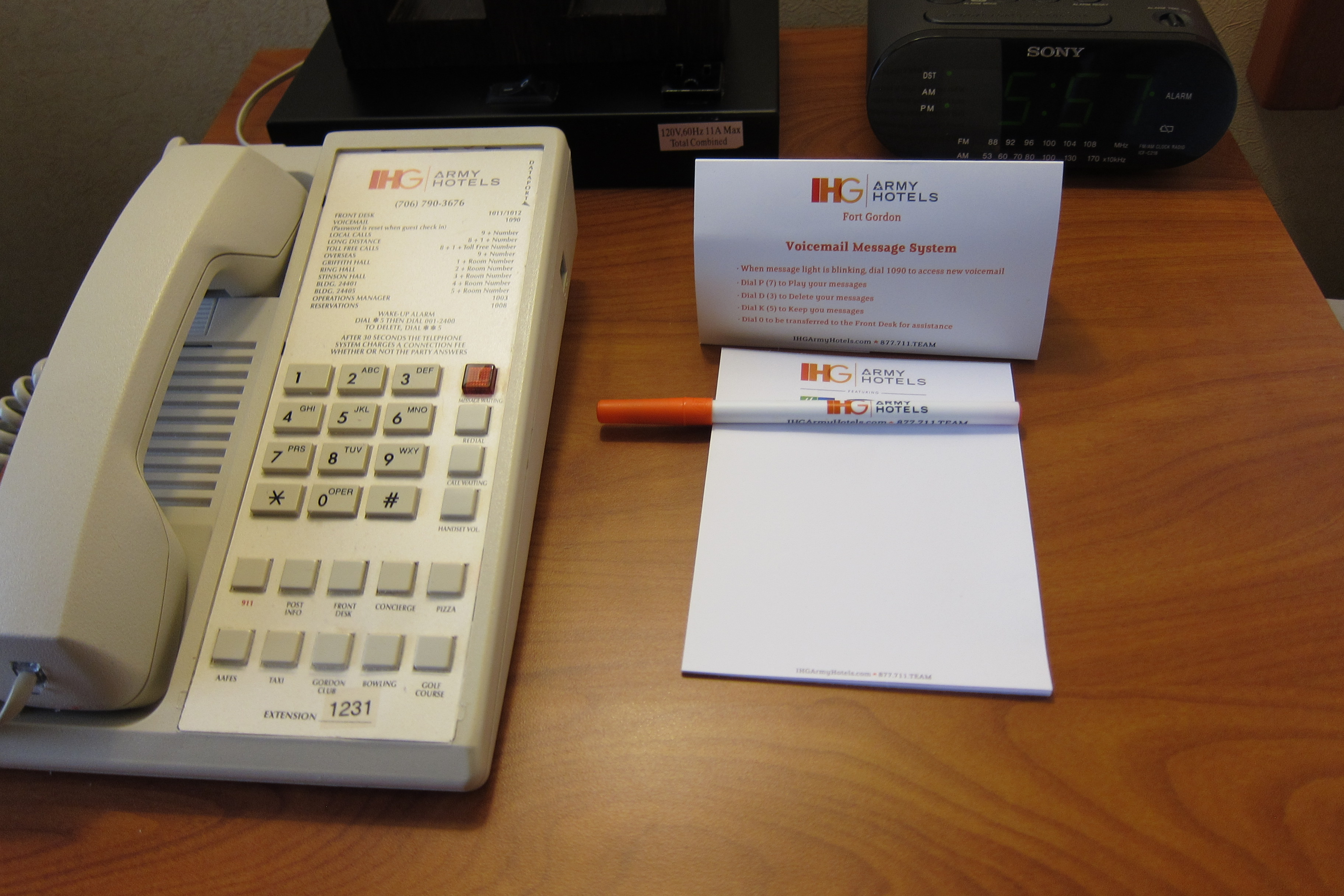
Guest amenities at IHG Army Hotels on Fort Gordon

IHG Army Hotels is a collection of private-sector hotels located on Army installations and Joint Bases throughout the United States. It is the result of a partnership between IHG Hotels & Resorts (IHG), Holiday Inn Express (IHG), and Lendlease. This partnership was formed in response to the Privatization of Army Lodging (PAL) program by the United States Army. The army's request for qualifications (RFQ) sought to fulfill specific requirements that included improving the quality of on-post lodgings throughout the U.S., Alaska, Hawaii and Puerto Rico. This RFQ sought entities with experience in the management of room inventory and hotel service, expertise in construction, and financing experience relating to the upgrades and renovations of existing on-post Army lodgings. The United States Army awarded the PAL program to Lendlease with a 50-year lease deal, and IHG, with a 25-year management agreement with options to extend. As part of the RFP agreement, these hotels provide lodging to service members of all branches of the U.S. Armed Forces, government and civilian contractors, military families, veterans, civilians and retirees. There are 76 IHG-branded hotels with about 11,600 rooms located on Army bases in the U.S., Alaska, Hawaii, and Puerto Rico.

== History ==
After being awarded the PAL program in 2006, IHG Army Hotels began the first phase of the PAL takeover in 2009 with hotels on 10 posts. During this time, on-post lodgings underwent upgrades, renovations, and or new builds. IHG Army Hotels transformed these lodgings to meet basic standards for guests that included improved amenities, such as complimentary breakfast and wireless Internet. Additional amenities at IHG Army Hotels were designed to cater to military travelers that include weekly barbecues, complimentary on-post shuttle services, and free laundry facilities. In 2010, the first on-post Holiday Inn Express opened on Fort Polk, Louisiana. In 2011, 11 additional posts were added under IHG Army Hotels purview as part of the PAL program; with the addition of 18 posts in 2013. As of 2014, IHG Army Hotels operate upgraded and renovated military lodgings, Holiday Inn Express, Staybridge Suites, and Candlewood Suites on 41 Army posts.

== In the community ==
IHG Army Hotels is involved with the Fisher House Foundation and Building for America's Bravest, a program of the Stephen Siller Tunnel to Towers Foundation. Since 2010, almost $500,000 has been raised to support local Fisher House Foundation projects nearby IHG Army Hotels. In 2011, IHG Army Hotels proposed an initiative to train and hire wounded warriors, working with the Army and off post organizations via the IHG Academy. These initiatives were approved by the Pentagon, and IHG now trains former military soldiers for skills needed for success in the hospitality industry.

== Notable properties ==
- Fort Riley and Yuma Proving Ground have the first two Candlewood Suites hotels on post in the IHG Army Hotels system. They opened in December 2013.
- Fort Polk has the first-ever Holiday Inn Express to open on a military installation
- Joint Base San Antonio: Largest Candlewood Suites (310 rooms) opened on-post as part of the PAL program
- IHG Army Hotels operates the largest on-post hotel property on Fort Leonard Wood, with 1,644 guest rooms
- Joint Base Myer-Henderson Hall has a building in the Historia Collection

== Gallery ==
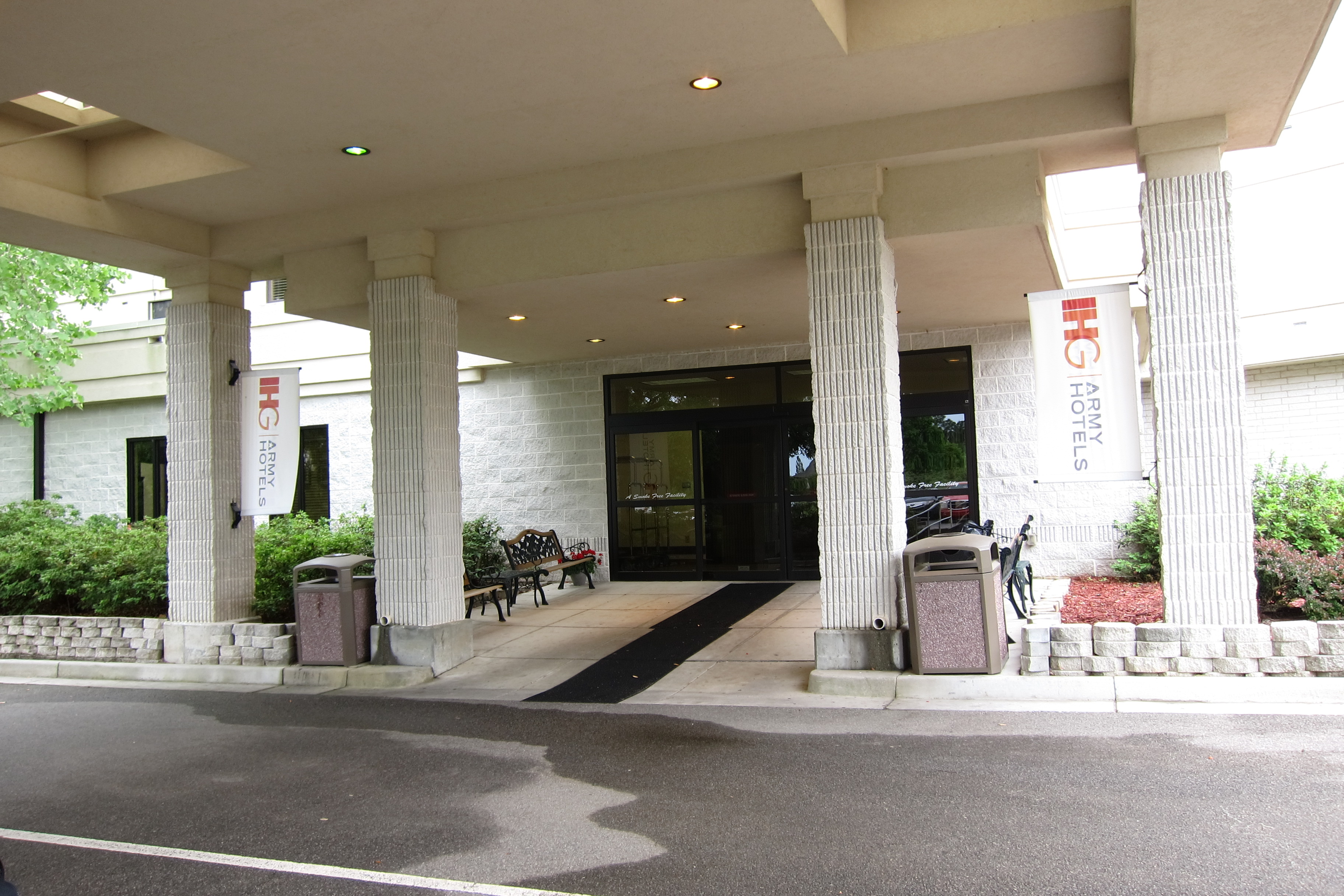
Entrance to IHG Army Hotel on Fort Gordon

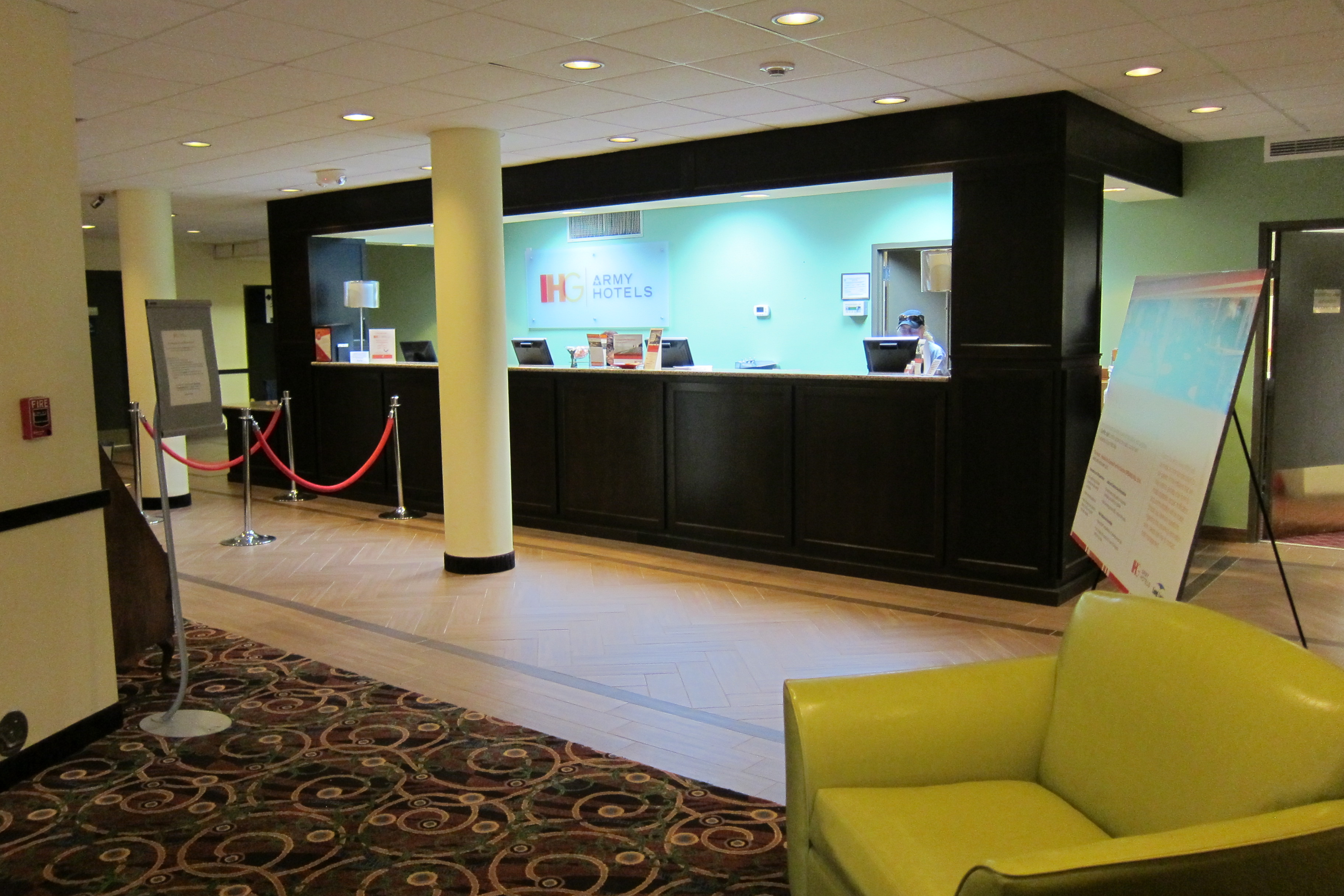
Check-In at IHG Army Hotel on Fort Gordon

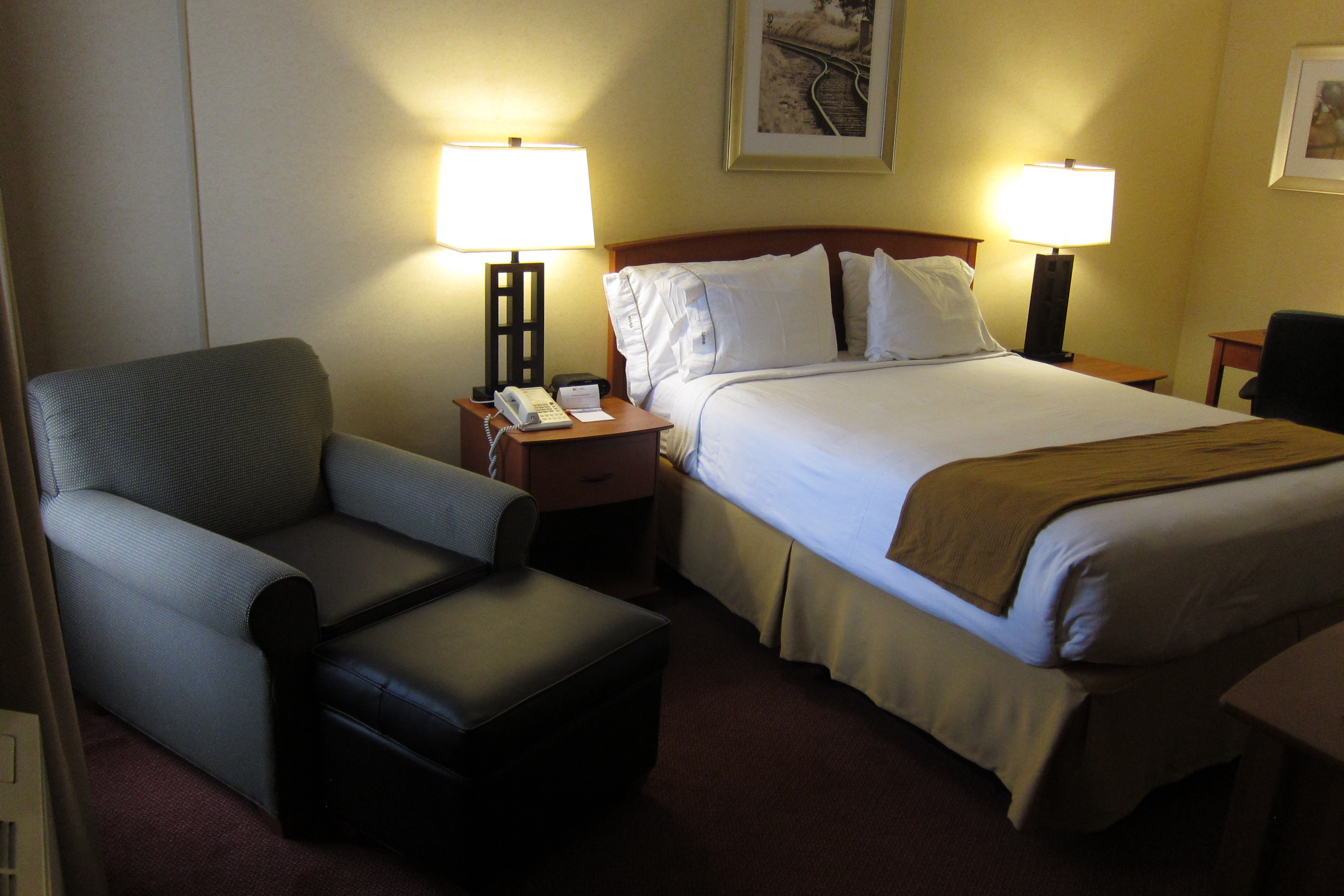
Guest room at IHG Army Hotel on Fort Gordon
