= Lendlease =

Australia-based construction and real estate company

Lendlease Corporation Limited

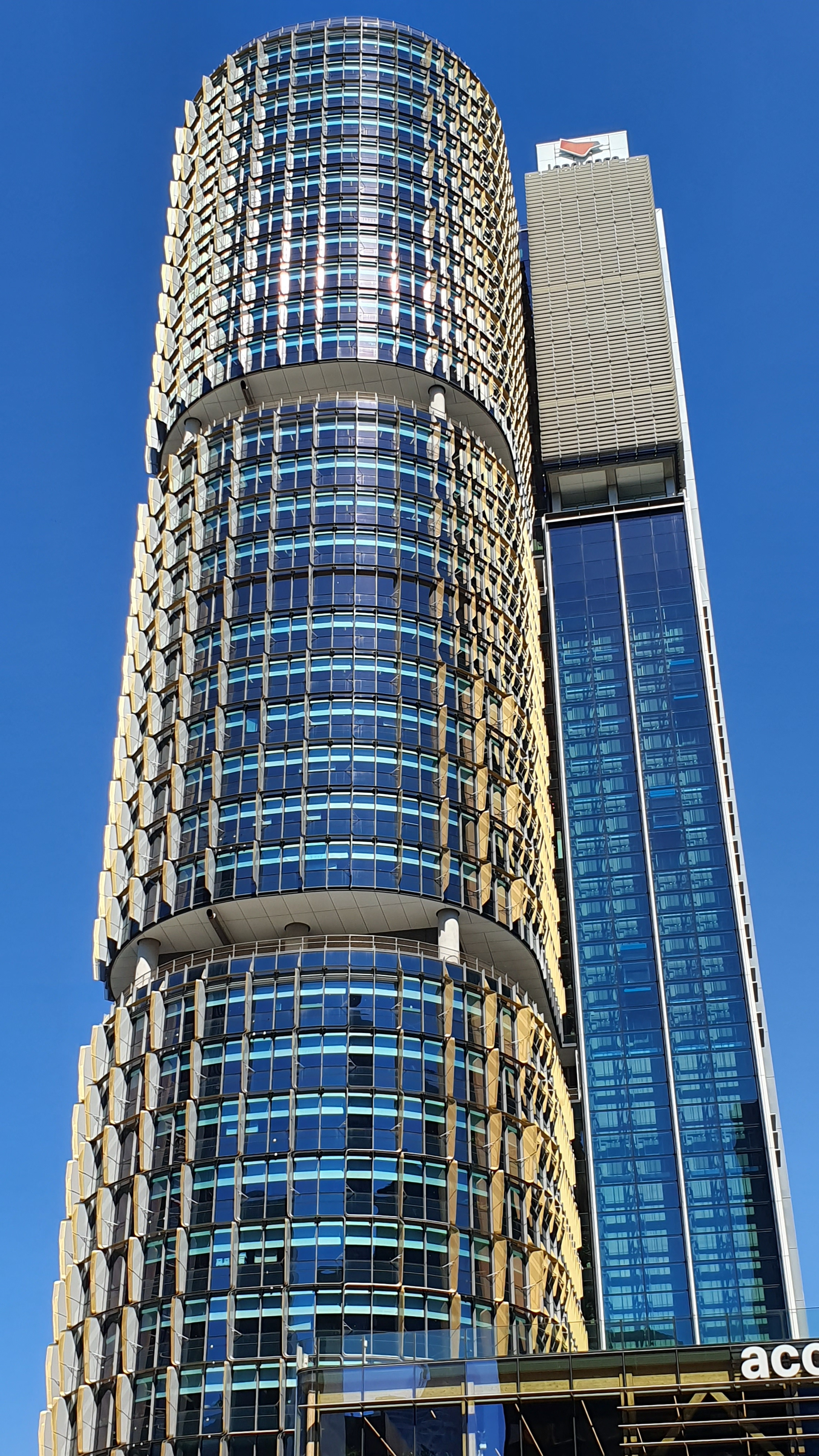
- Lendlease's headquarters at Tower 3 of the International Towers complex, Barangaroo, Sydney
- Type: Public
- Traded as: ASX: LLC
- Industry: Investment, Construction and Real estate
- Founded: 1958; 68 years ago (Sydney)
- Headquarters: International Towers; Barangaroo, Sydney, Australia
- Area served: Worldwide
- Key people: Michael J. Ullmer, AO (Chairman); Nick O'Neil (Group CEO and Managing Director)
- Products: Asset and property management, Building, Infrastructure Development, Investment Management and Services, Asset and Investment Legal Services.
- Revenue: ▼AUD$8,822 million (2022)
- Operating income: ▼AUD$(61) million (2022)
- Net income: ▼AUD$(99) million (2022)
- Number of employees: Approx. 8,500 (2022)
- Website: lendlease.com

Lendlease Corporation Limited is an Australian multinational construction and real estate company, headquartered in Barangaroo, Sydney, New South Wales.

== History ==
=== Founding ===
The company was established as Lendlease by Dick Dusseldorp in 1958 to provide finance for building contracts being undertaken by Civil & Civic. In 1961, the company acquired Civil & Civic from Bredero's Bouwbedrijf.

Lendlease first listed on the ASX in 1962. Operations expanded to the United States in 1971 and to Singapore in 1973.

In 1982, Lendlease acquired 50% of MLC and in 1985 acquired the balance of the company. MLC's multi-manager, multi-style investment philosophy was introduced in 1986. It was later sold to National Australia Bank in the year 2000 for $4.56 billion, one of the biggest mergers in Australian corporate history.

=== Expansion and major acquisition ===
In 1999, the company formed Actus Lendlease with the acquisition of Actus Corporation's MILCON and technical service construction management business, and augmented this business with professionals from Lendlease Design and Lendlease Development. Around this time, the company also acquired the British-based builder Bovis Construction from P&O. During 2000, it bought Amresco's commercial mortgage business. One year later, Lendlease acquired Delfin (now Lendlease Communities) for $172 million. It went on to buy Crosby Homes (now Lendlease Residential Development) for circa £240 million in 2005.

=== Barangaroo, Valemus Acquisition, One Lendlease Era ===
In 2009, Steve McCann was appointed CEO. In the same year Lendlease Corporation acquired Babcock and Brown Communities, rebranding the business as Lendlease Primelife. At the time, this acquisition made Lendlease Australia's largest provider of retirement villages.

In December 2009, Lendlease was selected by the New South Wales Government to develop Barangaroo.

In 2010, Lendlease announced their first foray into the consumer market with Lendlease Solar. This subsidiary was wound up in early 2011, with no explanation as to why the division had closed.

On 17 February 2011 Lendlease announced wider ranging changes to its group of brands. This announcement meant the retirement of the Bovis, Delfin, Vivas, Catalyst and Primelife brands which were superseded by the unified Lendlease brand.

In late February 2011, Lendlease acquired DASCO in order to position itself to take advantage of the impending Obama administration Health sector boom. The company was immediately rebranded as Lendlease DASCO, and started operating independently of the Lendlease Americas business.

In March 2011, Lendlease completed the acquisition of Valemus (previously known as Bilfinger Berger Australia) from Bilfinger.

In March 2013, the business divested its aged care homes (from the acquisition of Babcock and Brown Communities) to Allity, a business owned by Australian Aged Care Partners.

In 2015, the company rebranded to use "Lendlease" as a single word.

In December 2016, Lendlease formed a joint venture agreement with Energy Made Clean. Energy Made Clean is a wholly owned subsidiary of renewable energy technology developer, Carnegie Clean Energy (ASX: CCE). With EMC and Carnegie's joint offerings, it is the only company in the world to offer a combination of wave, solar, wind, storage and desalination via microgrids. Microgrids are a budding industry and this partnership aims to provide end-to-end technologies that deliver energy independence and a reliable alternative to traditional forms of energy in regional, remote and fringe-of-grid locations in Australia, United States and around the world. This asset was later sold in 2020.

In February 2021, Lendlease announced that Tony Lombardo, previously CEO of Lendlease Asia, would takeover from Steve McCann as Group CEO. This took place in June 2021.

In February 2022, Lendlease reported a first half loss of $264 million, which it attributed to one-off restructuring costs, COVID-19 issues and asset sales. The company cut about 360 jobs and garnered savings of $160 million. An improved second half to the financial year saw the company post a bottom-line loss of $99 million for the full year, after $333 million in writedowns on existing operations, a 61% drop in development EBITDA to $18 million and a 24% slump in construction earnings to $131 million.

=== Australia focus ===
In May 2024, Lendlease announced plans to sell its overseas operations and to be focused on its domestic operations in Australia by late 2025. It described its overseas markets as a "drag" on shareholder returns; its new strategy will focus on simplifying the firm's structure, reducing costs and leveraging its competitive strengths.

On 1 January 2025, Lendlease announced the sale of its UK construction business to US private equity business Atlas Holdings for £35 million, with completion targeted before the end of June 2025. The deal was completed in March 2025 when the business was renamed Bovis, resurrecting a brand retired in 2011.

== Regions ==
Lendlease operates across four regional subdivisions:

=== Australia ===
Lendlease's regeneration projects include Barangaroo South in Sydney, Docklands, Victoria in Melbourne, the RNA Showgrounds in Brisbane, and Adelaide Oval in Adelaide.

One of Lendlease's more controversial communities projects is their development for housing and industry of the former Australian Defence Industries (ADI) land at St Marys (Ropes Crossing & Jordan Springs) in Western Sydney. Some of the group's major communities projects include Springfield Lakes, Queensland. Their ADI property is the largest intact area of the biodiverse and endangered plant community, the "Cumberland Plain Woodland".

=== Asia ===
Lendlease Asia has been working on two large urban development projects: The Exchange TRX (previously known as TRX Lifestyle Quarter) in Kuala Lumpur, Malaysia, and Paya Lebar Quarter in Singapore.

=== Americas ===
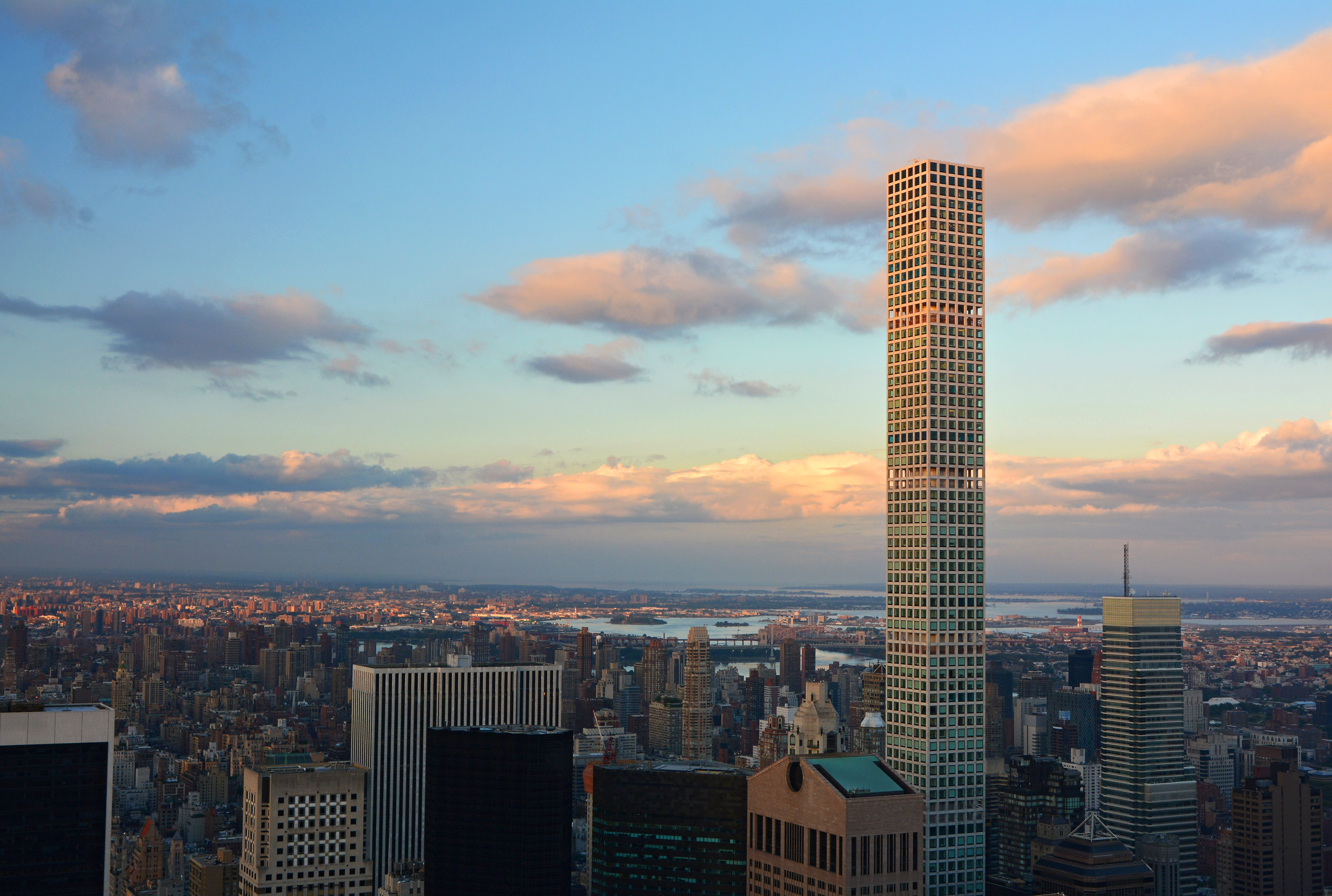
Lendlease built the western hemisphere's tallest residential tower, standing at 425 m (1,394 ft) tall.

Lendlease Project Management & Construction (previously Bovis Lendlease) provided construction management services for the National September 11 Memorial & Museum in New York, in addition to a number of other major public buildings throughout the U.S. A Public Private Partnership involved InterContinental Hotels Group and Lendlease, where they joined forces in the Privatization of Army Lodging to deliver quality hotels to United States Army Soldiers, their Families, and official guests of the United States Army. This partnership created IHG Army Hotels, a division of InterContinental Hotels Group. Other urban regeneration projects include Southbank, an area of Chicago, Illinois.

Soaring Heights, a 6 MW solar development at Davis-Monthan AFB, Tucson, Arizona, United States, is a large Public Partnerships business in the US.

=== Europe ===
In Europe, major urban regeneration programmes are underway in Elephant and Castle as Elephant Park, and in Stratford, London, as The International Quarter London. Lendlease also worked as project manager on a new township at Durrat Al Bahrain on Bahrain Island.

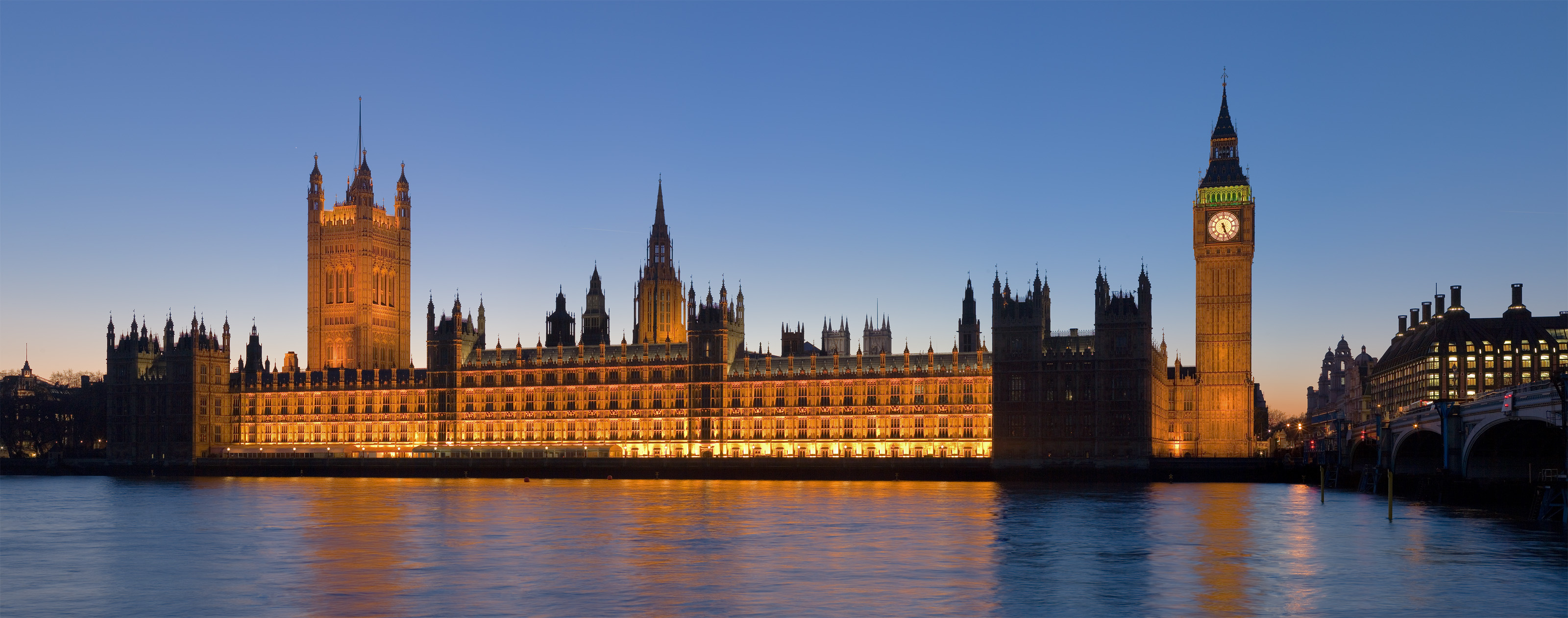
Lendlease oversaw the restoration of the encaustic tile pavements at Palace of Westminster in 2015.

In Europe, Lendlease Project Management & Construction provide project management and construction services for new projects and programmes. In 2015, Lendlease oversaw the restoration of the encaustic tile pavements at The Houses of Parliament.

== Major projects and operations ==
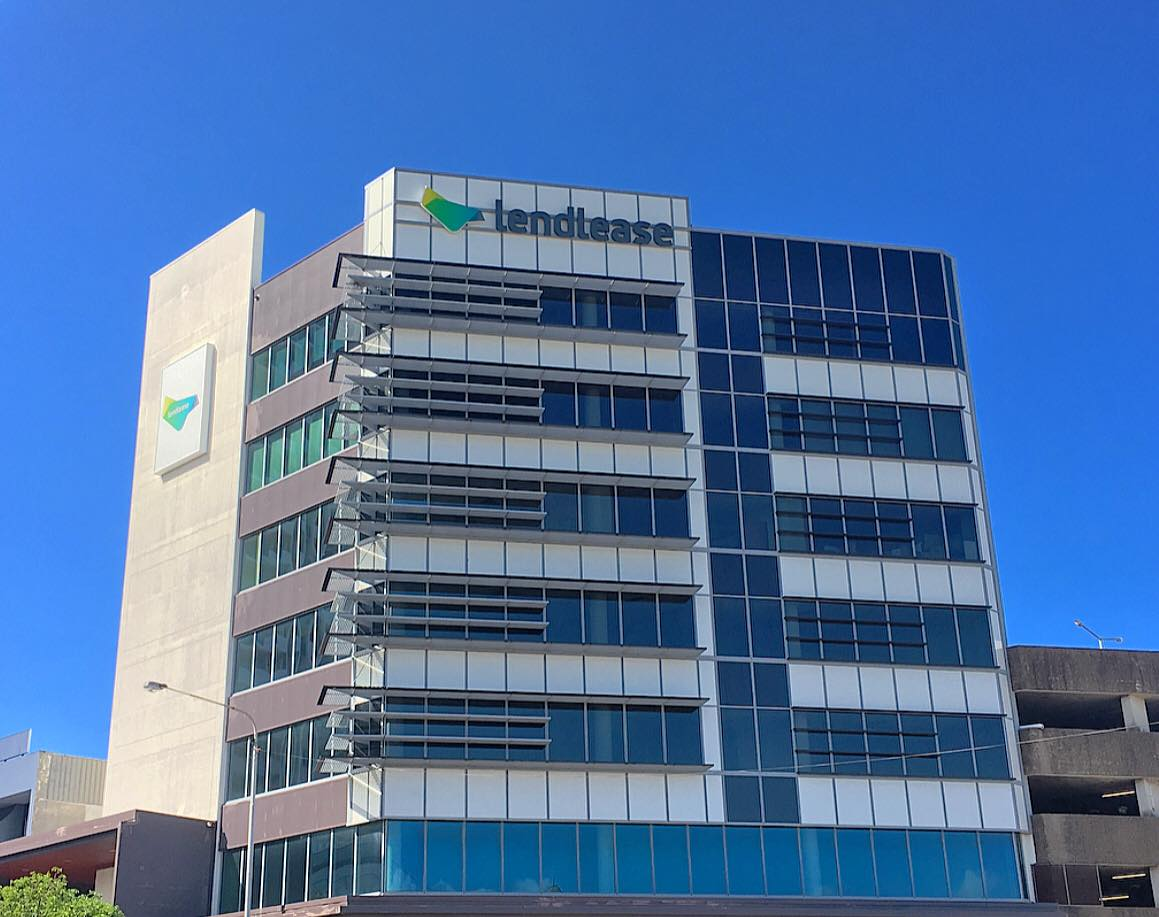
The Lendlease Tower in Townsville City, Australia

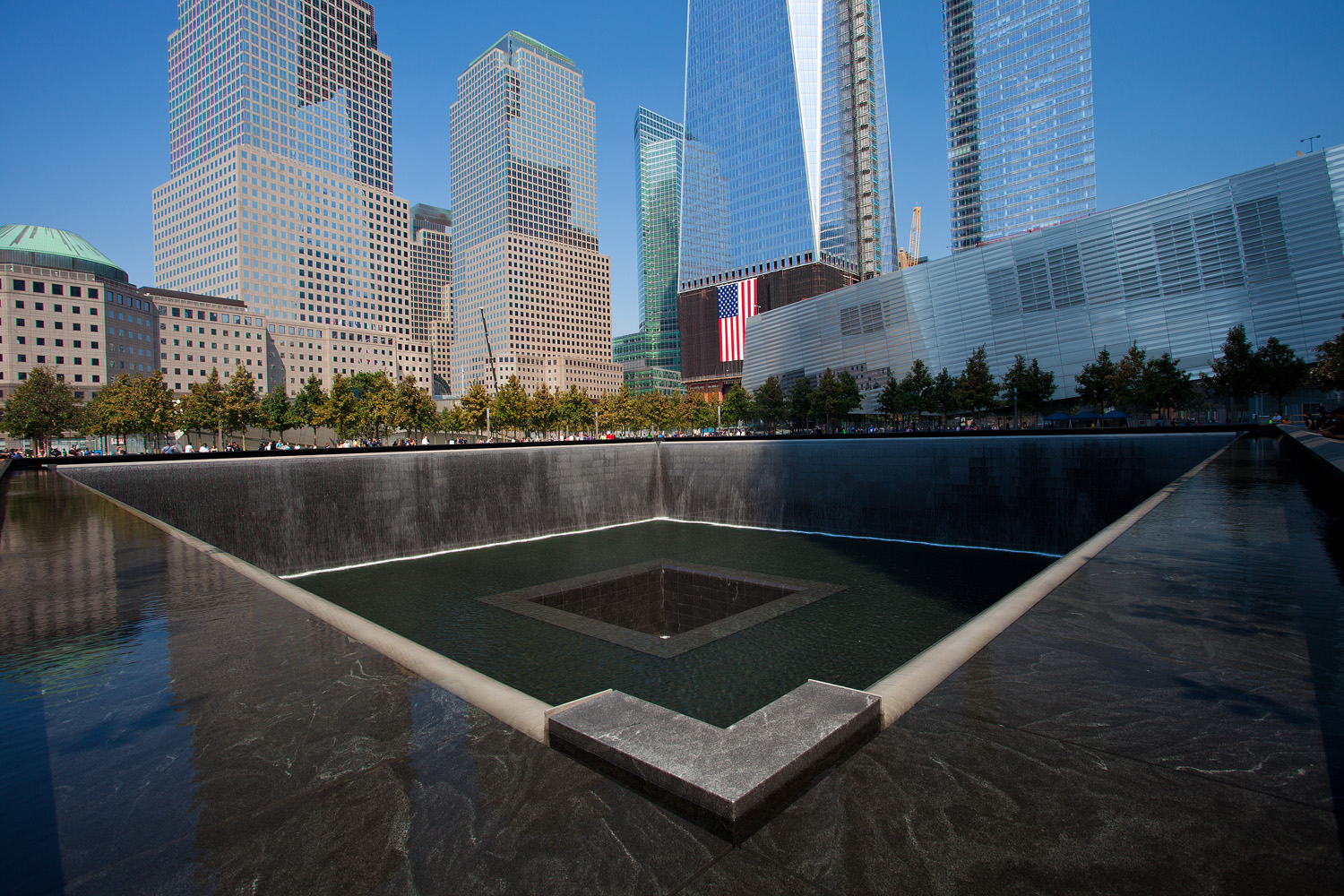
National September 11 Memorial/Ground Zero Memorial, New York City

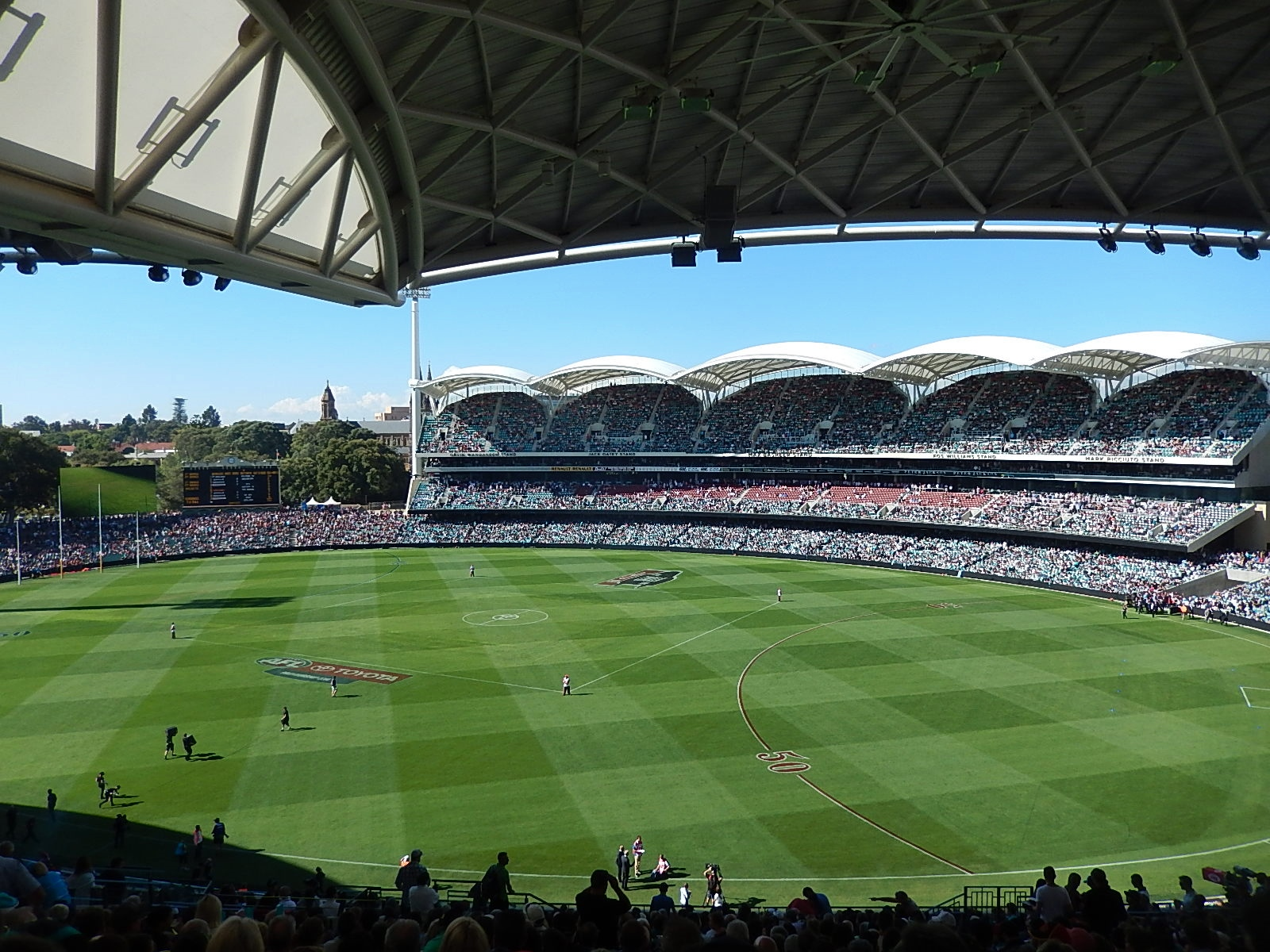
Adelaide Oval Redevelopment, finished in 2014

Major construction projects carried out by the company include:

- the refurbishment of Glasgow Central Station completed in 2000
- the National Museum of Australia completed in 2001
- the Chicagoland Speedway in Illinois completed in 2001
- the Calderdale Royal Hospital completed in 2001
- the refurbishment of HM Treasury Main Building completed in 2002
- the Worcestershire Royal Hospital completed in 2002
- Endeavour House completed in 2003
- the Scottish Parliament Building completed in 2004
- the Chapelfield Shopping Centre in Norwich completed in 2005
- Bridgewater Place in Leeds completed in 2006
- Queen's Hospital in Romford completed in 2006
- Queen Mary's Hospital in Roehampton completed in 2006
- St James's Institute of Oncology in Leeds completed in 2007
- Leicester Performing Arts Centre completed in 2008
- the Trump International Hotel and Tower in Chicago completed in 2009
- the Broadgate Tower and 201 Bishopsgate in London completed in 2009
- Royal Manchester Children's Hospital completed in 2009
- the Burnley and Nelson sections of the Lancashire BSF project, completed in 2010
- the Trump SoHo in New York City completed in 2010
- the refurbishment of the BBC Headquarters in London completed in 2011
- the National September 11 Memorial & Museum in New York City completed in 2011
- MediaCityUK in Salford completed in 2011
- Athletes' Village for 2012 Summer Olympics in London completed in 2012
- One57 in New York City completed in 2014
- Dr Chau Chak Wing Building in Sydney completed in 2014
- 50 United Nations Plaza in New York City completed in 2015
- 432 Park Avenue in New York City completed in 2015
- Northumbria Specialist Emergency Care Hospital, Cramlington, UK, completed in 2015. (In February 2021, the NHS trust began court action against Lendlease over structural defects identified in the building. A trial is due to start in October 2022.)
- International Towers, Sydney in Barangaroo, Sydney completed in 2016
- the International Convention Centre Sydney completed in 2016
- 53W53 in New York City completed in 2019
- Western Sydney Stadium in Parramatta, Sydney completed in 2019
- Redevelopment of Darling Harbour as Darling Square completed in 2019
- NorthConnex in Sydney completed in 2020
- Google's UK Headquarters at King's Cross in London completed in 2020
- Crown Sydney located in Barangaroo, Sydney completed in 2020

== Controversy and incidents ==
In 2008, the company and a subcontractor abatement firm, the John Galt Corporation, were charged with numerous OSHA safety violations after a fire broke out and killed two firefighters at the Deutsche Bank Building, a Manhattan skyscraper being demolished in the wake of the September 11 attacks. The violations included an employee (Safety Manager) of "Lendlease's Project Management & Construction Business" filling out a safety check list that identified a stand-pipe as being present and functional - when it was actually disconnected in a hard to see spot. The firemen consulted the check list, thought they had a good system and proceeded up into the building to fight the fire. Only when they reached the dangerous area that was on fire, did they realise the system did not have any water pressure, and they died trying to retreat amid the confusion. As of June 2011, two out of the three individuals charged in the associated manslaughter and criminally negligent homicide case have been acquitted.

In 2012, Lendlease agreed to pay $56 million in fines and restitution after admitting that the company had routinely over-billed clients and evaded government rules regarding the hiring of women and minority-owned firms. For a ten-year time span ending in 2009, the company along with others devised a scheme to defraud federal, state and local government contracting agencies as well as private clients. The fine is the largest in the city's history.

On 29 October 2012 the long boom of a Lendlease construction crane atop the 1,004 foot high One57 snapped during Hurricane Sandy forcing the evacuation of several buildings in Midtown Manhattan.

In October 2018, Lendlease was announced as a contender for a £330 million contract to renovate Manchester Town Hall. Manchester's Opposition Leader and former MP John Leech uncovered a history of legal, ethical and worker safety controversy surrounding the two shortlisted companies (Laing O'Rourke and Lendlease). He said that "Under absolutely no circumstances" should Lendlease ever be considered for a council contract again until they paid a £3 million Grenfell-style cladding bill in the Green Quarter of Manchester. In January 2019, Lendlease was announced as the winner of the contract. Leech criticised the decision and said it showed a lack of concern for local people.

A 23-year-old worker was killed and two others seriously injured in October 2020 on a Lendlease construction site at Curtin University in Western Australia. This occurred when the roof on the new School of Design and the Built Environment building collapsed.

Lendlease has been criticised for the Figtree Hill development, near the Gilead area of south-west Sydney, due to its land clearing and development threatening the only healthy and growing Koala population in New South Wales. Koalas were uplisted to endangered in 2022, facing population declines due to habitat loss caused by catastrophic bushfires, encroaching urban development and chlamydia. Lendlease proposed nature corridors to allow Koala populations to cross between habitats either side of developments. Environmental groups raised concern over the narrowness of corridors and how effective it would be. Lendlease sold the development to Stocklands midway through delivering the first Koala underpass to cross Alpin road, and refused to allow Stocklands access to the other side of the road to complete the underpass, leaving Koala populations stranded.
