= Edward Prowse =

- Born: 1824; Bristol, England
- Died: 2 January 1862 (aged 37–38); Geelong, Australia
- Occupation: Architect
- Spouse: Mary Ann Carbin (nee South)
- Children: Ada Mary (Lewis) 1858-25 August 1933; miss E. M. died after 1933; son born 27 February 1856; son born 24 August 1852 and possibly 5 others;
- Parent(s): Dr D. J. Prowse, Bristol England; Mary Anne Philpot
- Projects: The Hermitage, The Heights, St. Paul's Church of England, Geelong

Edward Prowse (1824 – 2 January 1862) was an architect working in the Geelong region of Victoria, Australia in the late nineteenth century. He was responsible for many early Geelong buildings, including hotels, mansions and churches.

== Early life ==
Edward Prowse was born in 1824 in the Bristol region in England. Prowse emigrated to Australia at the age of 25 with his friend Edward Snell, having first considered America. He arrived in Adelaide on the Bolton on 29 November 1849. Prowse and Snell met at the Avonside Ironworks in Bristol, Snell called him 'one of the respectables'. Prowse introduced Snell to the writings of Thomas Paine and almost succeeded in converting him to deism, prompting something of a crisis of faith.

Prowse married Mary Ann Carbin (née South) in Geelong, Mary Anne, had previously been married to Thomas Carbin of Adelaide. Eward and Mary had at a large number of children, including Ellen (Nellie) Prowse 1854-1944, born at Geelong, Victoria. Nellie died a spinster without issue.

Prowse first moved to Yatala, South Australia (on the north east outskirts of Adelaide), where in 1850 he obtained the position as Clerk, Collector and Surveyor to the District Road Board of the Hundred of Yatala, but resigned this position in 1852. This may have been to try his luck on the Victorian gold fields, as he returned in 1855 and was appointed engineer for what had become the Shire of Yatala, but he appeared to develop a conflict with some of the councillors, who sacked him, but he was reinstated when he reapplied for his position.

== Architectural and surveying practice ==
Prowse formed a partnership with Edward Snell in May 1854 after Snell's former partner, Frederick Kawerau decided to return to Germany. the partnership was dissolved in 1855.

His extensive architectural practice in Geelong is recorded in the Geelong Advertiser, including: listing as architect for Ingleby and called tenders for erection of dwelling (Raith) at Herne Hill (18 September 1854); tenders called by Snell & Prowse for erection of a store, Victoria Terrace for George Armytage (which became Dennys' store later) (5 May 1855); tenders for the erection of a 3-storey house at the corner of Yarra and Corio Streets (13 July 1855); erecting a new building near Moorabool Pier (27 July 1857); tenders for "Hermitage" (4 May 1858); called tenders for a new store Lt. Malop Street (23 April 1861); and called for tenders for brick additions, Christ Church School (20 June 1861).

The architecture practice was evidently booming in the height of the gold rushes, causing Prowse to advertise for a trainee architect in 1856.

Prowse was appointed town surveyor in Geelong, but was dismissed in 1860, in what appears to be a personal feud with some councillors. A vote in council reinstated him when he reapplied for the position.

Prowse investigated the railway accident in 1857, with John Millar, Engineer-ln-Chief to the Geelong Water Commission, which was caused when two trains collided near Little River. He also lectured at the Geelong Mechanics Institute on architectural subjects. Edward Prowse was engineer on the Corio District Roads Board up to his death in 1862, when he was succeeded by J. V. Bartlett.

Prowse died suddenly on 2 January 1862 of Apoplexy leaving "a widow with a large and helpless family to mourn his loss."

== Architectural works ==
- 'The Hermitage', for George Armytage Snr. 1859-60
- "The Heights", 140 Aphrasia Street, Newtown, 1855
- Werribee Park bluestone homestead 1857
- Melaleuka, 221-229 Matthews Road, Leopold, 1854 (Snell & Prowse)
- Frogmore, Hamilton Highway, Fyansford 1854
- "Duke of Wellington" Hotel 281 Pakington Street NEWTOWN, repairs and alterations 20 July 1859
- Ingleby House, two storey bluestone homestead of 1860 near Winchelsea established by George Armytage Jr. in 1842.
- "Raith", formerly "Malboona" and "Atlantis Heights" (Snell and Prowse) 1854
- 2 Skene Street Newtown
- St. Paul's Church of England, Latrobe Terrace, corner Brougham Street, Geelong (Snell and Kawerau 1853) (Snell and Prowse 1855)
- St Marks Anglican Church, Bellarine Hwy, Leopold, Victoria, 1859.
- St Thomas Church of England Cnr Barwon Terrace & Hesse Street, WINCHELSEA, 1860
- Christ Church, Moorabool Street, corner McKillop Street, Geelong addition by Snell, Kawarau and Prowse, removed earlier chancel, added transepts and a new chancel. completed c1856
