= Christ Church, Geelong =

Christ Church
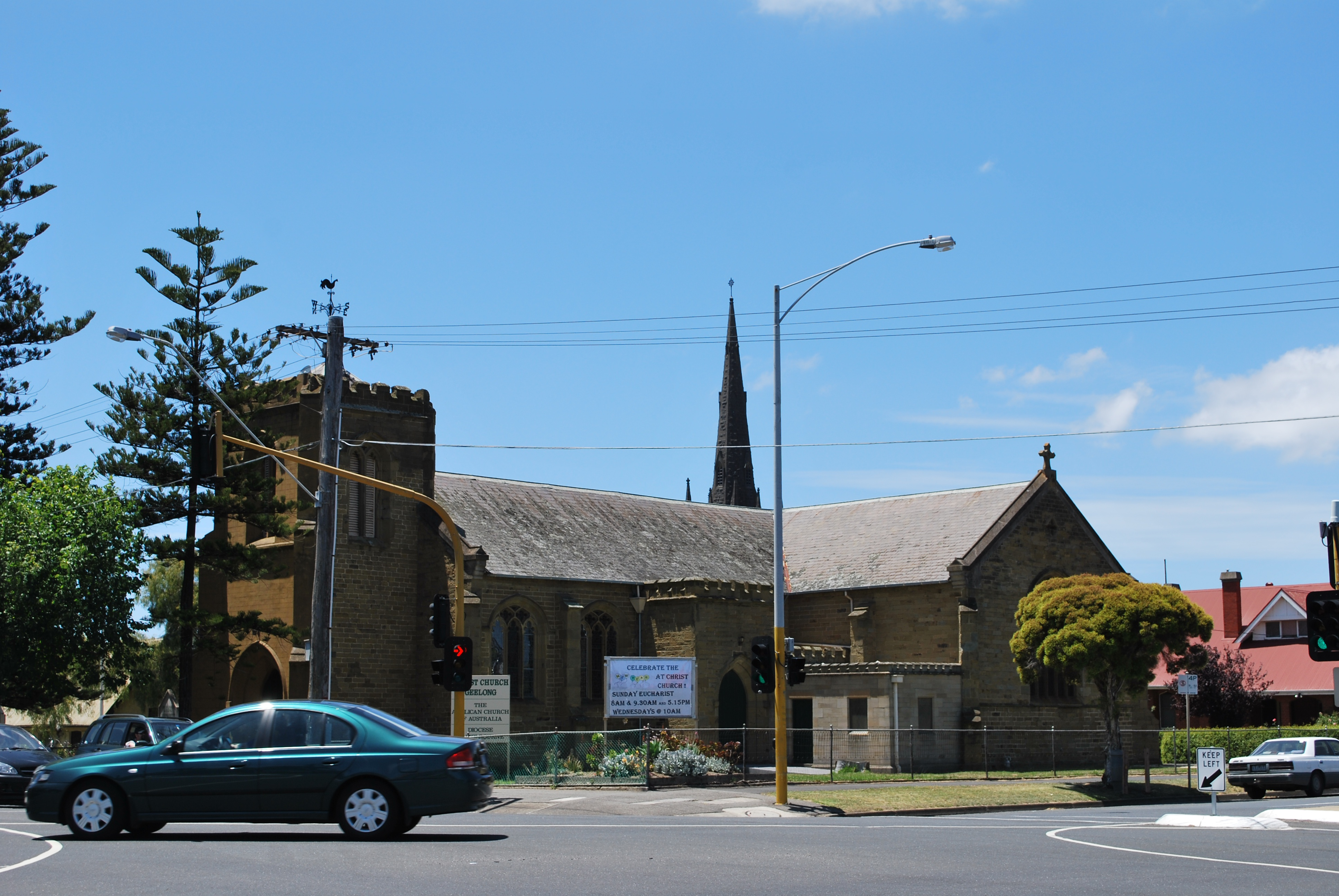

- Location in Victoria
- 38°09′12″S 144°21′31″E
- Location: 275 Moorabool Street, Geelong, Victoria
- Country: Australia
- Denomination: Anglican Church of Australia
- Website: christchurchgeelong.com.au

History
- Status: Church
- Founded: 7 October 1843
- Founder: William Grant Broughton
- Dedicated: 27 June 1847
- Consecrated: 25 October 1859

Architecture
- Functional status: Active
- Architects: Edmund Blacket (original); W. and A. Surplice; Snell, Kawarau and Prowse
- Architectural type: Perpendicular Gothic Revival
- Years built: 1843-1847

Specifications
- Materials: Barrabool sandstone; slate roofing

Administration
- Diocese: Melbourne

Victorian Heritage Register
- Official name: Christ Church
- Type: Registered place
- Designated: 9 October 1974
- Reference no.: H186
- Heritage overlay no.: HO7
- Category: Religion

The Christ Church is an Anglican church located in Geelong, Victoria, Australia. Designed by Edmund Blacket, the church is the oldest Anglican church in Victoria, in continuous use on its original site.

On 9 October 1974 the church was listed on the Victorian Heritage Register with the following statement of significance:

== History ==
The Geelong parish pre-dates the Diocese of Melbourne and was founded on 7 October 1843, when the Bishop of Australia, William Grant Broughton, laid the foundation stone at the north-east corner of the present nave. The church was opened and dedicated on 27 June 1847, and the enlarged church was consecrated on 25 October 1859. The church is the only one in Victoria designed by the colonial architect, Edmund Blacket. It was enlarged in 1855 by the addition of the transepts and sanctuary.

In 1941 Walter Charles Kernot, died. A memorial mural was commissioned from Christian Waller to "a good churchman" and was created in this church in 1942.

== See also ==
- List of Anglican churches in Melbourne
- St Paul's Anglican Church, Geelong
