= Allity =

Australian company

- Formerly: Lend Lease Retirement Living; Lend Lease Primelife; Babcock & Brown Communities; Primelife
- Type: Private
- Industry: Aged Care
- Founded: 1992
- Founder: Ted Sent
- Headquarters: Sydney, Australia
- Area served: New South Wales; Victoria; Queensland; South Australia
- Key people: Tomás Chubb, CEO
- Number of employees: 4,400 (2021)
- Parent: Bolton Clarke
- Website: www.allity.com.au

Allity is an Residential Aged Care Provider founded in March 2013 with 45 locations in Queensland, New South Wales, Victoria and South Australia. The homes offer all levels of permanent and respite care allowing for aging in place as well as providing secure dementia facilities.

== History ==
Allity was founded in 1992 by Ted Sent. It merged with another retirement village operator, Thomas Macdougall, in 1997 with the merged group renamed Primelife. In November 2003, the business was sold to Robert Champion de Crespigny and Ron Walker. By 1998, it had been listed on the Australian Securities Exchange.

In 2007, Primelife was purchased by Babcock & Brown and renamed Babcock & Brown Communities. In 2008, Lendlease acquired the business and renamed it Lend Lease Primelife in December of that year.

In March 2013, Lendlease sold the aged care part of its Primelife business to Archer Capital and it was rebranded with the name Allity while the independent living retirement villages remained in Lendlease's portfolio. In December 2021, Archer Capital sold the business to Bolton Clarke.

== Services ==
The homes offer all levels of permanent and respite care allowing for aging in place as well as providing secure dementia facilities.

Facilities range in size from 29 to 224 beds with an ongoing program for refurbishments and reviews across all locations to maintain the standards of both the physical environment of the home as well as the staff's ability to provide engaging activity programs for the residents.

In 2017, the Walkerville Allity facility collaborated with local year 10 students to allow students to speak to residents and write their memoirs. The program was expanded to all states in the same year.

Allity is participating in the roll out of a pain facial recognition app, which helps to staff to identify and manage the pain experienced by people living with dementia, who may be unable to verbalize their discomfort.

Allity is partnering with the developers of a clinical pharmacy service that uses a multidisciplinary health care team, patient consultations and DNA testing to create individualized medication plans for residents.

Allity is a significant residential aged care provider in Australia.

== See also ==
- Elderly care
- Aging in place
- Respite care
- Dementia
