= Frederick Kawerau =

- Born: 1 October 1817; Boleslawiec
- Died: 1 January 1876 (aged 58); Germany
- Education: Royal Academy in Berlin
- Engineering career
- Discipline: architect
- Practice name: Snell & Kawerau
- Projects: Kew Asylum 1864

Frederick (German: Friedrich) Ferdinand Kawerau was a German-born architect and surveyor, who worked in Geelong, Victoria, Australia between about 1849 and 1854.

Kawerau was born on 1 October 1817 in Bolesławiec, in Lower Silesia, and was probably uncle of Gustav Kawerau. He studied in Berlin, and was appointed as surveyor from the Royal Academy in Berlin. He was married to Maria and for a time lived in Hamburg.

== Migration to Australia ==
Kawerau and his wife arrived in Melbourne in 1849 on the Dockenhuden together with his brother Carl Theodor (1822-1904) and his wife Mary (she was 21 years old in 1849.

He purchased land in the German settlement of Westgarthtown in 1850, and was naturalized on 15 May 1850. Shortly after, he sold up and tried his luck on the goldfields. He then moved to Geelong where he established an office in Ryrie Street, Geelong, from where he successfully applied for at least four successful tenders in the 1850s.

== Partnership with Edward Snell ==
Kawerau formed a partnership with Edward Snell on 1 January 1853, with whom he undertook a number of projects in Geelong, including the Little River station and goods shed. In the boom years of 1853–54, he and Snell applied for at least another forty-four tenders. Among their joint work were the Geelong Railway Station, "Hawthorne" in Skene Street, a schoolmaster's house on the north-west corner of Myer and Gheringhap Streets, and the Terminus Hotel, Geelong (originally the Golden Point Hotel). Although the partnership had prospered for a time, it was dissolved in the 1854, perhaps because Kawerau felt that the downturn in the colony would reduce further prospects. (Snell went on to partner with another architect, his friend Edward Prowse).

== Later career ==
Ill-health saw Kawerau to decide to return to Europe in mid-1854. However, plans to leave the colony were abandoned, in part because he could not get a hotel licence for his enlarged house and he had to take in boarders. The house was in Skene Street, Geelong, and later became the Hotel Garni (since demolished) which was described as "a beautiful little Swiss cottage". It is also possible that Kawerau did return to Germany briefly, but went back to Australia in 1856.

Kawerau went on to become a draughtsman, and then senior architect, with the Victorian Public Works Department (PWD), and was architect and clerk of works for improvements at the Yarra Bend Asylum. He was also a witness in the Bowie versus Watson libel case, in which Dr Robert Bowie brought an action against The Argus newspaper in 1862. His major work from this time was the Kew Lunatic Asylum, for the PWD built in 1864–1871, to house the growing number of "lunatics", "inebriates", and "idiots" in the Colony of Victoria. However, reports of inferior works on the foundations led to an investigation, which saw Kawerau resign his position in the PWD.

In 1869 he returned to Germany, possibly without his wife Maria. and in January 1870 he was in Berlin, being made Australian consul in Berlin in 1875. He was last listed at the Berlin address in 1876.

Kawerau died in about 1876, possibly in Berlin.

== Architectural works ==
- John Day House 117 Yarra Street
- House in Skene Street Geelong, later Hotel Garni
- Geelong Railway Station
- Hawthorne Skene Street Geelong
- St Giles Church and Free Church School 72-80 Gheringhap Street Geelong
- School master's house Myer and Gheringhap Streets,
- Christ Church, Moorabool Street, enlarged 1855 Snell, Kawerau and Prowse
- Alterations to St Pauls Church of England, 175 Latrobe Terrace, Geelong 1853, Snell and Kawerau
- Terminus Hotel, Geelong (originally the Golden Point Hotel).
- Kew Lunatic Asylum 1864–1872 in Kew, with George W. Vivian
- Maldon courthouse
- Knowle House in Geelong in 1853
- Plan of the new plant and almshouse from 1854 to Barmbeck (Th / B )
- Lutheran Church of Melbourne (22-36 Parliament Place And 65-75 Cathedral Place East Melbourne, 1864
- New school house in Westgarthtown 1865
- Metropolitan Lunatic Asylum (later known as the Yarra Bend Lunatic Asylum Infirmary), pillars and entry gates and ha-ha wall (designed by F.Kawerau under the supervision of the Public Works Department Inspector General, William Wardell)
