= Edward Snell (engineer) =

Australian civil engineer

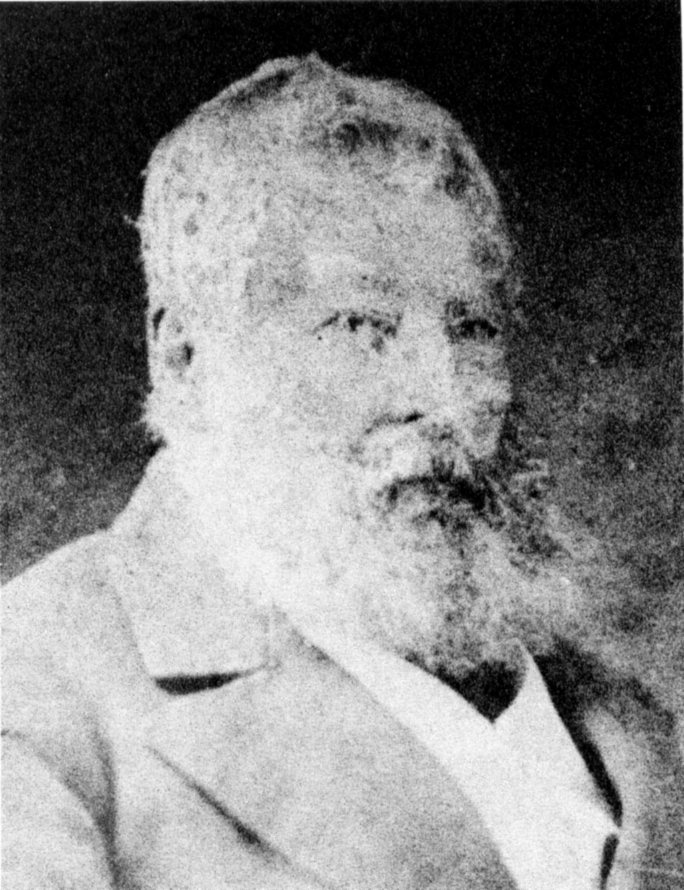
- Edward Snell in his later years
- Born: 27 November 1820; Barnstaple, Devon
- Died: 13 March 1880 (aged 59); Saltash, Cornwall
- Spouse: Charlotte Elizabeth Bayley (married Geelong 23 June 1853)
- Children: Emily Charlotte, born March 1854, Little Scotland, Geelong, Victoria; died 10 April 1854, Newtown, Geelong; buried Eastern Cemetery, Geelong; George Stothert SNELL, born 11 July 1855, Newtown, Geelong; baptised 2 September 1855, St Paul's Church of England, Geelong; Edward Lisle SNELL, born 29 November 1856, Newtown, Geelong; baptised 30 December 1856, St Paul's Church of England, Geelong; Henry Bayley SNELL, born December quarter 1858, Richmond, Yorkshire, England; Arthur Bartrum SNELL, born March quarter 1860, Saltash, Cornwall, England; Charles Scott SNELL, born September quarter 1862, Saltash, Cornwall, England; Alfred Cannan SNELL, born December quarter 1863, Saltash, Cornwall, England; Kate Emily SNELL, born 3 May 1865, Saltash, Cornwall, England; married Harold William READ, 1893, St Germans, Cornwall; Frederick Allibon SNELL, born March quarter 1868, Saltash, Cornwall, England;.
- Parent(s): Edward Snell and Elizabeth, née Stothert
- Engineering career
- Discipline: civil engineer
- Practice name: Snell & Kawerau; Snell and Prowse
- Projects: Geelong Melbourne railway line Victoria

Edward Snell (1820–1880) was a diarist, artist, civil engineer and surveyor, responsible for the design of the Geelong – Melbourne Railway for the Geelong and Melbourne Railway Company.

== Early life ==
Snell was born 27 November 1820, in Barnstaple, Devon, grandson of William Snell, a serge manufacturer of Crediton, Devon and the son of Edward Snell, a silversmith, jeweler, watch and clockmaker in High Street Barnstable, and Elizabeth, née Stothert.

Snell was the eldest of four children, having three sisters, Rose Emily (known as Emily), Emma and Elizabeth (known as Lizzie). His father died in 1827 at age 33, when Snell was only aged six, leaving their mother to raise them in financial difficulty despite the £1500 realized from the sale of the family business, High Street shop and house above it. Snell's maternal grandfather, Abel Stothert, was a cutler from Shaftesbury, whose brother was George Stothert, who established the Stothert ironmongery business in Bath around 1785, and his son George junior (1786-1858) who established the Horse Street Foundry in 1815, which subsequently grew into the important British engineering firm Stothert & Pitt. George Stothert played an important role in encouraging and helping his young cousin Edward Snell in his engineering career.

At the age of 14 he was apprenticed as an engineer and millwright to the Stothert's Bath foundry in the renamed Newark Street under George's younger half-brother Henry Stothert, completing his indenture on 16 March 1842. Most of his work was on projects around Bath, but sometimes extending as far as Newbury. Henry arranged for him to take up a position at the Avonside Ironworks in Bristol in May 1842, which had been established by Henry in 1837. He was not happy here, however, and gave notice after just three weeks, complaining of the low wages (20 shillings per week) and the tyrannical regime in the workshop.

Despite the resulting animosity from both Henry and George Stothert, George used his influence with the Locomotive superintendent Daniel Gooch to gain a position for Snell at the Great Western Railway Company Swindon workshops on 28 February 1843. Here he had the position of head draughtsman and then rose to deputy works manager. He stayed at the GWR in Swindon for six years apart from a short stint in 1844 at Penn's marine engineering works in Greenwich.

== Migration to Australia ==
A reduction in wages brought about by the post railway mania crash of 1848-9, caused him to decide to emigrate to Australia at the age of 29 with his friend Edward Prowse, having considered America. He arrived in Adelaide on the Bolton on 29 November 1849, recording in his diary: When I was 21 I calculated on making a small fortune by the time I was 30 but have made little headway in that line as yet. Snell spent some time in South Australia surveying and painting, spending three months on the Yorke Peninsula in 1850, then around Lake Alexandrina at the Murray River mouth. He produced a Plan for the Grand Junction Canal between Adelaide and the North Arm in August 1851.

== Gold digging and family ==
On 12 March 1852 he arrived at the Castlemaine diggings where he amassed £341 worth of gold in five months. Snell married Charlotte Elizabeth Bayley in Geelong on 23 June 1853, and the pair had 9 children, the first of whom Emily Charlotte died as an infant, but the other eight survived to adulthood.

== Railway work ==
It was Snell's work as engineer for the Geelong and Melbourne Railway Company, from 1853 until he resigned in October 1857, that established his fortune, for which he had been paid more than £17,000. His designs included a substantial terminal station and workshops at Geelong (which were only partly realised).

However, his railway work was not without controversy as he was criticised for the inadequacy of the engineering, with light timber bridges requiring extra maintenance and having a short life span, and the decision to build only a single track leading to slow and infrequent trains, and travelers between Melbourne and Geelong continued to prefer the bay steamers across Port Phillip Bay leading to diminished profits for the company. Snell gave evidence at a number of railway commission enquiries, defending his approach as necessary to complete the work in time, with the expectation that the engineering works would be upgraded as traffic and revenue increased. In reply to the presentation and testimony given to him by the Company in March 1858, he again highlighted the problems of building "a new undertaking, in a new country, and surrounded by innumerable difficulties."

The railway also had the misfortune of a fatal accident on its first run. The company's superintendent – and a friend of Snell's – was struck when leaning out of the train's engine as it approached a tunnel. An inquiry cleared the company of any negligence.

== Private practice ==
Snell also undertook private work as a surveyor and engineer. He formed a partnership with Frederick (German Friedrich) Ferdinand Kawerau on 1 January 1853, which prospered for a time, but was dissolved in the 1854, and later a partnership with Edward Prowse, which was dissolved in 1855, both of whom became prominent architects in Geelong.

Snell was an avid reader and self educator, joining the Adelaide and Geelong Mechanics Institutes; he became a member of the Geelong Society of Architects, Engineers and Surveyors; and the Philosophical Institute of Victoria in 1857 (later the Royal Society of Victoria)

== Later life ==
Snell returned to England in 1858 with his family on the Norfolk, to a life of retirement, having amassed the fortune that was his intention, and secured a considerable income of around £300 per annum. In retirement he undertook his own reading and invented a 'stockless' ship's anchor. In the 1870s he converted to spiritualism, gaining some notoriety in Bath.

Edward Snell died on 15 March 1880 at his residence, Culver Park, Saltash, Cornwall.

== Artistic works ==
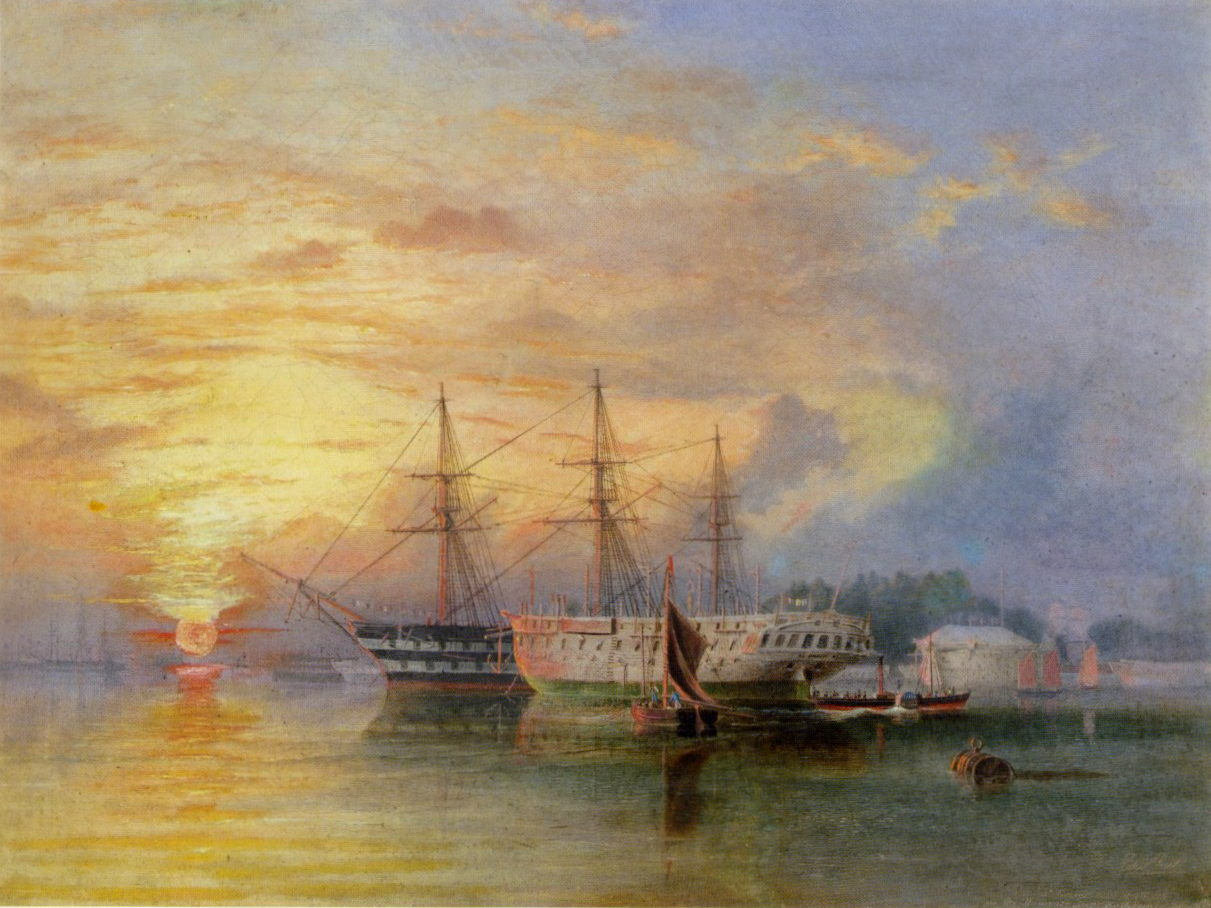
HMS St George and Arethusa on the Hamoaze near Bull Point

While the illustrations in his diaries and engineering drawings constitute his primary artistic output, his sketches, water colours and oil paintings form a moderate compendium of works of some note. Examples Include:

- HMS 'St George' and 'Arethusa' on the Hamoaze near Bull Point.
- The "Frolic" crossing Yorke's Peninsula, 14 June 1850, watercolour.
- Prospect of Swindon Railway Works and Village, Wiltshire Two watercolours of the new locomotive works and railway village in Swindon 1849.
- Geelong and Melbourne Railway Teminus, colour lithograph Quarrill & Co. August 1854.
- Williamstown Hobson's Bay, 1854 lithographed R. Quarrill & Co., [Melbourne] 1854.
- Kangaroo Hunting Yorkes (sic) Peninsula, watercolour, 18 August 1850.

Edward Snell's diary is a frank account of his time in Australia was not written for publication and has a frank, intimate and irreverent flavour. It is illustrated profusely with detailed and humorous watercolours and sketches. Snell's diary is one of three State Library Victoria goldfields records listed in the Australian Register of the Memory of the World.
