= Edith Latham Kernot =

Australian community worker

- Born: Edith Latham Hobday; 4 December 1877; Geelong, Victoria, Australia
- Died: 19 October 1967 (aged 89); Geelong, Victoria, Australia
- Known for: community work
- Spouse: Walter Charles Kernot
- Children: three

Edith Latham Kernot MBE (4 December 1877 – 19 October 1967) was an Australian community worker in Geelong. She supported the District nurses, the local Red Cross and Geelong Hospital. She was vice-president of Geelong Hospital and she sat on the Charities Board of Victoria.

== Life ==
Kernot was born in Geelong in 1877. She had an elder sibling and six younger ones who survived childhood. She showed an early talent for the violin and she would travel each week for lessons. She gave a performance as a teenager for the Ladies Benevolent Society and throughout her life she own and played her Duke violin. Her husband was Walter Charles Kernot who was a chemist. His uncle had founded a stationery / chemist business.

She supported the District Nursing Society and she became its vice President. She was a founding member of the local Australian Red Cross Society and during her fifty years of membership she was president for three years. She joined the Charities Board of Victoria in 1933 and served for fifteen years. There were fourteen members of the board and it was their task to decide how to channel "charitable relief to diseased, infirm, incurable, poor or destitute persons." Before she left in 1948 she was its president for three years.

In 1941 her similarly public spirited husband, Walter Charles Kernot, died. A memorial mural was commissioned from Christian Waller to "a good churchman". It was created in Christ Church, Geelong in 1942.

She was vice-president of Geelong and District Hospital and in 1958 she became a Member of The Most Excellent Order of the British Empire in the New Year Honours for her public service. Kernot died in her home city of Geelong in 1967.

== Private life ==
She had three children including the golfer Edith Betty Kernot who became the Australian Ladies Golf champion. Her other daughter, May Latham married in 1936.
