= International Towers =

Buildings in New South Wales, Australia

Coordinates: 33°51′46.56″S 151°12′5.97″E

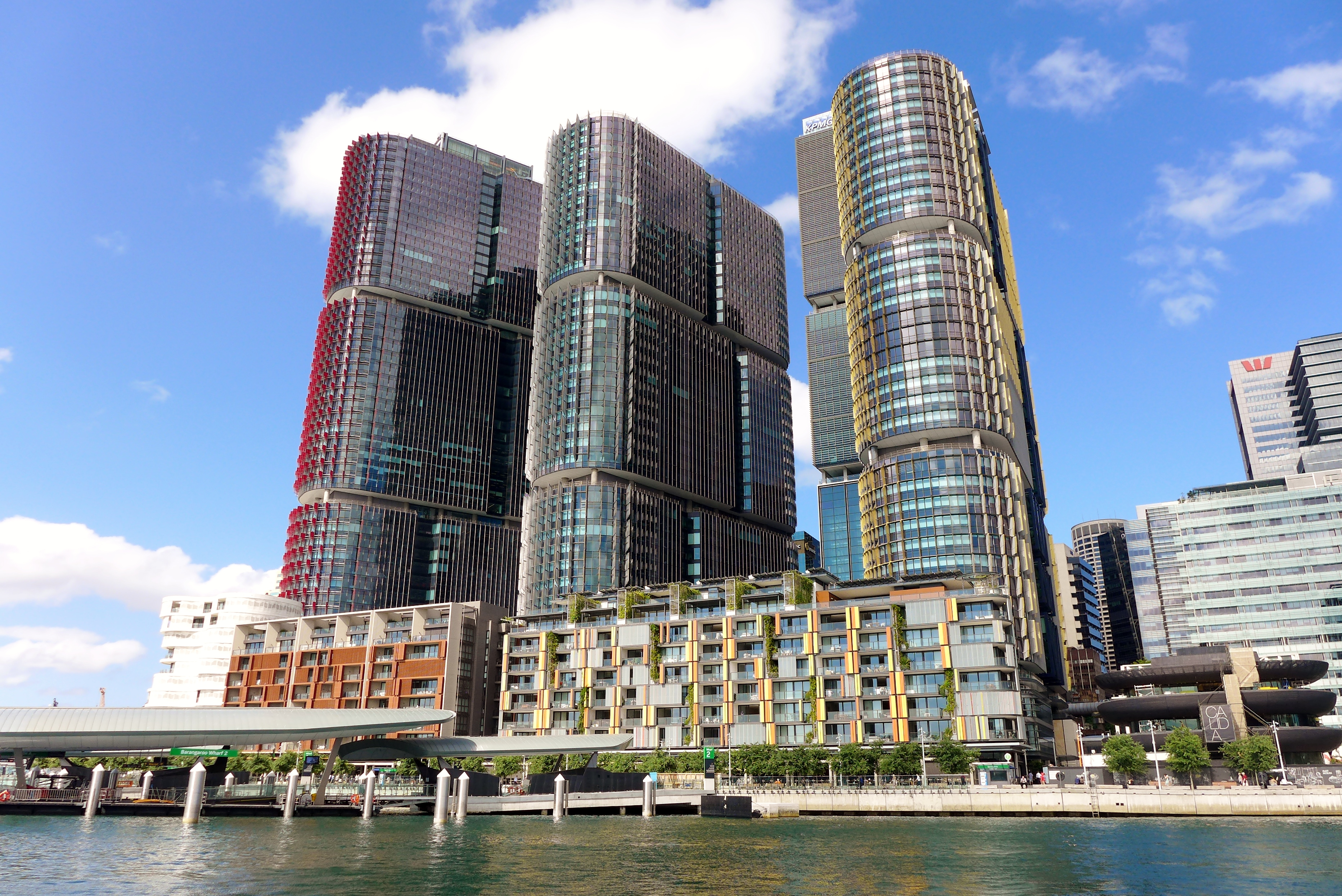
- Alternative names: Tower C3, C4, C5

General information
- Status: Completed
- Type: Commercial
- Location: Sydney, New South Wales, Australia
- Construction started: July 2013
- Completed: 8 December 2016; 9 years ago
- Owner: Lendlease (50%); CPP Investments (50%)

Height
- Roof: International Tower 1 : 217 m (712 ft); International Tower 2 : 178 m (584 ft); International Tower 3 : 168 m (551 ft)

Technical details
- Floor area: 283,900 m^{2} (3,056,000 sq ft) (in 3 towers)

Design and construction
- Architects: Richard Rogers and Ivan Harbour
- Architecture firm: Rogers Stirk Harbour + Partners
- Developer: Lendlease
- Structural engineer: Arup Group
- Main contractor: Lendlease

The International Towers is a commercial skyscraper complex in the Sydney central business district, in the Barangaroo area. The complex comprises three main office towers; Tower 1 at 217 metres (712 feet), Tower 2 at 178 metres (584 feet), and Tower 3 at 168 metres (551 feet). Construction on the towers began in 2013 before completion in mid 2016. The complex was built as part of a major urban redevelopment of Barangaroo, forming part of the core commercial, residential, retail and leisure development at Barangaroo South. More than 50 per cent of the Barangaroo South precinct (7.6 hectares) is accessible to the public. The development delivered 283,900 m^{2} of commercial office space.

The three office skyscrapers, individually known as International Towers 1, 2 and 3, were designed by Rogers Stirk Harbour + Partners.

== Construction ==
The tallest tower, known as Tower 1 is a 217m commercial building comprising 49 floors. It was completed in mid 2016. PwC signed as the anchor tenant and HSBC and Marsh & McLennan Companies also signed a tenancy agreement. The Syrian Opposition representation office in Australia is located in this building.

Tower 2 is a 178m high-rise comprising 43 floors. Two major tenants of the central tower of the three buildings are Westpac and corporate law firm, Gilbert + Tobin who occupy more than 80% of the tower's space. Tower 2 was the first tower to start construction from July 2013 and was completed in June 2015, with Westpac employees starting to move into the precinct from August 2015.

Tower 3 is a 168m tall building comprising 39 floors. Main tenant KPMG signed a 14-year lease to occupy the top 15 floors from January 2016 and Lendlease also made Tower 3 its Sydney headquarters from July 2016. Tower 3 was topped out in November 2015 and was completed in mid 2016. Tower 3 has a new medical centre, MyHealth Barangaroo Medical Centre, on the 1st floor at 300 Barangaroo Avenue. Also on the 1st floor is National Dental Care. Together these will provide a convenient medical and dental service for the growing community.
