= Bolton Clarke =

Australian care provider

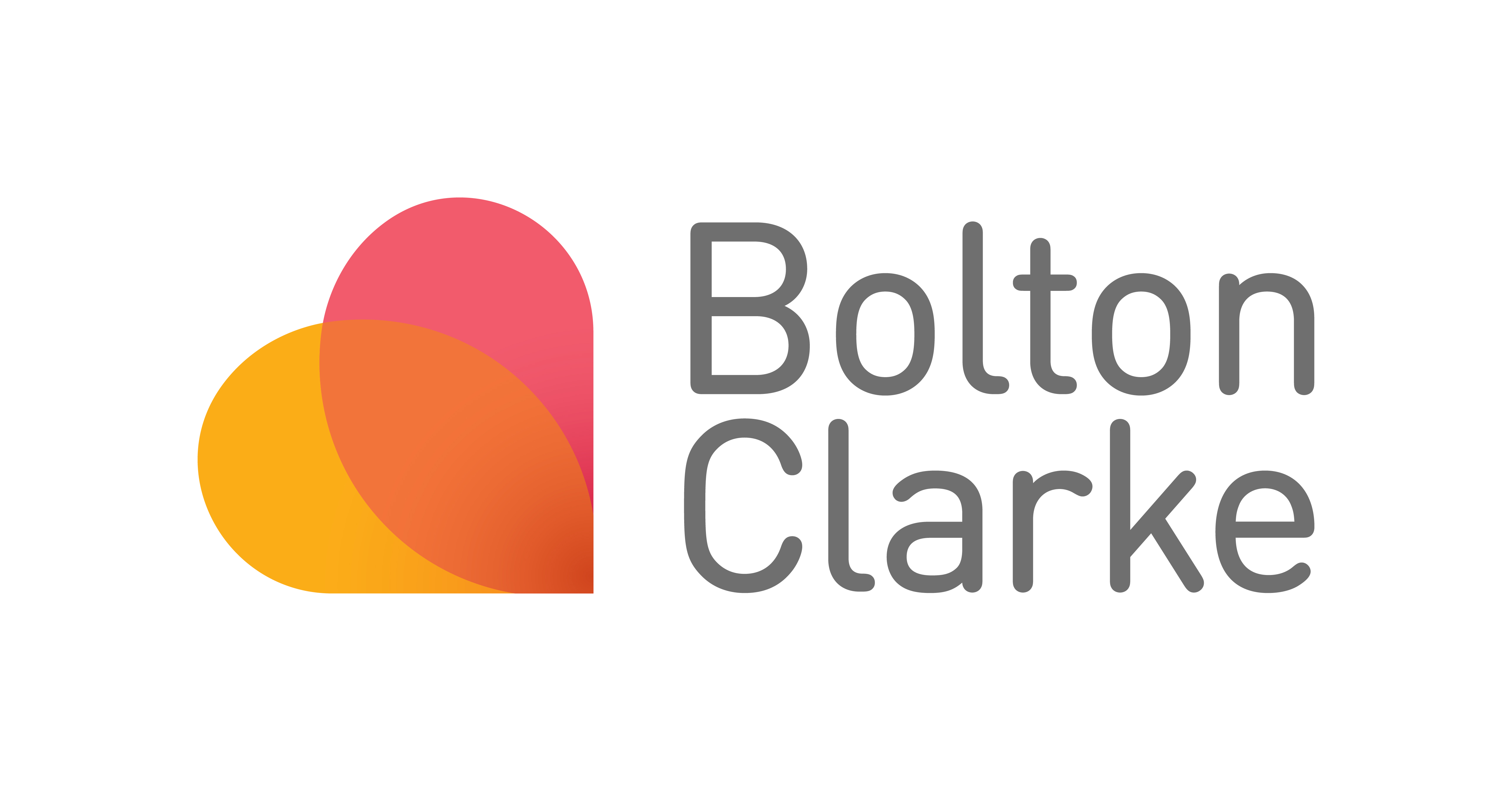
- Type: Charity
- Industry: Nursing, Health care, Education and Training
- Founded: 1885
- Headquarters: Brisbane, Australia
- Subsidiaries: Allity
- Website: www.boltonclarke.com.au

Bolton Clarke is an Australian-based provider of independent living services through at-home care, retirement living and residential aged care. It had its beginnings with the establishment of the Melbourne District Nursing Society in 1885, which later became known as the Royal District Nursing Service (RDNS). RDNS merged with RSL Care in 2015, and in 2017 the organisation adopted its current name to honour two pioneers of Australian healthcare, William Kinsey Bolton and Janet Clarke.

== History ==
The Melbourne District Nursing Society began in 1885 with a single nurse visiting the homes of the sick and poor to provide compassionate nursing care. With no other nursing service of its kind, support for the newfound form of healthcare grew. As a result, by 1892, more staff were employed to cope with demands and the organisation implemented its own midwifery service. In 1898, a meeting was held in the local town hall and it was decided to start a Collingwood branch of the Melbourne District Nursing Society.

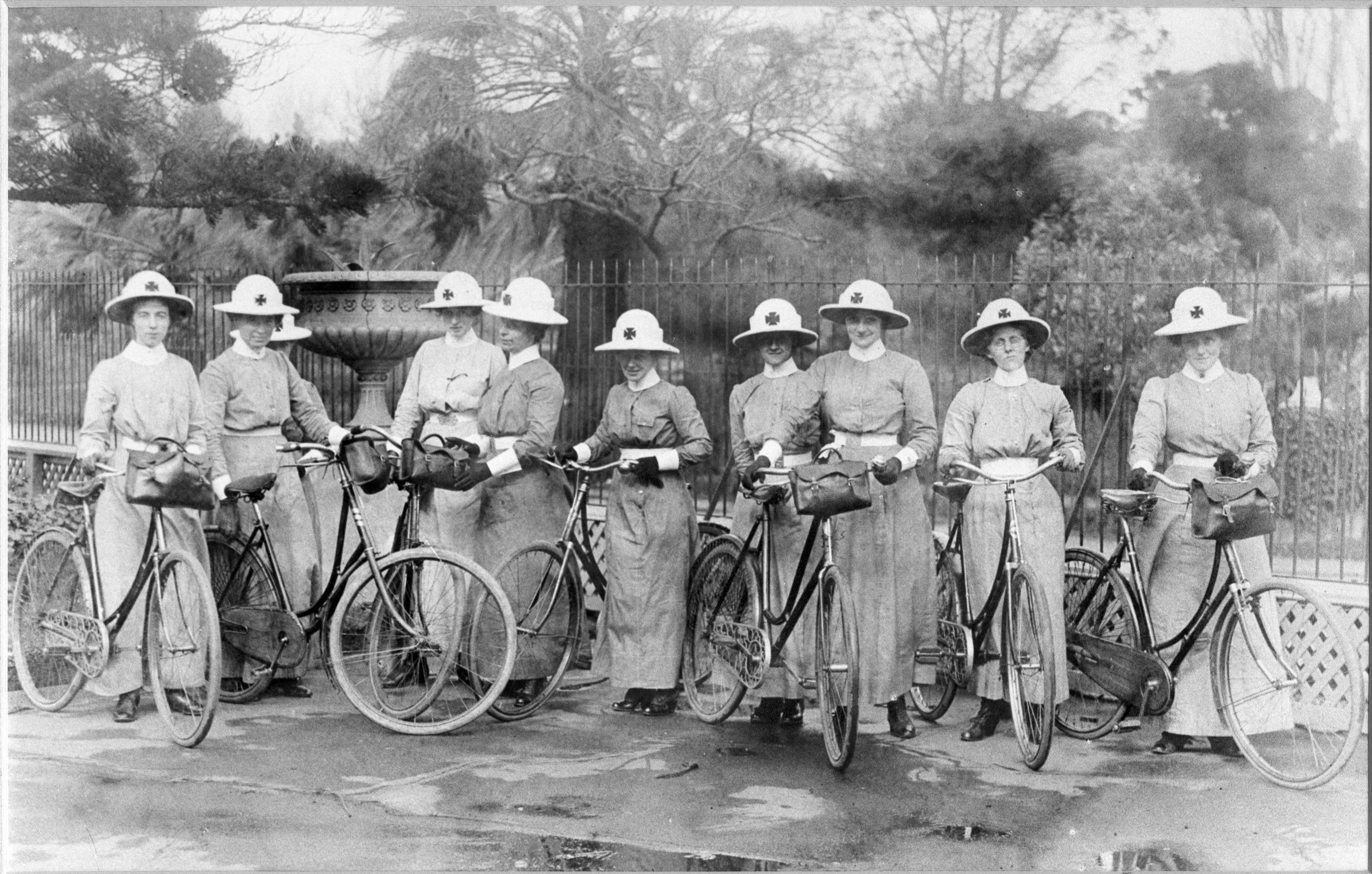
First District Nurses in Melbourne

By 1906, the organisation had extended its healthcare service to the outer suburbs of Melbourne and employed the use of bicycles to efficiently travel around the city. This form of transportation enabled district nurses to reach more clients, more quickly over a wider geographical area.

The Great War saw the onset of 1919 influenza epidemic and placed increasing pressure on the organisation to service more and more clientele. To expedite the number of clients treated, the organisation invested in its first motor car, which would later become an integral identifier of the modern-day home care services.

Following the opening of an aftercare hospital in 1926, the organisation extended its care to mothers and infants by opening Melbourne's first "Well baby clinic", which later became a motivating factor in the development of Victoria's first family planning clinic. Like the Great War, World War II increased the demand for services and the organisation's type of clientele soon became anyone who had a genuine nursing need regardless of age, condition or circumstance. With the expanded need for services, the organisation decentralised its business by opening its first suburban centre in Camberwell.

In the 1980s, RDNS began to provide post-acute care treatments for HIV/AIDS, cystic fibrosis and other chronic treatments, care which had previously been confined to hospitals but could now be administered in the home. The HIV Program became integrated with the Victorian AIDS Council's (VAC) HIV Services in the early 1990s, and this relationship has endured for 25 years. Volunteers and paid workers through VAC provide practical assistance and social support and the RDNS nurses provide care coordination and professional nursing care for people living with HIV in the community. The RDNS HIV Program joined with the RDNS Homeless Person's Program in 2015.

RSL Care grew from Queensland War Veterans Homes, which opened its first home for veterans in Brisbane, Queensland in 1938. It brought with it a strong asset base in Queensland and New South Wales and significant experience in the operation of residential communities.

Experienced health and aged care CEO Stephen Muggleton had begun developing a proposal to merge RSL Care and RDNS in 2012, during a four-year term as CEO of RDNS. When he took on the leadership role at RSL Care in 2015 he put the merger proposal to both boards. In 2015, the two boards independently concluded there were significant benefits in coming together to deliver more health and wellbeing solutions across a broader area. The decision came during a period of major legislative changes in Australia's aged care sector in line with Australia's Aged Care Roadmap and the shift to consumer-directed care.

The merged organisation came together under the new brand name, Bolton Clarke, in August 2017. The RSL Care, RDNS, RDNS HomeCare and Rally HomeCare (South Australia) entities were brought under the Bolton Clarke brand, in a move designed to unite the broader service offerings of the combined group of companies under one brand name and resolve the geographical limitations that had restricted use of the original brand names outside their home states. The name pays tribute to two key pioneers whose values helped shape the organisation:

Lady Janet Clarke (1851-1909), a well-known philanthropist, became president of the Melbourne District Nursing Society (later RDNS) in 1889 and remained a driving force in the organisation for more than 20 years. Community worker Edith Latham Kernot supported the society for twenty years serving as a vice-President.

• Lieutenant Colonel William Kinsey Bolton (1860-1941) was a returned serviceman and Gallipoli veteran who in 1916 became the first President of the Returned Sailors' and Soldiers' League (forerunner of the Returned & Services League of Australia), Australia's major organisation supporting current and former members of the Defence Forces.

== Service today ==
Since joining together, Bolton Clarke has expanded its service offering and its footprint to become Australia's largest independent, not-for-profit aged care provider. In 2021, Acacia Living Group in Western Australia joined Bolton Clarke Group, bringing residential aged care, respite, retirement living and home care capability in that state. In 2022, the organisation acquired Allity aged care with its 70 residential homes across Victoria, New South Wales, Queensland and South Australia, and in 2023 McKenzie Aged Care joined the Group with a further 17 communities.

The organisation provides a 24-hour home nursing and home care service to people throughout Australia and New Zealand. Every day their exceptional teams support people to live independently at home and across its 87 residential homes and 42 retirement villages. Specialist services include nursing and clinical care, dementia support, respite care, palliative care, a Homeless Persons Program and HIV team. The Bolton Clarke Research Institute has a reputation for high impact community health and aged care research to help people live and age well. The group works with 19 national and international corporate and research partnerships with a focus on improving knowledge around health and ageing.
