= 2022 in golf =

This article summarizes the highlights of professional and amateur golf in the year 2022.

== Men's professional golf ==
=== Major championships ===
- 7–10 April: Masters Tournament – Scottie Scheffler won three strokes ahead of Rory McIlroy. It was his first Masters victory, and his first major championship victory. He is one of three players who had won the Masters at 25 years of age or younger over the last 40 years.
- 19–22 May: PGA Championship – Justin Thomas won in a 3-hole playoff against Will Zalatoris. It was his second PGA Championship victory, and his second overall major championship victory. Out of 22 players who have won multiple PGA Championships, Thomas was only the fifth player to win the event twice before turning 30.
- 16–19 June: U.S. Open – Matt Fitzpatrick won by one shot over Scottie Scheffler and Will Zalatoris. It was his first major victory and first overall victory in his PGA Tour career. Fitzpatrick is the 13th golfer to win both the U.S. Amateur and the U.S. Open in his career, and only the second golfer to win both on the same course.
- 14–17 July: The Open Championship – Cameron Smith won by one stroke over Cameron Young. It was his first Open Championship victory, and his first major victory. Smith was only the third golfer to score 64 or lower in the final round of the event.

=== World Golf Championships ===
- 23–27 March: WGC-Dell Technologies Match Play – Scottie Scheffler defeated Kevin Kisner, 4 and 3, in the championship match. It was his first ever WGC victory, and this win moved him to World Number One in the Official World Golf Ranking.
- 27–30 October: WGC-HSBC Champions – Cancelled

The WGC-Workday Championship and WGC-FedEx St. Jude Invitational both lost their designation as World Golf Championships after 2021.

=== FedEx Cup playoff events ===
- 11–14 August: FedEx St. Jude Championship – Will Zalatoris defeated Sepp Straka in a 3-hole playoff. It was his first PGA Tour win and first FedEx Cup playoff event victoryr.
- 18–21 August: BMW Championship – Patrick Cantlay won by one stroke over Scott Stallings. It was his second back-to-back win at the event and third FedEx Cup playoff event victory in his career. Cantlay became the first player to win the BMW Championship in consecutive years ever since the FedEx Cup began in 2007. No one else had accomplished this feat with any other playoff events.
- 25–28 August: Tour Championship – Rory McIlroy won by one stroke over Im Sung-jae and Scottie Scheffler. It was his sixth FedEx Cup playoff event victory, third FedEx Cup title, and third Tour Championship victory.

The Northern Trust was renamed the FedEx St. Jude Championship after the 2020–21 PGA Tour season.

=== Other leading PGA Tour events ===
- 10–13 March: The Players Championship – Cameron Smith won by one stroke over Anirban Lahiri. It was his first Players Championship victory.

For a complete list of PGA Tour results see 2021–22 PGA Tour.

=== Leading European Tour events ===
- 8–11 September: BMW PGA Championship – Shane Lowry won by 1 stroke over Rory McIlroy and Jon Rahm. It was his second European Tour Rolex Series victory and first BMW PGA Championship win.
- 17–20 November: DP World Tour Championship, Dubai – Jon Rahm won by 2 strokes over Alex Noren and Tyrrell Hatton. It was his third DP World Tour Championship win and ninth DP World Tour win.

For a complete list of European Tour results see 2022 European Tour.

=== Team events ===
- 22–25 September: Presidents Cup – The U.S. team won, 17 1/2–12 1/2, for the ninth straight time.

=== Tour leaders ===
- PGA Tour
  - FedEx Cup – (Northern Ireland) Rory McIlroy
  - Leading money winner – (United States) Scottie Scheffler (US$14,046,910) (record)
- European Tour – (Northern Ireland) Rory McIlroy (4,754 points)
- Japan Golf Tour – Kazuki Higa (¥181,598,825)
- Asian Tour
  - 2020–21–22 season – (South Korea) Tom Kim (US$507,553)
  - 2022 season – (United States) Sihwan Kim (US$627,458)
- PGA Tour of Australasia – 2021–22 season: (Australia) Jediah Morgan (A$190,409)
- Sunshine Tour – 2021–22 season: (South Africa) Shaun Norris (R 4,890,994)

=== Awards ===
- PGA Tour
  - PGA Player of the Year – (Australia) Cameron Smith
  - Player of the Year (Jack Nicklaus Trophy) – (United States) Scottie Scheffler
  - Vardon Trophy – (Northern Ireland) Rory McIlroy
  - Byron Nelson Award – (Northern Ireland) Rory McIlroy
  - Rookie of the Year (Arnold Palmer Award) – (United States) Cameron Young
  - Payne Stewart Award – (United States) Billy Andrade
- European Tour
  - Golfer of the Year – (Australia) Ryan Fox
  - Rookie of the Year – (South Africa) Thriston Lawrence
- Korn Ferry Tour
  - Player of the Year – (United States) Justin Suh

=== Results from other tours ===
- 2020–21–22 Asian Tour
- 2022 Asian Tour
- 2021–22 PGA Tour of Australasia
- 2022–23 PGA Tour of Australasia
- 2022 PGA Tour Canada
- 2022 Challenge Tour
- 2022 Japan Golf Tour
- 2022 PGA Tour Latinoamérica
- 2021–22 Sunshine Tour
- 2022–23 Sunshine Tour
- 2022 Korn Ferry Tour

=== Other happenings ===
- 1 January: Jon Rahm remains World Number 1 in the Official World Golf Ranking. He has stayed at this spot since July 2021.
- 28 March: Scottie Scheffler gains the top spot in the Official World Golf Ranking, obtaining it for the first time, after winning the 2022 WGC-Dell Technologies Match Play tournament.
- 24 October: Rory McIlroy takes the top spot from Scottie Scheffler after winning the CJ Cup tournament.

== Women's professional golf ==
=== LPGA majors ===
- 31 March – 3 April: Chevron Championship – Jennifer Kupcho won by two strokes over Jessica Korda. It was her first major victory and first overall win in her LPGA career. Kupcho is the seventh player to claim her first LPGA Tour title in the tournament.
- 2–5 June: U.S. Women's Open – Minjee Lee won by four strokes over Mina Harigae. It was her first U.S. Women's Open victory, and second overall major win in her LPGA career.
- 23–26 June: KPMG Women's PGA Championship – Chun In-gee won by one stroke over Minjee Lee. It was her third major win, and first KPMG Women's PGA Championship victory in her LPGA career. She became the third player from South Korea to win at least three majors.
- 21–24 July: The Evian Championship – Brooke Henderson won by one stroke over Sophie Schubert. It was her second major victory, and first Evian Championship win. Henderson is the first Canadian golfer, male or female, to win multiple major titles.
- 4–7 August: Women's British Open – Ashleigh Buhai defeated Chun In-gee in a playoff by one stroke. It was her first major win, and first overall win in her LPGA career. Buhai is the third South African golfer to win a Women's British Open at Muirfield.

=== Additional LPGA Tour events ===
- 17–20 November: CME Group Tour Championship – Lydia Ko won by two strokes over Leona Maguire. It was her second CME Group Tour Championship win.

For a complete list of LPGA Tour results, see 2022 LPGA Tour.
For a complete list of Ladies European Tour results see 2022 Ladies European Tour.

=== Money list leaders ===
- LPGA Tour – (New Zealand) Lydia Ko (US$4,364,403)
- Ladies European Tour – (Sweden) Linn Grant (3,625 points)
- LPGA of Japan Tour – Miyū Yamashita (¥235,020,967)
- LPGA of Korea Tour – (South Korea) Park Min-ji (₩1,477,921,143)
- WPGA Tour of Australasia – unpublished
- Epson Tour – (Sweden) Linnea Ström (US$119,190)

The Symetra Tour was renamed to the Epson Tour after the 2021 season.

=== Other tour results ===
- 2022 WPGA Tour of Australasia
- 2022 LPGA of Japan Tour
- 2022 LPGA of Korea Tour
- 2022 Epson Tour

=== Other happenings ===
- 1 January – Nelly Korda remains world number 1 in the Women's World Golf Rankings, continuing her lead from 2021.
- 31 January – Ko Jin-young gains the top spot in the world rankings.
- 31 October – Atthaya Thitikul displaced Ko Jin-young as world number 1.
- 14 November – Korda regains the top ranking after winning the Pelican Women's Championship.
- 28 November – Lydia Ko regained the number 1 world ranking for the first time since 2017.

== Senior men's professional golf ==
=== Senior majors ===
- 12–15 May: Regions Tradition – Steve Stricker won by 6 strokes over Pádraig Harrington. It was his fourth senior major victory, and second Regions Traditions win in his PGA Tour Champions career. This win was a wire-to-wire victory.
- 26–29 May: KitchenAid Senior PGA Championship – Steven Alker won by 3 strokes over Stephen Ames. It was his first senior major win, and first KitchenAid Senior PGA Championship win in his Champions career.
- 23–26 June: U.S. Senior Open – Pádraig Harrington won by 1 stroke over Steve Stricker. It was his first senior major win, and first overall victory in his Champions career. Harrington is the third straight player to win the U.S. Senior Open in his debut.
- 7–10 July: Bridgestone Senior Players Championship – Jerry Kelly won by 2 strokes over Steve Stricker. It was his second senior major victory, and second Bridgestone Senior Players Championship victory in his Champions career.
- 21–24 July: The Senior Open Championship – Darren Clarke won by 1 stroke over Pádraig Harrington. It was his first senior major victory, and first Senior Open Championship win.

=== Charles Schwab Cup playoff events ===
- 21–23 October: Dominion Charity Classic – Steven Alker won by 1 stroke over K. J. Choi. It was his first Charles Schwab Cup event win in his Champions career.
- 4–6 November: TimberTech Championship – Bernhard Langer won by 6 strokes over Thongchai Jaidee and Paul Goydos. It was his fourth Charles Schwab Cup playoff event victory and 44th PGA Tour Champions win.
- 10–13 November: Charles Schwab Cup Championship – Pádraig Harrington won by 7 strokes over Alex Čejka. It was his fourth PGA Tour Champions victory.

=== Full results ===
- 2022 PGA Tour Champions season
- 2022 European Senior Tour

== Senior women's professional golf ==
- 22–24 July: Senior LPGA Championship – Karrie Webb won by 4 strokes over Annika Sörenstam.
- 25–28 August: U.S. Senior Women's Open – Jill McGill won by 1 stroke over Leta Lindley.

== Amateur golf ==
- 20–23 January: Latin America Amateur Championship – Aaron Jarvis won by 1 stroke over Mateo Fernández de Oliveira, Vicente Marzilio, Fred Biondi, and Santiago de la Fuente.
- 20–25 May: NCAA Division I Women's Golf Championships – Rose Zhang (Stanford) took the individual title and the Cardinals captured their second team title.
- 27 May – 1 June: NCAA Division I Men's Golf Championships – Gordon Sargent (Vanderbilt) took the individual title and the Longhorns captured their fourth team title.
- 10–12 June: Curtis Cup – The United States team won, 15 1/2–4 1/2.
- 15–18 June: The Amateur Championship – Aldrich Potgieter defeated Sam Bairstow, 3 and 2, in the final.
- 22–25 June: The Women's Amateur Championship – Jess Baker of England defeated Louise Rydqvist of Sweden, 4 and 3, in the final.
- 22–25 June: European Amateur – Filippo Celli of Italy won by 1 stroke over Rasmus Neergaard-Petersen of Denmark.
- 20–23 July: European Ladies Amateur Championship – Savannah De Bock of Belgium won in a playoff against Charlotte Heath of England.
- 8–14 August: U.S. Women's Amateur – Saki Baba of Japan defeated Monet Chun of Canada, 11 and 9, in the final.
- 15–21 August: U.S. Amateur – Sam Bennett defeated Ben Carr, 1 up, in the final.
- 24–27 August: Espirito Santo Trophy – The Sweden team won for the third time, besting the United States team in a tiebreaker.
- 31 August – 3 September: Eisenhower Trophy – Italy won its first Eisenhower Trophy by one stroke over Sweden.
- 27–30 October: Asia-Pacific Amateur Championship – Harrison Crowe won by one stroke over Jin Bo.

== Deaths ==
- 9 January – Bob Shearer (born 1948), Australian professional golfer and course architect who had one win on the PGA Tour.
- 19 January – Bob Goalby (born 1929), American professional golfer who had 11 wins on the PGA Tour including one Masters Tournament victory.
- 24 January – Tomoo Ishii (born 1923), Japanese professional golfer.
- 28 January – Elis Svärd (born 1996), Swedish professional golfer who had one win on the Nordic Golf League.
- 13 February – Eduardo Romero (born 1954), Argentine professional golfer who won over 80 professional golf tournaments across 5 or more tours, and was mayor of Villa Allende from 2015 until his death.
- 19 February – Kyi Hla Han (born 1961), Burmese professional golfer who had one win in the Asian Tour and in the PGA Tour of Australasia. He served as executive chairman of the Asian Tour from 2006 until his death.
- 7 March – Ramón Báez Romano (born 1929), Dominican golfer, businessman, and politician.
- 15 March – Lu Liang-Huan (born 1936), Taiwanese golfer who had 8 victories on the Japan Golf Tour.
- 27 March – Joan Joyce (born 1940), American professional golfer who also played several other sports.
- 12 April – Shirley Spork (born 1927), American professional golfer and co-founder of the LPGA Tour.
- 14 April – Jack Newton (born 1950), Australian professional golfer who had 1 victory on the PGA Tour.
- 23 April – Sheila Vaughan (born 1942), English amateur golfer.
- 3 May – Bert Weaver (born 1932), American professional golfer who had 1 victory on the PGA Tour.
- 28 May – Mary Everard (born 1942), English amateur golfer.
- 31 May – Bart Bryant (born 1962), American professional golfer who had 3 victories on the PGA Tour including the Tour Championship.
- 16 June – Don Allen (born 1937–1938), American amateur golfer.
- 1 July – Angela Bonallack (born 1937), English amateur golfer.
- 4 July – Mac McLendon (born 1945), American professional golfer who had 4 victories on the PGA Tour.
- 6 July – Dale Douglass (born 1936), American professional golfer who had 3 victories on the PGA Tour and 11 wins including one senior major on the PGA Tour Champions.
- 9 July – Tommy Jacobs (born 1935), American professional golfer who had 4 victories on the PGA Tour.
- 19 August – David Marsh (born 1934), British amateur golfer. He served as the Chairman of Everton F.C. from 1991 to 1994.
- 20 August – Tom Weiskopf (born 1942), American professional golfer who had 16 victories including one major win on the PGA Tour.
- 21 September – Russell Weir (born 1951), Scottish golfer.
- 2 October – Shirley Englehorn (born 1940), American professional golfer who won 11 LPGA Tour tournaments, including one major.
- 9 October – Margie Masters (born 1934), Australian professional golfer who won one LPGA Tour tournament.
- 13 October – Peter Butler (born 1932), English professional golfer who won several tournaments in Europe.
- 4 November – Dow Finsterwald (born 1929), American professional golfer who had 11 victories on the PGA Tour, including one major.
- 23 December – Ed Updegraff (born 1922), American amateur golfer and urologist.
- 24 December – Kathy Whitworth (born 1939), American professional golfer who had 88 victories on the LPGA Tour.
- 31 December – Barry Lane (born 1960), English professional golfer who had 5 victories on the European Tour.

== Table of results ==
This table summarizes all the results referred to above in date order.

Dates	Tournament	Status or tour	Winner	Source
20–23 Jan	Latin America Amateur Championship	Amateur men's individual tournament	(Cayman Islands) Aaron Jarvis	
10–14 Mar (Note: Several rain delays were called during the first round, resulting in one extra day.)	The Players Championship	PGA Tour	(Australia) Cameron Smith	
23–27 Mar	WGC-Dell Technologies Match Play	World Golf Championships	(United States) Scottie Scheffler	
31 Mar – 3 Apr	Chevron Championship	LPGA major	(United States) Jennifer Kupcho	
7–10 Apr	Masters Tournament	Men's major	(United States) Scottie Scheffler	
12–15 May	Regions Tradition	Senior major	(United States) Steve Stricker	
19–22 May	PGA Championship	Men's major	(United States) Justin Thomas	
20–25 May	NCAA Division I Women's Golf Championships	U.S. college championship	Stanford / Rose Zhang	
26–29 May	Senior PGA Championship	Senior major	(New Zealand) Steven Alker	
27 May – 1 Jun	NCAA Division I Men's Golf Championships	U.S. college championship	Texas / Gordon Sargent	
2–5 Jun	U.S. Women's Open	LPGA major	(Australia) Minjee Lee	
10–12 Jun	Curtis Cup	Amateur women's team event	United States	
15–18 Jun	The Amateur Championship	Amateur men's individual tournament	(South Africa) Aldrich Potgieter	
16–19 Jun	U.S. Open	Men's major	(England) Matt Fitzpatrick	
22–25 Jun	European Amateur	Amateur men's individual tournament	(Italy) Filippo Celli	
22–25 Jun	Women's Amateur Championship	Amateur women's individual tournament	(England) Jess Baker	
23–26 Jun	U.S. Senior Open	Senior major	(Republic of Ireland) Pádraig Harrington	
23–26 Jun	Women's PGA Championship	LPGA major	(South Korea) Chun In-gee	
7–10 Jul	Senior Players Championship	Senior major	(United States) Jerry Kelly	
14–17 Jul	The Open Championship	Men's major	(Australia) Cameron Smith	
20–23 Jul	European Ladies Amateur	Amateur women's individual tournament	(Belgium) Savannah De Bock	
21–24 Jul	The Evian Championship	LPGA Tour and Ladies European Tour major	(Canada) Brooke Henderson	
21–24 Jul	The Senior Open Championship	Senior major	(Northern Ireland) Darren Clarke	
22–24 Jul	Senior LPGA Championship	Senior women's major	(Australia) Karrie Webb	
4–7 Aug	Women's British Open	LPGA Tour and Ladies European Tour major	(South Africa) Ashleigh Buhai	
8–14 Aug	U.S. Women's Amateur	Amateur women's individual tournament	(Japan) Saki Baba	
11–14 Aug	FedEx St. Jude Championship	PGA Tour FedEx Cup playoff	(United States) Will Zalatoris	
15–21 Aug	U.S. Amateur	Amateur men's individual tournament	(United States) Sam Bennett	
18–21 Aug	BMW Championship	PGA Tour FedEx Cup playoff	(United States) Patrick Cantlay	
24–27 Aug	Espirito Santo Trophy	Women's amateur team event	Sweden	
25–28 Aug	U.S. Senior Women's Open	Senior women's major	(United States) Jill McGill	
25–28 Aug	Tour Championship	PGA Tour FedEx Cup playoff	(Northern Ireland) Rory McIlroy	
31 Aug – 3 Sep	Eisenhower Trophy	Men's amateur team event	Italy	
8–11 Sep	BMW PGA Championship	European Tour	(Republic of Ireland) Shane Lowry	
22–25 Sep	Presidents Cup	International team vs. United States team men's professional team event	United States	
21–23 Oct	Dominion Charity Classic	PGA Tour Champions Charles Schwab Cup playoff	(New Zealand) Steven Alker	
~~27–30 Oct~~	WGC-HSBC Champions	World Golf Championships	Cancelled (Note: Cancelled due to COVID-19.)	
27–30 Oct	Asia-Pacific Amateur Championship	Amateur men's individual tournament	(Australia) Harrison Crowe	
4–6 Nov	TimberTech Championship	PGA Tour Champions Charles Schwab Cup playoff	(Germany) Bernhard Langer	
10–13 Nov	Charles Schwab Cup Championship	PGA Tour Champions Charles Schwab Cup playoff	(Republic of Ireland) Pádraig Harrington	
17–20 Nov	DP World Tour Championship, Dubai	European Tour	(Spain) Jon Rahm	
17–20 Nov	CME Group Tour Championship	LPGA Tour	(New Zealand) Lydia Ko	
