= Cadillac Championship =

Golf tournament in Doral, Florida

Tournament information
- Location: Doral, Florida, U.S.
- Established: 2026
- Courses: Trump National Doral (Blue Monster)
- Par: 72
- Length: 7,739 yards (7,077 m)
- Tour: PGA Tour
- Format: Stroke play
- Prize fund: $20,000,000
- Website: cadillacchampionship.com

Tournament record score
- Aggregate: 269 Cameron Young (2026)
- To par: −19 as above

Current champion
- (United States) Cameron Young

Location map
- Location in the United States Location in Florida

The Cadillac Championship is a professional golf tournament on the PGA Tour. The tournament was established in 2026 and is played on the Blue Monster course at Trump National Doral in Doral, Florida, near Miami. The course previously hosted the PGA Tour's Doral Open from 1962 to 2006 and the WGC Championship from 2007 to 2016.

== History ==
The Blue Monster course at Doral Golf Resort & Spa was designed by Dick Wilson and Robert von Hagge. It first hosted a PGA Tour event in 1962 – the Doral Open won by Billy Casper. In 2007, it became the host of the WGC Championship. After Donald Trump bought the Doral resort out of bankruptcy in 2012, he renamed it Trump National Doral and commissioned Gil Hanse to renovate the Blue Monster, adding length and more water hazards. The last edition was held at the 2016 WGC-Cadillac Championship. Automaker Cadillac, which had sponsored the event from 2011 to 2016, decided to not renew its contract and the PGA Tour was unable to find a replacement sponsor for the event at Doral, which led to the removal of Doral from the PGA Tour schedule. While not hosting a PGA Tour event, Trump National Doral served as host for the LIV Golf Miami tournament from 2022 to 2025.

In December 2025, the PGA Tour announced that Cadillac had returned as title sponsor and Trump National Doral would be part of the 2026 PGA Tour season. PGA Tour CEO Brian Rolapp described Doral as a "legacy venue on our schedule". The sponsorship was stated to be a "multi-year contract".

The Cadillac Championship was designated as a signature event and had a prize pool of $20 million. Although the prior event was called the WGC-Cadillac Championship, the Cadillac Championship was technically a new event and Adam Scott, the winner of the 2016 WGC-Cadillac Championship, was not considered the defending champion. The inaugural champion of the Cadillac Championship was Cameron Young, who shot 19-under to win by six strokes ahead of world number one Scottie Scheffler. For his victory, Young received $3.6 million.

== Winners ==
Year	Winner	Score	To par	Margin of victory	Runner-up	Purse ($)	Winner's share ($)
2026	(United States) Cameron Young	269	−19	6 strokes	(United States) Scottie Scheffler	20,000,000	3,600,000
