= 2022 FedEx Cup Playoffs =

Tournament information
- Dates: August 11–28, 2022
- Location: TPC Southwind; Wilmington Country Club; East Lake Golf Club
- Tour: PGA Tour

Statistics
- Field: 125 for FedEx St. Jude Championship; 70 for BMW Championship; 30 for Tour Championship
- Prize fund: $75 million (bonus money)
- Winner's share: $18 million (bonus money)

Champion
- (Northern Ireland) Rory McIlroy
- −21

The 2022 FedEx Cup Playoffs, the series of three golf tournaments that determined the 2021–22 season champion on the U.S.-based PGA Tour, was played from August 11–28. It included the following three events:

- FedEx St. Jude Championship – TPC Southwind, Memphis, Tennessee
- BMW Championship – Wilmington Country Club, Wilmington, Delaware
- Tour Championship – East Lake Golf Club, Atlanta, Georgia

They were the 16th FedEx Cup playoffs since their inception in 2007.

The point distributions can be seen here.

== Regular season rankings ==
The leading ten players in the FedEx Cup regular season standings qualified for a share of the $20 million Comcast Business Tour top 10 bonus.

Place	Player	Points	Events	Bonus ($)
1	(United States) Scottie Scheffler	3,556	22	4,000,000
2	(Australia) Cameron Smith	2,335	16	3,000,000
3	(United States) Sam Burns	2,275	21	2,400,000
4	(United States) Xander Schauffele	2,153	18	2,200,000
5	(United States) Patrick Cantlay	2,108	17	2,000,000
6	(Northern Ireland) Rory McIlroy	2,104	13	1,700,000
7	(United States) Tony Finau	1,912	22	1,400,000
8	(United States) Justin Thomas	1,783	18	1,200,000
9	(United States) Cameron Young	1,774	22	1,100,000
10	(South Korea) Im Sung-jae	1,733	23	1,000,000

=== Playoffs eligibility list ===
With several players having been suspended from the tour mid-season after participating in LIV Golf events without receiving a release to do so, the tour created a FedExCup Playoffs Eligibility ranking list which excluded them. Ten players who finished inside the top-125 of the standard FedExCup Standings were excluded: Talor Gooch, Jason Kokrak, Matt Jones, Hudson Swafford, Matthew Wolff, Abraham Ancer, Carlos Ortiz, Brooks Koepka, Charles Howell III, Pat Perez. Three of these (Gooch, Jones and Swafford) failed in their attempt to gain a temporary restraining order to allow them to compete in the playoffs. Despite this, Gooch finished 29th in the standings after the first two playoff events, which would normally have qualified him for the Tour Championship.

== FedEx St. Jude Championship ==
The FedEx St. Jude Championship was played August 11–14. 125 players were eligible to play in the event. Five players withdrew before the start, reducing the field to 120. Tommy Fleetwood (ranked 47) did not play for personal reasons. Lanto Griffin (ranked 69), Daniel Berger (ranked 78), and Nate Lashley (ranked 98) did not play due to injury. Hideki Matsuyama (ranked 11) withdrew due to a neck injury. 69 players made the second-round cut at 138 (−2).

Will Zalatoris won the event, beating Sepp Straka in a playoff. The top 70 players in the points standings advanced to the BMW Championship. This included four players who were outside the top 70 prior to The FedEx St. Jude Championship: Lucas Glover (ranked 121st to 34th), Adam Scott (77 to 45), Andrew Putnam (87 to 47), and Wyndham Clark (79 to 70). Four players started the tournament within the top 70 but ended the tournament outside the top 70, ending their playoff chances: Anirban Lahiri (ranked 63rd to 71st), John Huh (67 to 73), Brendon Todd (68 to 74), and Lanto Griffin (69 to 77).

					FedEx Cup rank	
Place	Player	Score	To par	Winnings ($)	Before	After
1	(United States) Will Zalatoris	71-63-65-66=265	−15	2,700,000	12	1
2	(Austria) Sepp Straka	64-66-68-67=265	−15	1,635,000	35	8
T3	(United States) Lucas Glover	65-68-69-66=268	−12	885,000	121	34
T3	(United States) Brian Harman	66-66-69-67=268	−12	885,000	55	23
T5	(United States) Tony Finau	64-68-69-68=269	−11	480,000	7	5
T5	(England) Matt Fitzpatrick	68-66-67-68=269	−11	480,000	14	12
T5	(United States) Collin Morikawa	67-69-66-67=269	−11	480,000	22	20
T5	(United States) Trey Mullinax	66-67-66-70=269	−11	480,000	70	40
T5	(United States) Andrew Putnam	66-68-67-68=269	−11	480,000	87	47
T5	(Spain) Jon Rahm	67-69-67-66=269	−11	480,000	16	14
T5	(Australia) Adam Scott	66-67-70-66=269	−11	480,000	77	45

- Par 70 course

== BMW Championship ==
The BMW Championship was played August 18–21. 70 players were eligible to play in the event. There was no second-round cut. Tommy Fleetwood and Cameron Smith did not play, reducing the field to 68.

Patrick Cantlay won the event, beating Scott Stallings by one stroke. The top 30 players in the points standings advanced to the Tour Championship. This included four players who were outside the top 30 prior to the BMW Championship: Scott Stallings (ranked 46th to 12th), Lee Kyoung-hoon (33 to 26), Adam Scott (45 to 29), and Aaron Wise (31 to 30). Four players started the tournament within the top 30 but ended the tournament outside the top 30, ending their playoff chances: Tom Kim (25 to 34), Davis Riley (26 to 35), Kevin Kisner (28 to 38), and J. J. Spaun (30 to 33).

					FedEx Cup rank	
Place	Player	Score	To par	Winnings ($)	After	Before
1	(United States) Patrick Cantlay	68-68-65-69=270	−14	2,700,000	2	7
2	(United States) Scott Stallings	68-68-66-69=271	−13	1,620,000	12	46
T3	(United States) Xander Schauffele	67-69-66-71=273	−11	870,000	4	6
T3	(United States) Scottie Scheffler	68-67-68-70=273	−11	870,000	1	2
T5	(Canada) Corey Conners	68-67-70-69=274	−10	547,500	24	29
T5	(South Korea) Lee Kyoung-hoon	68-70-71-65=274	−10	547,500	26	33
T5	(Australia) Adam Scott	65-69-69-71=274	−10	547,500	29	45
T8	(Northern Ireland) Rory McIlroy	68-68-70-69=275	−9	420,000	7	9
T8	(Chile) Joaquín Niemann	69-68-68-70=275	−9	420,000	19	19
T8	(Canada) Taylor Pendrith	71-68-67-69=275	−9	420,000	46	67
T8	(Spain) Jon Rahm	73-70-65-67=275	−9	420,000	11	14

- Par 71 course

== Tour Championship ==
The Tour Championship was played August 25–28. 30 golfers qualified for the tournament. Will Zalatoris did not play due to a back injury, reducing the field to 29. There was no second-round cut.

Players were allocated a starting score relative to par based on their position in the standings after the BMW Championship. The points leader started the tournament at 10 under par, number two at 8 under par, number three at 7 under par, number four at 6 under par and number five at 5 under par. Players ranked 6 to 10 started at 4 under par, 11 to 15 at 3 under par, 16 to 20 at 2 under par, 21 to 25 at 1 under par and 26 to 30 start at even par. The winner of the Tour Championship wins the FedEx Cup. For the purposes of the Official World Golf Ranking, points are awarded based on aggregate scores (total strokes taken, ignoring any starting scores).

Rory McIlroy won by one stroke over Im Sung-jae and Scottie Scheffler. He also had the best 72-hole aggregate score of 263. It was his third Tour Championship win and third FedEx Cup win.

Place	Player	Round scores	Starting score	Final score	FedEx Cup rank		Winnings ($)
Place	Player	Round scores	Starting score	Final score	After	Before	Winnings ($)
1	(Northern Ireland) Rory McIlroy	67-67-63-66=263	−4	−21	1	7	18,000,000
T2	(South Korea) Im Sung-jae	67-65-66-66=264	−4	−20	T2	10	5,750,000
T2	(United States) Scottie Scheffler	65-66-66-73=270	−10	−20	T2	1	5,750,000
4	(United States) Xander Schauffele	66-63-70-69=268	−6	−18	4	4	4,000,000
T5	(United States) Max Homa	71-62-66-66=265	−2	−17	T5	16	2,750,000
T5	(United States) Justin Thomas	67-68-63-68=266	−3	−17	T5	13	2,750,000
T7	(United States) Patrick Cantlay	70-66-66-70=272	−8	−16	T7	2	1,750,000
T7	(Austria) Sepp Straka	68-68-64-68=268	−4	−16	T7	9	1,750,000
9	(United States) Tony Finau	72-66-67-64=269	−4	−15	9	8	1,250,000
10	(United States) Tom Hoge	66-66-66-69=267	−1	−14	10	23	1,000,000

- Par 70 course

== Table of qualified players ==
Table key:

Win
Top-10 finish
Did not advance to next tournament
Played way into next tournament

	Player	Pre-Playoffs		FedEx St. Jude Championship		BMW Championship		Tour Championship		
	Player	Points	Rank	Finish	Rank after	Finish	Rank after	Starting score	Final score	Final rank
(United States)	Scottie Scheffler	3,556	1	CUT	2	T3	1	−10	−20	T2
(Australia)	Cameron Smith	2,335	2	T13	3	DNP	6	−4	−9	20
(United States)	Sam Burns	2,275	3	T20	4	T19	5	−5	−7	24
(United States)	Xander Schauffele	2,153	4	T57	6	T3	4	−6	−18	4
(United States)	Patrick Cantlay	2,108	5	T57	7	1	2	−8	−16	T7
(Northern Ireland)	Rory McIlroy	2,104	6	CUT	9	T8	7	−4	−21	1
(United States)	Tony Finau	1,912	7	T5	5	T28	8	−4	−15	9
(United States)	Justin Thomas	1,783	8	T13	10	T52	13	−3	−17	T5
(United States)	Cameron Young*	1,774	9	T31	13	T23	14	−3	−10	19
(South Korea)	Im Sung-jae	1,733	10	12	11	T15	10	−4	−20	T2
(Japan)	Hideki Matsuyama	1,697	11	DNP	15	T35	17	−2	−13	T11
(United States)	Will Zalatoris*	1,680	12	1	1	WD	3	−7	DNP	30
(United States)	Max Homa	1,625	13	T42	16	T23	16	−2	−17	T5
(England)	Matt Fitzpatrick	1,596	14	T5	12	T48	15	−3	−11	T15
(United States)	Jordan Spieth	1,574	15	CUT	17	T19	18	−2	−12	T13
(Spain)	Jon Rahm	1,449	16	T5	14	T8	11	−3	−11	T15
(United States)	Tom Hoge	1,424	17	CUT	21	T48	23	−1	−14	10
(United States)	Billy Horschel	1,403	18	CUT	22	T35	22	−1	−8	T21
(Norway)	Viktor Hovland	1,314	19	T20	18	T35	20	−2	−11	T15
(Chile)	Joaquín Niemann	1,228	20	T13	19	T8	19	−2	−13	T11
(United States)	J. T. Poston	1,146	21	T20	24	T35	27	E	−11	T15
(United States)	Collin Morikawa	1,089	22	T5	20	T44	21	−1	−8	T21
(United States)	Davis Riley*	1,045	23	T31	26	T54	35	–	–	35
(Republic of Ireland)	Séamus Power	990	24	CUT	36	65	42	–	–	42
(United States)	J. J. Spaun	985	25	T42	30	T23	33	–	–	33
(United States)	Cameron Tringale	957	26	CUT	39	63	47	–	–	47
(United States)	Aaron Wise	952	27	T31	31	T15	30	E	−12	T13
(Republic of Ireland)	Shane Lowry	942	28	T46	37	T12	31	–	–	31
(United States)	Luke List	938	29	CUT	42	T61	51	–	–	51
(Canada)	Corey Conners	936	30	T28	29	T5	24	−1	−3	26
(United States)	Maverick McNealy	936	31	T31	32	T32	37	–	–	37
(United States)	Russell Henley	934	32	CUT	43	T35	44	–	–	44
(United States)	Keegan Bradley	925	33	CUT	44	T58	53	–	–	53
(South Korea)	Tom Kim*	917	34	T13	25	T54	34	–	–	34
(Austria)	Sepp Straka	909	35	2	8	T28	9	−4	−16	T7
(United States)	Kevin Kisner	906	36	T20	28	T48	38	–	–	38
(United States)	Keith Mitchell	888	37	T31	38	T32	39	–	–	39
(Chile)	Mito Pereira*	888	38	T42	41	T54	49	–	–	49
(United States)	Sahith Theegala*	886	39	T13	27	T15	28	E	+1	28
(South Korea)	Lee Kyoung-hoon	853	40	T20	33	T5	26	E	−1	27
(United States)	Scott Stallings	852	41	CUT	46	2	12	−3	+3	29
(United States)	Denny McCarthy	842	42	T20	35	T28	36	–	–	36
(United States)	Kurt Kitayama*	839	43	CUT	48	T19	40	–	–	40
(Australia)	Lucas Herbert*	796	44	CUT	54	T15	43	–	–	43
(Colombia)	Sebastián Muñoz	795	45	T46	49	T35	54	–	–	54
(Canada)	Mackenzie Hughes	783	46	T46	52	T58	56	–	–	56
(England)	Tommy Fleetwood	766	47	DNP	56	DNP	62	–	–	62
(South Korea)	Kim Si-woo	751	48	T42	53	67	57	–	–	57
(England)	Tyrrell Hatton	749	49	T31	50	T23	48	–	–	48
(Canada)	Adam Hadwin	721	50	69	59	T44	61	–	–	61
(United States)	Chez Reavie	715	51	T51	58	T54	63	–	–	63
(United States)	Chris Kirk	707	52	CUT	61	T61	66	–	–	66
(South Africa)	Christiaan Bezuidenhout*	698	53	T64	60	T12	50	–	–	50
(United States)	Matt Kuchar	696	54	CUT	63	T35	64	–	–	64
(United States)	Brian Harman	694	55	T3	23	T35	25	−1	−8	T21
(Argentina)	Emiliano Grillo	691	56	T31	55	T19	52	–	–	52
(United States)	Brendan Steele	689	57	CUT	64	T32	59	–	–	59
(United States)	Harold Varner III	682	58	CUT	65	T48	67	–	–	67
(Sweden)	Alex Norén	681	59	WD	66	T52	68	–	–	68
(Canada)	Taylor Pendrith*	663	60	68	67	T8	46	–	–	46
(United States)	Alex Smalley*	658	61	CUT	69	T44	69	–	–	69
(Australia)	Marc Leishman	656	62	T64	68	T28	58	–	–	58
(India)	Anirban Lahiri	642	63	CUT	71	–	–	–	–	71
(United States)	Troy Merritt	639	64	T28	57	T58	60	–	–	60
(United States)	Taylor Moore*	623	65	T31	62	T44	65	–	–	65
(Australia)	Cameron Davis	614	66	T13	51	T35	55	–	–	55
(United States)	John Huh	612	67	WD	73	–	–	–	–	73
(United States)	Brendon Todd	592	68	67	74	–	–	–	–	74
(United States)	Lanto Griffin	592	69	DNP	77	–	–	–	–	77
(United States)	Trey Mullinax	590	70	T5	40	T12	32	–	–	32
(United States)	Brandon Wu*	586	71	CUT	78	–	–	–	–	78
(United States)	Matthew NeSmith	576	72	CUT	79	–	–	–	–	79
(United States)	Gary Woodland	573	73	T51	75	–	–	–	–	75
(United States)	Beau Hossler	572	74	T57	76	–	–	–	–	76
(United States)	Chad Ramey*	568	75	CUT	80	–	–	–	–	80
(United States)	Adam Long	564	76	CUT	81	–	–	–	–	81
(Australia)	Adam Scott	551	77	T5	45	T5	29	E	−4	25
(United States)	Daniel Berger	529	78	DNP	86	–	–	–	–	86
(United States)	Wyndham Clark	527	79	T28	70	64	70	–	–	70
(United States)	Joel Dahmen	524	80	CUT	87	–	–	–	–	87
(United States)	Patrick Rodgers	517	81	CUT	90	–	–	–	–	90
(Scotland)	Russell Knox	514	82	CUT	91	–	–	–	–	91
(United States)	Kevin Streelman	509	83	CUT	93	–	–	–	–	93
(United States)	Mark Hubbard	508	84	CUT	94	–	–	–	–	94
(United States)	David Lipsky*	505	85	T46	84	–	–	–	–	84
(United States)	Peter Malnati	501	86	CUT	95	–	–	–	–	95
(United States)	Andrew Putnam	498	87	T5	47	T23	45	–	–	45
(England)	Aaron Rai*	491	88	T51	88	–	–	–	–	88
(New Zealand)	Danny Lee	490	89	CUT	96	–	–	–	–	96
(Canada)	Adam Svensson*	483	90	T51	92	–	–	–	–	92
(Germany)	Stephan Jäger*	480	91	T46	89	–	–	–	–	89
(Taiwan)	Pan Cheng-tsung	473	92	CUT	99	–	–	–	–	99
(United States)	Adam Schenk	461	93	T31	85	–	–	–	–	85
(England)	Justin Rose	458	94	CUT	100	–	–	–	–	100
(United States)	Hayden Buckley*	456	95	T61	98	–	–	–	–	98
(United States)	Vince Whaley*	438	96	CUT	103	–	–	–	–	103
(Venezuela)	Jhonattan Vegas	428	97	CUT	105	–	–	–	–	105
(United States)	Nate Lashley	427	98	DNP	106	–	–	–	–	106
(United States)	Lee Hodges*	424	99	T13	72	–	–	–	–	72
(Scotland)	Martin Laird	421	100	T57	101	–	–	–	–	101
(United States)	Sam Ryder	412	101	T51	102	–	–	–	–	102
(United States)	Scott Piercy	410	102	WD	110	–	–	–	–	110
(United States)	Michael Thompson	406	103	T31	97	–	–	–	–	97
(England)	Callum Tarren*	405	104	CUT	111	–	–	–	–	111
(United States)	Max McGreevy*	404	105	CUT	112	–	–	–	–	112
(United States)	Chesson Hadley	404	106	CUT	113	–	–	–	–	113
(South Africa)	Dylan Frittelli	401	107	T20	82	–	–	–	–	82
(United States)	James Hahn	400	108	T61	107	–	–	–	–	107
(United States)	Greyson Sigg*	397	109	T61	108	–	–	–	–	108
(United States)	Ryan Palmer	391	110	T20	83	–	–	–	–	83
(United States)	Nick Watney	387	111	CUT	114	–	–	–	–	114
(United States)	Robert Streb	385	112	T51	109	–	–	–	–	109
(Australia)	Jason Day	385	113	CUT	115	–	–	–	–	115
(United States)	Doug Ghim	385	114	CUT	116	–	–	–	–	116
(United States)	Stewart Cink	376	115	CUT	117	–	–	–	–	117
(United States)	Kevin Tway	361	116	CUT	118	–	–	–	–	118
(United States)	Ryan Brehm*	359	117	CUT	119	–	–	–	–	119
(United States)	Tyler Duncan	355	118	T31	104	–	–	–	–	104
(Austria)	Matthias Schwab*	353	119	CUT	120	–	–	–	–	120
(United States)	Patton Kizzire	351	120	CUT	121	–	–	–	–	121
(United States)	Lucas Glover	349	121	T3	34	66	41	–	–	41
(United States)	Webb Simpson	346	122	CUT	122	–	–	–	–	122
(Canada)	Nick Taylor	333	123	CUT	124	–	–	–	–	124
(United States)	Kramer Hickok	328	124	CUT	125	–	–	–	–	125
(United States)	Rickie Fowler	324	125	T64	123	–	–	–	–	123

* First-time Playoffs qualifier
DNP = Did not play
WD = Withdrew
