= 2022 Players Championship =

Golf tournament

Tournament information
- Dates: March 10–14, 2022
- Location: Ponte Vedra Beach, Florida; 30.198°N 81.394°W
- Courses: TPC Sawgrass (Stadium Course)
- Tour: PGA Tour

Statistics
- Par: 72
- Length: 7,189 yards (6,574 m)
- Field: 144 players, 71 after cut
- Cut: 146 (+2)
- Prize fund: US$20,000,000
- Winner's share: US$3,600,000

Champion
- (Australia) Cameron Smith
- 275 (−13)
- Location in the United States Location in Florida

The 2022 Players Championship was the 48th Players Championship, held March 10–14 at TPC Sawgrass in Ponte Vedra Beach, Florida. It was the 41st edition at the Stadium Course and concluded on Monday due to weather delays. The purse was increased by a third this year to twenty million dollars.

Cameron Smith shot a six-under-par 66 in the final round to finish at 275 (−13) to win his first Players Championship, one stroke ahead of runner-up Anirban Lahiri, the 54-hole leader. Defending champion Justin Thomas finished ten strokes back, tied for 33rd place.

== Venue ==
=== Course layout ===
The 2022 Players Championship
Tee	Rating/Slope	1	2	3	4	5	6	7	8	9	Out	10	11	12	13	14	15	16	17	18	In	Total
Par		4	5	3	4	4	4	4	3	5	36	4	5	4	3	4	4	5	3	4	36	72
Round 1		432	527	186	376	474	381	456	237	583	3,652	406	557	369	182	460	450	506	137	462	3,529	7,181
Round 2		419	536	167	384	459	386	449	204	577	3,581	424	547	352	185	474	461	532	136	436	3,547	7,128
Round 3		425	533	165	388	470	383	440	219	574	3,597	404	532	341	175	486	449	522	123	459	3,491	7,088
Round 4		412	538	185	388	458	390	427	231	586	3,615	423	540	300	152	463	448	521	135	445	3,427	7,042

== Field ==
The field consisted of 144 players meeting various criteria; they include tournament winners on the PGA Tour since the previous Players Championship, recent winners of major championships, The Players and World Golf Championships, and leading players in the FedEx Cup standings from the current and preceding seasons.

=== Eligibility criteria ===
This list details the eligibility criteria for the 2022 Players Championship and the players who qualified under them; any additional criteria under which players were eligible is indicated in parentheses.

1. Winners of PGA Tour events since the 2021 Players Championship

- Abraham Ancer (10,16,18)
- Ryan Brehm
- Sam Burns (16,18,21)
- Patrick Cantlay (7,13,16,18)
- Cameron Champ (16)
- Stewart Cink (16)
- Joel Dahmen (16)
- Cameron Davis (16)
- Tony Finau (16,18)
- Lucas Glover (16)
- Talor Gooch (16,18,21)
- Lucas Herbert
- Garrick Higgo (16)
- Tom Hoge (16,18,21)
- Max Homa (14,16,18)
- Billy Horschel (9,16,18)
- Viktor Hovland (16,18)
- Im Sung-jae (16,18,21)
- Matt Jones (16)
- Kevin Kisner (9,16,18)
- Jason Kokrak (16,18)
- Lee Kyoung-hoon (16)
- Marc Leishman (16,18)
- Luke List (16,21)
- Rory McIlroy (7,11,16,18)
- Collin Morikawa (5,6,8,16,18,21)
- Joaquín Niemann (14,16,18,21)
- Séamus Power (16,18)
- Jon Rahm (4,13,16,18)
- Scottie Scheffler (12,18,21)
- Cameron Smith (16,18,21)
- Jordan Spieth (16,18)
- Sepp Straka (14,16)
- Hudson Swafford (16)
- Erik van Rooyen (16)
- Hideki Matsuyama (2,16,18,21) did not play. (Note: Hideki Matsuyama withdrew on the morning of the first round due to a back injury; he was replaced by Patrick Rodgers.)

2. Recent winners of the Masters Tournament (2017–2021)

- Sergio García (16,18)
- Dustin Johnson (4,7,8,16,18)
- Patrick Reed (8,16,18)
- Tiger Woods did not play.

3. Recent winners of The Players Championship (2016–2021)

- Jason Day (16)
- Kim Si-woo (16)
- Webb Simpson (16,18)
- Justin Thomas (5,10,16,18)

4. Recent winners of the U.S. Open (2016–2021)

- Brooks Koepka (5,10,16,18)
- Gary Woodland (16)
- Bryson DeChambeau (12,13,16,18) did not play. (Note: Bryson DeChambeau withdrew; he was replaced by Hayden Buckley.)

5. Recent winners of the PGA Championship (2016–2021)

- Jimmy Walker
- Phil Mickelson (16,18) did not play.

6. Recent winners of The Open Championship (2016–2021)

- Shane Lowry (16,18)
- Francesco Molinari (12)
- Henrik Stenson

7. Recent winners of the FedEx Cup (2018/19–2020/21)

8. Recent winners of the WGC Championship (2019–2021)

9. Recent winners of the WGC Match Play (2018–2021)

- Bubba Watson (16)

10. Recent winners of the WGC Invitational (2018–2021)

11. Recent winners of the WGC-HSBC Champions (2018–2019)

- Xander Schauffele (15,16,18)

12. Recent winners of the Arnold Palmer Invitational (2019–2022)

- Tyrrell Hatton (16,18)

13. Recent winners of the Memorial Tournament (2018–2021)

14. Recent winners of the Genesis Invitational (2020–2022)

- Adam Scott (16,18)

15. Winner of the Olympic Golf Competition in 2021

16. Top 125 from the previous season's FedEx Cup points list

- Daniel Berger (18)
- Keegan Bradley
- Paul Casey (18)
- Wyndham Clark
- Corey Conners (18)
- Matt Fitzpatrick (18)
- Dylan Frittelli
- Brice Garnett
- Brian Gay
- Doug Ghim
- Branden Grace
- Lanto Griffin
- Emiliano Grillo
- Chesson Hadley
- Adam Hadwin
- Brandon Hagy
- James Hahn
- Brian Harman
- Russell Henley (18)
- Kramer Hickok
- Harry Higgs
- Charley Hoffman
- Mackenzie Hughes
- Zach Johnson
- Chris Kirk
- Patton Kizzire
- Russell Knox
- Matt Kuchar
- Anirban Lahiri
- Martin Laird
- Hank Lebioda
- Adam Long
- Peter Malnati
- Denny McCarthy
- Maverick McNealy
- Troy Merritt
- Keith Mitchell
- Sebastián Muñoz
- Matthew NeSmith
- Henrik Norlander
- Alex Norén
- Louis Oosthuizen (18)
- Carlos Ortiz
- Ryan Palmer
- Pan Cheng-tsung
- Pat Perez
- Scott Piercy
- J. T. Poston
- Ian Poulter
- Andrew Putnam
- Chez Reavie
- Doc Redman
- Sam Ryder
- Adam Schenk
- Charl Schwartzel
- Roger Sloan
- Brandt Snedeker
- Scott Stallings
- Kyle Stanley
- Brendan Steele
- Robert Streb
- Kevin Streelman
- Brian Stuard
- Brendon Todd
- Cameron Tringale (18)
- Harold Varner III (18)
- Jhonattan Vegas
- Matt Wallace
- Richy Werenski
- Lee Westwood (18)
- Aaron Wise
- Matthew Wolff (18)
- Harris English (18), Kevin Na (18) (Note: Kevin Na withdrew due to the imminent birth of his third child; he was replaced by Taylor Moore.) and Tyler McCumber (Note: Tyler McCumber withdrew due to a shoulder injury on Friday morning, which because of weather delays on Thursday was still before the start of his first round; he was replaced by Michael Thompson, who got the place after Aaron Rai withdrew as an alternate.) did not play.

17. The top 125 players who fulfilled the terms of a major medical extension

- Danny Lee

18. Top 50 from the Official World Golf Ranking following The Honda Classic

- Tommy Fleetwood
- Thomas Pieters
- Justin Rose
- Will Zalatoris

19. Senior Players champion from previous year

- Steve Stricker did not play due to illness.

20. Leading points winners from the Korn Ferry Tour and Korn Ferry Tour Finals during the previous year

- Joseph Bramlett
- Stephan Jäger

21. Top 10 in the current season's FedEx Cup points standings after The Honda Classic

22. Remaining positions and alternates filled through current year FedEx Cup standings after The Honda Classic

- Cameron Young (15)
- Mito Pereira (34)
- Sahith Theegala (42)
- Nick Watney (43)
- J. J. Spaun (47)
- Kevin Tway (48)
- Beau Hossler (53)
- Lee Hodges (54)
- Taylor Pendrith (61)
- Hayden Buckley (62)
- Taylor Moore (64)
- Patrick Rodgers (66)
- Michael Thompson (68)

== Round summaries ==
=== First round ===
Thursday, March 10, 2022
Friday, March 11, 2022
Saturday, March 12, 2022

Overnight rain delayed the start by an hour and further delays during the day meant that only 66 of the 144 players completed their opening round on Thursday, while 12 players did not start their rounds. Tommy Fleetwood and Tom Hoge were top of the leaderboard after opening rounds of 66, 6-under-par, when play was suspended due to darkness. Harold Varner III had earlier led at 7-under-par, but he made a triple-bogey 6 at the 17th hole and, after a bogey at the last, finished with 69. The first round resumed on Friday, but after another weather delay, the course was declared unplayable by Tour officials with 47 of the 144 players not having completed their opening round. Play resumed at noon on Saturday in windy conditions. The first round was completed in the early afternoon, 54 hours after it has started. Fleetwood and Hoge still led with six players a stroke behind.

Place	Player	Score	To par
T1	(England) Tommy Fleetwood	66	−6
T1	(United States) Tom Hoge	66	−6
T3	(United States) Daniel Berger	67	−5
T3	(United States) Brice Garnett	67	−5
T3	(United States) Kramer Hickok	67	−5
T3	(India) Anirban Lahiri	67	−5
T3	(United States) Keith Mitchell	67	−5
T3	(Chile) Joaquín Niemann	67	−5
T9	(Mexico) Abraham Ancer	68	−4
T9	(United States) Sam Burns	68	−4
T9	(United States) Brian Harman	68	−4
T9	(United States) Kevin Kisner	68	−4
T9	(United States) Patton Kizzire	68	−4
T9	(Canada) Taylor Pendrith	68	−4

=== Second round ===
Saturday, March 12, 2022
Sunday, March 13, 2022

The second round started at noon on Saturday, before the first round was completed. In windy conditions, less than half the field were able to complete their rounds and a number of groups did not start their rounds. 71 players made the cut at 146 (+2), when the second round was completed at about 3 pm on Sunday. The co-leaders were Sam Burns and Tom Hoge at 137, 7-under-par.

Place	Player	Score	To par
T1	(United States) Sam Burns	68-69=137	−7
T1	(United States) Tom Hoge	66-71=137	−7
T3	(South Africa) Erik van Rooyen	71-67=138	−6
T3	(United States) Harold Varner III	69-69=138	−6
T5	(Mexico) Abraham Ancer	68-71=139	−5
T5	(England) Paul Casey	70-69=139	−5
T5	(Canada) Corey Conners	70-69=139	−5
T5	(England) Tommy Fleetwood	66-73=139	−5
T5	(United States) Keith Mitchell	67-72=139	−5
T5	(Canada) Taylor Pendrith	68-71=139	−5

=== Third round ===
Sunday, March 13, 2022
Monday, March 14, 2022

The third round started at 3:15 pm on Sunday using both the first and tenth tees.

Place	Player	Score	To par
1	(India) Anirban Lahiri	67-73-67=207	−9
T2	(United States) Sam Burns	68-69-71=208	−8
T2	(England) Paul Casey	70-69-69=208	−8
T2	(United States) Doug Ghim	70-70-68=208	−8
T2	(Colombia) Sebastián Muñoz	70-73-65=208	−8
T6	(United States) Tom Hoge	66-71-72=209	−7
T6	(Australia) Cameron Smith	69-71-69=209	−7
T8	(United States) Kevin Kisner	68-74-68=210	−6
T8	(Scotland) Russell Knox	70-73-68=210	−6
T8	(Republic of Ireland) Shane Lowry	73-70-67=210	−6
T8	(South Africa) Louis Oosthuizen	69-72-69=210	−6
T8	(United States) Kevin Streelman	73-71-66=210	−6
T8	(United States) Harold Varner III	69-69-72=210	−6
T8	(United States) Will Zalatoris	69-71-70=210	−6

=== Final round ===
Monday, March 14, 2022

The final round started at 11:00 am using both the first and tenth tees.

Champion
(c) = past champion

Place	Player	Score	To par	Money ($)
1	(Australia) Cameron Smith	69-71-69-66=275	−13	3,600,000
2	(India) Anirban Lahiri	67-73-67-69=276	−12	2,180,000
3	(England) Paul Casey	70-69-69-69=277	−11	1,380,000
4	(United States) Kevin Kisner	68-74-68-68=278	−10	980,000
5	(United States) Keegan Bradley	72-71-68-68=279	−9	820,000
T6	(United States) Doug Ghim	70-70-68-72=280	−8	675,000
T6	(Scotland) Russell Knox	71-71-68-70=280	−8	675,000
T6	(United States) Harold Varner III	69-69-72-70=280	−8	675,000
T9	(Canada) Adam Hadwin	72-72-70-67=281	−7	525,000
T9	(Norway) Viktor Hovland	71-73-68-69=281	−7	525,000
T9	(United States) Dustin Johnson	69-73-76-63=281	−7	525,000
T9	(Austria) Sepp Straka	69-74-71-67=281	−7	525,000

Leaderboard below the top 10
Place	Player	Score	To par	Money ($)
T13	(United States) Daniel Berger	67-75-70-70=282	−6	327,222
T13	(England) Tyrrell Hatton	70-73-69-70=282	−6	327,222
T13	(United States) Russell Henley	69-73-72-68=282	−6	327,222
T13	(United States) Max Homa	72-73-71-66=282	−6	327,222
T13	(Republic of Ireland) Shane Lowry	73-70-67-72=282	−6	327,222
T13	(United States) Keith Mitchell	67-72-74-69=282	−6	327,222
T13	(Canada) Taylor Pendrith	68-71-74-69=282	−6	327,222
T13	(United States) Brendan Steele	73-69-69-71=282	−6	327,222
T13	(South Africa) Erik van Rooyen	71-67-74-70=282	−6	327,222
T22	(England) Tommy Fleetwood	66-73-72-72=283	−5	201,000
T22	(United States) Patton Kizzire	68-76-72-67=283	−5	201,000
T22	(Chile) Joaquín Niemann	67-73-73-70=283	−5	201,000
T22	(United States) Kevin Streelman	73-71-66-73=283	−5	201,000
T26	(United States) Sam Burns	68-69-71-76=284	−4	143,000
T26	(Canada) Corey Conners	70-69-75-70=284	−4	143,000
T26	(Spain) Sergio García (c)	71-71-71-71=284	−4	143,000
T26	(Sweden) Alex Norén	69-75-71-69=284	−4	143,000
T26	(United States) Doc Redman	71-70-72-71=284	−4	143,000
T26	(United States) Patrick Reed	73-70-68-73=284	−4	143,000
T26	(United States) Will Zalatoris	69-71-70-74=284	−4	143,000
T33	(Mexico) Abraham Ancer	68-71-74-72=285	−3	100,111
T33	(United States) Joel Dahmen	70-71-71-73=285	−3	100,111
T33	(United States) Tom Hoge	66-71-72-76=285	−3	100,111
T33	(Northern Ireland) Rory McIlroy (c)	73-73-73-66=285	−3	100,111
T33	(Colombia) Sebastián Muñoz	70-73-65-77=285	−3	100,111
T33	(United States) Pat Perez	70-72-75-68=285	−3	100,111
T33	(England) Ian Poulter	73-70-71-71=285	−3	100,111
T33	(Republic of Ireland) Séamus Power	71-71-73-70=285	−3	100,111
T33	(United States) Justin Thomas (c)	72-69-72-72=285	−3	100,111
T42	(United States) Kramer Hickok	67-75-71-73=286	−2	73,000
T42	(Italy) Francesco Molinari	70-73-69-74=286	−2	73,000
T42	(South Africa) Louis Oosthuizen	69-72-69-76=286	−2	73,000
T42	(United States) Scott Stallings	71-75-65-75=286	−2	73,000
T46	(United States) Adam Long	71-71-75-70=287	−1	57,700
T46	(United States) Peter Malnati	70-75-72-70=287	−1	57,700
T46	(United States) Maverick McNealy	70-76-70-71=287	−1	57,700
T46	(United States) Troy Merritt	74-71-71-71=287	−1	57,700
T50	(South Africa) Dylan Frittelli	73-72-73-70=288	E	50,200
T50	(United States) Brice Garnett	67-76-74-71=288	E	50,200
T50	(United States) Aaron Wise	71-74-74-69=288	E	50,200
T53	(South Africa) Branden Grace	71-72-73-73=289	+1	47,800
T53	(United States) Jason Kokrak	72-72-71-74=289	+1	47,800
T55	(South Korea) Im Sung-jae	72-72-70-76=290	+2	46,200
T55	(South Korea) Lee Kyoung-hoon	70-73-76-71=290	+2	46,200
T55	(Spain) Jon Rahm	69-72-72-77=290	+2	46,200
T55	(United States) Scottie Scheffler	70-76-68-76=290	+2	46,200
T55	(United States) Jimmy Walker	70-73-71-76=290	+2	46,200
T60	(United States) Denny McCarthy	70-76-73-72=291	+3	44,600
T60	(United States) Sam Ryder	69-74-73-75=291	+3	44,600
T60	(United States) Michael Thompson	72-73-74-72=291	+3	44,600
T63	(United States) Chesson Hadley	70-74-71-77=292	+4	43,400
T63	(United States) Brian Harman	68-74-75-75=292	+4	43,400
T63	(United States) Hank Lebioda	72-70-72-78=292	+4	43,400
T66	(United States) Hayden Buckley	72-71-76-74=293	+5	42,400
T66	(United States) Nick Watney	75-71-75-72=293	+5	42,400
T68	(Australia) Lucas Herbert	70-74-75-76=295	+7	41,600
T68	(United States) Bubba Watson	73-68-78-76=295	+7	41,600
70	(United States) Lee Hodges	72-74-75-76=297	+9	41,000
WD	(United States) Billy Horschel (Note: Horschel withdrew before the start of play on Monday due to illness; he had completed 13 holes of his third round.)	74-70-52=196	E	40,600
CUT	(Australia) Cameron Davis	71-76=147	+3	
CUT	(Australia) Jason Day (c)	69-78=147	+3	
CUT	(United States) Charley Hoffman	74-73=147	+3	
CUT	(United States) Chris Kirk	71-76=147	+3	
CUT	(United States) Matt Kuchar (c)	74-73=147	+3	
CUT	(Australia) Marc Leishman	69-78=147	+3	
CUT	(Sweden) Henrik Norlander	73-74=147	+3	
CUT	(Mexico) Carlos Ortiz	73-74=147	+3	
CUT	(United States) Scott Piercy	70-77=147	+3	
CUT	(United States) Patrick Rodgers	73-74=147	+3	
CUT	(Venezuela) Jhonattan Vegas	69-78=147	+3	
CUT	(England) Matt Fitzpatrick	74-74=148	+4	
CUT	(United States) Lucas Glover	74-74=148	+4	
CUT	(United States) Talor Gooch	70-78=148	+4	
CUT	(South Africa) Garrick Higgo	74-74=148	+4	
CUT	(Canada) Mackenzie Hughes	72-76=148	+4	
CUT	(United States) Collin Morikawa	73-75=148	+4	
CUT	(Taiwan) Pan Cheng-tsung	69-79=148	+4	
CUT	(United States) Andrew Putnam	69-79=148	+4	
CUT	(England) Justin Rose	69-79=148	+4	
CUT	(South Africa) Charl Schwartzel	75-73=148	+4	
CUT	(Australia) Adam Scott (c)	78-70=148	+4	
CUT	(United States) Hudson Swafford	73-75=148	+4	
CUT	(United States) Richy Werenski	71-77=148	+4	
CUT	(United States) Cameron Young	71-77=148	+4	
CUT	(United States) Joseph Bramlett	75-74=149	+5	
CUT	(United States) Patrick Cantlay	72-77=149	+5	
CUT	(United States) Wyndham Clark	73-76=149	+5	
CUT	(Australia) Matt Jones	79-70=149	+5	
CUT	(Chile) Mito Pereira	72-77=149	+5	
CUT	(United States) Webb Simpson (c)	75-74=149	+5	
CUT	(United States) Brian Stuard	73-76=149	+5	
CUT	(United States) Lanto Griffin	70-80=150	+6	
CUT	(Scotland) Martin Laird	72-78=150	+6	
CUT	(Canada) Roger Sloan	73-77=150	+6	
CUT	(United States) Gary Woodland	71-79=150	+6	
CUT	(United States) Cameron Champ	72-79=151	+7	
CUT	(United States) Tony Finau	76-75=151	+7	
CUT	(United States) Beau Hossler	71-80=151	+7	
CUT	(United States) Ryan Palmer	71-80=151	+7	
CUT	(Belgium) Thomas Pieters	73-78=151	+7	
CUT	(United States) Xander Schauffele	73-78=151	+7	
CUT	(United States) Adam Schenk	78-73=151	+7	
CUT	(United States) J. J. Spaun	73-78=151	+7	
CUT	(United States) Jordan Spieth	72-79=151	+7	
CUT	(United States) Robert Streb	74-77=151	+7	
CUT	(United States) Kevin Tway	73-78=151	+7	
CUT	(United States) Stewart Cink	77-75=152	+8	
CUT	(Germany) Stephan Jäger	77-75=152	+8	
CUT	(United States) Brandt Snedeker	72-80=152	+8	
CUT	(United States) Kyle Stanley	74-78=152	+8	
CUT	(United States) Brendon Todd	78-74=152	+8	
CUT	(United States) Cameron Tringale	73-79=152	+8	
CUT	(England) Matt Wallace	76-76=152	+8	
CUT	(United States) James Hahn	74-79=153	+9	
CUT	(United States) Harry Higgs	77-76=153	+9	
CUT	(United States) Zach Johnson	73-80=153	+9	
CUT	(United States) Brooks Koepka	72-81=153	+9	
CUT	(United States) Matthew NeSmith	79-74=153	+9	
CUT	(United States) J. T. Poston	78-75=153	+9	
CUT	(United States) Sahith Theegala	74-79=153	+9	
CUT	(England) Lee Westwood	73-80=153	+9	
CUT	(United States) Matthew Wolff	72-81=153	+9	
CUT	(United States) Brandon Hagy	78-76=154	+10	
CUT	(United States) Taylor Moore	74-80=154	+10	
CUT	(United States) Ryan Brehm	74-81=155	+11	
CUT	(United States) Brian Gay	76-81=157	+13	
CUT	(United States) Chez Reavie	80-77=157	+13	
CUT	(Argentina) Emiliano Grillo	77-82=159	+15	
WD	(Sweden) Henrik Stenson (c) (Note: Stenson withdrew before the start of play on Sunday; he had completed 17 holes of his second round.)	73-73=146	+1	
WD	(South Korea) Kim Si-woo (c) (Note: Kim withdrew before the start of play on Sunday; he had completed 17 holes of his second round.)	76-70=146	+4	
WD	(New Zealand) Danny Lee (Note: Lee withdrew before the start of play on Sunday; he had completed 16 holes of his second round.)	77-64=141	+5	
WD	(United States) Luke List (Note: List withdrew on Friday morning due to a neck injury; he had completed 8 holes of his first round.)	36	+4	

==== Scorecard ====
Final round

Hole	1	2	3	4	5	6	7	8	9	10	11	12	13	14	15	16	17	18
Par	4	5	3	4	4	4	4	3	5	4	5	4	3	4	4	5	3	4
(Australia) Smith	−8	−9	−10	−11	−11	−12	−11	−10	−9	−10	−11	−12	−13	−13	−13	−13	−14	−13
(India) Lahiri	−9	−9	−9	−10	−10	−10	−10	−8	−9	−9	−11	−11	−11	−11	−11	−11	−12	−12
(England) Casey	−8	−8	−8	−8	−8	−8	−9	−8	−9	−9	−10	−11	−11	−11	−11	−11	−11	−11
(United States) Kisner	−6	−7	−7	−7	−7	−8	−8	−7	−7	−7	−6	−7	−7	−7	−8	−9	−10	−10
(United States) Bradley	−5	−5	−5	−6	−5	−6	−6	−6	−7	−8	−9	−10	−10	−10	−11	−12	−11	−9
(United States) Ghim	−8	−6	−6	−7	−7	−7	−7	−6	−6	−5	−6	−7	−7	−7	−7	−8	−8	−8
(Scotland) Knox	−7	−8	−8	−9	−8	−8	−7	−7	−7	−7	−8	−8	−7	−7	−7	−7	−7	−8
(United States) Varner	−6	−6	−6	−6	−6	−6	−5	−5	−5	−6	−7	−7	−7	−7	−8	−8	−8	−8
(United States) Burns	−7	−7	−6	−6	−6	−6	−5	−5	−6	−5	−5	−4	−4	−5	−5	−6	−4	−4
(Colombia) Muñoz	−6	−5	−5	−5	−5	−6	−6	−6	−6	−6	−7	−7	−7	−7	−7	−5	−4	−3

Cumulative tournament scores, relative to par

Eagle	Birdie	Bogey	Double bogey
