= Steve Bornstein =

American broadcasting executive

- Born: April 20, 1952 (age 74); Fair Lawn, New Jersey
- Education: University of Wisconsin-Madison
- Occupation: Corporate executive

Steve Bornstein (born April 20, 1952) is the chairman of the Media Networks division of the gaming company Activision Blizzard. He previously held executive leadership roles at NFL Network, ESPN, and ABC. While at ESPN, he organized showing SportsCenter reruns during the morning.

== Early life and education ==
Bornstein was born and raised in a Jewish family in Fair Lawn, New Jersey, to Julian Leon and Marge Frankel Bornstein. Bornstein is the youngest of four siblings. He attended the University of Wisconsin–Madison and graduated in 1974 with a Bachelor of Science in communications.

== Career ==
Bornstein began his career as a producer, and later executive producer, at WOSU-TV in Columbus, Ohio. He also worked with Warner-Amex Cable, producing Ohio State Buckeyes football programming for the company's interactive QUBE system.

=== ESPN ===
In January 1980, he joined ESPN as the manager of program coordination when the cable sports network was a four-month-old start-up. During his time as manager of programming coordination, he developed and implemented ESPN's successful programming philosophy of presenting a mix of events, sports news and special interest programming. In 1988, Bornstein was promoted to Executive Vice President of Programming and Production. He advanced through the network's programming and production ranks, becoming ESPN's youngest president and CEO in 1990 at age 38.

In January 1992, ESPN Radio was launched and began a rollout of 24-hour programming in October 1998. Also in 1992, Bornstein established the subsidiary ESPN Enterprises to develop new businesses like ESPN.com, which has grown to become the leading sports news and information site on the internet.

Bornstein helped to oversee the debut of ESPN2 in October 1993 and ESPNews in November 1996. In October 1997, Bornstein directed the acquisition of Classic Sports Network and rebranded the channel as ESPN Classic, adding yet another network to the ESPN family. Additionally, Bornstein oversaw the development of ESPN International, which has grown to include ownership - in whole or in part - of 24 television networks internationally, as well as a variety of additional businesses that allow ESPN to reach sports fans in over 61 countries and territories across all seven continents.

In March 1998, ESPN the Magazine was launched as a joint venture of Disney Publishing and ESPN with distribution being handled by Hearst Magazines.

Throughout his time at ESPN, the network created the SportsCenter franchise, NFL Countdown, NFL PrimeTime, Baseball Tonight and the Outside the Lines series. In addition to his contributions to ESPN programming, Bornstein developed the X Games and Winter X Games, week-long extreme sports competitions. Bornstein is also credited with the creation of the ESPYs Awards, short for Excellence in Sports Performance Yearly Award. First awarded in 1993.

During his tenure at ESPN, Bornstein's team won 59 Emmys and 57 Cable Ace Awards.

=== American Broadcasting Company ===
In April 1996, Bornstein was named President of ABC Sports. In a short time, Bornstein established ABC Sports as the preeminent network of college football, creating the College Football Championship Series, and extending contracts with all major CFB conferences.

In 1999, Bornstein was named President of ABC, where he was responsible for all the media network and cable assets at ABC/Disney.

=== NFL Network ===
In January 2003, Bornstein was appointed president and CEO of NFL Network and Executive Vice President of Media by then NFL Commissioner Paul Tagliabue. While at the NFL, Bornstein oversaw the league's media division, which included the relationships with national broadcast and sponsorship partners as well as NFL-owned media assets and revenue.

In November 2003, Bornstein launched NFL Network, which was the most widely distributed sports network in the history of the industry when it launched and became the youngest network ever to win a Sports Emmy after just 58 days on the air.

On April 14, 2004, Bornstein was integral in creating the first NFL schedule release special. The two-hour segment was the first of its kind to announce the schedule for the upcoming NFL season. Since then, similar segments have aired each year across various competing networks in prime time. It was also Bornstein's suggestion to move the start of each NFL Draft from Saturday afternoon to Thursday evenings in prime time. The yearly draft has since become a staple on the NFL calendar with millions of people tuning in every year.

In 2009, Bornstein spearheaded the creation of NFL RedZone, the widely acclaimed channel produced by NFL Network that whips around live to every NFL game on Sunday afternoons delivering the touchdowns and most exciting moments to viewers.

Under Bornstein's leadership, NFL Network and NFL RedZone completed distribution deals with Cablevision and Time Warner Cable in 2012. Currently in more than 72 million homes, NFL Network now has carriage agreements with each of the country's largest television providers including Comcast, DirecTV, DISH Network, Cablevision, Cox, Charter, Time Warner Cable, Verizon FiOS and AT&T U-Verse.

Ultimately, Bornstein would bring the league's internet and mobile assets in-house and help build NFL Media into a collection of league-owned media assets including NFL Network, NFL.com, NFL Mobile, NFL RedZone, NFL Now, and NFL Films along with the NFL's social media platforms.

While building out and growing the NFL's own media assets, Bornstein reconfigured and repackaged the NFL's television assets and helped the league bring NBC back into the fold, move Monday Night Football to ESPN, introduced flexible scheduling, and created a new package of Thursday primetime games for NFL Network which introduced the modernized version of Thursday Night Football. What started as an eight-game, cable-only schedule, Thursday Night Football has expanded to a staple in the NFL calendar, with Amazon Prime taking over the primetime package in 2021. Bornstein was instrumental in the December 2011 landmark nine-year extensions with CBS, FOX and NBC which continue the NFL's tradition on broadcast television through the 2022 season. Those new deals came just three months after he helped secure an eight-year agreement to keep Monday Night Football on ESPN until 2021.

Bornstein also helped lead renewal negotiations in 2014 with DirecTV for exclusive rights to carry NFL Sunday Ticket and its package of every Sunday afternoon out-of-market game through a new multi-year agreement. The 2014 renewal also expanded DirecTV's rights to stream NFL Sunday Ticket live on mobile devices and via broadband, known as NFL Sunday Ticket TV.

In October 2013, Bornstein was succeeded by Brian Rolapp as CEO of NFL Network.

=== Charitable activities ===
Bornstein takes part in numerous charitable activities with a wide range of organizations. He is the founder and current board chair of The V Foundation, one of the nation's cancer research funding organizations, which has raised more than $125 million for cancer research in the name of late college basketball coach Jim Valvano. In addition, he has served on the President's Council on Physical Fitness and Sports and the California Governor's Council on Physical Fitness, the National Cable Television Association, Hampton University, Steamboat Ventures, and Infoseek.

=== Activision Blizzard ===
In October 2021 the video game publisher Activision Blizzard announced the establishment of a new esports competitive video game division headed by Chairman Steve Bornstein and Senior Vice President Mike Sespo of Major League Gaming.

== Personal life ==
Bornstein lives in Los Angeles with his wife Carol. He has four children.
