= 2022 Open Championship =

Golf tournament

150th Open Championship

Tournament information
- Dates: 14–17 July 2022
- Location: St Andrews, Scotland; 56.343°N 2.803°W
- Course: Old Course
- Organized by: The R&A
- Tours: European Tour; PGA Tour; Japan Golf Tour

Statistics
- Par: 72
- Length: 7,297 yd (6,672 m)
- Field: 156 players, 83 after cut
- Cut: 144 (E)
- Prize fund: $14,000,000
- Winner's share: $2,500,000

Champion
- (Australia) Cameron Smith
- 268 (−20)
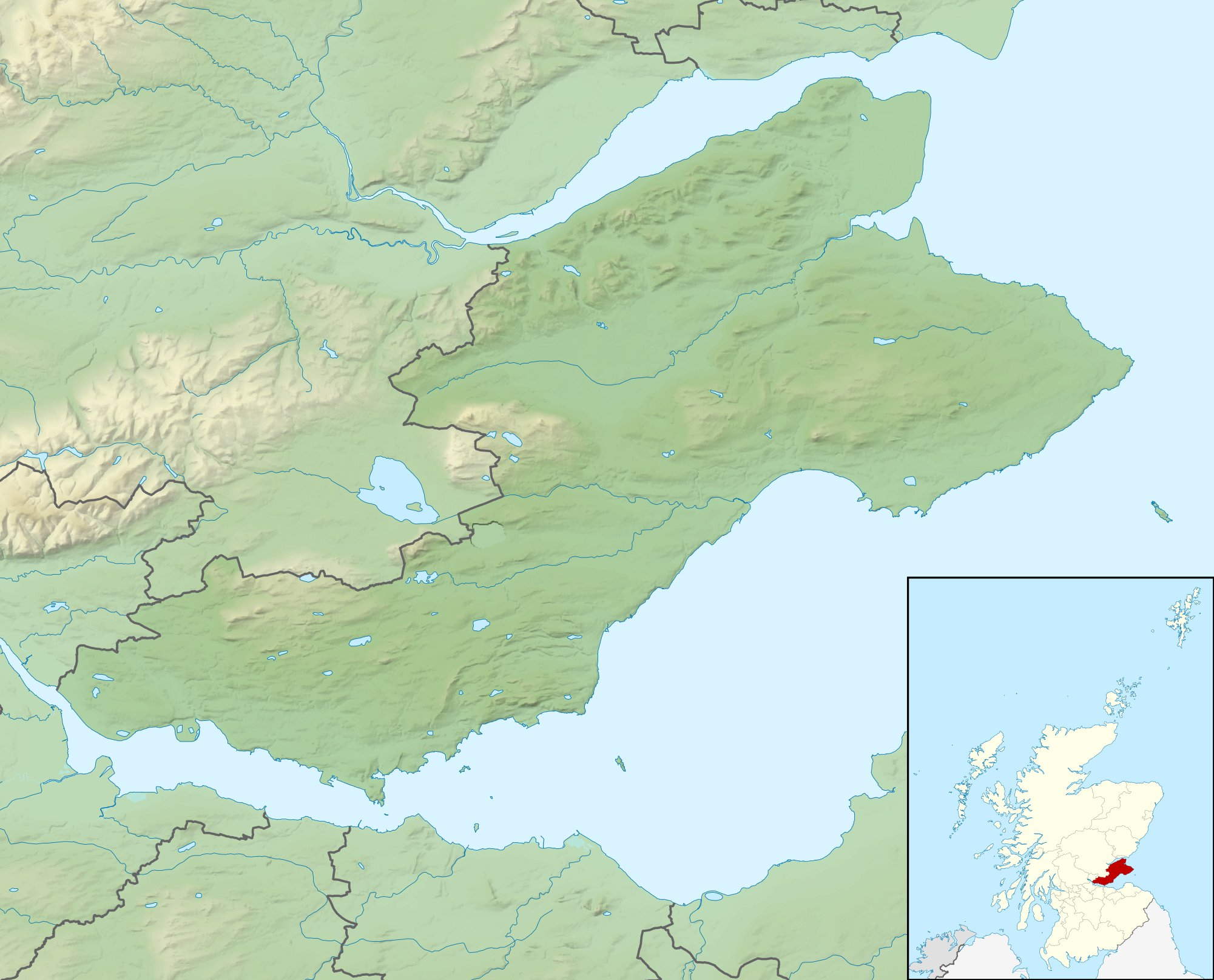
- Location in the United Kingdom Location in Scotland Location in Fife

The 2022 Open Championship, officially the 150th Open Championship, was a golf tournament played 14–17 July on the Old Course at St Andrews, Scotland. The championship was won by Cameron Smith with a score of 268, 20 under par, one stroke ahead of Cameron Young.

Originally scheduled for 15–18 July 2021, the championship was put back one year after the 2020 event was cancelled due to the COVID-19 pandemic, ensuring that the sesquicentennial celebration was at the "home of golf".

== Organisation ==
The Open Championship is organised by the R&A, and is included in the PGA Tour, European Tour, and Japan Golf Tour calendars under the major championships category. The tournament is a 72-hole (4 rounds) stroke play competition held over 4 days, with 18 holes played each day. Play is in groups of three for the first two days, and groups of two in the final two days. Groupings for the first two days are decided by the organisers, with each group having one morning, and one afternoon tee time. On the final two days, players tee off in reverse order of aggregate score, with the leaders last. After 36 holes there was a cut, after which the top 70 and ties progress through to compete in the third and fourth rounds. In the event of a tie for the lowest score after four rounds, a four-hole aggregate playoff will be held to determine the winner; this will be followed by sudden-death extra holes if necessary until a winner emerges.

== Venue ==
The 2022 event was the 30th Open Championship played at the Old Course at St Andrews. The most recent was in 2015, when Zach Johnson won the four-hole playoff for his second major title.

Hole	Name	Yards	Par	Hole	Name	Yards	Par
1	Burn	375	4	10	Bobby Jones	386	4
2	Dyke	452	4	11	High (In)	174	3
3	Cartgate (Out)	398	4	12	Heathery (In)	348	4
4	Ginger Beer	480	4	13	Hole O'Cross (In)	465	4
5	Hole O'Cross (Out)	570	5	14	Long	614	5
6	Heathery (Out)	414	4	15	Cartgate (In)	455	4
7	High (Out)	371	4	16	Corner of the Dyke	418	4
8	Short	174	3	17	Road	495	4
9	End	352	4	18	Tom Morris	356	4
Out		3,586	36	In		3,711	36
Source:				Total		7,297	72

Previous lengths of the course for The Open Championship (since 1950):

- 2015: 7,297 yards (6,672 m)
- 2010: 7,305 yards (6,680 m)
- 2005: 7,279 yards (6,656 m)
- 2000: 7,115 yards (6,506 m)
- 1995: 6,933 yards (6,340 m)
- 1990: 6,933 yards (6,340 m)
- 1984: 6,933 yards (6,340 m)
- 1978: 6,933 yards (6,340 m)
- 1970: 6,957 yards (6,361 m)
- 1964: 6,926 yards (6,333 m)
- 1960: 6,936 yards (6,342 m)
- 1955: 6,936 yards (6,342 m)

== Field ==
The Open Championship field is made up of 156 players, who gained entry through various exemption criteria and qualifying tournaments. The criteria included past Open champions, recent major winners, top ranked players in the world rankings and from the leading world tours, and winners and high finishers from various designated tournaments, including the Open Qualifying Series; the winners of designated amateur events, including The Amateur Championship and U.S. Amateur, also gained exemption provided they remain an amateur. Anyone not qualifying via exemption, and had a handicap of 0.4 or lower, can gain entry through regional and final qualifying events.

=== Criteria and exemptions ===
Each player is classified according to the first category in which he qualified, but other categories are shown in parentheses.

1. The Open Champions aged 60 or under on 17 July 2022

- Mark Calcavecchia (Note: Calcavecchia was 62 years old, but was given an exemption into the event following cancellation of the 2020 event and injury in 2021.)
- Stewart Cink (12)
- Darren Clarke (2)
- John Daly
- David Duval
- Ernie Els (2)
- Pádraig Harrington
- Zach Johnson (2)
- Paul Lawrie
- Shane Lowry (2,4,5,15)
- Rory McIlroy (2,4,5,11,12,15)
- Phil Mickelson (2,10)
- Francesco Molinari (2,6)
- Collin Morikawa (2,3,4,5,10,12,15)
- Louis Oosthuizen (3,4,12)
- Jordan Spieth (2,3,4,12,15)
- Henrik Stenson (2)
- Tiger Woods (9)
- Ben Curtis, Todd Hamilton, and Justin Leonard did not play.

2. The Open Champions for 2011–2021

3. Top 10 finishers and ties in the 2021 Open Championship

- Dylan Frittelli
- Mackenzie Hughes
- Dustin Johnson (4,9,12,15)
- Brooks Koepka (4,8,10,12,15)
- Robert MacIntyre (5)
- Jon Rahm (4,5,8,12,15)
- Scottie Scheffler (4,9,12,15)
- Daniel Berger (4,12,15) did not play. (Note: Daniel Berger withdrew due to a back injury; he was replaced by Sahith Theegala.)

4. Top 50 players in the Official World Golf Ranking (OWGR) for Week 21, 2022

- Abraham Ancer (5,12)
- Keegan Bradley
- Sam Burns (12)
- Patrick Cantlay (12,15)
- Paul Casey (5,15)
- Corey Conners (12)
- Bryson DeChambeau (8,12,15)
- Harris English (12,15)
- Tony Finau (12,15)
- Matt Fitzpatrick (5,8,15)
- Tommy Fleetwood (5,15)
- Talor Gooch (OQS)
- Tyrrell Hatton (5,6,15)
- Russell Henley
- Lucas Herbert (5)
- Tom Hoge
- Max Homa
- Billy Horschel (5,6,12)
- Viktor Hovland (5,12,15)
- Im Sung-jae (12)
- Kevin Kisner
- Jason Kokrak (12)
- Lee Kyoung-hoon
- Marc Leishman
- Hideki Matsuyama (9,12)
- Kevin Na (12)
- Joaquín Niemann (12)
- Mito Pereira
- Thomas Pieters (5)
- Séamus Power
- Patrick Reed (9,12)
- Xander Schauffele (12,15)
- Adam Scott
- Webb Simpson
- Cameron Smith (11,12)
- Justin Thomas (10,11,12,15)
- Cameron Tringale
- Harold Varner III
- Cameron Young
- Will Zalatoris (5)

5. Top 30 in the final 2021 Race to Dubai standings

- Alexander Björk
- Richard Bland
- Dean Burmester
- Laurie Canter
- Thomas Detry
- Justin Harding
- Garrick Higgo
- Nicolai Højgaard
- Min Woo Lee
- Guido Migliozzi
- Ian Poulter (15)
- Jason Scrivener
- Bernd Wiesberger (15)
- Danny Willett (6)
- Justin Rose did not play. (Note: Justin Rose withdrew shortly before his scheduled first round tee time due to a back injury; he was replaced by Rikuya Hoshino (first reserve Alex Norén (67) was unavailable, not having travelled to Scotland).)

6. Recent winners of the BMW PGA Championship (2018–2021)

7. Top five players, not already exempt, within the top 20 of the 2022 DP World Tour Rankings through the BMW International Open

- Adri Arnaus
- Sam Horsfield
- Pablo Larrazábal
- Li Haotong
- Jordan Smith

8. Recent winners of the U.S. Open (2017–2022)

- Gary Woodland

9. Recent winners of the Masters Tournament (2017–2022)

- Sergio García (12,15)

10. Recent winners of the PGA Championship (2016–2022)

- Jimmy Walker did not play.

11. Recent winners of the Players Championship (2019–2022)

12. The top 30 players from the 2021 FedEx Cup Playoffs

- Erik van Rooyen did not play. (Note: Erik van Rooyen withdrew before his tee time due to a neck injury; he was replaced by Aaron Rai.)

13. Top five players, not already exempt, within the top 20 of the 2021–22 FedEx Cup points list through the Travelers Championship (Note: All players in the top 20 were already qualified.)

14. Winner of the 2021 Visa Open de Argentina

- Jorge Fernández-Valdés

15. Playing members of the 2021 Ryder Cup teams

- Lee Westwood

16. Winner of the 2021–22 PGA Tour of Australasia Order of Merit

- Jediah Morgan

17. Winner of the 2021–22 Sunshine Tour Order of Merit

- Shaun Norris (18)

18. Winner of the 2021 Japan Open Golf Championship

19. Winner of the 2022 Asia Pacific Open Golf Championship Diamond Cup

- Shugo Imahira

20. Top two players on the 2020–21 Japan Golf Tour Official Money List

- Takumi Kanaya
- Chan Kim

21. The top player, not already exempt, on the 2022 Japan Golf Tour Official Money List through the Japan Golf Tour Championship

- Kazuki Higa

22. Winner of the 2021 Senior Open Championship

- Stephen Dodd

23. Winner of the 2022 Amateur Championship

- Aldrich Potgieter (a)

24. Winner of the 2021 U.S. Amateur

- ~~James Piot~~ (Note: Exemption forfeited by turning professional.)

25. Winner of the 2022 European Amateur

- Filippo Celli (a)

26. Recipient of the 2021 Mark H. McCormack Medal

- Keita Nakajima (a) (27)

27. Winner of the 2021 Asia-Pacific Amateur Championship

28. Winner of the 2022 Latin America Amateur Championship

- Aaron Jarvis (a)

==== Open Qualifying Series ====
The Open Qualifying Series for the 2022 Open Championship consists of 12 events. Places are available to the leading players (not otherwise exempt) who finished in the top n and ties. In the event of ties, positions went to players ranked highest according to that week's OWGR.

Location	Tournament	Date	Spots	Top	Qualifiers
South Africa	Joburg Open	28 Nov 2021	3	10	Ashley Chesters, Thriston Lawrence, Zander Lombard
Singapore	SMBC Singapore Open	23 Jan 2022	4	12	Sadom Kaewkanjana, Yuto Katsuragawa, Tom Kim, Sihwan Kim
Australia	Vic Open	13 Feb 2022	3	10	Ben Campbell, Matthew Griffin, Dimitrios Papadatos
United States	Arnold Palmer Invitational	6 Mar 2022	3 (Note: Only two players in the top ten were not already qualified.)	10	Talor Gooch (4), Chris Kirk
Japan	Gateway to The Open Mizuno Open	29 May 2022	4	12	Justin De Los Santos, Brad Kennedy, Anthony Quayle, Scott Vincent
Netherlands	Dutch Open	29 May 2022	3	10	Ryan Fox, Adrian Meronk, Victor Perez
Canada	RBC Canadian Open	12 Jun 2022	2	8	Wyndham Clark, Keith Mitchell
Korea	Kolon Korea Open	26 Jun 2022	2	8	Cho Min-gyu, Kim Min-kyu
Ireland	Horizon Irish Open	3 Jul 2022	3	10	John Catlin, David Law, Fabrizio Zanotti
United States	John Deere Classic	3 Jul 2022	3	10	Christiaan Bezuidenhout, Emiliano Grillo, J. T. Poston
Scotland	Genesis Scottish Open	10 Jul 2022	3	10	Jamie Donaldson, Kurt Kitayama, Brandon Wu
United States	Barbasol Championship	10 Jul 2022	1	5	Trey Mullinax

==== Final Qualifying ====
Final Qualifying events were played on 28 June at four locations. Four qualifying places were available at each location, with 72 golfers competing at each.

Location	Qualifiers
Fairmont St Andrews	David Carey, Robert Dinwiddie, Lars van Meijel, Alex Wrigley
Hollinwell	Barclay Brown (a), Oliver Farr, Richard Mansell, Marco Penge
Prince's	Jack Floydd, Matt Ford, Ronan Mullarney, Jamie Rutherford
St Annes Old Links	Marcus Armitage, Sam Bairstow (a), Matthew Jordan, John Parry

=== Additional players added to the field ===
In order to fill additional places or replace exempt players who had withdrawn prior to the start of the Championship, and maintain the full field of 156, additional players were either taken in ranking order from Official World Golf Ranking at the time they were added, or from Final Qualifying.

From the Week 26 (26 June) Official World Golf Ranking:

- Aaron Wise (ranked 45)
- Brian Harman (49)
- Sebastián Muñoz (50)
- Sepp Straka (55)
- Luke List (60)
- Kim Si-woo (62)

From the Week 27 (3 July) Official World Golf Ranking:

- Sahith Theegala (62)
- Rikuya Hoshino (71)
- Aaron Rai (127)

== Round summaries ==
=== First round ===
Thursday, 14 July 2022

PGA Tour rookie Cameron Young had a two-shot lead after a bogey-free round of 8 under par, two shots ahead of pre-tournament favourite Rory McIlroy. Defending champion Collin Morikawa opened with a level-par 72 while three-time winner Tiger Woods double-bogeyed the first and continued to struggle there on, finishing at 6 over.

Place	Player	Score	To par
1	(United States) Cameron Young	64	−8
2	(Northern Ireland) Rory McIlroy	66	−6
T3	(England) Robert Dinwiddie	67	−5
T3	(Australia) Cameron Smith	67	−5
T5	(England) Barclay Brown (a)	68	−4
T5	(United States) Talor Gooch	68	−4
T5	(Norway) Viktor Hovland	68	−4
T5	(United States) Dustin Johnson	68	−4
T5	(Australia) Brad Kennedy	68	−4
T5	(United States) Kurt Kitayama	68	−4
T5	(United States) Scottie Scheffler	68	−4
T5	(England) Lee Westwood	68	−4

=== Second round ===
Friday, 15 July 2022

Cameron Smith took the lead on a score of 131, the lowest 36-hole score in Open Championship history at St. Andrews. Cameron Young fell to second place, two strokes behind, after a second-round 69. Viktor Hovland and Rory McIlroy were a further stroke behind in a tie for third place. 83 players made the cut of level par, including four amateurs. Defending champion Collin Morikawa missed the cut by a stroke.

Place	Player	Score	To par
1	(Australia) Cameron Smith	67-64=131	−13
2	(United States) Cameron Young	64-69=133	−11
T3	(Norway) Viktor Hovland	68-66=134	−10
T3	(Northern Ireland) Rory McIlroy	66-68=134	−10
5	(United States) Dustin Johnson	68-67=135	−9
T6	(England) Tyrrell Hatton	70-66=136	−8
T6	(United States) Scottie Scheffler	68-68=136	−8
T8	(United States) Patrick Cantlay	70-67=137	−7
T8	(United States) Talor Gooch	68-69=137	−7
T8	(Australia) Adam Scott	72-65=137	−7
T8	(United States) Sahith Theegala	69-68=137	−7

=== Third round ===
Saturday, 16 July 2022

Viktor Hovland and Rory McIlroy each shot rounds of 66 to tie for first after the third round at −16. Cameron Smith, who shot 73, and Cameron Young, who shot 71, dropped back to four strokes behind at −12. McIlroy was trying for his second Open title and first major victory in eight years while Hovland was looking for his first major.

Place	Player	Score	To par
T1	(Norway) Viktor Hovland	68-66-66=200	−16
T1	(Northern Ireland) Rory McIlroy	66-68-66=200	−16
T3	(Australia) Cameron Smith	67-64-73=204	−12
T3	(United States) Cameron Young	64-69-71=204	−12
T5	(South Korea) Kim Si-woo	69-69-67=205	−11
T5	(United States) Scottie Scheffler	68-68-69=205	−11
7	(United States) Dustin Johnson	68-67-71=206	−10
T8	(England) Matt Fitzpatrick	72-66-69=207	−9
T8	(England) Tommy Fleetwood	72-69-66=207	−9
T8	(Australia) Adam Scott	72-65-70=207	−9

=== Final round ===
Sunday, 17 July 2022

==== Summary ====
Cameron Smith came from four strokes behind to win the Open. He made eight birdies in his round of 64, which was joint low round of the tournament, and was the lowest final round score by a champion at St Andrews. Cameron Young made an eagle on the final hole to finish one stroke back. Rory McIlroy, third round co-leader, managed only two birdies in his round and finished a further stroke behind. Viktor Hovland, the other third round co-leader, shot a two-over-par 74 to finish tied for fourth with Tommy Fleetwood. Smith's total of 20 under par tied the to-par record in a major, last reached by Dustin Johnson at the 2020 Masters Tournament.

==== Final leaderboard ====
Champion
Silver Medal winner (low amateur)
(a) = amateur
(c) = past champion

Top 10
Place	Player	Score	To par	Money ($)
1	(Australia) Cameron Smith	67-64-73-64=268	−20	2,500,000
2	(United States) Cameron Young	64-69-71-65=269	−19	1,455,000
3	(Northern Ireland) Rory McIlroy (c)	66-68-66-70=270	−18	933,000
T4	(England) Tommy Fleetwood	72-69-66-67=274	−14	654,000
T4	(Norway) Viktor Hovland	68-66-66-74=274	−14	654,000
T6	(United States) Brian Harman	73-68-68-66=275	−13	465,900
T6	(United States) Dustin Johnson	68-67-71-69=275	−13	465,900
T8	(United States) Patrick Cantlay	70-67-71-68=276	−12	325,667
T8	(United States) Bryson DeChambeau	69-74-67-66=276	−12	325,667
T8	(United States) Jordan Spieth (c)	71-69-68-68=276	−12	325,667

Leaderboard below the top 10
Place	Player	Score	To par	Money ($)
T11	(Mexico) Abraham Ancer	71-68-73-65=277	−11	231,000
T11	(South Africa) Dean Burmester	71-73-67-66=277	−11	231,000
T11	(England) Tyrrell Hatton	70-66-73-68=277	−11	231,000
T11	(Thailand) Sadom Kaewkanjana	71-67-74-65=277	−11	231,000
T15	(Australia) Lucas Herbert	70-68-73-67=278	−10	165,583
T15	(South Korea) Kim Si-woo	69-69-67-73=278	−10	165,583
T15	(Italy) Francesco Molinari (c)	73-71-66-68=278	−10	165,583
T15	(Australia) Anthony Quayle	74-69-68-67=278	−10	165,583
T15	(United States) Xander Schauffele	69-70-72-67=278	−10	165,583
T15	(Australia) Adam Scott	72-65-70-71=278	−10	165,583
T21	(England) Matt Fitzpatrick	72-66-69-72=279	−9	120,286
T21	(United States) Billy Horschel	73-69-70-67=279	−9	120,286
T21	(United States) Kevin Kisner	74-70-65-70=279	−9	120,286
T21	(Australia) Min Woo Lee	69-69-73-68=279	−9	120,286
T21	(Republic of Ireland) Shane Lowry (c)	72-68-69-70=279	−9	120,286
T21	(United States) Trey Mullinax	71-73-66-69=279	−9	120,286
T21	(United States) Scottie Scheffler	68-68-69-74=279	−9	120,286
T28	(Canada) Corey Conners	71-71-71-67=280	−8	90,917
T28	(United States) Tony Finau	73-71-70-66=280	−8	90,917
T28	(South Africa) Dylan Frittelli	70-71-69-70=280	−8	90,917
T28	(Belgium) Thomas Pieters	75-67-67-71=280	−8	90,917
T28	(United States) Harold Varner III	73-67-72-68=280	−8	90,917
T28	(United States) Will Zalatoris	73-67-71-69=280	−8	90,917
T34	(Belgium) Thomas Detry	70-69-74-68=281	−7	68,906
T34	(United States) Talor Gooch	68-69-75-69=281	−7	68,906
T34	(Scotland) Robert MacIntyre	70-74-69-68=281	−7	68,906
T34	(France) Victor Perez	71-69-71-70=281	−7	68,906
T34	(Spain) Jon Rahm	73-67-71-70=281	−7	68,906
T34	(United States) Sahith Theegala	69-68-74-70=281	−7	68,906
T34	(England) Lee Westwood	68-71-73-69=281	−7	68,906
T34	(United States) Aaron Wise	72-67-71-71=281	−7	68,906
T42	(United States) Sam Burns	72-69-77-64=282	−6	51,000
T42	(United States) Chris Kirk	75-68-69-70=282	−6	51,000
T42	(United States) Jason Kokrak	72-70-72-68=282	−6	51,000
T42	(South Africa) Thriston Lawrence	69-71-73-69=282	−6	51,000
T42	(Poland) Adrian Meronk	75-68-70-69=282	−6	51,000
T47	(Italy) Filippo Celli (a)	74-67-71-71=283	−5	
T47	(South Africa) Garrick Higgo	72-69-76-66=283	−5	40,600
T47	(Japan) Yuto Katsuragawa	71-68-75-69=283	−5	40,600
T47	(South Korea) Tom Kim	69-71-72-71=283	−5	40,600
T47	(United States) Patrick Reed	72-68-76-67=283	−5	40,600
T47	(England) Jordan Smith	73-71-72-67=283	−5	40,600
T53	(England) Paul Casey	71-72-71-70=284	−4	35,656
T53	(England) Robert Dinwiddie	67-77-71-69=284	−4	35,656
T53	(Denmark) Nicolai Højgaard	73-67-71-73=284	−4	35,656
T53	(Australia) Brad Kennedy	68-72-72-72=284	−4	35,656
T53	(Chile) Joaquín Niemann	69-74-73-68=284	−4	35,656
T53	(United States) Justin Thomas	72-70-72-70=284	−4	35,656
T53	(Australia) Jason Scrivener	72-71-71-70=284	−4	35,656
T53	(Netherlands) Lars van Meijel	74-70-71-69=284	−4	35,656
T53	(England) Danny Willett	69-73-73-69=284	−4	35,656
T62	(Republic of Ireland) David Carey	72-67-73-73=285	−3	33,625
T62	(United States) Russell Henley	70-72-68-75=285	−3	33,625
T62	(Colombia) Sebastián Muñoz	73-71-71-70=285	−3	33,625
T62	(England) John Parry	69-74-70-72=285	−3	33,625
T62	(England) Ian Poulter	69-72-70-74=285	−3	33,625
T62	(United States) Cameron Tringale	71-71-74-69=285	−3	33,625
T68	(South Africa) Christiaan Bezuidenhout	73-71-68-74=286	−2	32,525
T68	(Spain) Sergio García	75-66-72-73=286	−2	32,525
T68	(England) Richard Mansell	73-71-68-74=286	−2	32,525
T68	(Japan) Hideki Matsuyama	71-72-76-67=286	−2	32,525
T72	(United States) Kurt Kitayama	68-73-73-73=287	−1	32,013
T72	(Scotland) David Law	72-69-77-69=287	−1	32,013
T74	(England) Marcus Armitage	71-72-71-74=288	E	31,763
T74	(Philippines) Justin De Los Santos	71-73-70-74=288	E	31,763
T76	(Spain) Adri Arnaus	74-70-73-72=289	+1	31,513
T76	(United States) Wyndham Clark	71-73-76-69=289	+1	31,513
T76	(Cayman Islands) Aaron Jarvis (a)	75-69-72-73=289	+1	
T79	(England) Barclay Brown (a)	68-70-77-75=290	+2	
T79	(England) Laurie Canter	72-70-74-74=290	+2	31,325
T81	(England) Sam Bairstow (a)	72-72-79-69=292	+4	
T81	(South Korea) Im Sung-jae	71-73-74-74=292	+4	31,200
83	(England) Jamie Rutherford	73-70-78-75=296	+8	31,075
CUT	(New Zealand) Ben Campbell	74-71=145	+1	
CUT	(Wales) Jamie Donaldson	76-69=145	+1	
CUT	(South Africa) Ernie Els (c)	70-75=145	+1	
CUT	(South Africa) Justin Harding	74-71=145	+1	
CUT	(United States) Max Homa	73-72=145	+1	
CUT	(Japan) Takumi Kanaya	74-71=145	+1	
CUT	(South Africa) Zander Lombard	77-68=145	+1	
CUT	(United States) Keith Mitchell	76-69=145	+1	
CUT	(United States) Collin Morikawa (c)	72-73=145	+1	
CUT	(South Africa) Louis Oosthuizen (c)	71-74=145	+1	
CUT	(United States) Webb Simpson	71-74=145	+1	
CUT	(Sweden) Henrik Stenson (c)	75-70=145	+1	
CUT	(Zimbabwe) Scott Vincent	69-76=145	+1	
CUT	(United States) Brandon Wu	71-74=145	+1	
CUT	(Sweden) Alexander Björk	75-71=146	+2	
CUT	(England) Richard Bland	78-68=146	+2	
CUT	(New Zealand) Ryan Fox	71-75=146	+2	
CUT	(Australia) Matthew Griffin	74-72=146	+2	
CUT	(Argentina) Emiliano Grillo	78-68=146	+2	
CUT	(England) Matthew Jordan	74-72=146	+2	
CUT	(United States) Chan Kim	74-72=146	+2	
CUT	(South Korea) Lee Kyoung-hoon	69-77=146	+2	
CUT	(United States) J. T. Poston	73-73=146	+2	
CUT	(United States) Keegan Bradley	76-71=147	+3	
CUT	(United States) John Catlin	74-73=147	+3	
CUT	(United States) John Daly (c)	73-74=147	+3	
CUT	(England) Matt Ford	71-76=147	+3	
CUT	(Republic of Ireland) Pádraig Harrington (c)	69-78=147	+3	
CUT	(United States) Zach Johnson (c)	72-75=147	+3	
CUT	(Italy) Guido Migliozzi	73-74=147	+3	
CUT	(Japan) Keita Nakajima (a)	72-75=147	+3	
CUT	(South Africa) Shaun Norris	74-73=147	+3	
CUT	(England) Aaron Rai	75-72=147	+3	
CUT	(England) Ashley Chesters	75-73=148	+4	
CUT	(South Korea) Cho Min-gyu	75-73=148	+4	
CUT	(Japan) Rikuya Hoshino	75-73=148	+4	
CUT	(Canada) Mackenzie Hughes	73-75=148	+4	
CUT	(United States) Brooks Koepka	73-75=148	+4	
CUT	(United States) Kevin Na	72-76=148	+4	
CUT	(Republic of Ireland) Séamus Power	73-75=148	+4	
CUT	(Austria) Bernd Wiesberger	72-76=148	+4	
CUT	(United States) Stewart Cink (c)	78-71=149	+5	
CUT	(Japan) Kazuki Higa	73-76=149	+5	
CUT	(United States) Sihwan Kim	76-73=149	+5	
CUT	(China) Li Haotong	73-76=149	+5	
CUT	(United States) Luke List	76-73=149	+5	
CUT	(United States) Phil Mickelson (c)	72-77=149	+5	
CUT	(England) Marco Penge	76-73=149	+5	
CUT	(Chile) Mito Pereira	75-74=149	+5	
CUT	(Paraguay) Fabrizio Zanotti	72-77=149	+5	
CUT	(United States) Harris English	76-74=150	+6	
CUT	(Wales) Oliver Farr	76-74=150	+6	
CUT	(United States) Tom Hoge	74-76=150	+6	
CUT	(South Korea) Kim Min-kyu	73-77=150	+6	
CUT	(Australia) Marc Leishman	76-74=150	+6	
CUT	(South Africa) Aldrich Potgieter (a)	74-76=150	+6	
CUT	(United States) Gary Woodland	74-76=150	+6	
CUT	(Wales) Stephen Dodd	77-74=151	+7	
CUT	(Argentina) Jorge Fernández-Valdés	74-77=151	+7	
CUT	(Scotland) Paul Lawrie (c)	74-77=151	+7	
CUT	(Republic of Ireland) Ronan Mullarney	73-78=151	+7	
CUT	(Australia) Dimitrios Papadatos	77-74=151	+7	
CUT	(England) Sam Horsfield	76-76=152	+8	
CUT	(Japan) Shugo Imahira	80-72=152	+8	
CUT	(Austria) Sepp Straka	81-72=153	+9	
CUT	(United States) Tiger Woods (c)	78-75=153	+9	
CUT	(Northern Ireland) Darren Clarke (c)	79-75=154	+10	
CUT	(England) Jack Floydd	75-79=154	+10	
CUT	(Australia) Jediah Morgan	79-76=155	+11	
CUT	(England) Alex Wrigley	82-73=155	+11	
CUT	(United States) David Duval (c)	82-74=156	+12	
CUT	(Spain) Pablo Larrazábal	75-81=156	+12	
CUT	(United States) Mark Calcavecchia (c)	83-82=165	+21	

==== Scorecard ====
Final round

Hole	1	2	3	4	5	6	7	8	9	10	11	12	13	14	15	16	17	18
Par	4	4	4	4	5	4	4	3	4	4	3	4	4	5	4	4	4	4
(Australia) Smith	−12	−13	−13	−13	−14	−14	−14	−14	−14	−15	−16	−17	−18	−19	−19	−19	−19	−20
(United States) Young	−11	−11	−12	−13	−14	−14	−15	−15	−14	−15	−15	−15	−16	−17	−17	−17	−17	−19
(Northern Ireland) McIlroy	−16	−16	−16	−16	−17	−17	−17	−17	−17	−18	−18	−18	−18	−18	−18	−18	−18	−18
(Norway) Hovland	−16	−16	−16	−15	−15	−15	−15	−15	−15	−15	−15	−16	−15	−15	−15	−14	−14	−14

Cumulative tournament scores, relative to par

Eagle	Birdie	Bogey
