= Sam Bairstow =

English professional golfer

Personal information
- Full name: Samuel John Acer Bairstow
- Nationality: England
- Born: 12 August 1998 (age 28) Sheffield, England
- Height: 1.85 m (6 ft 1 in)
- Weight: 92 kg (203 lb; 14.5 st)

Career
- Sport: Golf
- Turned professional: 2022
- Current tour: European Tour
- Former tour: Challenge Tour
- Professional wins: 1

Number of wins by tour
- Challenge Tour: 1

Best results in major championships
- Masters Tournament: DNP
- PGA Championship: DNP
- U.S. Open: CUT: 2024, 2025
- The Open Championship: T81: 2022

Samuel John Acer Bairstow (born 12 August 1998) is an English professional golfer who plays on the European Tour. He won the 2023 Farmfoods Scottish Challenge on the Challenge Tour.

== Early life ==
Bairstow was born in Sheffield, England, and started playing golf at the age of 14. His parents, John and Emma still live there and he also has a younger brother, Tomas, who plays rugby union for Rotherham Titans. He plays left-handed and came to represent Hallowes Golf Club, located in Dronfield between Sheffield and Chesterfield.

== Amateur career ==
In 2021, Bairstow won the English Men's Open Amateur Stroke Play Championship for the Brabazon Trophy.

On June 28, 2022, at St Annes Old Links, Bairstow made it through the final qualifying for The 150th Open Championship at St Andrews, his second Open Championship. He eventually made the 36-hole cut and, after a closing round of 69, finished the championship tied 81st, three strokes behind the low amateur of the tournament.

Bairstow reached the final of The 2022 Amateur Championship at Royal Lytham & St Annes, losing 3 and 2 in the 36-hole match to South African Aldrich Potgieter.

His merits helped him to be selected to represent England at the 2022 European Amateur Team Championship at Royal St George's Golf Club in his home country and at the 2022 Eisenhower Trophy, at Le Golf National in France, as well as being on the winning side for Great Britain and Ireland against the Continental Europe team at the 2022 St Andrews Trophy in Slovakia.

In 2022, Bairstow reached a career best of 7th in the World Amateur Golf Ranking.

== Professional career ==
Bairstow turned professional in September 2022, and made his pro debut at the Alfred Dunhill Links Championship on the European Tour.

In August 2023, Bairstow won the Farmfoods Scottish Challenge at Newmachar Golf Club in Aberdeenshire, Scotland. He finished the 2023 Challenge Tour season 18th on the Order-of-Merit, earning an exemption category for the 2024 European Tour.

In March 2024, Bairstow finished third at the Porsche Singapore Classic, after scoring four equal rounds of 68 for a 16-under-par-score of 272, one shot from a playoff with the leaders, earning his biggest prize-check so far with €145,420.

In August 2025, Bairstow was sanctioned for a rule breach after he disqualified himself at the Nexo Championship in Scotland. He was fined £25,000 by the European Tour.

== Amateur wins ==
- 2019 North of England Open Amateur Championship, Hampshire Salver
- 2021 Brabazon Trophy

== Professional wins (1) ==
=== Challenge Tour wins (1) ===
No.	Date	Tournament	Winning score	Margin of victory	Runner-up
1	12 Aug 2023	Farmfoods Scottish Challenge	−15 (70-68-66-65=269)	1 stroke	(France) Romain Wattel

== Results in major championships ==
Tournament	2021	2022	2023	2024	2025	2026
Masters Tournament						
PGA Championship						
U.S. Open				CUT	CUT	
The Open Championship	CUT	T81				CUT

Did not play

CUT = missed the half-way cut
"T" = tied

== Team appearances ==
Amateur

- European Amateur Team Championship (representing England): 2022
- St Andrews Trophy (representing Great Britain and Ireland): 2022 (winners)
- Eisenhower Trophy (representing England): 2022

== See also ==
- 2023 Challenge Tour graduates
