= Brian Rolapp =

American businessman

- Rolapp in 2026
- Born: June 16, 1972 (age 54)
- Education: Brigham Young University, Harvard Business School
- Occupations: Chief Media and Business Officer
- Organization(s): CIBC World Markets, NBC Universal, NFL Network, NFL Media
- Predecessor: Steve Bornstein
- Partner: Cindy Rolapp
- Children: 4

Brian Rolapp (born June 16, 1972) is the chief executive officer of the PGA Tour.

While with the NFL, Rolapp was responsible for the NFL's media businesses including digital media, NFL Network, advertising sales, NFL sponsorships, NFL media assets, television contracts, and digital media rights. Rolapp graduated from Brigham Young University (BYU) with a degree in English and completed a Master of Business Administration at Harvard Business School.

== Professional career ==
Rolapp began as an analyst at CIBC World Markets for their Media and Entertainment Group. In 2000, Rolapp joined NBC Universal as the Director of Business Development in New York City. His concentration included NBC's cable and new media strategies and their acquisition of all properties of Vivendi Universal Entertainment, which include USA Network, Sci-Fi and Trio. After three years with NBC Universal, Rolapp moved to the NFL Network in 2003 where he became the Director of Finance and Strategy. In 2005, he was promoted to Vice President of Media Strategy and Digital Media. In 2007, his title was changed to Senior Vice President. He was promoted to COO of NFL Media in 2011 and in 2014 became the Executive Vice President of NFL Media and the CEO and president of the NFL Network, succeeding Steve Bornstein.

Prior to 2018 Rolapp had been named to the Sports Business Journal’s Forty Under 40 Hall of Fame. He had also been named as a potential successor to NFL Commissioner Roger Goodell.

On June 17, 2025, Rolapp was named PGA Tour CEO.

== Personal life ==
Rolapp lives in Darien, Connecticut, with his wife, Cindy, and their four children. Rolapp grew up outside of Washington, D.C. His father was Rich Rolapp, the long‑time president of the American Horse Council. He is a practicing member of the Church of Jesus Christ of Latter-day Saints. He is a national trustee for the Boys & Girls Clubs of America and a member of the National Advisory Council at the Marriott School of Business at BYU.
