= Cameron Smith (golfer) =

Australian professional golfer (born 1993)

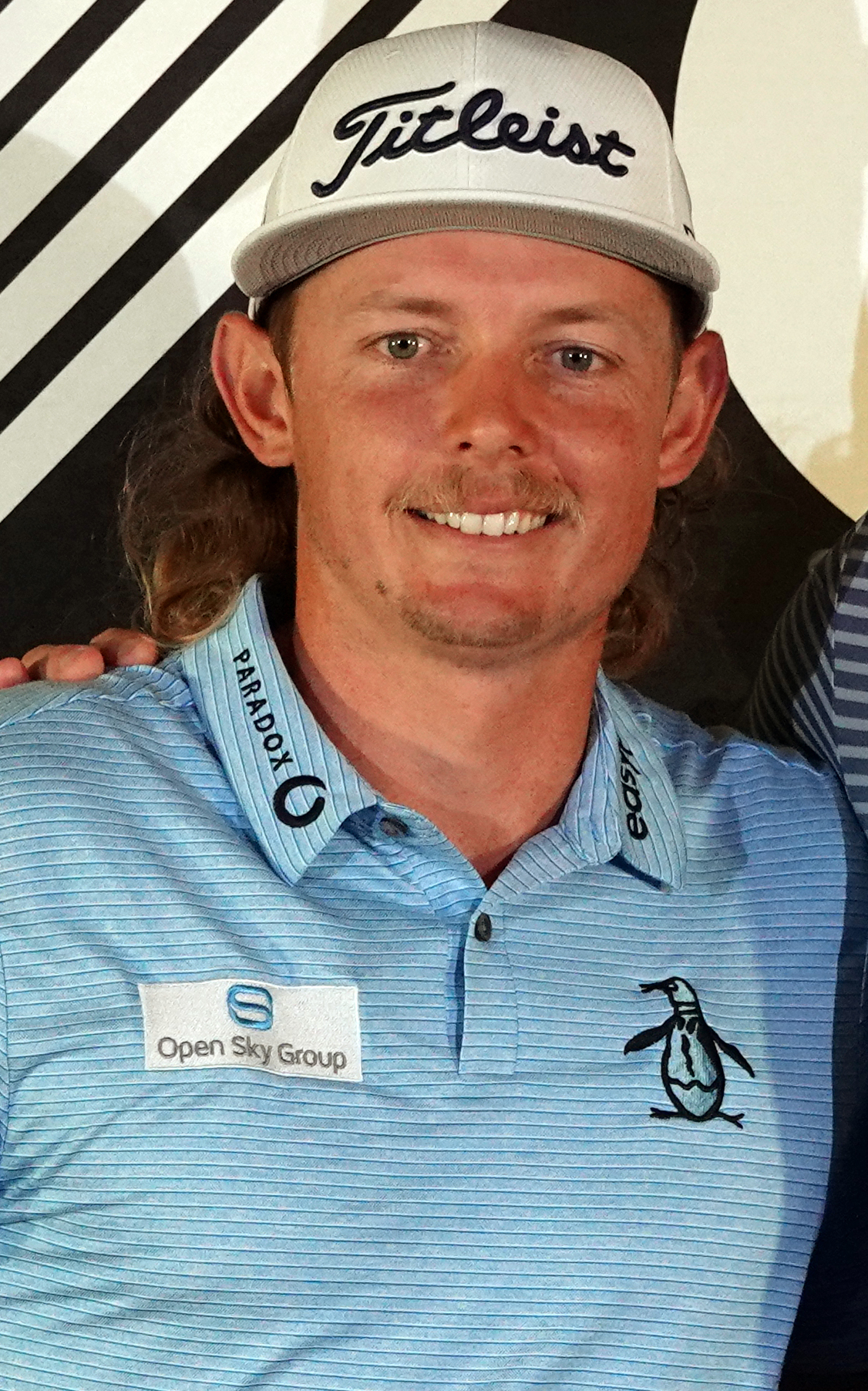
- Smith in 2022

Personal information
- Nationality: Australia
- Born: 18 August 1993 (age 33) Brisbane, Queensland, Australia
- Height: 5 ft 11 in (180 cm)
- Weight: 172 lb (78 kg)
- Spouse: Shanel Naoum (m. 2023)

Career
- Sport: Golf
- Turned professional: 2013
- Current tours: PGA Tour of Australasia; LIV Golf
- Former tours: PGA Tour; Asian Tour
- Professional wins: 12
- Highest ranking: 2 (17 July 2022) (as of 8 November 2026)

Number of wins by tour
- PGA Tour: 6
- European Tour: 4
- PGA Tour of Australasia: 3
- LIV Golf: 3

Best results in major championships (wins: 1)
- Masters Tournament: T2: 2020
- PGA Championship: T7: 2026
- U.S. Open: 4th/T4: 2015, 2023
- The Open Championship: Won: 2022

Achievements and awards
- Asian Tour Rookie of the Year: 2014
- Greg Norman Medal: 2020, 2022
- PGA Player of the Year: 2022

Cameron Smith (born 18 August 1993) is an Australian professional golfer who currently plays on the LIV Golf League. He won the 2022 Open Championship, and has won five other tournaments on the PGA Tour, including the 2022 Players Championship. He has also won the Australian PGA Championship three times.

== Early life ==
Smith was born in Brisbane, Queensland, and grew up in the northern suburb of Bray Park where he attended Pine Rivers State High School throughout his upbringing. As a two-year-old, Smith began playing at Wantima Country Club, a small golf course in the northern suburb of Brisbane while his father Des worked as a printer and was a club captain at the club. Smith's mother, Sharon, worked at the local department store. Smith has a sister, Mel. In 2010, Smith represented Australia in the boys' division of the Trans Tasman Cup alongside Ryan Peake.

== Professional career ==
=== Australasian Tours ===
In 2013, Smith turned professional. He played on the PGA Tour of Australasia. Smith finished tied for second at the 2015 Coca-Cola Queensland PGA Championship and at the 2016 Emirates Australian Open.

Smith played on the Asian Tour in 2014, finishing in the top-10 seven times and finishing 5th on the Order of Merit. His best finish was tied for second at the 2014 CIMB Niaga Indonesian Masters. Smith's first PGA Tour event was the CIMB Classic in October 2014, which was a co-sanctioned event with the Asian Tour; he tied for 5th.

=== PGA Tour ===
In April, Smith tied for 15th in the RBC Heritage, playing on a sponsor's exemption. After qualifying for the 2015 U.S. Open, his top-4 finish earned him an invitation to the 2016 Masters Tournament. The finish also earned Smith Special Temporary Membership on the PGA Tour for the remainder of the 2015 season. Smith earned his 2015–16 PGA Tour card by earning enough as a non-member to have been in the top 125 on the money list: his best three events would have been sufficient.

In 2016 Smith finished 157th in the FedEx points list. His performance in the Web.com Tour Finals, where he was runner-up in the Nationwide Children's Hospital Championship, allowed him to return to the PGA Tour for 2017.

In May 2017, Smith, partnered with Jonas Blixt, won the Zurich Classic of New Orleans, the first team event on the PGA Tour since 1981. The pair did not make a bogey during the tournament and defeated Scott Brown and Kevin Kisner in a playoff. It was Smith's first career PGA Tour win. He had two top-10 finishes on the 2017 PGA Tour, tying for 6th place at the Valero Texas Open and for 7th at the Wyndham Championship and finished 46th in the FedEx Cup standings. He started the new PGA Tour season by tying for 5th place in the CIMB Classic in Malaysia and finishing 3rd in the CJ Cup in South Korea in late 2017. Smith continued his good form by finishing 4th in the Emirates Australian Open and then winning the Australian PGA Championship the following week, beating Jordan Zunic in a playoff.

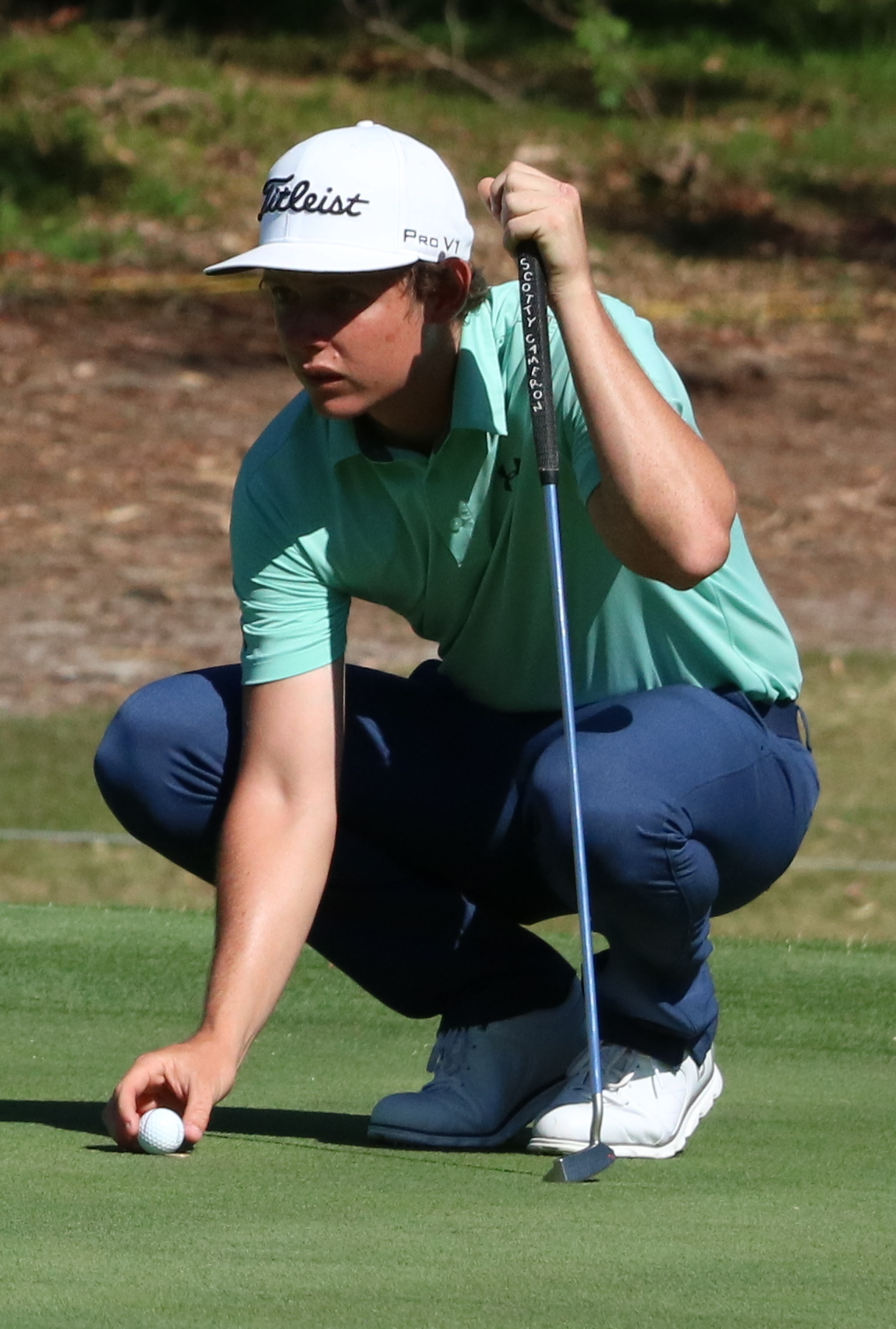
Smith at the 2017 Australian Open

In December 2018, Smith defended his title at the Australian PGA Championship, winning by two strokes over Marc Leishman.

In December 2019, Smith played on the International team at the 2019 Presidents Cup at Royal Melbourne Golf Club in Australia. The U.S. team won 16–14. Smith went 1–1–1 including a win in his Sunday singles match against Justin Thomas.

In January 2020, Smith won the Sony Open in Hawaii in a playoff over Brendan Steele; his first individual victory on the PGA Tour. At the 2020 Masters in November, Smith became the first golfer in Masters history to shoot four rounds in the 60s (67-68-69-69).

In April 2021, Smith won the Zurich Classic of New Orleans for the second time. This time he was partnered with fellow countryman Marc Leishman. The duo won in a playoff over Louis Oosthuizen and Charl Schwartzel.

Smith qualified for the Tokyo 2020 Olympics and competed in the men's competition in July/August 2021. He scored −14 across the four rounds and finished tenth. In spite of shooting 66 in the third and fourth rounds, he was still out of medal contention.

In January, Smith won the 2022 Sentry Tournament of Champions at Kapalua Resort on Maui, Hawaii. Smith shot a PGA Tour record of 34 under par winning by one stroke over world number one Jon Rahm. 34 under par beat the previous mark of 31 under par set by Ernie Els at the same tournament in 2003. In March, Smith won The Players Championship at TPC Sawgrass, becoming the fifth Australian to win the tournament; having hit his second shot on the final hole into the water, Smith managed to get up and down to make a bogey and finish one stroke ahead of Anirban Lahiri.

In July, Smith won his first major championship at the 150th Open Championship, played at the Old Course at St Andrews. He shot a final-round 64 to come from four strokes off the lead and finish one shot ahead of Cameron Young and two ahead of joint third round leader Rory McIlroy. During the FedEx Cup Playoffs in August, he struggled with a hip injury, and did not play in the second event, the BMW Championship. At the end of the PGA Tour season, he won the PGA Player of the Year award. In November, Smith won the Fortinet Australian PGA Championship for the third time.

=== LIV Golf Series ===
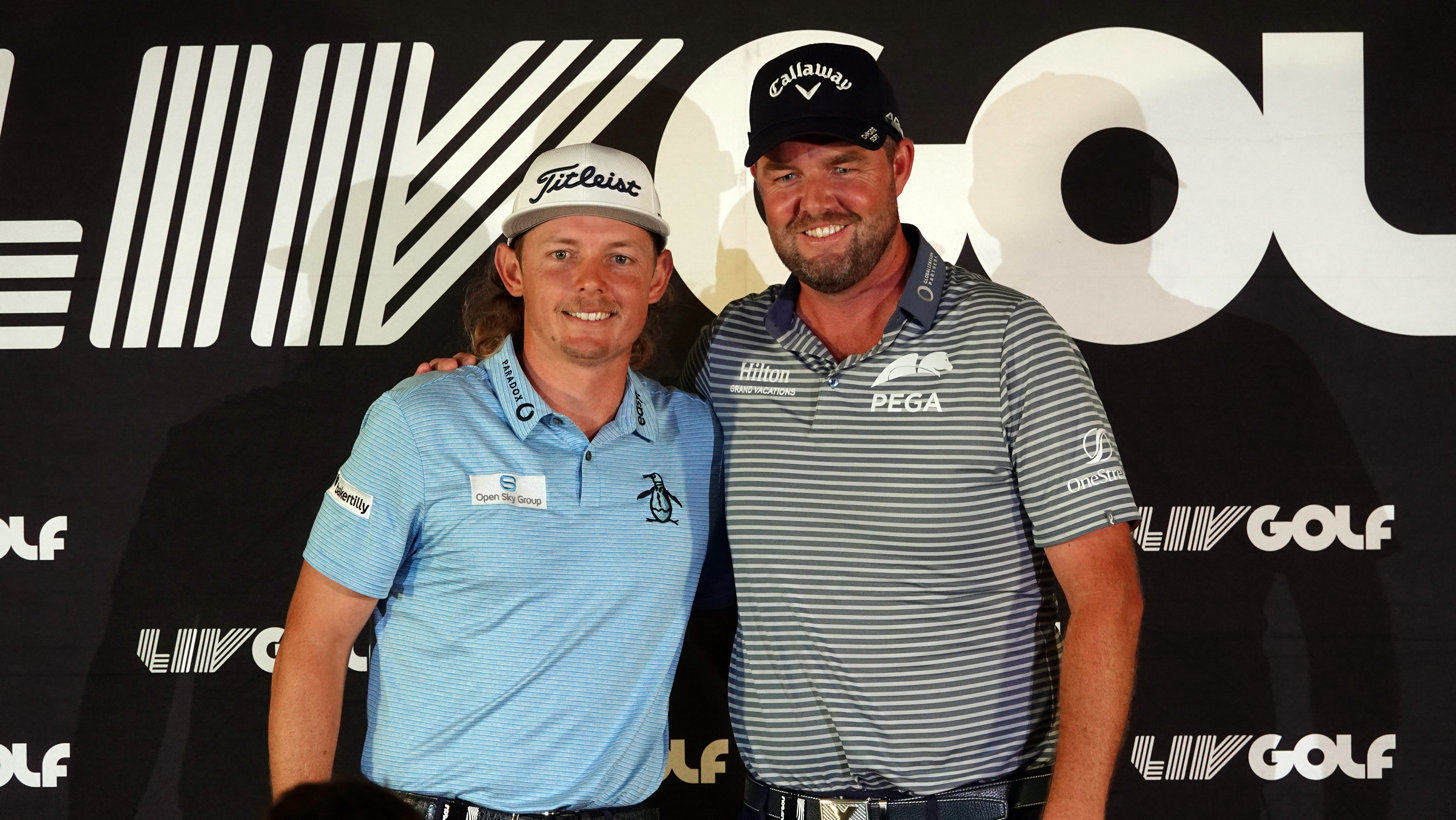
Cameron Smith at his LIV Golf introductory press conference with Marc Leishman, August 2022.

At the end of August 2022, following the Tour Championship, it was announced that Smith had joined LIV Golf. The move had been speculated since The Open, with him repeatedly declining to confirm or deny the rumours.

Smith finished in a tie for 4th in his first LIV start in Boston, with Dustin Johnson winning the 3-man playoff. He won in his second start, scoring rounds of 66, 68 and 69 to finish on 13-under par to win by three shots ahead of previous winner Dustin Johnson and Peter Uihlein. Smith won over $5 million from his first 4 starts on LIV Golf.

== Amateur wins ==
- 2011 Australian Boys' Amateur, Australian Amateur Stroke Play, Victorian Junior Masters
- 2012 Australian Amateur medallist
- 2013 Australian Amateur

== Professional wins (12) ==
=== PGA Tour wins (6) ===
Legend
Major championships (1)
Players Championships (1)
Other PGA Tour (4)

No.	Date	Tournament	Winning score	Margin of victory	Runner(s)-up
1	1 May 2017	Zurich Classic of New Orleans (with (Sweden) Jonas Blixt)	−27 (67-62-68-64=261)	Playoff	(United States) Scott Brown and (United States) Kevin Kisner
2	12 Jan 2020	Sony Open in Hawaii	−11 (70-65-66-68=269)	Playoff	(United States) Brendan Steele
3	25 Apr 2021	Zurich Classic of New Orleans (2) (with (Australia) Marc Leishman)	−20 (63-72-63-70=268)	Playoff	(South Africa) Louis Oosthuizen and (South Africa) Charl Schwartzel
4	9 Jan 2022	Sentry Tournament of Champions	−34 (65-64-64-65=258)	1 stroke	(Spain) Jon Rahm
5	14 Mar 2022	The Players Championship	−13 (69-71-69-66=275)	1 stroke	(India) Anirban Lahiri
6	17 Jul 2022	The Open Championship	−20 (67-64-73-64=268)	1 stroke	(United States) Cameron Young

PGA Tour playoff record (3–1)

No.	Year	Tournament	Opponent(s)	Result
1	2017	Zurich Classic of New Orleans (with (Sweden) Jonas Blixt)	(United States) Scott Brown and (United States) Kevin Kisner	Won with birdie on fourth extra hole
2	2020	Sony Open in Hawaii	(United States) Brendan Steele	Won with par on first extra hole
3	2021	Zurich Classic of New Orleans (with (Australia) Marc Leishman)	(South Africa) Louis Oosthuizen and (South Africa) Charl Schwartzel	Won with par on first extra hole
4	2021	The Northern Trust	(United States) Tony Finau	Lost to par on first extra hole

=== European Tour wins (4) ===
Legend
Major championships (1)
Other European Tour (3)

No.	Date	Tournament	Winning score	Margin of victory	Runner(s)-up
1	3 Dec 2017 (2018 season)	Australian PGA Championship^{1}	−18 (68-67-67-68=270)	Playoff	(Australia) Jordan Zunic
2	2 Dec 2018 (2019 season)	Australian PGA Championship^{1} (2)	−16 (70-65-67-70=272)	2 strokes	(Australia) Marc Leishman
3	17 Jul 2022	The Open Championship	−20 (67-64-73-64=268)	1 stroke	(United States) Cameron Young
4	27 Nov 2022 (2023 season)	Fortinet Australian PGA Championship^{1} (3)	−14 (68-65-69-68=270)	3 strokes	(Japan) Ryo Hisatsune, (Australia) Jason Scrivener

^{1}Co-sanctioned by the PGA Tour of Australasia

European Tour playoff record (1–0)

No.	Year	Tournament	Opponent	Result
1	2017	Australian PGA Championship	(Australia) Jordan Zunic	Won with par on second extra hole

=== PGA Tour of Australasia wins (3) ===
No.	Date	Tournament	Winning score	Margin of victory	Runner(s)-up
1	3 Dec 2017	Australian PGA Championship^{1}	−18 (68-67-67-68=270)	Playoff	(Australia) Jordan Zunic
2	2 Dec 2018	Australian PGA Championship^{1} (2)	−16 (70-65-67-70=272)	2 strokes	(Australia) Marc Leishman
3	27 Nov 2022	Fortinet Australian PGA Championship^{1} (3)	−14 (68-65-69-68=270)	3 strokes	(Japan) Ryo Hisatsune, (Australia) Jason Scrivener

^{1}Co-sanctioned by the European Tour

PGA Tour of Australasia playoff record (1–1)

No.	Year	Tournament	Opponent(s)	Result
1	2016	Emirates Australian Open	(Australia) Ashley Hall, (United States) Jordan Spieth	Spieth won with birdie on first extra hole
2	2017	Australian PGA Championship	(Australia) Jordan Zunic	Won with par on second extra hole

=== LIV Golf League wins (3) ===
No.	Date	Tournament	Winning score	Margin of victory	Runner(s)-up
1	18 Sep 2022	LIV Golf Invitational Chicago	−13 (66-68-69=203)	3 strokes	(United States) Dustin Johnson, (United States) Peter Uihlein
2	9 Jul 2023	LIV Golf London^{1}	−15 (63-67-68=198)	1 stroke	(Australia) Marc Leishman, (United States) Patrick Reed
3	13 Aug 2023	LIV Golf Bedminster^{1}	−12 (66-67-68=201)	7 strokes	(India) Anirban Lahiri

^{1}Co-sanctioned by the MENA Tour

LIV Golf League playoff record (0–2)

No.	Year	Tournament	Opponents	Result
1	2023	LIV Golf Tulsa	(South Africa) Branden Grace, (United States) Dustin Johnson	Johnson won with birdie on first extra hole
2	2024	LIV Golf Hong Kong	(Mexico) Abraham Ancer, (England) Paul Casey	Ancer won with birdie on first extra hole

== Playoff record ==
Asian Tour playoff record (0–1)

No.	Year	Tournament	Opponents	Result
1	2024	PIF Saudi International	(Chile) Joaquín Niemann, (United States) Caleb Surratt	Niemann won with birdie on second extra hole

== Major championships ==
=== Wins (1) ===
Year	Championship	54 holes	Winning score	Margin	Runner-up
2022	The Open Championship	4 shot deficit	−20 (67-64-73-64=268)	1 stroke	(United States) Cameron Young

=== Results timeline ===
Results not in chronological order in 2020.

Tournament	2015	2016	2017	2018
Masters Tournament		T55		T5
U.S. Open	T4	T59		CUT
The Open Championship			CUT	78
PGA Championship	T25		CUT	T56

Tournament	2019	2020	2021	2022	2023	2024	2025	2026
Masters Tournament	T51	T2	T10	T3	T34	T6	CUT	CUT
PGA Championship	T64	T43	T59	T13	T9	T63	CUT	T7
U.S. Open	T72	T38	CUT	CUT	4	T32	CUT	CUT
The Open Championship	T20	NT	T33	1	T33	CUT	CUT	CUT

Win
Top 10
Did not play

CUT = missed the half-way cut
"T" = tied
NT = no tournament due to COVID-19 pandemic

=== Summary ===
Tournament	Wins	2nd	3rd	Top-5	Top-10	Top-25	Events	Cuts made
Masters Tournament	0	1	1	3	5	5	10	8
PGA Championship	0	0	0	0	2	4	11	9
U.S. Open	0	0	0	2	2	2	11	6
The Open Championship	1	0	0	1	1	2	9	5
Totals	1	1	1	6	10	13	41	28

- Most consecutive cuts made – 11 (2018 Open – 2021 PGA)
- Longest streak of top-10s – 2 (twice)

== The Players Championship ==
=== Wins (1) ===
Year	Championship	54 holes	Winning score	Margin	Runner-up
2022	The Players Championship	2 shot deficit	−13 (69-71-69-66=275)	1 stroke	(India) Anirban Lahiri

=== Results timeline ===
Tournament	2017	2018	2019	2020	2021	2022
The Players Championship	CUT	CUT	T56	C	T17	1

Win

CUT = missed the halfway cut
"T" indicates a tie for a place
C = Cancelled after the first round due to the COVID-19 pandemic

== Results in World Golf Championships ==
Tournament	2015	2016	2017	2018	2019	2020	2021
Championship					T6	T22	T11
Match Play				QF	T61	NT^{1}	T28
Invitational				23	T12	T59	T5
Champions	T64			T54	T60	NT^{1}	NT^{1}

^{1}Cancelled due to COVID-19 pandemic

Top 10
Did not play

QF, R16, R32, R64 = Round in which player lost in match play
NT = No tournament
"T" = Tied

== Team appearances ==
Amateur

- Nomura Cup (representing Australia): 2011 (winners)
- Eisenhower Trophy (representing Australia): 2012
- Bonallack Trophy (representing Asia/Pacific): 2012
- Sloan Morpeth Trophy (representing Australia): 2012
- Australian Men's Interstate Teams Matches (representing Queensland): 2010 (winners), 2011 (winners), 2012, 2013 (winners)

Professional

- World Cup (representing Australia): 2018
- Presidents Cup (representing the International team): 2019

== Recognition ==
- 2020 – Greg Norman Medal
- 2022 - Australian Institute of Sport Male Athlete of The Year

== See also ==
- 2016 Web.com Tour Finals graduates
