= Cameron Young =

American professional golfer (born 1997)

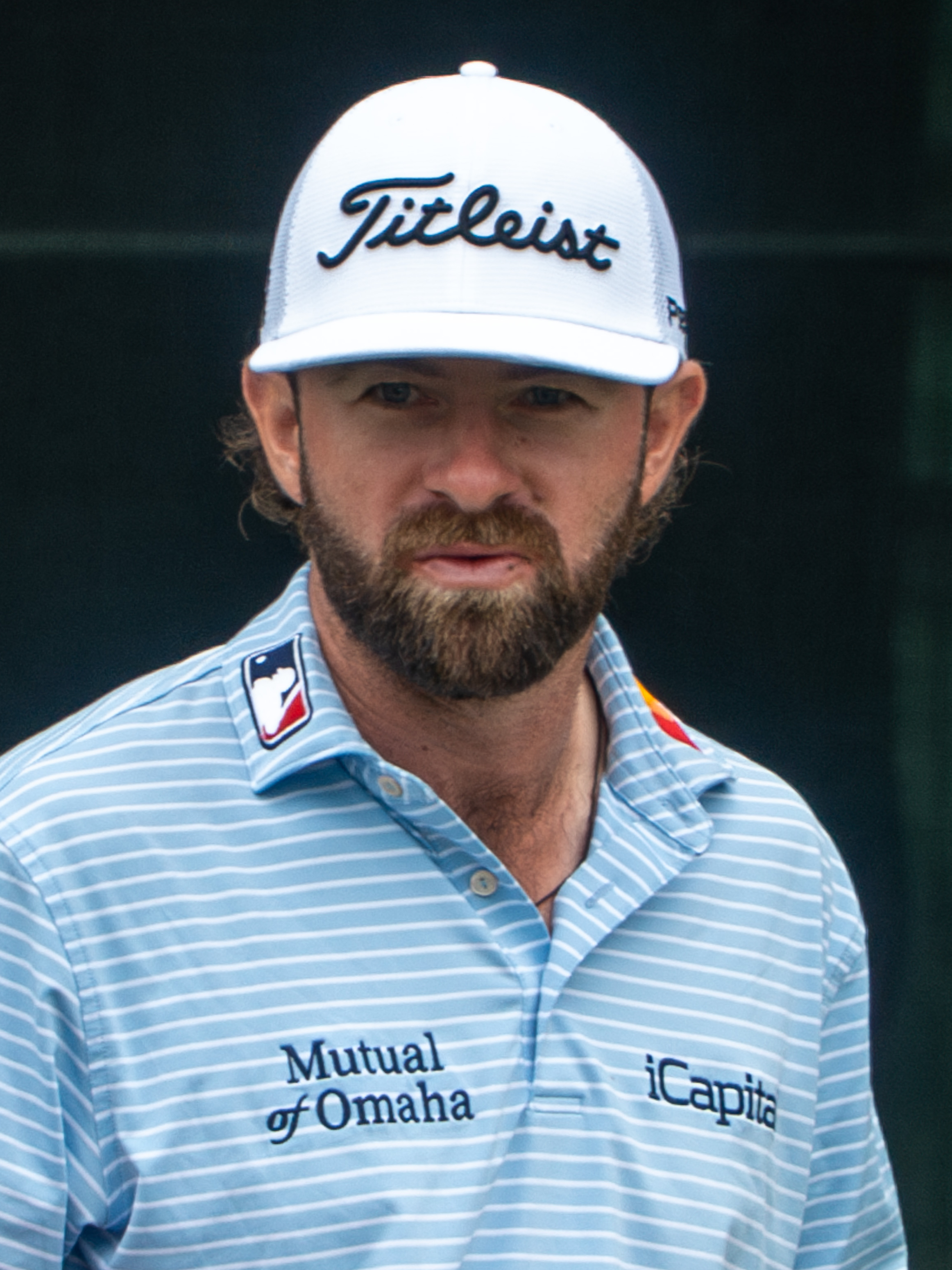
- Young at the 2025 Travelers Championship

Personal information
- Full name: Cameron David Young
- Nationality: United States
- Born: May 7, 1997 (age 29) Scarborough, New York, U.S.
- Height: 5 ft 11 in (180 cm)
- Weight: 185 lb (84 kg)
- Spouse: Kelsey Dalition (m. 2021)
- Children: 3

Career
- Sport: Golf
- College: Wake Forest University
- Turned professional: 2019
- Current tour: PGA Tour
- Former tour: Korn Ferry Tour
- Professional wins: 7
- Highest ranking: 3 (March 22, 2026) (as of October 25, 2026)

Number of wins by tour
- PGA Tour: 3
- Korn Ferry Tour: 2
- Other: 2

Best results in major championships
- Masters Tournament: T3: 2026
- PGA Championship: T3: 2022
- U.S. Open: T4: 2025
- The Open Championship: 2nd: 2022, 2026

Achievements and awards
- PGA Tour Rookie of the Year: 2021–22

Cameron David Young (born May 7, 1997) is an American professional golfer who plays on the PGA Tour, where he has won three titles.

After playing collegiately for Wake Forest University, Young turned professional in 2019. He won twice on the Korn Ferry Tour in 2021 to secure promotion to the PGA Tour. Young was voted PGA Tour Rookie of the Year for the 2021–22 season on the strength of five runner-up finishes, including the 2022 Open Championship. He won his first PGA Tour event in 2025 and his second at the 2026 Players Championship.

== Early life ==
Young was born in Scarborough, New York on May 7, 1997. His father David Young was the head professional at Sleepy Hollow Country Club in Westchester County, New York. His aunt was a golf teaching professional. He attended Fordham Preparatory School in The Bronx, where he was a member of the golf team. At age 15, Young shot a 2-under 70 at James Baird State Park Golf Course to win the Catholic High School Athletic Association New York State Championship.

Young chose to attend Wake Forest University, where he studied Economics, graduating in 2019. He received the Lanny Wadkins Scholarship at Wake Forest. In 2022, Young joked that he was not good enough for the Arnold Palmer Scholarship, which went to Will Zalatoris.

== Amateur career ==
In 2014, Young won the AJGA Polo Golf Junior Classic and was selected to represent the United States in both the Junior Ryder Cup and Junior Golf World Cup. In 2015, during his freshman year at Wake Forest, he won the individual title at the U.S. Collegiate Championship and the Warrior Princeville Makai Invitational; he also reached the second round of the U.S. Amateur, before being knocked out by Jon Rahm. That year, he became the youngest winner of the Metropolitan Golf Association's Ike Stroke Play Championship. He successfully defended the title in 2016.

In 2017, Young became the first amateur to win the Metropolitan PGA's New York State Open, defeating Chris DeForest in a playoff; his 64 (7 under par) in the final round at Bethpage Black tied the course record, until Brooks Koepka shot a 63 in the first round of the 2019 PGA Championship. In 2018, he won the Westchester Open.

During his senior year at Wake Forest in 2019, Young won three tournaments, the General Hackler Invitational, the Augusta Haskins Award Invitational, and was the leading medallist in the Stitch Intercollegiate.

== Professional career ==
=== Korn Ferry Tour ===
Young Monday qualified for the Korn Ferry Tour's Pinnacle Bank Championship in late July 2020 and tied for 11th, giving him entry to the next event; a string of four finishes of 16th or better, culminating with a tie for second at the Nationwide Children's Hospital Championship, earned him enough points to become a special temporary member for the rest of the 2020–21 season. Towards the end of May 2021, he won back-to-back tournaments. He finished the season 19th on the regular-season points list, earning a PGA Tour card for the 2021–22 season.

=== PGA Tour ===
In February 2022, Young tied for second at the Genesis Invitational and rose into the top 100 of the Official World Golf Ranking. In May 2022, Young tied for third at the 2022 PGA Championship. In the 2022 Open Championship, he led the field after the first round with a bogey-free round of 64 (8 under par); in the final round, he eagled the last hole to finish one stroke behind the winner, Cameron Smith. In September 2022, he was selected for the U.S. team in the 2022 Presidents Cup; he won one, tied one and lost two of the four matches he played. With 94% of the vote, he won the PGA Tour Rookie of the Year (Arnold Palmer Award).

In March 2023, Young changed caddies, employing Paul Tesori, who had most recently worked with Webb Simpson. In their first tournament together, Young was runner-up in the WGC-Dell Technologies Match Play; he was defeated 6 and 5 by Sam Burns in the final. The following month he finished in a tie for seventh at the Masters Tournament.

In the third round of the 2024 Travelers Championship, Young shot a 59, which was just the 13th sub-60 round in PGA Tour history.

Hole	1	2	3	4	5	6	7	8	9	10	11	12	13	14	15	16	17	18	Total
Par	4	4	4	4	3	5	4	3	4	4	3	4	5	4	4	3	4	4	70
Score	−1	−2	−4	−5	−5	−5	−5	−6	−7	−7	−7	−7	−8	−8	−10	−10	−11	−11	59

==== 2025: First PGA Tour win, Ryder Cup debut ====
In August 2025, Young won the Wyndham Championship for his first PGA Tour victory after seven runner-up finishes. He became the 1,000th player to win a recognized PGA Tour event, dating to Willie Park, Sr. in the 1860 British Open. He finished at 22-under 258, tying the tournament record held by J. T. Poston (2019) and Henrik Stenson (2017).

Young was selected as a captain's pick at the 2025 Ryder Cup. He was the joint-top scorer for the United States with a 3–1–0 record, including a win in his singles match against Justin Rose, as the United States lost by a score of 15–13.

==== 2026: Players Championship victory ====
At the 2026 Players Championship in March, Young was in second place after 70 holes. He birdied the island green, par-3 17th hole to tie the lead held by Matt Fitzpatrick. Young then hit a 375-yard (343 m) drive on the par-4 18th and hit his approach to 15 feet (4.6 m). Fitzpatrick bogied the hole and Young two-putted to win the title. With the victory, he received $4.5 million and rose to a career-high of 4th in the Official World Golf Ranking.

In the third round of the 2026 Masters Tournament, Young shot a 7-under 65 to move into a tie for first place, alongside 36-hole leader Rory McIlroy. He shot a final-round 73 to finish in a tie for third.

In May, Young recorded his second victory of the season, at the Cadillac Championship. He led wire-to-wire and totaled 19-under 269 at Trump National Doral to win by six shots over Scottie Scheffler.

== Personal life ==
In March 2021, Young married Kelsey Dalition. They had known each other since childhood in Garrison, New York. They had their first child in 2022. As of 2025, they have three children and live in Palm Beach Gardens, Florida.

Young is a Catholic. On the morning of the final round of the 2026 Players Championship, he attended Mass with his family. Young stated: "Our faith is very important to us. It's something that I feel like brings us together. It's very important, I think, for all of us to kind of have that part of our lives be a central portion of what we do, individually and as a family."

Young appeared in the sports documentary series Full Swing, which premiered on Netflix on February 15, 2023.

== Amateur wins ==
- 2015 U.S. Collegiate Championship, Warrior Princeville Makai Invitational, MGA Ike Stroke Play Championship
- 2016 MGA Ike Stroke Play Championship
- 2019 General Hackler Invitational, Augusta Haskins Award Invitational, Stitch Intercollegiate (medallist)

== Professional wins (7) ==
=== PGA Tour wins (3) ===
Legend
Players Championships (1)
Signature events (1)
Other PGA Tour (1)

No.	Date	Tournament	Winning score	To par	Margin of victory	Runner-up
1	Aug 3, 2025	Wyndham Championship	63-62-65-68=258	−22	6 strokes	(United States) Mac Meissner
2	Mar 15, 2026	The Players Championship	68-67-72-68=275	−13	1 stroke	(England) Matt Fitzpatrick
3	May 3, 2026	Cadillac Championship	64-67-70-68=269	−19	6 strokes	(United States) Scottie Scheffler

=== Korn Ferry Tour wins (2) ===
No.	Date	Tournament	Winning score	To par	Margin of victory	Runner-up
1	May 23, 2021	AdventHealth Championship	64-69-68-68=269	−19	2 strokes	(South Africa) Dawie van der Walt
2	May 30, 2021	Evans Scholars Invitational	64-68-67-67=266	−18	5 strokes	(Canada) Adam Svensson

=== Other wins (2) ===
No.	Date	Tournament	Winning score	To par	Margin of victory	Runner-up
1	Jul 20, 2017	Lenox Advisors New York State Open (as an amateur)	70-70-64=204	−9	Playoff	(United States) Chris DeForest
2	Jul 10, 2018	Westchester Open (as an amateur)	63-70-65=198	−12	7 strokes	(United States) David Pastore

Other playoff record (1–0)

No.	Year	Tournament	Opponent	Result
1	2017	Lenox Advisors New York State Open (as an amateur)	(United States) Chris DeForest	Won with birdie on second extra hole

== Results in major championships ==
Results not in chronological order in 2020.

Tournament	2019	2020	2021	2022	2023	2024	2025	2026
Masters Tournament				CUT	T7	T9	CUT	T3
PGA Championship				T3	CUT	T63	T47	T26
U.S. Open	CUT		CUT	CUT	T32	T67	T4	T43
The Open Championship		NT		2	T8	T31	CUT	2

Top 10
Did not play

CUT = missed the half-way cut
"T" indicates a tie for a place
NT = no tournament due to COVID-19 pandemic

=== Summary ===
Tournament	Wins	2nd	3rd	Top-5	Top-10	Top-25	Events	Cuts made
Masters Tournament	0	0	1	1	3	3	5	3
PGA Championship	0	0	1	1	1	1	5	4
U.S. Open	0	0	0	1	1	1	7	4
The Open Championship	0	2	0	2	3	3	5	4
Totals	0	2	2	5	8	8	22	15

- Most consecutive cuts made – 6 (2023 U.S. Open – 2024 Open Championship)
- Longest streak of top-10s – 2 (twice)

== Results in The Players Championship ==
Tournament	2022	2023	2024	2025	2026
The Players Championship	CUT	T51	T54	T61	1

Win

CUT = missed the halfway cut
"T" indicates a tie for a place

== Results in World Golf Championships ==
Tournament	2022	2023
Match Play	T35	2
Champions	NT^{1}	

^{1}Canceled due to the COVID-19 pandemic

Top 10

"T" = Tied
NT = No tournament
Note that the Champions was discontinued from 2023.

== U.S. national team appearances ==
Amateur

- Junior Ryder Cup: 2014 (winners)

Professional

- Presidents Cup: 2022 (winners), 2026 (winners)
- Ryder Cup: 2025

== See also ==
- 2021 Korn Ferry Tour Finals graduates
- Lowest rounds of golf
