= Davis Riley =

American professional golfer (born 1996)

Personal information
- Nationality: United States
- Born: December 17, 1996 (age 29) Hattiesburg, Mississippi, U.S.
- Height: 6 ft 0 in (1.83 m)
- Weight: 175 lb (79 kg; 12.5 st)

Career
- Sport: Golf
- College: Alabama
- Turned professional: 2019
- Current tour: PGA Tour
- Former tour: Korn Ferry Tour
- Professional wins: 4
- Highest ranking: 53 (May 18, 2025) (as of 25 October 2026)

Number of wins by tour
- PGA Tour: 2
- Korn Ferry Tour: 2

Best results in major championships
- Masters Tournament: T21: 2025
- PGA Championship: T2: 2025
- U.S. Open: T31: 2022
- The Open Championship: CUT: 2023, 2025

Davis Riley (born December 17, 1996) is an American professional golfer who plays on the PGA Tour.

== Amateur career ==
Riley was born in Hattiesburg, Mississippi. He attended Presbyterian Christian School in Hattiesburg, winning the Mississippi state title four straight years. In 2015, he was named All-USA Boys Golf Player of the Year by USA Today. Riley made the final of the U.S. Junior Amateur two years in a row, joining Tiger Woods and Jordan Spieth as the only players to appear in the championship match twice. In 2013, he lost the final to Scottie Scheffler, 3 and 2, after calling a penalty on himself on the last hole of the match. He was a member of the American team at the 2014 Junior Ryder Cup that defeated the European team 16–8 in Perthshire, Scotland.

Riley enrolled at Alabama in 2015. He was a Second Team All-SEC as a sophomore and was ranked as the best collegiate player in the country entering his junior year. He played in the Palmer Cup in 2018, compiling a 2–2 record in the American win over the International team.

Riley turned professional in 2019.

== Professional career ==
Riley joined the Korn Ferry Tour in 2020, earning his first win at the Panama Championship in February. He added a second title at the TPC San Antonio Championship in July, finishing the combined 2020-21 Korn Ferry Tour season ninth on the points list to earn his PGA Tour card. While playing the Korn Ferry Tour, Riley was roommates with Will Zalatoris, who had defeated him in the U.S. Junior Amateur final in 2014.

In March 2022, Riley took a two-shot lead into the final round of the Valspar Championship before losing on the second playoff hole to Sam Burns. He finished fourth in the Zurich Classic of New Orleans while partnering with Zalatoris. The following week, he finished in 5th place at the Mexico Open.

Riley has qualified for the U.S. Open three times, missing the cut in 2015 and 2020, but finishing tied-31st in 2023.

In April 2023, Riley earned his first PGA Tour title when he won the Zurich Classic of New Orleans with partner Nick Hardy, at a tournament record score of −30.

In May 2024, Riley won the Charles Schwab Challenge by five strokes for his first individual victory on the PGA Tour.

The following May, a week before defending his title at the Charles Schwab Challenge, Riley entered the final round of the PGA Championship tied for third and four strokes behind Scottie Scheffler. A triple-bogey 8 at the 7th hole at Quail Hollow Club put him tied-17th, but he finished with three birdies and no bogeys to finish tied for second, his best major finish.

== Professional wins (4) ==
=== PGA Tour wins (2) ===
No.	Date	Tournament	Winning score	To par	Margin of victory	Runners-up
1	Apr 23, 2023	Zurich Classic of New Orleans (with (United States) Nick Hardy)	64-66-63-65=258	−30	2 strokes	(Canada) Adam Hadwin and (Canada) Nick Taylor
2	May 26, 2024	Charles Schwab Challenge	66-64-66-70=266	−14	5 strokes	(United States) Keegan Bradley, (United States) Scottie Scheffler

PGA Tour playoff record (0–1)

No.	Year	Tournament	Opponent	Result
1	2022	Valspar Championship	(United States) Sam Burns	Lost to birdie on second extra hole

=== Korn Ferry Tour wins (2) ===
No.	Date	Tournament	Winning score	Margin of victory	Runner(s)-up
1	Feb 2, 2020	Panama Championship	−10 (67-70-64-69=270)	1 stroke	(Mexico) Roberto Díaz
2	Jul 18, 2020	TPC San Antonio Championship	−16 (70-69-66-67=272)	2 strokes	(France) Paul Barjon, (Canada) Taylor Pendrith

== Results in major championships ==
Results not in chronological order before 2020.

Tournament	2015	2016	2017	2018
Masters Tournament				
U.S. Open	CUT			
The Open Championship				
PGA Championship				

Tournament	2019	2020	2021	2022	2023	2024	2025	2026
Masters Tournament							T21	CUT
PGA Championship				T13	CUT		T2	CUT
U.S. Open		CUT		T31			CUT	
The Open Championship		NT			CUT		CUT	

Top 10
Did not play

CUT = missed the half-way cut
"T" = tied
NT = no tournament due to COVID-19 pandemic

=== Summary ===
Tournament	Wins	2nd	3rd	Top-5	Top-10	Top-25	Events	Cuts made
Masters Tournament	0	0	0	0	0	1	2	1
PGA Championship	0	1	0	1	1	2	4	2
U.S. Open	0	0	0	0	0	0	4	1
The Open Championship	0	0	0	0	0	0	2	0
Totals	0	1	0	1	1	3	12	4

- Most consecutive cuts made – 2 (twice)
- Longest streak of top-10s – 1 (once)

== Results in The Players Championship ==
Tournament	2023	2024	2025	2026
The Players Championship	CUT	CUT	T38	CUT

CUT = missed the halfway cut
"T" indicates a tie for a place

== Results in World Golf Championships ==
Tournament	2023
Match Play	T28

"T" = Tied

== U.S. national team appearances ==
Amateur

- Junior Ryder Cup: 2014 (won)
- Palmer Cup: 2018 (won)
