= 2013 U.S. Junior Amateur =

Tournament information
- Dates: July 22–27, 2013
- Location: Truckee, California, U.S.
- Course: Martis Camp
- Organized by: USGA
- Format: Stroke play and match play

Statistics
- Par: 72
- Length: 7,740 yards (7,080 m)
- Field: 156 players

Champion
- (United States) Scottie Scheffler
- def. (United States) Davis Riley, 3&2

The 2013 U.S. Junior Amateur Championship was the 66th U.S. Junior Amateur, a national golf championship organized by the United States Golf Association (USGA) for boy golfers under the age of 18. The tournament was played from July 22–27, 2013, at Martis Camp in Truckee, California near Lake Tahoe. Set up as a par-72 layout measuring 7,740 yards, the Tom Fazio-designed course was the longest configuration in the championship's history up to that time.

From an initial pool of 2,860 entries, a final field of 156 players competed in a 36-hole stroke play qualifier, with the top 64 advancing to a single-elimination match play bracket. Past champion Jim Liu earned medalist honors in the stroke play portion with an 8-under par 136. The 2013 field became highly notable for its concentration of future PGA Tour professionals, including Cameron Young, Maverick McNealy, Sam Burns, Sahith Theegala, Ben Griffin, and Doug Ghim.

Future world number one Scottie Scheffler won the championship, defeating Davis Riley, 3 and 2, in the 36-hole final match. Riley held a 2-up lead through 27 holes before Scheffler mounted a late-afternoon rally, winning four consecutive holes. The match concluded on the 34th hole of play when Riley called a self-inflicted rules violation on himself after his ball moved at address, resulting in a penalty stroke that secured the victory for Scheffler.

== Course ==
The Martis Camp Club golf course is an 18-hole championship layout designed by Tom Fazio, which opened for play in June 2008. For the 2013 U.S. Junior Amateur, the course was set up as a par-72 playing at 7,740 yards, making it the longest course configuration in the tournament's history up to that time.

Situated at elevations ranging from roughly 6,200 to 6,900 feet in the Sierra Nevada mountains, the course layout features a heavily forested front nine with dramatic elevation changes, while the back nine transitions to a valley floor that repeatedly crosses Martis Creek. The course architecture emphasizes wide fairways flanked by thick pine trees, intricate greens with severe contours, and strategic bunker placements that protect the approach zones.

The course would go on to host the 2023 U.S. Senior Amateur.

Hole	1	2	3	4	5	6	7	8	9	Out	10	11	12	13	14	15	16	17	18	In	Total
Yards	396	478	219	568	458	395	565	249	470	3,798	598	465	416	475	153	553	314	198	470	3,942	7,740
Par	4	4	3	5	4	4	5	3	4	36	5	4	4	4	3	5	4	3	4	36	72

== Format ==
The championship consisted of a 36-hole stroke play qualification, from which the top 64 players advance to a single elimination match play bracket to determine the champion.

== Field ==
The USGA received 2,860 entries from which the final field was 156 was composed from a mix of local qualifying events and automatic exemptions.

To be eligible, all exempt players must have had a Handicap Index not exceeding 6.4 and must not have reached their 18th birthday by the conclusion of the championship. A number of paths to bypass local qualifying and gain automatic exemption to the championship were available including past champions, previous finalists, quarterfinalists from the previous year's U.S. Amateur, highly ranked players in the WAGR rankings, and winners of selected state, regional and international events (such as the R&A Boys Amateur).

Among the field in 2013 were future tour professionals Cameron Young, Maverick McNealy, Ben Griffin, Sam Burns, Sahith Theegala, Nick Hardy, Justin Suh, Sam Horsfield, Ryan Ruffels, Jin Cheng and Aaron Wise. Other notable additions to the field were Jim Liu, champion of the 2010 U.S. Junior Amateur and runner-up at the 2012 U.S. Junior Amateur, and Andy Zhang, who in 2012 had become the youngest player to ever compete in the U.S. Open.

== Stroke play ==
Past champion Jim Liu was the stroke play medalist after shooting rounds of 69 and 67 for a total of 8-under par 136. The top-5 was rounded out by Cameron Young at 6-under par 138, Scottie Scheffler at 5-under par 139, and Davis Riley and Zachary Bauchou at 4-under par 140. Scheffler, Liu and Corey Eddings shared the low 18-hole round of the tournament with 67s.

The cut for match play qualification came at 7-over par 151, with 12 players tied for the last 8 spots in the field. Chase Johnson, Andy Zhang, Matt Echelmeier, Coleman Self, Spencer Painton, Dean Sakata and Will Bernstein advanced with 3s on the first playoff hole, while Will Minton was eliminated with a 6. Matthew Lowe ultimately advanced over Jae Hoon Kim, Ben Doyle, and Victor Ponte with a 3 on the 4th playoff hole.

First round – Monday, July 22, 2013
Second round – Tuesday, July 23, 2013

Place	Player	Score	To par
1	(United States) Jim Liu	69-67=136	−8
2	(United States) Cameron Young	68-70=138	−6
3	(United States) Scottie Scheffler	67-72=139	−5
T4	(United States) Davis Riley	71-69=140	−4
T4	(United States) Zachary Bauchou	70-70=140	−4
T6	(Venezuela) Jorge Pichu Garcia	69-72=141	−3
T6	(United States) Corey Eddings	67-74=141	−3
T6	(England) Sam Horsfield	70-71=141	−3
T9	(United States) Aaron Terrazas	69-73=142	−2
T9	(United States) Adam Wood	70-72=142	−2
T9	(United States) Wilson Furr	71-71=142	−2

Leaderboard below the top 10
Place	Player	Score	To par
T12	(United States) Tyler Moore	71-72=143	−1
T12	(United States) William Register	75-68=143	−1
T14	(United States) Jack Comstock	69-75=144	E
T14	(United States) George Cunningham	69-75=144	E
T14	(Australia) Lucas Herbert	74-70=144	E
T14	(Mexico) Álvaro Ortiz	70-74=144	E
T18	(China) Jin Cheng	74-71=145	+1
T18	(United States) Ben Griffin	74-71=145	+1
T18	(United States) Daniel Connolly	72-73=145	+1
T18	(Australia) Ryan Ruffels	76-69=145	+1
T22	(United States) P.J. Samiere	74-72=146	+2
T22	(United States) William Gordon	74-72=146	+2
T22	(United States) Nick Hardy	74-72=146	+2
T22	(Zimbabwe) Sean Crocker	77-69=146	+2
T22	(United States) Thaddeus Obecny II	74-72=146	+2
T22	(United States) Joshua Seiple	76-70=146	+2
T22	(United States) Brian Mogg	75-71=146	+2
T29	(United States) Maverick McNealy	78-69=147	+3
T29	(United States) Sahith Theegala	76-71=147	+3
T29	(Costa Rica) Luis Gagne	78-69=147	+3
T29	(United States) Matthew Perrine	74-73=147	+3
T29	(United States) John Augenstein	72-75=147	+3
T29	(Canada) Patrick Murphy	77-70=147	+3
T29	(United States) Tyson Reeder	76-71=147	+3
T29	(United States) Cole Berman	73-74=147	+3
T29	(United States) Jeremy Wall	71-76=147	+3

== Match play ==
The match play portion of the tournament featured several future PGA Tour standouts. In the early rounds, Scottie Scheffler defeated Maverick McNealy, 1 up, in the round of 32 and Justin Suh in 19 holes in the round of 16. On the other side of the bracket, Davis Riley advanced by defeating Luis Gagne, Zecheng Dou, and John Augenstein. In the quarterfinals, Doug Ghim eliminated future PGA Tour star Cameron Young, 4 and 3, before falling to Scheffler, 6 and 4, in the semifinals.

In the 36-hole final match, Riley built an early lead and held a 2 up advantage through 27 holes. Scheffler then mounted a late-afternoon rally, winning four consecutive holes down the stretch. On the par-4 16th hole, with Scheffler leading, Riley called a rules infraction on himself when his ball moved at address. The resulting one-stroke penalty gave Riley a bogey, securing a 3 and 2 victory and the championship for Scheffler.

First round July 24
136	(United States) Jim Liu	19 holes
151	(United States) Matthew Lowe
147	(United States) Matthew Perrine
147	(United States) John Augenstein	5&4
144	(Australia) Lucas Herbert
149	(United States) Brian Carlson	4&3
144	(Mexico) Álvaro Ortiz
149	(United States) Brad Dalke	4&3
146	(Zimbabwe) Sean Crocker	7&5
148	(United States) Austin Connelly
147	(United States) Aaron Terrazas	20 holes
150	(United States) Wes Artac
146	(United States) Nick Hardy	3&2
148	(United States) Will Grimmer
141	(England) Sam Horsfield	7&6
151	(United States) Dean Sakata
140	(United States) Zachary Bauchou	19 holes
151	(United States) Coleman Self
147	(Canada) Patrick Murphy
147	(United States) Sahith Theegala	1 up
143	(United States) Tyler Moore
150	(China) Dou Zecheng	4&3
145	(Australia) Ryan Ruffels	4&2
149	(United States) Theo Humphrey
140	(United States) Davis Riley	3&1
151	(United States) Chase Johnson
146	(United States) Brian Mogg
147	(Costa Rica) Luis Gagne	2&1
143	(United States) William Register
150	(United States) Trevor Phillips	4&3
145	(United States) Daniel Connolly	2&1
148	(United States) Jacob Joiner
138	(United States) Cameron Young	3&1
151	(United States) Matt Echelmaier
147	(United States) Jeremy Wall
147	(United States) Tyson Reeder	5&4
144	(United States) George Cunningham	1 up
149	(United States) Mitchell Schow
145	(China) Jin Cheng
149	(United States) Jeffrey Swegle	1up
141	(United States) Corey Eddings	3&2
151	(United States) Will Bernstein
146	(United States) Thaddeus Obecny II
148	(Canada) Jooho Lee	20 holes
142	(United States) Adam Wood
150	(United States) Doug Ghim	2&1
146	(United States) William Gordon	2&1
148	(United States) Jake Shuman
139	(United States) Scottie Scheffler	7&5
151	(United States) Spencer Painton
147	(United States) Cole Berman
147	(United States) Maverick McNealy	2&1
144	(United States) Jake Comstock
149	(United States) Corey Shaun	1 up
145	(United States) Ben Griffin
149	(United States) Justin Suh	6&4
141	(Venezuela) Jorge Pichu Garcia	3&1
151	(China) Andy Zhang
146	(United States) Joshua Seiple
148	(United States) Nick Heinen	19 holes
142	(United States) Wilson Furr	1 up
150	(United States) Keenan Huskey
146	(United States) P.J. Samiere	4&3
148	(United States) Sam Meuret

Round of 32; July 25
(United States) Jim Liu
(United States) John Augenstein	20 holes
(United States) Brian Carlson	1 up
(United States) Brad Dalke
(Zimbabwe) Sean Crocker
(United States) Aaron Terrazas	22 holes
(United States) Nick Hardy
(England) Sam Horsfield	8&7
(United States) Zachary Bauchou	1 up
(United States) Sahith Theegala
(China) Dou Zecheng	3&2
(Australia) Ryan Ruffels
(United States) Davis Riley	5&4
(Costa Rica) Luis Gagne
(United States) Trevor Phillips	3&2
(United States) Daniel Connolly
(United States) Cameron Young	3&2
(United States) Tyson Reeder
(United States) George Cunningham	4&2
(United States) Jeffrey Swegle
(United States) Corey Eddings	3&2
(Canada) Jooho Lee
(United States) Doug Ghim	2&1
(England) William Gordon
(United States) Scottie Scheffler	1 up
(United States) Maverick McNealy
(United States) Corey Shaun
(United States) Justin Suh	3&1
(Venezuela) Jorge Pichu Garcia
(United States) Nick Heinen	3&2
(United States) Wilson Furr
(United States) P.J. Samiere	2 up

Round of 16; July 25
(United States) John Augenstein	1 up
(United States) Brian Carlson
(United States) Aaron Terrazas
(England) Sam Horsfield	6&5
(United States) Zachary Bauchou
(China) Dou Zecheng	2&1
(United States) Davis Riley	2&1
(United States) Trevor Phillips
(United States) Cameron Young	3&2
(United States) George Cunningham
(United States) Corey Eddings
(United States) Doug Ghim	4&3
(United States) Scottie Scheffler	19 holes
(United States) Justin Suh
(United States) Nick Heinen
(United States) P.J. Samiere	3&1

Quarterfinals; July 26
(United States) John Augenstein	20 holes
(England) Sam Horsfield
(China) Dou Zecheng
(United States) Davis Riley	4&2
(United States) Cameron Young
(United States) Doug Ghim	4&3
(United States) Scottie Scheffler	3&2
(United States) P.J. Samiere

Semifinals; July 26
(United States) John Augenstein
(United States) Davis Riley	4&3
(United States) Doug Ghim
(United States) Scottie Scheffler	6&4

Final; July 27
(United States) Davis Riley
(United States) Scottie Scheffler	3&2
