= Valspar Championship =

Golf tournament in Palm Harbor, Florida, US

Coordinates: 28.111°N 82.754°W

Tournament information
- Location: Palm Harbor, Florida
- Established: 2000
- Courses: Innisbrook Resort and Golf Club (Copperhead Course)
- Par: 71
- Length: 7,340 yards (6,710 m)
- Organized by: The Copperheads
- Tour: PGA Tour
- Format: Stroke play
- Prize fund: US$9,100,000
- Month played: March

Tournament record score
- Aggregate: 266 Vijay Singh (2004)
- To par: −18 as above

Current champion
- (England) Matt Fitzpatrick

Location map
- Location in the United States Location in Florida

The Valspar Championship is a professional golf tournament on the PGA Tour, played annually on the Copperhead Course at Innisbrook Resort and Golf Club in Palm Harbor, north of St. Petersburg, Florida.

== History ==
The tournament was founded in 2000 as the Tampa Bay Classic, and was originally an alternate event in autumn and late summer. It replaced the JCPenney Classic, held annually in central Florida since 1960, and at Innisbrook since 1990. It was opposite the Presidents Cup in October 2000, and the same week as the WGC-American Express Championship in September 2002. It was scheduled for the same week as the WGC-American Express Championship in 2001 in mid-September, but the September 11 attacks (on Tuesday) forced the cancellations of both tournaments.

From 2003 to 2006, the Tampa Bay event had a slot in the schedule to itself in late October (and early November in 2003) as the last full-field event before the Tour Championship. The Chrysler Corporation was the title sponsor.

Since 2007, the Tampa Bay event has been played in March, as the Players Championship moved six weeks later, to mid-May.

For a time, the tournament was without a title sponsor, leading to speculation on its fate beyond 2007. Then, on January 24, 2007, tournament officials and the PGA Tour announced a six-year sponsorship agreement with PODS of Clearwater, Florida. However, the company chose to exercise an option to withdraw as title sponsor after the 2008 event, and tournament officials searched to find a replacement. On June 4, 2008, Transitions Optical, Inc., the photochromic lens manufacturer headquartered locally in Largo, was announced as the new title sponsor. Transitions left the event after the 2012 season. Just two weeks before the 2013 tournament, EverBank agreed to be presenting sponsor for the tournament. In September 2013, Valspar Corporation signed a four-year deal to become title sponsor of the event, now named the Valspar Championship. On March 9, 2016, the PGA Tour, Valspar Corporation, and Copperhead Charities – the Valspar Championship host organization – announced a three-year title sponsorship extension, thus carrying Valspar's commitment to the tournament through 2020. This extension occurred in the midst of the original contract period, which was from 2013 to 2017.

Vijay Singh set the tournament record in 2004 with 266 (−18) and won by five strokes.

== Winners ==
Year	Winner	Score	To par	Margin of victory	Runner(s)-up	Purse ($)	Winner's share ($)
Valspar Championship
2026	(England) Matt Fitzpatrick	273	−11	1 stroke	(United States) David Lipsky	9,100,000	1,638,000
2025	(Norway) Viktor Hovland	273	−11	1 stroke	(United States) Justin Thomas	8,700,000	1,566,000
2024	(United States) Peter Malnati	272	−12	2 strokes	(United States) Cameron Young	8,400,000	1,512,000
2023	(United States) Taylor Moore	274	−10	1 stroke	(United States) Adam Schenk	8,100,000	1,458,000
2022	(United States) Sam Burns (2)	267	−17	Playoff	(United States) Davis Riley	7,800,000	1,404,000
2021	(United States) Sam Burns	267	−17	3 strokes	(United States) Keegan Bradley	6,900,000	1,242,000
2020	Canceled due to the COVID-19 pandemic						
2019	(England) Paul Casey (2)	276	−8	1 stroke	(United States) Jason Kokrak (South Africa) Louis Oosthuizen	6,700,000	1,206,000
2018	(England) Paul Casey	274	−10	1 stroke	(United States) Patrick Reed (United States) Tiger Woods	6,500,000	1,170,000
2017	(Canada) Adam Hadwin	270	−14	1 stroke	(United States) Patrick Cantlay	6,300,000	1,134,000
2016	(South Africa) Charl Schwartzel	277	−7	Playoff	(United States) Bill Haas	6,100,000	1,098,000
2015	(United States) Jordan Spieth	274	−10	Playoff	(United States) Sean O'Hair (United States) Patrick Reed	5,900,000	1,062,000
2014	(Australia) John Senden	277	−7	1 stroke	(United States) Kevin Na	5,700,000	1,026,000
Tampa Bay Championship
2013	(United States) Kevin Streelman	274	−10	2 strokes	(United States) Boo Weekley	5,500,000	990,000
Transitions Championship
2012	(England) Luke Donald	271	−13	Playoff	(South Korea) Bae Sang-moon (United States) Jim Furyk (United States) Robert Garrigus	5,500,000	990,000
2011	(United States) Gary Woodland	269	−15	1 stroke	(United States) Webb Simpson	5,500,000	990,000
2010	(United States) Jim Furyk	271	−13	1 stroke	(South Korea) K. J. Choi	5,400,000	972,000
2009	(South Africa) Retief Goosen (2)	276	−8	1 stroke	(United States) Charles Howell III (United States) Brett Quigley	5,400,000	972,000
PODS Championship
2008	(United States) Sean O'Hair	280	−4	2 strokes	(United States) Stewart Cink (Japan) Ryuji Imada (United States) Troy Matteson (United States) Billy Mayfair (United States) George McNeill (Australia) John Senden	5,300,000	954,000
2007	(United States) Mark Calcavecchia	274	−10	1 stroke	(Australia) John Senden (United States) Heath Slocum	5,300,000	954,000
Chrysler Championship
2006	(South Korea) K. J. Choi (2)	271	−13	4 strokes	(United States) Paul Goydos (United States) Brett Wetterich	5,300,000	954,000
2005	(Sweden) Carl Pettersson	275	−9	1 stroke	(United States) Chad Campbell	5,300,000	954,000
2004	(Fiji) Vijay Singh	266	−18	5 strokes	(United States) Tommy Armour III (Sweden) Jesper Parnevik	5,000,000	900,000
2003	(South Africa) Retief Goosen	272	−12	3 strokes	(Fiji) Vijay Singh	4,800,000	864,000
Tampa Bay Classic
2002	(South Korea) K. J. Choi	267	−17	7 strokes	(United States) Glen Day	2,600,000	468,000
2001	Canceled due to the September 11 attacks						
2000	(United States) John Huston	271	−13	3 strokes	(United States) Carl Paulson	2,400,000	432,000

Note: Green highlight indicates scoring records.

== Multiple winners ==
Four players have won this tournament more than once:

- K. J. Choi (2002, 2006)
- Retief Goosen (2003, 2009)
- Paul Casey (2018, 2019)
- Sam Burns (2021, 2022)
