= Scottie Scheffler =

American professional golfer (born 1996)

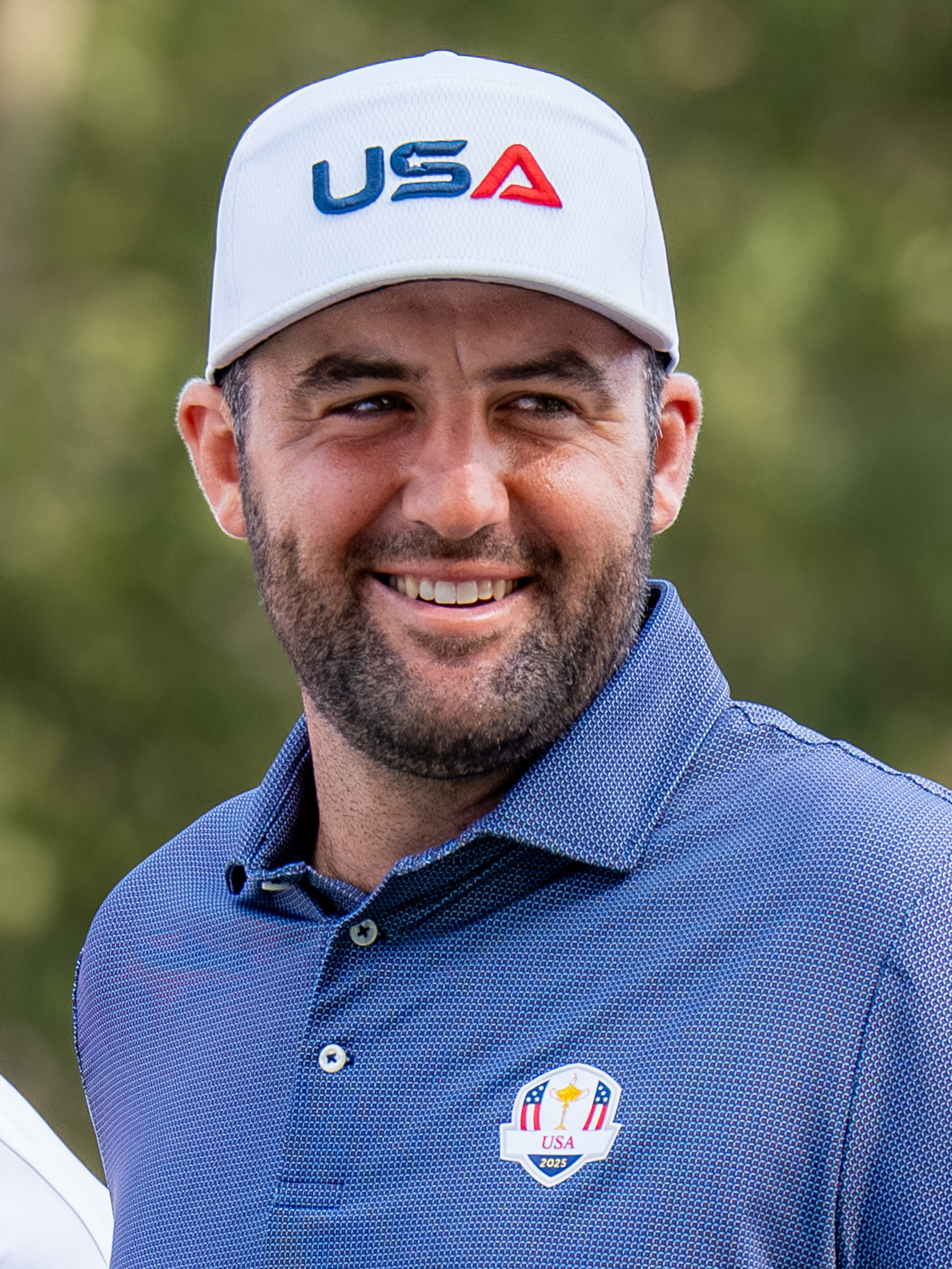
- Scheffler at the 2025 Ryder Cup

Personal information
- Full name: Scott Alexander Scheffler
- Nationality: United States
- Born: June 21, 1996 (age 30) Ridgewood, New Jersey, U.S.
- Height: 6 ft 3 in (191 cm)
- Weight: 200 lb (91 kg)
- Spouse: Meredith Scudder (m. 2020)
- Children: 2

Career
- Sport: Golf
- College: University of Texas at Austin
- Turned professional: 2018
- Current tour: PGA Tour
- Former tour: Korn Ferry Tour
- Professional wins: 27
- Highest ranking: 1 (March 27, 2022) (215 weeks, as of October 25, 2026)

Number of wins by tour
- PGA Tour: 22
- European Tour: 5
- Korn Ferry Tour: 2
- Other: 3

Best results in major championships (wins: 4)
- Masters Tournament: Won: 2022, 2024
- PGA Championship: Won: 2025
- U.S. Open: T2: 2022
- The Open Championship: Won: 2025

Achievements and awards
- Korn Ferry Tour Finals points list winner: 2019
- Korn Ferry Tour Player of the Year: 2019
- Korn Ferry Tour Rookie of the Year: 2019
- PGA Tour Rookie of the Year: 2019–20
- PGA Tour money list winner: 2021–22, 2022–23, 2024, 2025
- PGA Tour Player of the Year: 2021–22, 2022–23, 2024, 2025
- Byron Nelson Award: 2022–23, 2024, 2025
- Mark H. McCormack Award: 2022, 2023, 2024, 2025
- Best Golfer ESPY Award: 2023, 2024, 2025, 2026
- PGA Tour FedEx Cup winner: 2024, 2026
Medal record
Men's golf
Representing the United States
Olympic Games
Gold medal – first place	2024 Paris	Individual

Scott Alexander Scheffler (born June 21, 1996) is an American professional golfer who plays on the PGA Tour. He is currently ranked world number one in the Official World Golf Ranking, a position he has held for over 175 weeks during his career. He has won four major championships.

Following a successful amateur career, Scheffler turned professional in 2018 and was named PGA Tour Rookie of the Year in 2020. He reached number one in the world rankings in March 2022 and won his first major championship at the 2022 Masters Tournament the following month. Scheffler won The Players Championship in 2023 and 2024, becoming the first to win the title in back-to-back years. He claimed his second major championship at the 2024 Masters Tournament and won the gold medal in the men's individual tournament at the 2024 Summer Olympics. Scheffler added his third major at the 2025 PGA Championship and his fourth at the 2025 Open Championship.

Scheffler has been named PGA Tour Player of the Year for four consecutive seasons and has led the PGA Tour money list for four consecutive seasons; he ranks first in the tour's all-time money list, with career earnings exceeding $130 million as of 2026. He was named one of Time's 100 most influential people in the world in 2026.

== Early life and amateur career ==
Scheffler was born in Ridgewood, New Jersey, on June 21, 1996. His father, Scott, grew up in Englewood Cliffs, and his mother, Diane (née DeLorenzo), grew up in Park Ridge. Scheffler is of Italian descent on his mother's side and German descent on his father's side. His grandfather was a veteran of the U.S. military who served in the Korean War. Scheffler was the only boy among four children. His sisters are named Callie, Molly and Sara. The family lived in Montvale, New Jersey, until Scheffler was aged six, when they moved to Dallas, Texas, in the wake of the September 11 attacks. Scott was a carpenter who became a stay-at-home dad, while Diane worked as a business manager at the law firm Skadden, Arps, Slate, Meagher & Flom, and later as a chief operating officer at the law firm Thompson & Knight in Dallas.

Scheffler's interest in golf began at age three, when his parents gave him a set of plastic clubs and ball. He practiced as a child by hitting ping-pong balls inside his home, curving the ball from one room to the next. While living in New Jersey, Scheffler frequently asked his father to take him to the 9W Driving Range in Palisades, New York, near the Hudson River. In winter, Scheffler's father shoveled snow from the range to allow him to still practice. After the move to Dallas, his parents borrowed $50,000 to join Royal Oaks Country Club, where Scheffler began to receive tutelage under instructor Randy Smith, who had coached Justin Leonard to a victory at the 1997 Open Championship. At Royal Oaks, Scheffler also learned from professional golfers such as Leonard, Ryan Palmer, Colt Knost, and Harrison Frazar. He watched them as they practiced, and from the age of nine would challenge them to chipping and putting contests. He had prolific success at the youth level, and won 90 of the 136 tournaments he played on the Northern Texas PGA junior circuit, competing against the likes of fellow Dallas-area golfer Will Zalatoris.

Entering high school, Scheffler was barely 5 feet (1.5 m) in height, but experienced a large growth spurt and soon measured over 6 feet (1.8 m) tall. He played golf and basketball at Highland Park High School in the Dallas enclave of University Park. At Highland Park, Scheffler won individual state titles three years in a row (2012 to 2014), matching a record set by fellow Texan Jordan Spieth. He also had success in AJGA events, and won the 2013 U.S. Junior Amateur, defeating Davis Riley 3 and 2. Scheffler was the top-ranked junior golfer in the country in 2014, and in April 2014 he won the Junior Invitational at Sage Valley. He made his PGA Tour debut in May 2014, as a 17-year-old amateur at the HP Byron Nelson Championship. With his sister Callie caddying for him, he made the cut. He recorded a hole-in-one in the third round and ultimately finished at 4-under-par, in a tie for 22nd place. He was ineligible for the $60,000 payout due to his amateur status.

Scheffler was then recruited to play golf for the Texas Longhorns at the University of Texas at Austin beginning in fall 2014. He won his first individual collegiate title, the Western Intercollegiate held at Pasatiempo Golf Club, in April 2015. Two weeks later, he won the Big 12 Individual Championship held at Southern Hills Country Club. He was named 2015 "Phil Mickelson Freshman of the Year" and Big 12 Newcomer of the Year due to these performances. He struggled with back injuries during his sophomore season, and recorded only one top-10 finish. Texas Longhorns golf coach John Fields said Scheffler was still adapting to his physical growth: "He's gone from 5-foot-2, 100 pounds in eighth grade to almost 6-foot-4, 200 pounds just six years later."

In June 2016, Scheffler qualified for his first U.S. Open. He opened with a first-round 69 and held the overnight clubhouse lead, but shot a second-round 78 to miss the cut by one stroke. He was then selected to represent the United States at the 2016 Eisenhower Trophy in September, and won the East Lake Cup held at East Lake Golf Club in October. Scheffler again qualified for the U.S. Open in 2017, after surviving a 4-for-3 playoff to earn a spot in the field. He and Cameron Champ were the only two amateurs to make the cut at the 2017 U.S. Open. Scheffler finished as low amateur at 1-under-par, one stroke ahead of Champ. He was also part of the U.S. team that won the 2017 Walker Cup, where he defeated Connor Syme in the Sunday singles. Scheffler became a member of the Texas Cowboys in the spring of 2017, and graduated from the University of Texas at Austin's McCombs School of Business in 2018 with a bachelor's degree in finance.

== Professional career ==
=== 2019: Korn Ferry Tour Player of the Year ===
Scheffler turned professional after graduating from college in spring 2018. He began to play in Monday qualifiers but had little success. In December 2018, Scheffler earned his 2019 Web.com Tour card through qualifying school. He finished tied-34th, one shot inside the top 40 cutoff. He got up-and-down to make par on the final hole and secure his playing status. In 2022, Scheffler described this as the most important par save of his career. He said "there's more pressure going into the final round of Q-School than there is Masters Sunday because, if I fail at Q-School, I've got a whole other year where I don't have anywhere to play."

On May 5, 2019, Scheffler shot a final-round 64 to tie for first alongside Robby Shelton at the Nashville Golf Open. Shelton won the ensuing playoff. This was Scheffler's fourth consecutive top-10 finish on the Web.com Tour. Three weeks later, Scheffler fired a bogey-free, 9-under 63—playing the back nine in 30—to force a playoff with 54-hole leader Marcelo Rozo in the Evans Scholars Invitational. He then birdied the second extra hole for his first Web.com Tour victory.

On August 18, 2019, Scheffler won the Nationwide Children's Hospital Championship in Columbus, Ohio. Scheffler shot 4-under 67 in the final round at Ohio State University's Scarlet Course for a two-shot victory. He totaled a 12-under 272 for the week and finished two shots ahead of Brendon Todd, Beau Hossler and Ben Taylor. This event was part of the Korn Ferry Tour Finals (the Web.com Tour was renamed the Korn Ferry Tour in mid-season). Scheffler led both the Finals points list and the overall points list to earn a fully exempt PGA Tour card for the 2020 season. He was later named Korn Ferry Tour Player of the Year.

=== 2020: PGA Tour Rookie of the Year ===
In his first start of 2020, Scheffler was tied for the lead alongside Andrew Landry after three rounds at The American Express. A final-round 70 saw Scheffler finish third, three shots behind Landry.

During the suspension of the PGA Tour due to the COVID-19 pandemic, Scheffler competed in the Maridoe Samaritan Fund Invitational in April 2020, a tournament organized to raise money for caddies who were unable to work due to the COVID lockdowns. Scheffler shot rounds of 66-74-67 to win the 54-hole event, ahead of Will Zalatoris in second and Viktor Hovland in third, and donated $9,000 to the caddie fund.

In August 2020, Scheffler finished tied for fourth at the 2020 PGA Championship, his first top-10 finish at a major. Two weeks later, Scheffler shot a 12-under 59 at The Northern Trust. His round was the joint second-lowest in PGA Tour history and just the 12th sub-60 round in PGA Tour history.

Hole	1	2	3	4	5	6	7	8	9	10	11	12	13	14	15	16	17	18
Par	4	5	3	4	4	4	5	3	4	4	3	4	4	4	4	3	4	5
Score	E	−1	−1	−2	−3	−4	−5	−5	−6	−7	−8	−8	−8	−9	−10	−11	−11	−12

Scheffler was one of two rookies, alongside Hovland, to qualify for the Tour Championship in September 2020. Scheffler finished fifth, receiving a $2.5 million payout. He was named the PGA Tour Rookie of the Year for the 2019–20 season.

=== 2021: Ryder Cup debut ===
Scheffler recorded the first runner-up finish of his PGA Tour career in March at the 2021 WGC-Dell Technologies Match Play, held at Austin Country Club. He was defeated by Billy Horschel, 2 and 1, in the final.

At the 2021 Masters Tournament, Scheffler tied for 18th. He then posted top-10 finishes at each of the three other majors: tied-8th at the 2021 PGA Championship, tied-7th at the 2021 U.S. Open, and tied-8th at the 2021 Open Championship.

In September 2021, Scheffler was named as a captain's pick by Steve Stricker for the U.S. team in the 2021 Ryder Cup at Whistling Straits in Kohler, Wisconsin. The U.S. team won 19–9 and Scheffler went 2–0–1 including a win in his Sunday singles match against world number one Jon Rahm.

Later that fall, he switched caddies, replacing Scott McGuinness with Bubba Watson's former caddie, Ted Scott.

=== 2022: Rise to world number one, first major title, PGA Tour Player of the Year ===
On February 13, 2022, Scheffler won his first ever PGA Tour title at the WM Phoenix Open on the third hole of a sudden-death playoff against Patrick Cantlay. Three weeks later, Scheffler won his second career PGA Tour title at the Arnold Palmer Invitational in Orlando, Florida. He won by one stroke over Viktor Hovland, Billy Horschel and Tyrrell Hatton. Three weeks after that, Scheffler won the WGC-Dell Technologies Match Play in Austin, Texas, defeating Kevin Kisner in the final match. With this win, Scheffler moved to world number one in the Official World Golf Ranking.

On April 10, 2022, Scheffler won the Masters Tournament, defeating Rory McIlroy by three strokes. Scheffler became the fifth golfer to enter the Masters Tournament ranked No. 1 in the world and go on to win the Masters, joining Ian Woosnam (1991), Fred Couples (1992), Tiger Woods (2001, 2002) and Dustin Johnson (2020). The victory was his fourth for the 2022 PGA Tour season, making him the first golfer since Arnold Palmer in 1960, and only the second ever, to win as many events including the Masters in that span of time to begin a season. The Masters was his fourth win in 6 starts.

At the 2022 PGA Championship, he missed the cut by two shots. On May 29, 2022, Scheffler lost the Charles Schwab Challenge in a playoff to Sam Burns after Burns made a 38-foot birdie putt. At the U.S. Open, he finished T-2, one stroke behind the winner Matt Fitzpatrick.

Entering the 2022 Tour Championship as the leader in the FedEx Cup standings, Scheffler started the tournament in first place with a 2-stroke lead in the starting strokes format. He extended his lead to 6 strokes after 54 holes, but shot a 3-over-par 73 in the final round to lose the tournament by one stroke to Rory McIlroy. This tied Scheffler for the PGA Tour record of largest 54-hole lead blown.

In September 2022, Scheffler was named 2022 PGA Tour Player of the Year, earning the Jack Nicklaus Award for the first time.

Scheffler qualified for the U.S. team at the 2022 Presidents Cup; he lost three of the four matches he played, tying the other.

=== 2023: Continued success, first Players Championship victory ===
In February 2023, Scheffler successfully defended his title at the WM Phoenix Open. He shot a final round 6-under 65 to beat Nick Taylor by two strokes. With the win, Scheffler returned to number one in the Official World Golf Ranking.

In March, Scheffler won The Players Championship by five strokes and regained the number one ranking in the Official World Golf Ranking for the second time in the year. It was the largest margin of victory in The Players Championship since Stephen Ames won by six in 2006. Scheffler joined Tiger Woods and Jack Nicklaus as the only players to win the Masters Tournament and The Players Championship in a 12-month span.

As the defending champion at the 2023 Masters Tournament in April, Scheffler finished tied-10th. At the 2023 PGA Championship in May, he posted a final-round 65 to tie for 2nd, two strokes behind Brooks Koepka. This result returned Scheffler to the number one spot in the Official World Golf Ranking. Scheffler followed this with a 3rd-place finish at the 2023 U.S. Open in June.

In the 2022–23 season, Scheffler recorded 18 consecutive top-12 finishes, a streak only bettered by Tiger Woods in 2000–01. For the second year in a row, he entered the Tour Championship as the leader in the FedEx Cup standings, which gave him a starting score of 10-under-par, and a two stroke lead over Viktor Hovland. He finished in a tie for sixth place at 11-under-par, 16 strokes behind the winner, Hovland.

In September, Scheffler played on the U.S. team in the 2023 Ryder Cup at Marco Simone Golf and Country Club in Rome, Italy. The European team won 16.5–11.5 and Scheffler went 0–2–2, including a tie in his Sunday singles match against Jon Rahm. In the Saturday morning foursome match, the European pair Ludvig Åberg and Viktor Hovland defeated Scheffler and Brooks Koepka 9 and 7, the biggest victory in an 18-hole match in Ryder Cup history.

In December, Scheffler won the Hero World Challenge, an unofficial event on the PGA Tour with a 20-man field. He had finished as runner-up in both of the previous two years at the tournament.

=== 2024: Nine-win season, Olympic gold medal and first FedEx Cup title ===
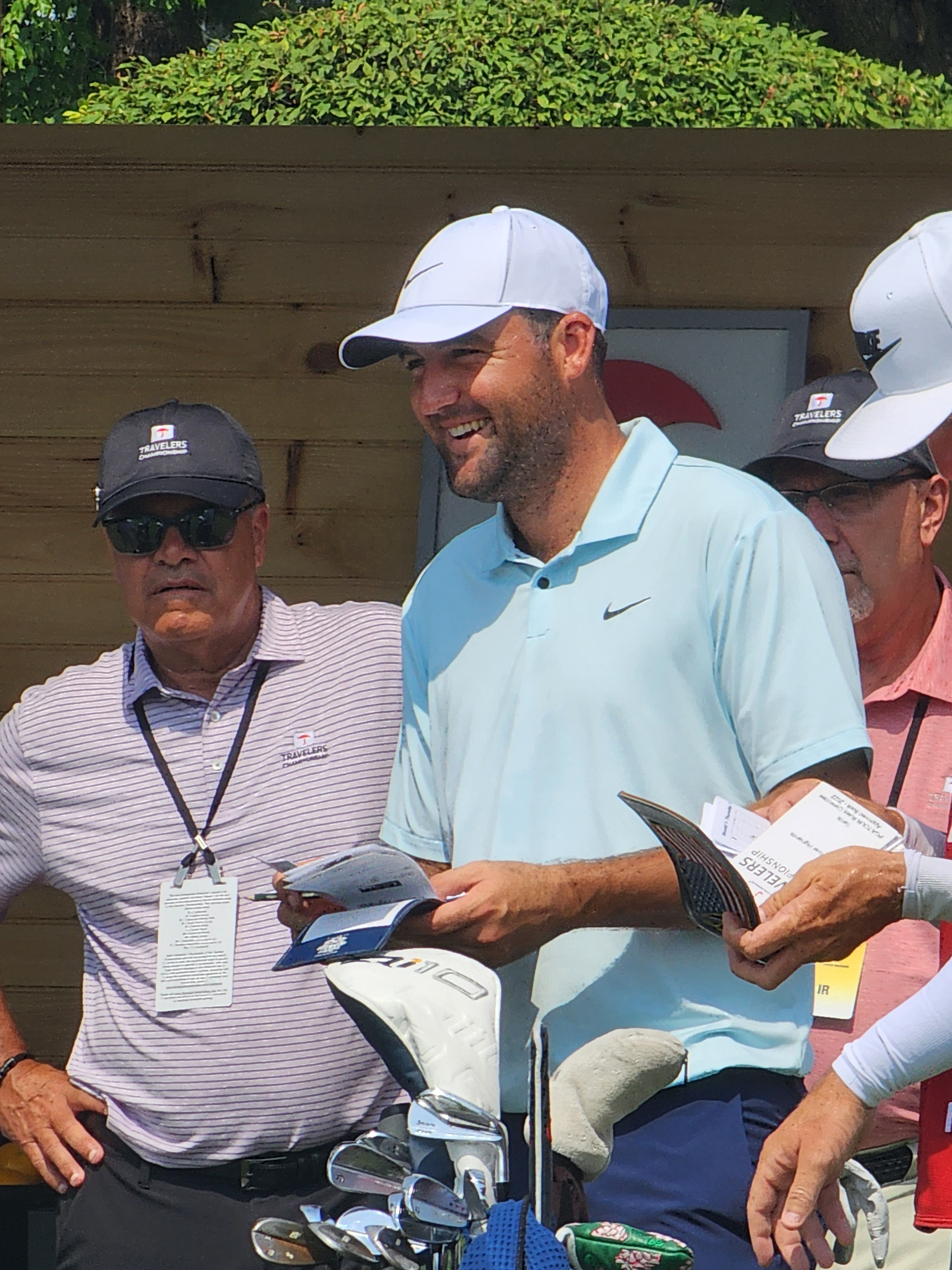
Scheffler at the Travelers Championship in June 2024

In March, Scheffler won the Arnold Palmer Invitational for the second time in his career. Scheffler ended the week 15-under par, the lowest score at Bay Hill since Rory Mcilroy in 2018. The following week, Scheffler won The Players Championship to become the first back-to-back winner in the event's history. He shot an 8-under 64 in the final round to overcome a five-shot deficit, matching the largest comeback by a Players Championship winner at TPC Sawgrass. In his next start, at the Houston Open, Scheffler was in the final group on Sunday and had a birdie putt from six feet on the 18th green to force a playoff. He missed the putt and finished in second place, one stroke behind Stephan Jäger.

In April, Scheffler won the Masters Tournament for a second time in three years. He finished at 11-under par, winning by four shots over Ludvig Åberg. Scheffler, aged 27, became the fourth-youngest player to have two Masters victories. He additionally joined Tiger Woods and Jack Nicklaus as the only players to have multiple victories at both the Players Championship and the Masters. One week later, he followed up his Masters victory with a win at the RBC Heritage for his fourth win in five starts.

At the 2024 PGA Championship at Valhalla Golf Club, Scheffler opened with a round of 67. On Friday morning prior to his second round, Scheffler was arrested after a traffic incident but was released in time to return to the course and shoot 66. However, in the third round, Scheffler broke his streak of 42 consecutive rounds of par-or-better on the PGA Tour with a two-over 73. He eventually finished the tournament tied 8th. In his next start, Scheffler was in the final group on Sunday at the Charles Schwab Challenge. He ultimately finished runner-up, five strokes behind Davis Riley.

In June, Scheffler won the Memorial Tournament for his fifth win on the season. The win pushed him over $24 million in earnings for the year, breaking the PGA Tour season earnings record. Scheffler also become the first player since Tom Watson in 1980 to have won five times on the PGA Tour before the U.S. Open. Two weeks later, Scheffler defeated Tom Kim in a sudden-death playoff at the Travelers Championship to claim his sixth win on the season. This made him the first PGA Tour golfer to win six times in a season since Tiger Woods in 2009, and the first to have won six times before July since Arnold Palmer in 1962.

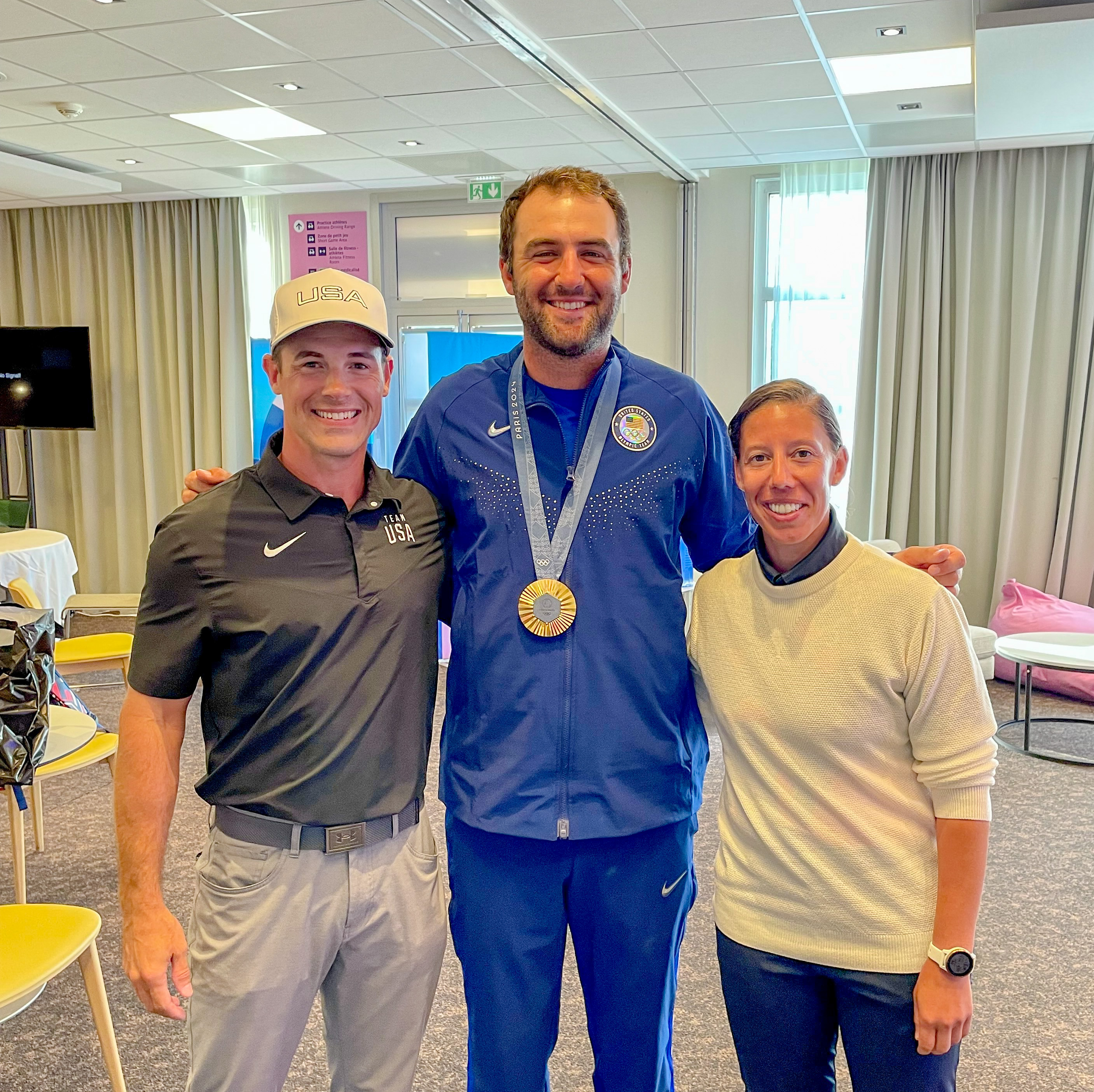
Scheffler wearing his Olympic gold medal from the 2024 Summer Olympics

As the number-one player in the world rankings, Scheffler qualified as one of the four men to represent the United States at the 2024 Olympic golf tournament in Paris. On August 4, he tied the course record at Le Golf National with a final-round 62 to finish at 19-under and win the gold medal. Scheffler, who was six strokes behind the lead after the front nine, made six birdies on the back nine to win by one stroke over Tommy Fleetwood.

At the 2024 Tour Championship held at East Lake Golf Club, Scheffler entered as the leader in the FedEx Cup standings for third year in a row, starting again at 10-under-par. He totaled 30-under-par to claim the first FedEx Cup title of his career. This made him the first player since Tiger Woods in 2007 to record a seven-win season on the PGA Tour, and earned him $25 million in bonus prize money. Along with the $8 million bonus for leading the regular-season standings and his $29 million official prize money, this brought Scheffler's total on-course earnings for the season to $62 million.

In December 2024, Scheffler won the Hero World Challenge for the second straight year. He finished at 25-under 263 to tie the tournament record at Albany Golf Course first set by Bubba Watson in 2015. This was his ninth win of the year, although neither the Olympics or Hero World Challenge count as official PGA Tour wins. Scheffler was named 2024 PGA Tour Player of the Year, earning the Jack Nicklaus Award for the third consecutive season, the first to do so since Tiger Woods in 2005–2007. Later in December, Scheffler paired with Rory McIlroy against Brooks Koepka and Bryson Dechambeau in an edition of The Match billed as a showdown between the PGA Tour and LIV Golf. Scheffler and McIlroy won the 18-hole, match-play contest.

=== 2025: Winning two major titles ===
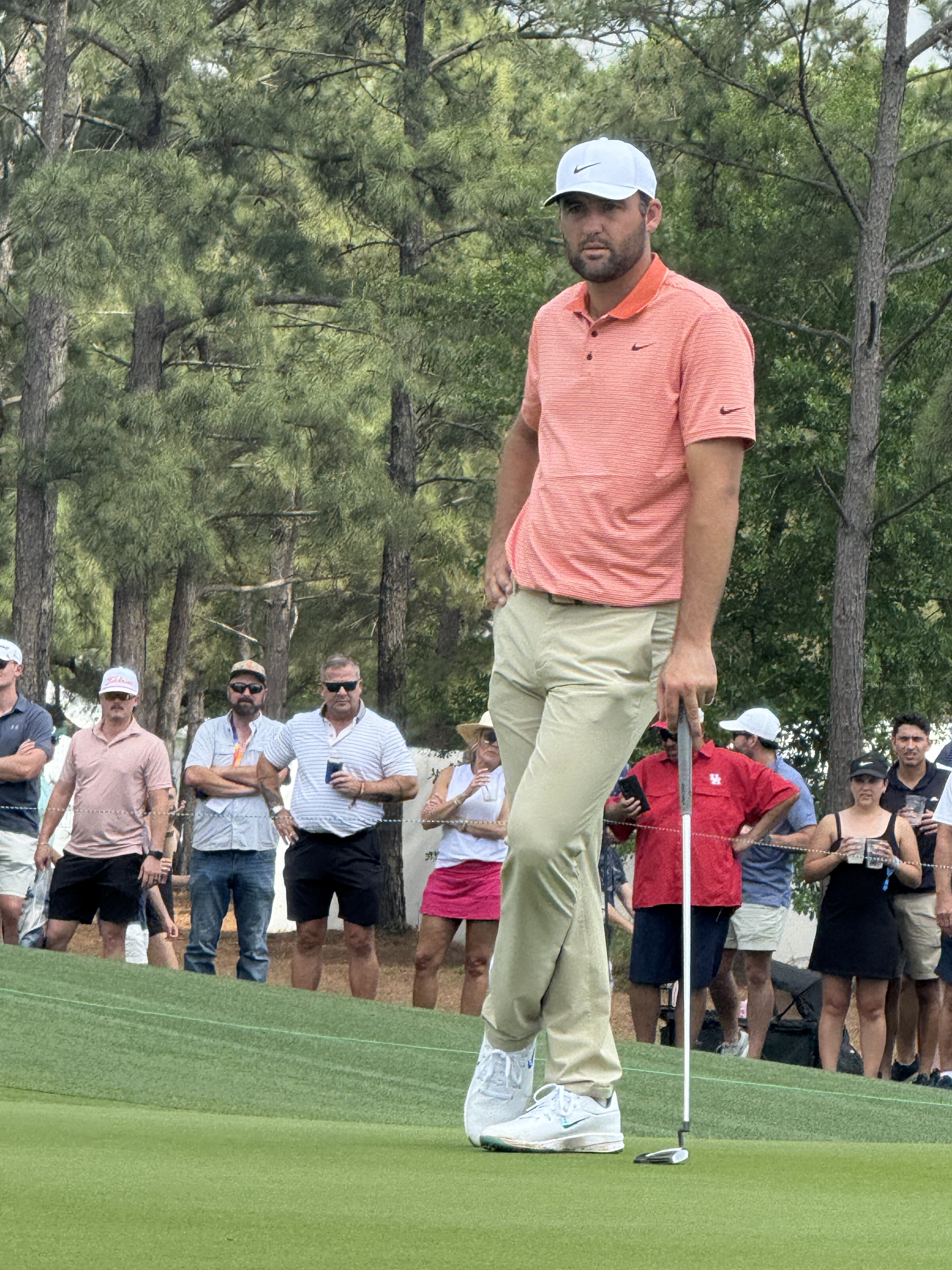
Scheffler at the Houston Open in 2025

Scheffler missed the first few weeks of the 2025 season due to injuring his right hand while making Christmas dinner. He underwent surgery to remove shards of glass from his palm and was unable to practice golf during the recovery. As the two-time defending champion at the 2025 Players Championship in March, he finished in a tie for 20th. Two weeks later, Scheffler finished runner-up at the Texas Children's Houston Open, one stroke behind Min Woo Lee. In his title defense at the 2025 Masters Tournament in April, Scheffler placed solo-fourth.

In May, Scheffler recorded his first victory of the season at the CJ Cup Byron Nelson, winning by eight strokes over Erik van Rooyen. Scheffler's total of 31-under-par 253 tied the 72-hole PGA Tour scoring record. Two weeks later, at the 2025 PGA Championship held at Quail Hollow Club, Scheffler shot 11-under 273 to claim his third major championship title. He won by five strokes over runners-up Bryson DeChambeau, Harris English, and Davis Riley. This was the largest margin of victory at the PGA Championship since Rory McIlroy won by eight at the 2012 PGA Championship. The win also made him the first golfer since Seve Ballesteros to win his first three majors by three shots or more, and he joined Jack Nicklaus and Tiger Woods as the only golfers since 1950 to win at least 15 PGA Tour tournaments before the age of 29.

Scheffler successfully defended his title at the Memorial Tournament in June, scoring 10-under to beat Ben Griffin by four strokes. It was Scheffler's third win in the span of four starts. With the victory, Scheffler joined Tiger Woods as the only repeat winners of the Memorial. Two weeks later, Scheffler finished tied-7th at the 2025 U.S. Open at 4-over 284, five strokes behind the winner J. J. Spaun. This was Scheffler's fourth top-10 finish in his previous five U.S. Open appearances.

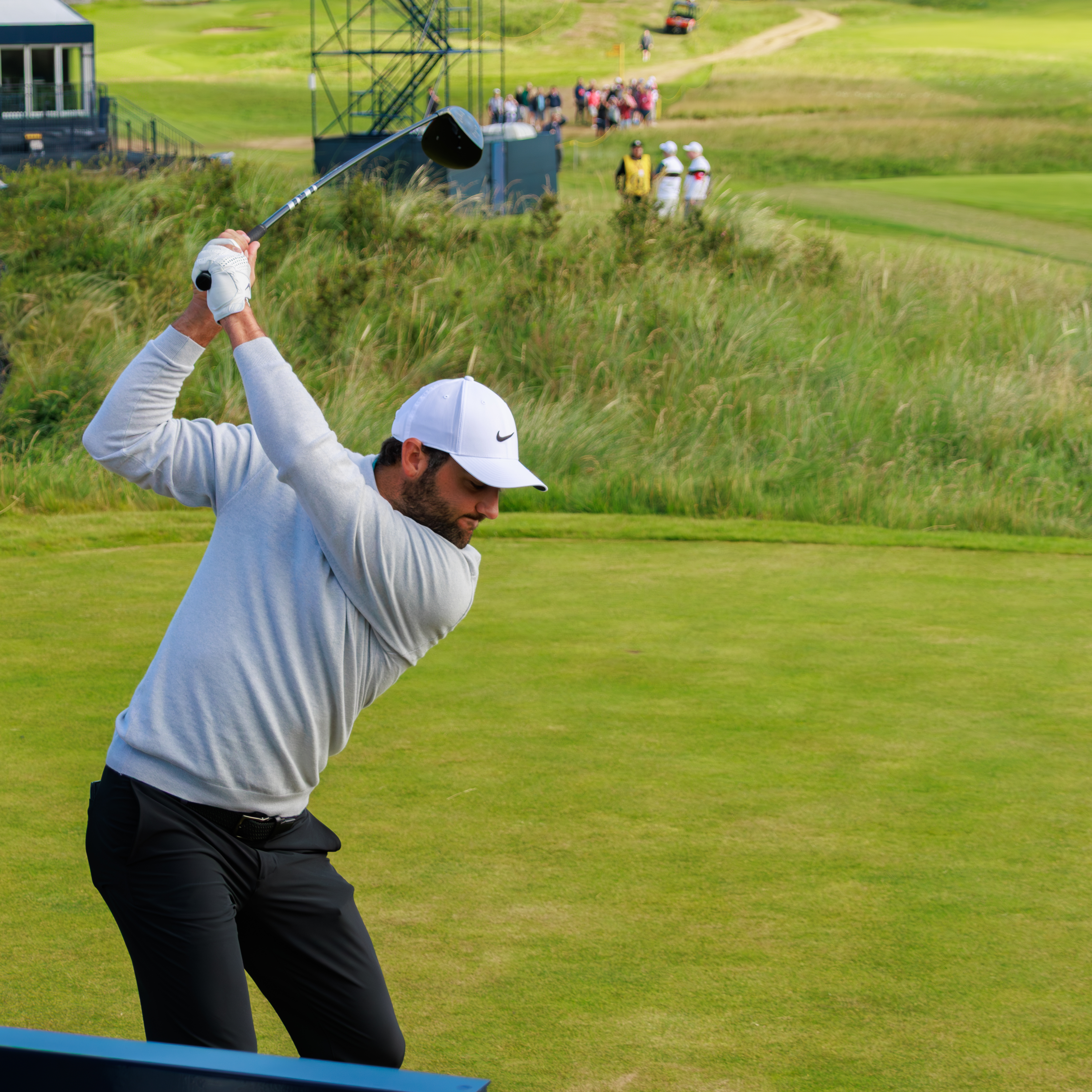
Scheffler during a practice round at Royal Portrush Golf Club in July 2025

In July, Scheffler won the 2025 Open Championship at Royal Portrush for his fourth major championship victory. He shot 17-under 267 to win by four over Harris English and claim the third leg of the career grand slam. With the victory, Scheffler became the first golfer since John Henry Taylor in 1909 to win his first four majors by three strokes or more. He also became the third golfer to win multiple majors by four or more strokes in a single year, joining Ben Hogan (1953 Masters, U.S. Open, and Open Championship) and Tiger Woods (2000 U.S. Open and Open Championship). Since the start of the Official World Golf Ranking in 1986, Scheffler joined Tiger Woods as the only two players to win the Open Championship while ranked world number one.

In August, Scheffler erased a four-shot deficit to win the BMW Championship. He closed with a 3-under 67, including a chip-in birdie from 82 feet (25 m) on the 17th hole, to win by two strokes over Robert MacIntyre. In September, Scheffler won the Procore Championship by one shot over Ben Griffin, his sixth win of the season. Scheffler joined Tiger Woods, Jack Nicklaus and Arnold Palmer as the only players since 1960 to win at least six times on the PGA Tour in consecutive seasons. Two weeks later, Scheffler represented the United States at the 2025 Ryder Cup. He had a 1–4–0 record, losing his first four matches but winning in the Sunday singles against Rory McIlroy, as the United States was defeated by Europe 15 to 13. In December, Scheffler was named as the PGA Tour Player of the Year for the fourth consecutive year.

=== 2026: Becoming the all-time PGA Tour money leader ===
In January, Scheffler won The American Express by four shots. It was Scheffler's 20th PGA Tour victory, which earned him lifetime membership on the tour. He also joined Jack Nicklaus and Tiger Woods as the only golfers to have 20 PGA Tour titles and four majors before turning 30. With the win, Scheffler received $1,656,000 in prize money, which pushed him over $100 million in career earnings on the PGA Tour. He was the third man to reach this mark, after Tiger Woods and Rory McIlroy. In February, Scheffler finished tied-12th at the Genesis Invitational, which ended his streak of 18 consecutive top-10 finishes on the PGA Tour. This was the longest such streak since Billy Casper recorded 17 in 1964–65.

At the 2026 Masters Tournament in April, Scheffler was at even par after 36 holes and trailed the leader Rory McIlroy by 12 strokes. He shot bogey-free rounds of 65-68 on the weekend to finish solo-second at 11-under, one stroke behind McIlroy. In doing so, Scheffler became the first player to avoid making a bogey in the final two rounds at the Masters since hole-by-hole data began to be recorded in 1942. The following week, Scheffler tied for first at the RBC Heritage. He lost in the ensuing playoff to Matt Fitzpatrick. Scheffler recorded his third consecutive runner-up finish at the Cadillac Championship in May, six strokes behind Cameron Young.

In his first attempt to complete the career grand slam, Scheffler was in the final pairing on Sunday alongside Wyndham Clark at the 2026 U.S. Open, held at Shinnecock Hills Golf Club in June. Starting the round in a tie for second, Scheffler shot a 1-over 71 to finish tied-fourth, four strokes behind the winner Clark. The next week, Scheffler shot 21-under 259 at the Travelers Championship to enter a playoff alongside Viktor Hovland. After Hovland made birdie on the first extra hole, Scheffler missed a 4-foot (1.2 m) putt to extend the playoff. This was Scheffler's fourth runner-up finish of the year.

Scheffler missed the cut at the Genesis Scottish Open in July, marking the first time he had failed to play the weekend since the 2022 FedEx St. Jude Championship. This ended his run of 78 consecutive made cuts, which was the longest streak since Tiger Woods' record of 142 from 1998–2005. As defending champion at the 2026 Open Championship, Scheffler shot a final-round 67 to finish in a tie for fourth.

In August, Scheffler won the FedEx St. Jude Championship for his second win of the PGA Tour season. He won by eight shots over Kim Si-woo, the largest margin of victory in the 68-year history at TPC Southwind. It was Scheffler's first win since The American Express in January. During the tournament, he shot a 9-under 61, which tied the course record at TPC Southwind. At age 30, Scheffler became the third-youngest golfer to reach 21 wins on the PGA Tour, behind only Tiger Woods and Jack Nicklaus. The win clinched him the $23 million bonus for finishing the season atop the season-long points race heading into the Tour Championship, though it was not official until after the BMW Championship.

Later that month, Scheffler won the Tour Championship to claim the FedEx Cup for a second time. He made up a three-shot deficit in the final round with a 4-under 66 to win by three over Viktor Hovland. Scheffler joined Tiger Woods and Rory McIlroy as the only multiple-time winners of the FedEx Cup. He received $10 million for the win and reached $130,390,661 in career earnings on the PGA Tour, not including bonus money. In doing so, Scheffler became the all-time money leader on the tour, eclipsing Woods' record of $120,999,166. When asked about surpassing the record, he said "it's apples and oranges", adding: "The reason our purses are so large today is because of the influence and impact that Tiger had on the game."

== Technique and coaches ==
Scheffler is regarded as the most dominant ballstriker in professional golf since Tiger Woods. During the 2022–23 PGA Tour season, Scheffler averaged 2.614 strokes gained tee-to-green per round. This was the second-best performance since strokes gained data began to be recorded in 2003, behind only Woods' 2.982 in the 2006 season. Woods praised Scheffler's ballstriking in 2024, stating that if Scheffler "putts decent, he wins; if he putts great, he blows away fields; if he has a bad putting week, he still contends."

Since the age of seven, Scheffler has been coached by PGA of America instructor Randy Smith at Royal Oaks Country Club in Dallas. Smith is the only swing coach Scheffler has had in his career as of 2024. Scheffler's unconventional footwork has drawn widespread attention in golf media, and has been dubbed the "Scheffler shuffle" and "Scottie shuffle". It involves a pronounced sliding motion in his back foot and a rolling of the lead ankle through impact, which Rick Maese of The Washington Post stated "looks like a bowler sliding near the foul line or a dancer finishing a twirl." As he transitions through the shot, Scheffler’s back foot slides backward and often lifts entirely off the ground, a technique no golf coach would traditionally teach to a student. Scheffler's footwork is a product of using ground reaction forces to create speed in his swing. His foot slide is uncommon, but not exclusive to him; Golf Channel analyst and former PGA Tour golfer Brandel Chamblee compared Scheffler's footwork to Greg Norman's. As a junior golfer, Scheffler initiated his foot slide during his downswing before hitting the ball, creating inconsistent results. Performance coach Troy Van Biezen, who has worked with Scheffler since age 14, said in 2024: "Now, when he’s playing well, his foot slides after the ball is struck, post-impact." Van Biezen credited Smith for not attempting to eliminate Scheffler's foot slide, and stated: "I wholeheartedly believe that if any other golf coach got a hold of Scottie, they would have tried to change his swing and probably would have ruined him."

Although he is not one of the longest drivers on tour, Scheffler ranks among the leaders in strokes gained off the tee by combining above-average distance and accuracy. His "Power Percentage", a statistic which measures how fast a player swings relative to their maximum speed, is only 93%, among the lowest on tour. Luke Kerr-Dineen of Golf Digest cited this as an example of Scheffler tending to swing conservatively when hitting driver, and described him as "a classic has-more-in-the-tank guy". In 2024, when missing the fairway, Scheffler ranked first on the PGA Tour in distance from the edge of the fairway, at just 18 feet (5.5 m), meaning that he generally avoided wide misses and kept the ball in play.

Scheffler in particular excels with his approach play. In the 2024 season, he gained an average of 1.269 strokes per round on approach shots, ranking first on the PGA Tour. This figure was 57% better than the second-ranked approach player Tony Finau. Rather than aggressively attacking pins, Scheffler employs a variety of shot shapes and manipulates trajectory and spin to limit the size of his misses. A Golf Digest analysis of 1,353 shots from his 2024 season showed that Scheffler is often "aiming away from the pin, and towards the wider portions of the green"; he hit 82% of greens with front pins and avoided the "red zones" (areas off the green closest to the hole) more effectively than nearly any other player. Instead of targeting short pins, Scheffler usually aimed for "green zones"—strategic areas on the green opposite the pin—adjusting his target zone ("yellow zones") based on pin placement to keep misses safe. This green-zone strategy, inspired by Ben Hogan's approach, meant he was more likely to leave himself longer but makeable putts rather than short-sided chips, which would tend to run away from the pin.

Scheffler had significant struggles with his putting in 2023, ranking 162nd on tour in strokes gained putting that season. At the 2023 Memorial Tournament, he gained 20.7 strokes tee-to-green, the most in a single tournament since Vijay Singh gained 21.1 strokes tee-to-green at the 2004 Deutsche Bank Championship, but lost 8.5 strokes putting and finished in third-place, one shot outside of a playoff. After the Tour Championship in August 2023, where he lost over 4 strokes putting, Scheffler enlisted the help of specialist putting coach Phil Kenyon. This was the first time Scheffler had recruited help for his golf game outside of his long-time coach Randy Smith. Kenyon stated the focus was about "tapping into his instincts, trying to be freer in his approach". Having previously used a blade-style putter for most of his career, Scheffler switched to a mallet putter ahead of the Arnold Palmer Invitational in March 2024. He gained over 4 strokes putting en route to victory, and also putted well during his win at the Players Championship the following week. Scheffler ranked as an above-average putter in the 2024 season, at 77th on tour. He began using a claw-style grip in December 2024 in an attempt to improve his short-range putting, while retaining a conventional grip for lag putting.

== Personal life ==
Scheffler met his wife, Meredith (née Scudder), in high school. They married in 2020 at Arlington Hall in Dallas. Their first child, a son, was born in 2024. They had another son in 2026. Scheffler and his family reside in Dallas. In 2025, he described being a professional golfer as "not a fulfilling life" and stated that he would stop competing if golf began to affect his family life. He added: "I would say my greatest priorities are my faith and my family. Those come first for me. Golf is third in that order." Scheffler was named in Time 100's 2026 list of the 100 most influential people in the world. He said in response: "If I can be a positive influence on someone's life, that's a great thing. But at the end of the day, I don't know if I'm the best role model."

Scheffler is involved with the Triumph Over Kid Cancer Foundation. A 501(c)(3) organization, it was originally founded as a fundraiser for Scheffler's childhood friend James Ragan, who was diagnosed with osteosarcoma in 2006 and died in 2014. Scheffler donated $50,000 to the foundation in 2019, and partnered with Ragan's sister Mecklin to create a golf program for pediatric cancer patients. At a fundraiser for the charity in 2024, Scheffler auctioned off the 2012 GMC Yukon which he had driven since turning professional in 2018. The auction was won by Jim Nantz, with a bid of $50,000. Scheffler and his wife Meredith are also supporters of Behind Every Door, a Christian non-profit organization that provides support to low-income areas in Dallas. Meredith is a director at Behind Every Door.

Scheffler was raised Catholic. His sponsor for his confirmation in the Catholic Church was Rocky Hambric, founder of Hambric Sports, a sports management agency. Scheffler's mother stated that "Scottie really thinks of Rocky as his godfather", and he has been a client of Hambric Sports since he turned professional. Scheffler's agent at Hambric is Blake Smith, son of Scheffler's swing coach Randy Smith. As of 2022, Scheffler is a member of Park Cities Presbyterian Church. He attends Bible study with his caddie Ted Scott, who caddied for Bubba Watson for 15 years. When requesting Scott to be his caddie, Scheffler said "I really want to work with a Christian. That's how I try to live my life." Scheffler and his close friend Sam Burns co-host an annual retreat with members of the College Golf Fellowship, a faith-based ministry.

Scheffler appeared in the sports documentary series Full Swing, which premiered on Netflix in February 2023. He made a cameo appearance in the 2025 film Happy Gilmore 2, a sequel to Happy Gilmore (1996).

In August 2023, Scheffler became an investor in the Texas Ranchers, a pickleball team. Later that year, he competed in an exhibition match with former tennis player John Isner and pickleball players Anna Leigh Waters and Ben Johns. In September 2024, Scheffler became the sole owner of the Texas Lone Stars Angling Club, a team in the Sport Fishing Championship.

On May 17, 2024, Scheffler was arrested at 6:20 a.m. near Valhalla Golf Club, the venue of the 2024 PGA Championship. He was charged with second-degree assault of a police officer, a class-C felony, and three misdemeanors: third-degree criminal mischief, reckless driving, and disregarding traffic signals from an officer directing traffic. Scheffler was released on his own recognizance at 8:40 the same morning. The charges against Scheffler were dropped on May 29. Both Scheffler and the Louisville Metro Police Department agreed to not pursue legal action related to his arrest. Prosecutor Mike O'Connell stated that Scheffler's characterization of the incident as "'a big misunderstanding' is corroborated by the evidence."

Scheffler is a long-time fan of the Dallas Stars and Texas Rangers. After winning his first Masters, Scheffler was invited to throw out the ceremonial first pitch at Globe Life Field on April 27, 2022, before the Texas Rangers–Houston Astros game. Scheffler wore his green jacket for the occasion. Both Scheffler and fellow Texan Jordan Spieth were in attendance for Game 1 of the 2023 World Series, supporting the Rangers against the Arizona Diamondbacks. Three days after winning the 2025 PGA Championship, he attended Game 1 of the 2025 NHL Western Conference Final between the Dallas Stars and Edmonton Oilers.

== Amateur wins ==
- 2011 Legends Junior Match Play Championship
- 2013 U.S. Junior Amateur
- 2014 Junior Invitational
- 2015 Annual Western Intercollegiate, Big 12 Championship
- 2016 East Lake Cup

== Professional wins (27) ==
=== PGA Tour wins (22) ===
Legend
Major championships (4)
Players Championships (2)
World Golf Championships (1)
FedEx Cup playoff events (4)
Signature events (6)
Other PGA Tour (5)

No.	Date	Tournament	Winning score	To par	Margin of victory	Runner(s)-up
1	Feb 13, 2022	WM Phoenix Open	68-71-62-67=268	−16	Playoff	(United States) Patrick Cantlay
2	Mar 6, 2022	Arnold Palmer Invitational	70-73-68-72=283	−5	1 stroke	(England) Tyrrell Hatton, (United States) Billy Horschel, (Norway) Viktor Hovland
3	Mar 27, 2022	WGC-Dell Technologies Match Play	4 and 3			(United States) Kevin Kisner
4	Apr 10, 2022	Masters Tournament	69-67-71-71=278	−10	3 strokes	(Northern Ireland) Rory McIlroy
5	Feb 12, 2023	WM Phoenix Open (2)	68-64-68-65=265	−19	2 strokes	(Canada) Nick Taylor
6	Mar 12, 2023	The Players Championship	68-69-65-69=271	−17	5 strokes	(England) Tyrrell Hatton
7	Mar 10, 2024	Arnold Palmer Invitational (2)	70-67-70-66=273	−15	5 strokes	(United States) Wyndham Clark
8	Mar 17, 2024	The Players Championship (2)	67-69-68-64=268	−20	1 stroke	(United States) Wyndham Clark, (United States) Brian Harman, (United States) Xander Schauffele
9	Apr 14, 2024	Masters Tournament (2)	66-72-71-68=277	−11	4 strokes	(Sweden) Ludvig Åberg
10	Apr 22, 2024	RBC Heritage	69-63-65-68=265	−19	3 strokes	(United States) Sahith Theegala
11	Jun 9, 2024	Memorial Tournament	67-68-71-74=280	−8	1 stroke	(United States) Collin Morikawa
12	Jun 23, 2024	Travelers Championship	65-64-64-65=258	−22	Playoff	(South Korea) Tom Kim
13	Sep 1, 2024	Tour Championship	65-66-66-67=264	−30^{1}	4 strokes	(United States) Collin Morikawa
14	May 4, 2025	CJ Cup Byron Nelson	61-63-66-63=253	−31	8 strokes	(South Africa) Erik van Rooyen
15	May 18, 2025	PGA Championship	69-68-65-71=273	−11	5 strokes	(United States) Bryson DeChambeau, (United States) Harris English, (United States) Davis Riley
16	Jun 1, 2025	Memorial Tournament (2)	70-70-68-70=278	−10	4 strokes	(United States) Ben Griffin
17	Jul 20, 2025	The Open Championship	68-64-67-68=267	−17	4 strokes	(United States) Harris English
18	Aug 17, 2025	BMW Championship	66-65-67-67=265	−15	2 strokes	(Scotland) Robert MacIntyre
19	Sep 14, 2025	Procore Championship	70-68-64-67=269	−19	1 stroke	(United States) Ben Griffin
20	Jan 25, 2026	The American Express	63-64-68-66=261	−27	4 strokes	(Australia) Jason Day, (United States) Ryan Gerard, (United States) Matt McCarty, (United States) Andrew Putnam
21	Aug 16, 2026	FedEx St. Jude Championship	68-61-68-66=263	−17	8 strokes	(South Korea) Kim Si-woo
22	Aug 30, 2026	Tour Championship (2)	65-67-66-66=264	−16	3 strokes	(Norway) Viktor Hovland

^{1}Started tournament at −10 FedEx Cup playoffs adjustment, scored −20 to par.

PGA Tour playoff record (2–3)

No.	Year	Tournament	Opponent	Result
1	2022	WM Phoenix Open	(United States) Patrick Cantlay	Won with birdie on third extra hole
2	2022	Charles Schwab Challenge	(United States) Sam Burns	Lost to birdie on first extra hole
3	2024	Travelers Championship	(South Korea) Tom Kim	Won with par on first extra hole
4	2026	RBC Heritage	(England) Matt Fitzpatrick	Lost to birdie on first extra hole
5	2026	Travelers Championship	(Norway) Viktor Hovland	Lost to birdie on first extra hole

=== Korn Ferry Tour wins (2) ===
Legend
Finals events (1)
Other Korn Ferry Tour (1)

No.	Date	Tournament	Winning score	To par	Margin of victory	Runner(s)-up
1	May 26, 2019	Evans Scholars Invitational	68-70-70-63=271	−17	Playoff	(Colombia) Marcelo Rozo
2	Aug 18, 2019	Nationwide Children's Hospital Championship	70-68-67-67=272	−12	2 strokes	(United States) Beau Hossler, (England) Ben Taylor, (United States) Brendon Todd

Korn Ferry Tour playoff record (1–1)

No.	Year	Tournament	Opponent	Result
1	2019	Nashville Golf Open	(United States) Robby Shelton	Lost to birdie on first extra hole
2	2019	Evans Scholars Invitational	(Colombia) Marcelo Rozo	Won with birdie on second extra hole

=== Other wins (3) ===
No.	Date	Tournament	Winning score	To par	Margin of victory	Runner-up
1	Dec 3, 2023	Hero World Challenge	69-66-65-68=268	−20	3 strokes	(Austria) Sepp Straka
2	Aug 4, 2024	Olympic Games	67-69-67-62=265	−19	1 stroke	(United Kingdom) Tommy Fleetwood
3	Dec 8, 2024	Hero World Challenge (2)	67-64-69-63=263	−25	6 strokes	(South Korea) Tom Kim

== Major championships ==
=== Wins (4) ===
Year	Championship	54 holes	Winning score	Margin	Runner-up
2022	Masters Tournament	3 shot lead	−10 (69-67-71-71=278)	3 strokes	(Northern Ireland) Rory McIlroy
2024	Masters Tournament (2)	1 shot lead	−11 (66-72-71-68=277)	4 strokes	(Sweden) Ludvig Åberg
2025	PGA Championship	3 shot lead	−11 (69-68-65-71=273)	5 strokes	(United States) Bryson DeChambeau, (United States) Harris English, (United States) Davis Riley
2025	The Open Championship	4 shot lead	−17 (68-64-67-68=267)	4 strokes	(United States) Harris English

=== Results timeline ===
Results not in chronological order in 2020.

Tournament	2016	2017	2018
Masters Tournament			
U.S. Open	CUT	T27LA	
The Open Championship			
PGA Championship			

Tournament	2019	2020	2021	2022	2023	2024	2025	2026
Masters Tournament		T19	T18	1	T10	1	4	2
PGA Championship		T4	T8	CUT	T2	T8	1	T14
U.S. Open	CUT		T7	T2	3	T41	T7	T4
The Open Championship		NT	T8	T21	T23	T7	1	T4

Win
Top 10
Did not play

LA = low amateur
CUT = missed the half-way cut
"T" = tied
NT = no tournament due to COVID-19 pandemic

=== Summary ===
Tournament	Wins	2nd	3rd	Top-5	Top-10	Top-25	Events	Cuts made
Masters Tournament	2	1	0	4	5	7	7	7
PGA Championship	1	1	0	3	5	6	7	6
U.S. Open	0	1	1	3	5	5	9	7
The Open Championship	1	0	0	2	4	6	6	6
Totals	4	3	1	12	19	24	29	26

- Most consecutive cuts made – 18 (2022 U.S. Open − 2026 Open Championship, current)
- Longest streak of top-10s – 6 (2024 Open Championship – 2026 Masters)

== The Players Championship ==
=== Wins (2) ===
Year	Championship	54 holes	Winning score	Margin	Runner(s)-up
2023	The Players Championship	2 shot lead	−17 (68-69-65-69=271)	5 strokes	(England) Tyrrell Hatton
2024	The Players Championship (2)	5 shot deficit	−20 (67-69-68-64=268)	1 stroke	(United States) Wyndham Clark, (United States) Brian Harman, (United States) Xander Schauffele

=== Results timeline ===
Tournament	2021	2022	2023	2024	2025	2026
The Players Championship	CUT	T55	1	1	T20	T22

Win

CUT = missed the halfway cut
"T" indicates a tie for a place

== World Golf Championships ==
=== Wins (1) ===
Year	Championship	54 holes	Winning score	Margin	Runner-up
2022	WGC-Dell Technologies Match Play	n/a	4 and 3		(United States) Kevin Kisner

=== Results timeline ===
Tournament	2020	2021	2022	2023
Championship	T26	5		
Match Play	NT^{1}	2	1	4
Invitational	T15	14		
Champions	NT^{1}	NT^{1}	NT^{1}	

^{1}Canceled due to COVID-19 pandemic

Win
Top 10
Did not play

NT = No tournament
"T" = tied
Note that the Championship and Invitational were discontinued from 2022. The Champions was discontinued from 2023.

== PGA Tour career summary ==
Season	Starts	Cuts made	Wins (majors)	2nd	3rd	Top-10	Top-25	Best finish	Earnings ($)	Money list rank
2013–14	2	1	0	0	0	0	1	T22	–	
2014–15	0	0	0	0	0	0	0	n/a	–	
2015–16	1	0	0	0	0	0	0	CUT	–	
2016–17	1	1	0	0	0	0	0	T27	–	
2017–18	3	1	0	0	0	0	0	T43	25,080	n/a**
2018–19	4	3	0	0	0	0	1	T20	139,871	n/a**
2019–20	23	18	0	0	2	7	13	3	2,833,438	22
2020–21	29	24	0	1	1	8	16	2	4,505,589	19
2021–22	25	21	4 (1)	4	1	11	18	1	14,046,910	1
2022–23	23	23	2	2	5	17	21	1	21,014,342	1
2024	19	19	7 (1)	2	1	16	17	1	29,228,357	1
2025	20	20	6 (2)	1	2	17	20	1	27,659,550	1
2026	20	19	3	5	2	13	19	1	30,937,525	1
Career*	165	145	22 (4)	14	14	85	121	1	130,390,661	1

* As of August 30, 2026.
** Scheffler was not a PGA Tour member until 2020, so he was not listed on the money list while playing as a non-member.

== U.S. national team appearances ==
Amateur

- Junior Ryder Cup: 2012 (winners)
- Spirit International: 2013 (winners)
- Eisenhower Trophy: 2016
- Walker Cup: 2017 (winners)

Professional

- Ryder Cup: 2021 (winners), 2023, 2025
- Presidents Cup: 2022 (winners), 2024 (winners), 2026 (winners)

Ryder Cup points record
2021	2023	2025	Total
2.5	1	1	4.5

== Filmography ==
=== Film ===
Year	Title	Role
2025	Happy Gilmore 2	Himself

=== Television ===
Year	Title	Role	Notes
2023–present	Full Swing	Himself	Multiple episodes

== See also ==
- 2019 Korn Ferry Tour Finals graduates – List of golfers
- Lowest rounds of golf
