= 2022 WGC-Dell Technologies Match Play =

Tournament information
- Dates: March 23–27, 2022
- Location: Austin, Texas, U.S. 30.343°N 97.797°W
- Course: Austin Country Club
- Tours: PGA Tour; European Tour; Japan Golf Tour
- Format: Match play (18 holes)

Statistics
- Par: 71
- Length: 7,108 yards (6,500 m)
- Field: 64 players
- Prize fund: US$12,000,000
- Winner's share: US$2,100,000

Champion
- (United States) Scottie Scheffler
- def. Kevin Kisner 4 & 3
- Location in the United States Location in Texas

The 2022 WGC-Dell Technologies Match Play was the 23rd WGC Match Play, played March 23–27 at Austin Country Club in Austin, Texas.

The tournament was won by 2021 runner-up Scottie Scheffler, who defeated Kevin Kisner 4 and 3 in the final. With the win, Scheffler's third in his last five starts, he rose to number one in the Official World Golf Ranking for the first time. Corey Conners beat Dustin Johnson 3 and 1 in the consolation match to claim third place.

== Format ==
The 64 players were placed into four seeded pools, the 16 highest ranked players as of March 21 in Pool A, the next 16 in Pool B, etc. The top seeds (Pool A) are placed into 16 groups in order, with the groups completed by means of a random draw of one player from each of the remaining pools.

Each group was played as a round-robin of match play matches, held on Wednesday, Thursday and Friday, with one point awarded for a win and half a point for a tie. The 16 group winners advanced to the knockout stage. If two or more players are tied on points at the end of the group stage, there was a sudden death stroke play playoff between the tied players to determine the winner of the group.

In the knockout stage, the round of 16 was played on Saturday morning, with the quarterfinals on Saturday afternoon. The semifinals were played on Sunday morning, and the final and third place playoff were played on Sunday afternoon. In total, barring withdrawals, those reaching the last four played seven rounds of golf.

== Field ==
The following players qualified for the field, consisting of the top 64 players available from the Official World Golf Ranking on March 15. They are listed with their world ranking as of March 21, which determined the seedings, and their world ranking as of March 15, which determined qualification, in parentheses.

=== Pools ===
Pool A
Seed	Player	OWGR
1	(Spain) Jon Rahm	1 (1)
2	(United States) Collin Morikawa	2 (2)
3	(Norway) Viktor Hovland	3 (3)
4	(United States) Patrick Cantlay	4 (4)
5	(United States) Scottie Scheffler	5 (5)
6	(United States) Justin Thomas	7 (8)
7	(United States) Xander Schauffele	9 (9)
8	(United States) Dustin Johnson	11 (10)
9	(United States) Bryson DeChambeau	13 (12)
10	(South Africa) Louis Oosthuizen	14 (13)
11	(United States) Jordan Spieth	15 (14)
12	(United States) Billy Horschel	16 (16)
13	(England) Tyrrell Hatton	17 (15)
14	(Chile) Joaquín Niemann	18 (18)
15	(Mexico) Abraham Ancer	19 (20)
16	(United States) Brooks Koepka	20 (21)

Pool B
Seed	Player	OWGR
17	(United States) Daniel Berger	21 (19)
18	(United States) Tony Finau	23 (23)
19	(England) Paul Casey	24 (24)
20	(England) Matt Fitzpatrick	25 (26)
21	(South Korea) Im Sung-jae	26 (25)
22	(United States) Jason Kokrak	27 (27)
23	(United States) Patrick Reed	28 (28)
24	(United States) Will Zalatoris	29 (29)
25	(United States) Kevin Na	30 (30)
26	(Belgium) Thomas Pieters	31 (31)
27	(United States) Talor Gooch	32 (32)
28	(Republic of Ireland) Shane Lowry	33 (36)
29	(United States) Kevin Kisner	34 (33)
30	(United States) Max Homa	35 (34)
31	(United States) Webb Simpson	36 (35)
32	(Australia) Adam Scott	37 (37)

Pool C
Seed	Player	OWGR
33	(United States) Tom Hoge	38 (38)
34	(United States) Russell Henley	39 (39)
35	(United States) Harold Varner III	40 (40)
36	(Canada) Corey Conners	41 (41)
37	(Australia) Marc Leishman	42 (42)
38	(United States) Matthew Wolff	43 (43)
39	(Australia) Lucas Herbert	44 (44)
40	(United States) Cameron Young	45 (46)
41	(England) Tommy Fleetwood	46 (47)
42	(Republic of Ireland) Séamus Power	48 (48)
43	(Spain) Sergio García	49 (49)
44	(United States) Brian Harman	50 (63)
45	(United States) Cameron Tringale	51 (50)
46	(England) Justin Rose	52 (51)
47	(England) Lee Westwood	53 (52)
48	(South Korea) Kim Si-woo	54 (54)

Pool D
Seed	Player	OWGR
49	(Australia) Min Woo Lee	55 (56)
50	(Sweden) Alex Norén	56 (62)
51	(Canada) Mackenzie Hughes	57 (55)
52	(South Africa) Christiaan Bezuidenhout	58 (53)
53	(United States) Luke List	59 (58)
54	(England) Richard Bland	60 (57)
55	(South Africa) Erik van Rooyen	61 (59)
56	(Japan) Takumi Kanaya	63 (60)
57	(United States) Bubba Watson	65 (61)
58	(Colombia) Sebastián Muñoz	66 (65)
59	(England) Ian Poulter	67 (64)
60	(United States) Keegan Bradley	69 (66)
61	(Scotland) Robert MacIntyre	70 (67)
62	(United States) Keith Mitchell	71 (68)
63	(Austria) Sepp Straka	72 (69)
64	(United States) Maverick McNealy	74 (70)

- Cameron Smith (6), Rory McIlroy (7), Hideki Matsuyama (11), Sam Burns (17), Harris English (22) and Phil Mickelson (45) did not play.

== Results ==
=== Pool play ===
Players were divided into 16 groups of four players and play round-robin matches Wednesday to Friday.

- Round 1 – March 23
- Round 2 – March 24
- Round 3 – March 25

==== Group 1 ====
Rank	Player (seed)	W	L	T	Pts	Match results		
1	(Spain) Jon Rahm (1)	2	1	0	2	Beat Muñoz 4 & 2	Beat Young 5 & 4	Lost to Reed 3 & 2
T2	(United States) Patrick Reed (23)	1	1	1	1.5	Lost to Young 1 down	Tied Muñoz	Beat Rahm 3 & 2
T2	(Colombia) Sebastián Muñoz (58)	1	1	1	1.5	Lost to Rahm 4 & 2	Tied Reed	Beat Young 1 up
4	(United States) Cameron Young (40)	1	2	0	1	Beat Reed 1 up	Lost to Rahm 5 & 4	Lost to Muñoz 1 down

==== Group 2 ====
Rank	Player (seed)	W	L	T	Pts	Match results		
1	(United States) Collin Morikawa (2)	2	0	1	2.5	Beat MacIntyre 2 & 1	Tied García	Beat Kokrak 1 up
2	(Spain) Sergio García (43)	1	1	1	1.5	Beat Kokrak 4 & 3	Tied Morikawa	Lost to MacIntyre 4 & 2
T3	(United States) Jason Kokrak (22)	1	2	0	1	Lost to García 4 & 3	Beat MacIntyre 3 & 2	Lost to Morikawa 1 down
T3	(Scotland) Robert MacIntyre (61)	1	2	0	1	Lost to Morikawa 2 & 1	Lost to Kokrak 3 & 2	Beat García 4 & 2

==== Group 3 ====
Rank	Player (seed)	W	L	T	Pts	Match results		
1	(United States) Will Zalatoris (24)	2	1	0	2	Beat Tringale 5 & 4	Lost to Straka 4 & 2	Beat Hovland 1 up
2	(Norway) Viktor Hovland (3)	2	1	0	2	Beat Straka 1 up	Beat Tringale 2 & 1	Lost to Zalatoris 1 down
T3	(United States) Cameron Tringale (45)	1	2	0	1	Lost to Zalatoris 5 & 4	Lost to Hovland 2 & 1	Beat Straka 5 & 3
T3	(Austria) Sepp Straka (63)	1	2	0	1	Lost to Hovland 1 down	Beat Zalatoris 4 & 2	Lost to Tringale 5 & 3

Zalatoris defeated Hovland on the second hole of a sudden-death playoff with a birdie.

==== Group 4 ====
Rank	Player (seed)	W	L	T	Pts	Match results		
1	(Republic of Ireland) Séamus Power (42)	2	1	0	2	Beat Im 5 & 4	Beat Cantlay 5 & 4	Lost to Mitchell 2 & 1
T2	(United States) Patrick Cantlay (4)	1	1	1	1.5	Tied Mitchell	Lost to Power 5 & 4	Beat Im 2 & 1
T2	(United States) Keith Mitchell (62)	1	1	1	1.5	Tied Cantlay	Lost to Im 5 & 3	Beat Power 2 & 1
4	(South Korea) Im Sung-jae (21)	1	2	0	1	Lost to Power 5 & 4	Beat Mitchell 5 & 3	Lost to Cantlay 2 & 1

==== Group 5 ====
Rank	Player (seed)	W	L	T	Pts	Match results		
1	(United States) Scottie Scheffler (5)	2	1	0	2	Beat Poulter 2 & 1	Lost to Fleetwood 2 & 1	Beat Fitzpatrick 5 & 4
2	(England) Matt Fitzpatrick (20)	2	1	0	2	Beat Fleetwood 1 up	Beat Poulter 4 & 2	Lost to Scheffler 5 & 4
T3	(England) Tommy Fleetwood (41)	1	2	0	1	Lost to Fitzpatrick 1 down	Beat Scheffler 2 & 1	Lost to Poulter 4 & 3
T3	(England) Ian Poulter (59)	1	2	0	1	Lost to Scheffler 2 & 1	Lost to Fitzpatrick 4 & 2	Beat Fleetwood 4 & 3

Scheffler defeated Fitzpatrick on the sixth hole of a sudden-death playoff with a birdie.

==== Group 6 ====
Rank	Player (seed)	W	L	T	Pts	Match results		
1	(United States) Kevin Kisner (29)	3	0	0	3	Beat Leishman 4 & 3	Beat List 1 up	Beat Thomas 4 & 3
T2	(United States) Justin Thomas (6)	1	2	0	1	Lost to List 3 & 2	Beat Leishman 5 & 4	Lost to Kisner 4 & 3
T2	(Australia) Marc Leishman (37)	1	2	0	1	Lost to Kisner 4 & 3	Lost to Thomas 5 & 4	Beat List 3 & 2
T2	(United States) Luke List (53)	1	2	0	1	Beat Thomas 3 & 2	Lost to Kisner 1 down	Lost to Leishman 3 & 2

==== Group 7 ====
Rank	Player (seed)	W	L	T	Pts	Match results		
1	(Japan) Takumi Kanaya (56)	2	1	0	2	Lost to Schauffele 3 & 2	Beat Finau 1 up	Beat Herbert 5 & 4
2	(Australia) Lucas Herbert (39)	2	1	0	2	Beat Finau 4 & 3	Beat Schauffele 1 up	Lost to Kanaya 5 & 4
T3	(United States) Xander Schauffele (7)	1	2	0	1	Beat Kanaya 3 & 2	Lost to Herbert 1 down	Lost to Finau 4 & 2
T3	(United States) Tony Finau (18)	1	2	0	1	Lost to Herbert 4 & 3	Lost to Kanaya 1 down	Beat Schauffele 4 & 2

Kanaya defeated Herbert on the first hole of a sudden-death playoff with a par.

==== Group 8 ====
Rank	Player (seed)	W	L	T	Pts	Match results		
1	(United States) Dustin Johnson (8)	3	0	0	3	Beat Hughes 3 & 2	Beat Wolff 4 & 2	Beat Homa 1 up
2	(Canada) Mackenzie Hughes (51)	2	1	0	2	Lost to Johnson 3 & 2	Beat Homa 2 up	Beat Wolff 1 up
3	(United States) Max Homa (30)	1	2	0	1	Beat Wolff 3 & 1	Lost to Hughes 2 down	Lost to Johnson 1 down
4	(United States) Matthew Wolff (38)	0	3	0	0	Lost to Homa 3 & 1	Lost to Johnson 4 & 2	Lost to Hughes 1 down

==== Group 9 ====
Rank	Player (seed)	W	L	T	Pts	Match results		
1	(England) Richard Bland (54)	2	0	1	2.5	Tied DeChambeau	Beat Gooch 1 up	Beat Westwood 2 & 1
2	(United States) Talor Gooch (27)	2	1	0	2	Beat Westwood 3 & 2	Lost to Bland 1 down	Beat DeChambeau 1 up
3	(England) Lee Westwood (47)	1	2	0	1	Lost to Gooch 3 & 2	Beat DeChambeau 1 up	Lost to Bland 2 & 1
4	(United States) Bryson DeChambeau (9)	0	2	1	0.5	Tied Bland	Lost to Westwood 1 down	Lost to Gooch 1 down

==== Group 10 ====
Rank	Player (seed)	W	L	T	Pts	Match results		
1	(Canada) Corey Conners (36)	3	0	0	3	Beat Casey (conceded) (Note: Casey conceded the match against Conners after two holes due to back spasms.)	Beat Oosthuizen 2 & 1	Beat Norén 3 & 2
2	(Sweden) Alex Norén (50)	2	1	0	2	Beat Oosthuizen 1 up	Beat Casey (conceded) (Note: Casey conceded his matches against Norén and Oosthuizen.)	Lost to Conners 3 & 2
3	(South Africa) Louis Oosthuizen (10)	1	2	0	1	Lost to Norén 1 down	Lost to Conners 2 & 1	Beat Casey (conceded)
4	(England) Paul Casey (19)	0	3	0	0	Lost to Conners (conceded)	Lost to Norén (conceded)	Lost to Oosthuizen (conceded)

==== Group 11 ====
Rank	Player (seed)	W	L	T	Pts	Match results		
1	(Australia) Adam Scott (32)	2	0	1	2.5	Beat Rose 2 up	Tied Bradley	Beat Spieth 3 & 2
2	(England) Justin Rose (46)	1	1	1	1.5	Lost to Scott 2 down	Beat Spieth 3 & 2	Tied Bradley
T3	(United States) Jordan Spieth (11)	1	2	0	1	Beat Bradley 2 up	Lost to Rose 3 & 2	Lost to Scott 3 & 2
T3	(United States) Keegan Bradley (60)	0	1	2	1	Lost to Spieth 2 down	Tied Scott	Tied Rose

==== Group 12 ====
Rank	Player (seed)	W	L	T	Pts	Match results		
1	(United States) Billy Horschel (12)	2	0	1	2.5	Beat Lee 3 & 2	Beat Hoge 3 & 2	Tied Pieters
T2	(Belgium) Thomas Pieters (26)	1	1	1	1.5	Beat Hoge 2 & 1	Lost to Lee 1 down	Tied Horschel
T2	(Australia) Min Woo Lee (49)	1	1	1	1.5	Lost to Horschel 3 & 2	Beat Pieters 1 up	Tied Hoge
4	(United States) Tom Hoge (33)	0	2	1	0.5	Lost to Pieters 2 & 1	Lost to Horschel 3 & 2	Tied Lee

==== Group 13 ====
Rank	Player (seed)	W	L	T	Pts	Match results		
1	(England) Tyrrell Hatton (13)	3	0	0	3	Beat Bezuidenhout 3 & 2	Beat Kim 1 up	Beat Berger 2 up
2	(South Korea) Kim Si-woo (48)	2	1	0	2	Beat Berger 2 up	Lost to Hatton 1 down	Beat Bezuidenhout 6 & 4
3	(United States) Daniel Berger (17)	1	2	0	1	Lost to Kim 2 down	Beat Bezuidenhout 2 & 1	Lost to Hatton 2 up
4	(South Africa) Christiaan Bezuidenhout (52)	0	3	0	0	Lost to Hatton 3 & 2	Lost to Berger 2 & 1	Lost to Kim 6 & 4

==== Group 14 ====
Rank	Player (seed)	W	L	T	Pts	Match results		
1	(United States) Kevin Na (25)	2	0	1	2.5	Beat Henley 1 up	Tied McNealy	Beat Niemann 1 up
2	(United States) Maverick McNealy (64)	2	0	1	2.5	Beat Niemann 8 & 6	Tied Na	Beat Henley 2 & 1
3	(Chile) Joaquín Niemann (14)	1	2	0	1	Lost to McNealy 8 & 6	Beat Henley 2 & 1	Lost to Na 1 down
4	(United States) Russell Henley (34)	0	3	0	0	Lost to Na 1 down	Lost to Niemann 2 & 1	Lost to McNealy 2 & 1

Na defeated McNealy on the first hole of a sudden-death playoff with a birdie.

==== Group 15 ====
Rank	Player (seed)	W	L	T	Pts	Match results		
1	(Mexico) Abraham Ancer (15)	2	0	1	2.5	Beat Watson 3 & 1	Tied Harman	Beat Simpson 2 up
2	(United States) Bubba Watson (57)	1	1	1	1.5	Lost to Ancer 3 & 1	Beat Simpson 1 up	Tied Harman
T3	(United States) Webb Simpson (31)	1	2	0	1	Beat Harman 1 up	Lost to Watson 1 down	Lost to Ancer 2 down
T3	(United States) Brian Harman (44)	0	1	2	1	Lost to Simpson 1 down	Tied Ancer	Tied Watson

==== Group 16 ====
Rank	Player (seed)	W	L	T	Pts	Match results		
1	(United States) Brooks Koepka (16)	3	0	0	3	Beat van Rooyen 3 & 2	Beat Varner 2 & 1	Beat Lowry 1 up
2	(United States) Harold Varner III (35)	2	1	0	2	Beat Lowry 2 & 1	Lost to Koepka 2 & 1	Beat van Rooyen 5 & 4
3	(Republic of Ireland) Shane Lowry (28)	1	2	0	1	Lost to Varner 2 & 1	Beat van Rooyen 2 up	Lost to Koepka 1 down
4	(South Africa) Erik van Rooyen (55)	0	3	0	0	Lost to Koepka 3 & 2	Lost to Lowry 2 down	Lost to Varner 5 & 4

=== Final 16 bracket ===
First round March 26 – morning
2	(United States) Collin Morikawa
15	(Mexico) Abraham Ancer	7&6
56	(Japan) Takumi Kanaya
36	(Canada) Corey Conners	5&3
24	(United States) Will Zalatoris	22h
25	(United States) Kevin Na
32	(Australia) Adam Scott
29	(United States) Kevin Kisner	1 up
1	(Spain) Jon Rahm
16	(United States) Brooks Koepka	19h
54	(England) Richard Bland
8	(United States) Dustin Johnson	3&2
5	(United States) Scottie Scheffler	1 up
12	(United States) Billy Horschel
13	(England) Tyrrell Hatton
42	(Republic of Ireland) Séamus Power	4&3

Quarterfinals; March 26 – afternoon
15	(Mexico) Abraham Ancer
36	(Canada) Corey Conners	2 up
24	(United States) Will Zalatoris
29	(United States) Kevin Kisner	4&3
16	(United States) Brooks Koepka
8	(United States) Dustin Johnson	2 up
5	(United States) Scottie Scheffler	3&2
42	(Republic of Ireland) Séamus Power

Semifinals; March 27 – morning
36	(Canada) Corey Conners
29	(United States) Kevin Kisner	2 up
8	(United States) Dustin Johnson
5	(United States) Scottie Scheffler	3&1

Final; March 27 – afternoon
29	(United States) Kevin Kisner
5	(United States) Scottie Scheffler	4&3
Third place
36	(Canada) Corey Conners	3&1
8	(United States) Dustin Johnson

== Prize money breakdown ==
Place	Description	US$
1	Champion	2,100,000
2	Runner-up	1,320,000
3	Third place	852,000
4	Fourth place	685,000
T5	Losing quarter-finalists x 4	386,000
T9	Losing round of 16 x 8	220,000
17	Those with 2.5 points in pool play x 1	164,000
T18	Those with 2 points in pool play x 8	133,875
T26	Those with 1.5 points in pool play x 9	97,111
T35	Those with 1 point in pool play x 23	58,239
T58	Those with 0.5 points in pool play x 2	42,750
T60	Those with 0 points in pool play x 5	41,000
	Total	12,000,000

Prize money for players who did not qualify for the knockout stage was from $164,000 to $40,000. Positions for these players were based on points scored in pool play.
