= TPC San Antonio Championship =

Tournament information
- Location: San Antonio, Texas
- Established: 2020
- Courses: TPC San Antonio (Oaks Course)
- Par: 72
- Length: 7,494 yards (6,853 m)
- Tour: Korn Ferry Tour
- Format: Stroke play
- Prize fund: US$600,000
- Month played: July
- Final year: 2020

Tournament record score
- Aggregate: 272 Davis Riley (2020)
- To par: −16 as above

Final champion
- (United States) Davis Riley

Location map
- Location in the United States Location in Texas

The TPC San Antonio Championship at the Oaks was a golf tournament on the Korn Ferry Tour. The tournament was one of several added to the Korn Ferry Tour schedule in 2020 as part of adjustments due to the COVID-19 pandemic. It was played in July 2020 on the Oaks Course at TPC San Antonio near San Antonio, Texas; the course also hosts the PGA Tour's Valero Texas Open. Davis Riley won the tournament by four strokes over Paul Barjon and Taylor Pendrith; all three would finish the 2020–21 Korn Ferry Tour season inside the top 25 in points, thereby earning promotion to the PGA Tour.

== Winners ==
Year	Winner	Score	To par	Margin of victory	Runners-up
2020	(United States) Davis Riley	272	−16	2 strokes	(France) Paul Barjon (Canada) Taylor Pendrith

== See also ==
- TPC San Antonio Challenge
