= 2021–22 PGA Tour =

Golf tour season

2021–22 PGA Tour season
- Duration: September 16, 2021 – August 28, 2022
- Number of official events: 47 (Note: One further tournament was scheduled but was canceled.)
- Most wins: (United States) Scottie Scheffler (4)
- FedEx Cup: (Northern Ireland) Rory McIlroy
- Money list: (United States) Scottie Scheffler
- PGA Tour Player of the Year: (United States) Scottie Scheffler
- PGA Player of the Year: (Australia) Cameron Smith
- Rookie of the Year: (United States) Cameron Young

The 2021–22 PGA Tour was the 107th season of the PGA Tour, the main professional golf tour in the United States. It was also the 54th season since separating from the PGA of America, and the 16th edition of the FedEx Cup.

== Changes for 2021–22 ==
=== Prize fund ===
The Tour announced more than $100 million in purse increases for the 2021–22 season including:

- Increasing the FedEx Cup bonus pool (from $60 million to $75 million)
- Doubling the regular season bonus pool, known as the Comcast Business Tour Top 10 (from $10 million to $20 million)
- Increasing the Player Impact Program, which rewards players that drive fan engagement (from $40 million to $50 million)
- Introducing the Play15 Bonus program, which rewards every player who makes at least 15 starts with $50,000
- Significant increases in the purses of limited-field events including increasing the Players Championship purse to $20 million

== Response to LIV Golf ==
Preceding the first event of the LIV Golf Invitational Series in London, the PGA Tour announced on June 1, 2022, that they would sanction players who competed in the event. Seventeen PGA Tour members played in the event, including major champions Phil Mickelson, Dustin Johnson, Sergio García, Martin Kaymer, Louis Oosthuizen, Charl Schwartzel and Graeme McDowell, and former world number one Lee Westwood. Nine of the players resigned from the tour. On June 9, the tour announced that all members participating in the first LIV tournament, including those who had resigned, were no longer eligible to compete in tour events or the Presidents Cup.

Seven more PGA Tour members joined LIV Golf for the series' second event in Portland, Oregon, including major champions Brooks Koepka, Bryson DeChambeau, and Patrick Reed (who resigned from the tour). The PGA Tour confirmed their suspensions shortly following the start of that event.

In late July, the tour created a FedExCup Playoffs Eligibility ranking list which did not include the suspended players. Ten players who finished inside the top-125 of the standard FedExCup Standings were excluded; they were Talor Gooch, Jason Kokrak, Matt Jones, Hudson Swafford, Matthew Wolff, Abraham Ancer, Carlos Ortiz, Brooks Koepka, Charles Howell III, and Pat Perez. Three of these (Gooch, Jones and Swafford) failed in their attempt to gain a temporary restraining order to allow them to compete in the playoffs.

== Schedule ==
The following table lists official events during the 2021–22 season.

Date	Tournament	Location	Purse (US$)	Winner(s) (Note: The number in parentheses after each winner's name is the number of PGA Tour events they had won up to and including that tournament. This information is only shown for PGA Tour members.)	OWGR points	Other tours (Note: EUR − European Tour; JPN − Japan Golf Tour.)	Notes
Sep 19	Fortinet Championship	California	7,000,000	(United States) Max Homa (3)	40		
Oct 3	Sanderson Farms Championship	Mississippi	7,000,000	(United States) Sam Burns (2)	36		
Oct 10	Shriners Children's Open	Nevada	7,000,000	(South Korea) Im Sung-jae (2)	56		
Oct 17	CJ Cup	Nevada (Note: Originally planned to return to South Korea. However, due to COVID-19 considerations, the CJ Cup was held in Las Vegas, Nevada for the second consecutive year.)	9,750,000	(Northern Ireland) Rory McIlroy (20)	68		Limited-field event
Oct 24	Zozo Championship	Japan	9,950,000	(Japan) Hideki Matsuyama (7)	40	JPN (Note: Japan Golf Tour unofficial event)	Limited-field event
~~Oct 31~~	WGC-HSBC Champions	China	–	Canceled	–		World Golf Championship
Oct 31	Butterfield Bermuda Championship	Bermuda	6,500,000	(Australia) Lucas Herbert (1)	24		~~Alternate event~~ (Note: With the cancelation of the WGC-HSBC Champions, the Butterfield Bermuda Championship was elevated to a full status event.)
Nov 7	World Wide Technology Championship	Mexico	7,200,000	(Norway) Viktor Hovland (3)	52		
Nov 14	Hewlett Packard Enterprise Houston Open	Texas	7,500,000	(United States) Jason Kokrak (3)	50		
Nov 21	RSM Classic	Georgia	7,200,000	(United States) Talor Gooch (1)	44		
Jan 9	Sentry Tournament of Champions	Hawaii	8,200,000	(Australia) Cameron Smith (4)	62		Winners-only event
Jan 16	Sony Open in Hawaii	Hawaii	7,500,000	(Japan) Hideki Matsuyama (8)	46		
Jan 23	The American Express	California	7,600,000	(United States) Hudson Swafford (3)	50		Pro-Am
Jan 29	Farmers Insurance Open	California	8,400,000	(United States) Luke List (1)	60		
Feb 6	AT&T Pebble Beach Pro-Am	California	8,700,000	(United States) Tom Hoge (1)	36		Pro-Am
Feb 13	WM Phoenix Open	Arizona	8,200,000	(United States) Scottie Scheffler (1)	62		
Feb 20	Genesis Invitational	California	12,000,000	(Chile) Joaquín Niemann (2)	72		Invitational
Feb 27	The Honda Classic	Florida	8,000,000	(Austria) Sepp Straka (1)	42		
Mar 6	Arnold Palmer Invitational	Florida	12,000,000	(United States) Scottie Scheffler (2)	64		Invitational
Mar 6	Puerto Rico Open	Puerto Rico	3,700,000	(United States) Ryan Brehm (1)	24		Alternate event
Mar 14	The Players Championship	Florida	20,000,000	(Australia) Cameron Smith (5)	80		Flagship event
Mar 20	Valspar Championship	Florida	7,800,000	(United States) Sam Burns (3)	56		
Mar 27	WGC-Dell Technologies Match Play	Texas	12,000,000	(United States) Scottie Scheffler (3)	74		World Golf Championship
Mar 27	Corales Puntacana Championship	Dominican Republic	3,700,000	(United States) Chad Ramey (1)	24		Alternate event
Apr 3	Valero Texas Open	Texas	8,600,000	(United States) J. J. Spaun (1)	38		
Apr 10	Masters Tournament	Georgia	15,000,000	(United States) Scottie Scheffler (4)	100		Major championship
Apr 17	RBC Heritage	South Carolina	8,000,000	(United States) Jordan Spieth (13)	58		Invitational
Apr 24	Zurich Classic of New Orleans	Louisiana	8,300,000	(United States) Patrick Cantlay (7) and (United States) Xander Schauffele (5)	n/a		Team event
May 1	Mexico Open	Mexico	7,300,000	(Spain) Jon Rahm (7)	32		New to PGA Tour
May 8	Wells Fargo Championship	Maryland	9,000,000	(United States) Max Homa (4)	44		
May 15	AT&T Byron Nelson	Texas	9,100,000	(South Korea) Lee Kyoung-hoon (2)	52		
May 22	PGA Championship	Oklahoma	15,000,000	(United States) Justin Thomas (15)	100		Major championship
May 29	Charles Schwab Challenge	Texas	8,400,000	(United States) Sam Burns (4)	60		Invitational
Jun 5	Memorial Tournament	Ohio	12,000,000	(United States) Billy Horschel (7)	68		Invitational
Jun 12	RBC Canadian Open	Canada	8,700,000	(Northern Ireland) Rory McIlroy (21)	46		
Jun 19	U.S. Open	Massachusetts	17,500,000	(England) Matt Fitzpatrick (1)	100		Major championship
Jun 26	Travelers Championship	Connecticut	8,300,000	(United States) Xander Schauffele (6)	54		
Jul 3	John Deere Classic	Illinois	7,100,000	(United States) J. T. Poston (2)	24		
Jul 10	Genesis Scottish Open	Scotland	8,000,000	(United States) Xander Schauffele (7)	70	EUR (Note: European Tour Rolex Series)	New to PGA Tour
Jul 10	Barbasol Championship	Kentucky	3,700,000	(United States) Trey Mullinax (1)	24	EUR	Alternate event
Jul 17	The Open Championship	Scotland	14,000,000	(Australia) Cameron Smith (6)	100		Major championship
Jul 17	Barracuda Championship	California	3,700,000	(United States) Chez Reavie (3)	24	EUR	Alternate event
Jul 24	3M Open	Minnesota	7,500,000	(United States) Tony Finau (3)	26		
Jul 31	Rocket Mortgage Classic	Michigan	8,400,000	(United States) Tony Finau (4)	42		
Aug 7	Wyndham Championship	North Carolina	7,300,000	(South Korea) Tom Kim (1)	42		
Aug 14	FedEx St. Jude Championship	Tennessee	15,000,000	(United States) Will Zalatoris (1)	67.19		FedEx Cup playoff event
Aug 21	BMW Championship	Delaware	15,000,000	(United States) Patrick Cantlay (8)	50.59		FedEx Cup playoff event
Aug 28	Tour Championship	Georgia	n/a (Note: The Tour Championship has no stand-alone purse and does not carry official money; the tournament directly determines the assignment of the FedEx Cup bonus pool money, including US$18,000,000 to the winner.)	(Northern Ireland) Rory McIlroy (22)	38.81 (Note: OWGR points at the Tour Championship were awarded based on aggregate scores only (see Tour Championship format). McIlroy had the lowest aggregate score and was awarded with the 38.81 points.)		FedEx Cup playoff event

=== Unofficial events ===
The following events were sanctioned by the PGA Tour, but did not carry FedEx Cup points or official money, nor were wins official.

Date	Tournament	Location	Purse ($)	Winner(s)	OWGR points	Notes
Sep 26	Ryder Cup	Wisconsin	n/a	Team USA	n/a	Team event
Dec 5	Hero World Challenge	Bahamas	3,500,000	(Norway) Viktor Hovland	48	Limited-field event
Dec 12	QBE Shootout	Florida	3,600,000	(United States) Jason Kokrak and (United States) Kevin Na	n/a	Team event

== Location of tournaments ==
PGA Tour sanctioned events (numbered chronologically).

Legend：
600-point event (Major championships & The Players)
550-point event (World Golf Championships, Genesis, Arnold Palmer, Memorial)
500-point event (Regular events)
400-point event (Official team event)
300-point event (Alternate events)
FedEx Cup playoff event

Non FedEx Cup event
PGA Tour sanctioned events in Scotland
PGA Tour sanctioned events in Hawaii
PGA Tour sanctioned events in Japan

== FedEx Cup ==
=== Points distribution ===
The distribution of points for 2021–22 PGA Tour events were as follows:

Finishing position	1st	2nd	3rd	4th	5th	6th	7th	8th	9th	10th	20th	30th	40th	50th	60th
Majors & Players Championship	600	330	210	150	120	110	100	94	88	82	51	32	18	10	6
WGCs, Genesis, Arnold Palmer, and Memorial	550	315	200	140	115	105	95	89	83	78	51	32	18	10	6
Other PGA Tour events	500	300	190	135	110	100	90	85	80	75	45	28	16	8.5	5
Team event (each player)	400	163	105	88	78	68	59	54	50	46	17	5	2	0	0
Alternate events	300	165	105	80	65	60	55	50	45	40	28	17	10	5	3
Playoff events	2000	1200	760	540	440	400	360	340	320	300	180	112	64	34	20

Tour Championship starting score (to par), based on position in the FedEx Cup rankings after the BMW Championship:

Position	1st	2nd	3rd	4th	5th	6th–10th	11th–15th	16th–20th	21st–25th	26th–30th
Starting score	−10	−8	−7	−6	−5	−4	−3	−2	−1	E

=== Final standings ===
For full rankings, see 2022 FedEx Cup Playoffs.

Top 31 in the final FedEx Cup standings following the Tour Championship:

Pos.	Player		Majors & The Players					WGCs, Genesis, API, and Memorial					Top 10s in other PGA Tour events								Regular season points	Playoffs (Note: The top 125 point scorers in the regular season retain their tour card for the following season, and qualify for the FedEx St. Jude Championship. The top 70 points scorers after the FedEx St. Jude Championship qualify for the BMW Championship.)		Total points	Tour C'ship (Note: The top 30 point scorers after the BMW Championship qualify for the Tour Championship. Each player begins with a score adjustment to par determined by their point ranking, the lowest scorers in the Tour Championship in addition to this adjustment win the FedEx Cup.)		Tmts	Money ($m) (Note: In addition to tournament prize money, the top 10 regular season point scorers receive a share of a US$20,000,000 bonus, and the US$75,000,000 FedEx Cup postseason bonus money is distributed based upon standings after the Tour Championship.)		
Pos.	Nat.	Name	Ply	Mas	PGA	USO	Opn	WGC Cha	Gen	API	WGC MP	Mem	1	2	3	4	5	6	7	8	Regular season points	FStJ	BMW	Total points	Start	Final	Tmts	Basic	CB Top10	FedEx Bonus
1	(Northern Ireland)	McIlroy	T33	2nd	8th	T5	3rd	C A N C E L E D	T10	T13	•	T18	1st	5th	1st						2,104	CUT	T8	2,414	−4	−21	16	8.65	1.70	18.00
T2	(South Korea)	Im	T55	T8	•	CUT	T81	C A N C E L E D	T33	T20	T35	T10	1st	T9	T8	T6	T2	T2			1,733	12th	T15	2,201	−4	−20	26	5.57	1.00	5.75
T2	(United States)	Scheffler	T55	1st	CUT	T2	T21	C A N C E L E D	T7	1st	1st	•	4th	T2	1st	2nd					3,556	CUT	T3	4,206	−10	−20	25	14.05	4.00 (Note: Scheffler also won a further US$1,000,000 by topping the Aon Risk Reward Challenge standings.)	5.75
4	(United States)	Schauffele	CUT	CUT	T13	T14	T15	C A N C E L E D	T13	•	T35	T18	T3	1st	T5	1st	1st				2,153	T57	T3	2,825	−6	−18	21	7.43	2.20	4.00
T5	(United States)	Homa	T13	T48	T13	T47	CUT	C A N C E L E D	T10	T17	T35	T5	1st	1st							1,625	T42	T23	1,818	−2	−17	24	5.29		2.75
T5	(United States)	Thomas	T33	T8	1st	T37	T53	C A N C E L E D	6th	•	T35	•	3rd	T5	T8	T3	T5	3rd			1,783	T13	T52	2,025	−3	−17	21	6.83	1.20	2.75
T7	(United States)	Cantlay	CUT	T39	CUT	T14	T8	C A N C E L E D	T33	•	T26	T3	4th	9th	T4	2nd	2nd	1st	T4	T2	2,108	T57	1st	4,129	−8	−16	20	9.37	2.00	1.75
T7	(Austria)	Straka	T9	T30	78th	CUT	CUT	C A N C E L E D	T15	CUT	T35	T45	1st	T3							909	2nd	T28	2,224	−4	−16	33	4.72		1.75
9	(United States)	Finau	CUT	T35	T30	CUT	T28	C A N C E L E D	T33	•	T35	•	T2	T4	2nd	1st	1st				1,912	T5	T28	2,376	−4	−15	25	6.12	1.40	1.25
10	(United States)	Hoge	T33	T39	T9	CUT	CUT	C A N C E L E D	CUT	T32	T58	CUT	T4	2nd	1st	T4					1,424	CUT	T48	1,459	−1	−14	32	4.31		1.00
T11	(Japan)	Matsuyama	•	T14	T60	4th	T68	C A N C E L E D	T39	T20	•	DQ	T6	1st	1st	T8	T3				1,697	•	T35	1,765	−2	−13	21	5.78		0.93
T11	(Chile)	Niemann	T22	T35	T23	T47	T53	C A N C E L E D	1st	•	T35	T3	T5								1,228	T13	T8	1,750	−2	−13	24	5.08		0.93
T13	(United States)	Spieth	CUT	CUT	T34	T37	T8	C A N C E L E D	T26	•	T35	T18	2nd	1st	2nd	T7	T10				1,574	CUT	T19	1,750	−2	−12	22	5.02		0.83
T13	(United States)	Wise	T50	•	T23	T27	T34	C A N C E L E D	T67	T17	•	2nd	T5	T6							952	T31	T15	1,241	E	−12	24	3.45		0.83
T15	(England)	Fitzpatrick	CUT	T14	T5	1st	T21	C A N C E L E D	•	T9	T18	CUT	T6	T10	T5	T2	T10	T6			1,596	T5	T48	1,980	−3	−11	20	7.01		0.72
T15	(Norway)	Hovland	T9	T27	T41	CUT	T4	C A N C E L E D	T4	T2	T18	T51	1st								1,314	T20	T35	1,535	−2	−11	21	4.87		0.72
T15	(United States)	Poston	CUT	•	•	•	CUT	C A N C E L E D	CUT	•	•	T37	T3	T9	T2	1st					1,146	T20	T35	1,368	E	−11	30	3.29		0.72
T15	(Spain)	Rahm	T55	T27	T48	T12	T34	C A N C E L E D	T21	T17	T9	T10	2nd	T3	T10	1st					1,449	T5	T8	2,108	−3	−11	19	5.25		0.72
19	(United States)	Young	CUT	CUT	T3	CUT	2nd	C A N C E L E D	T2	T13	T35	T60	T2	T3	T2	T2					1,774	T31	T23	1,997	−3	−10	25	6.52	1.10	0.66
20	(Australia)	Ca. Smith	1st	T3	T13	CUT	1st	C A N C E L E D	T33	•	•	T13	T9	T4	1st	T10					2,335	T13	•	2,548	−4	−9	18	10.11	3.00	0.64
T21	(United States)	Harman	T63	CUT	T34	T43	T6	C A N C E L E D	•	•	T35	T18	T3	T5	T9	T8					694	T3	T35	1,412	−1	−8	27	3.23		0.60
T21	(United States)	Horschel	WD	43	68th	CUT	T21	C A N C E L E D	•	T2	T9	1st	T6	2nd							1,377	CUT	T35	1,471	−1	−8	22	4.94		0.60
T21	(United States)	Morikawa	CUT	5th	T55	T5	CUT	C A N C E L E D	T2	•	T9	CUT	2nd	T7	T5						1,089	T5	T44	1,481	−1	−8	19	4.84		0.60
24	(United States)	Burns	T26	CUT	T20	T27	T42	C A N C E L E D	CUT	T9	•	•	1st	T5	T7	1st	2nd	1st	T4		2,275	T20	T19	2,605	−5	−7	24	7.07	2.40	0.57
25	(Australia)	Scott	CUT	T48	CUT	T14	T15	C A N C E L E D	T4	T26	T9	T67	T5								551	T5	T5	1,299	E	−4	20	2.91		0.55
26	(Canada)	Conners	T26	T6	CUT	CUT	T28	C A N C E L E D	CUT	T11	3rd	T13	6th								936	T28	T5	1,454	−1	−3	25	3.88		0.54
27	(South Korea)	Lee	T55	CUT	T41	T37	CUT	C A N C E L E D	T26	T42	•	T53	1st								853	T20	T5	1,406	E	−1	28	3.35		0.53
28	(United States)	Theegala	CUT	•	•	•	T34	C A N C E L E D	T48	CUT	•	T5	T8	T3	T7	T2					886	T13	T15	1,307	E	+1	32	3.12		0.52
29	(United States)	Stallings	T42	•	CUT	CUT	•	C A N C E L E D	CUT	CUT	•	CUT	T6	T5	T4	T8	T4	T10			852	CUT	2nd	2,052	−3	+3	31	3.93		0.51
T30	(United States)	Gooch (Note: Gooch was suspended from the tour and deemed ineligible for the FedEx Cup Playoffs or bonus pool having joined LIV Golf; he was 29th on the points list entering the Tour Championship.)	CUT	T14	T20	CUT	T34	C A N C E L E D	CUT	T7	T18	•	T4	T5	1st						1,302	•	•	1,302	•	•	22	3.72		
T30	(United States)	Zalatoris	T26	T5	2nd	T2	T28	C A N C E L E D	T26	T38	T5	T5	T10	T2	T6	2nd	T4				1,680	1st	WD	3,680	−7	•	24	9.37		0.50

Win
Top 10
Made cut
Missed cut
Withdrew or disqualified
• Did not play

== Money list ==
The money list was based on prize money won during the season, calculated in U.S. dollars.

Position	Player	Prize money ($)
1	(United States) Scottie Scheffler	14,046,910
2	(Australia) Cameron Smith	10,107,897
3	(United States) Will Zalatoris	9,405,082
4	(United States) Patrick Cantlay	9,369,605
5	(Northern Ireland) Rory McIlroy	8,654,566
6	(United States) Xander Schauffele	7,427,299
7	(United States) Sam Burns	7,073,986
8	(England) Matt Fitzpatrick	7,012,672
9	(United States) Justin Thomas	6,829,576
10	(United States) Cameron Young	6,520,598

== Awards ==
Award	Winner	Ref.
PGA Tour Player of the Year (Jack Nicklaus Trophy)	(United States) Scottie Scheffler	
PGA Player of the Year	(Australia) Cameron Smith	
Rookie of the Year (Arnold Palmer Award)	(United States) Cameron Young	
Scoring leader (PGA Tour – Byron Nelson Award)	(Northern Ireland) Rory McIlroy	
Scoring leader (PGA – Vardon Trophy)	(Northern Ireland) Rory McIlroy	

== See also ==
- 2021 in golf
- 2022 in golf
- 2022 Korn Ferry Tour
- 2022 PGA Tour Champions season
