= TPC San Antonio Challenge =

Tournament information
- Location: San Antonio, Texas
- Established: 2020
- Courses: TPC San Antonio (Canyons Course)
- Par: 72
- Length: 7,097 yards (6,489 m)
- Tour: Korn Ferry Tour
- Format: Stroke play
- Prize fund: US$600,000
- Month played: July
- Final year: 2020

Tournament record score
- Aggregate: 263 David Lipsky (2020)
- To par: −25 as above

Final champion
- (United States) David Lipsky

Location map
- Location in the United States Location in Texas

The TPC San Antonio Challenge at the Canyons was a golf tournament on the Korn Ferry Tour. The tournament was one of several added to the Korn Ferry Tour schedule in 2020 as part of adjustments due to the COVID-19 pandemic. It was played in July 2020 on the Canyons Course at TPC San Antonio near San Antonio, Texas. David Lipsky won the tournament by four strokes over Taylor Pendrith; both would finish the 2020–21 Korn Ferry Tour season inside the top 25 in points, thereby earning promotion to the PGA Tour.

== Winners ==
Year	Winner	Score	To par	Margin of victory	Runner-up
2020	(United States) David Lipsky	263	−25	4 strokes	(Canada) Taylor Pendrith

== See also ==
- TPC San Antonio Championship
