= Ted Scott (caddie) =

American golf caddie

- Born: Los Angeles, California, U.S.
- Occupation: Golf caddie
- Years active: 1999–present
- Known for: Longtime caddie for Bubba Watson and Scottie Scheffler
- Spouse: Melanie Scott (married 2003 - present)
- Children: 2
- Website: https://jtedscott.com/

Ted Scott is an American professional golf caddie who has worked on the PGA Tour since 1999. After early stints with Grant Waite and Paul Azinger, he spent nearly 15 years caddying for Bubba Watson, with whom he won 12 Tour events including the Masters Tournament in 2012 and 2014. He joined Scottie Scheffler in November 2021 and the two have won 19 Tour events together including four major championships, and an Olympic gold medal at the 2024 Paris Games. Scott is also known for his Christian faith and community involvement in Louisiana.

== Early life ==
He was born in Los Angeles, California, and grew up in Lafayette, Louisiana, where he attended Comeaux High School. He learned the game from his grandfather during summer visits to Texas. He also played with his father who was a career pharmaceutical salesman.

He briefly attended McNeese State University in Lake Charles, Louisiana and considered walking on at University of Louisiana at Lafayette before becoming interested in professional foosball. He did not play golf for three years and developed into an accomplished foosball player, winning the amateur doubles world foosball championship in 1994. He also finished second in singles.

He returned to golf and attempted a professional career in coaching and on the mini-tour circuit. When the Nike Tour came to Lafayette in 1999, he failed to qualify for the tournament and ended up caddying for Grant Waite.

== Caddying career ==
In 1999, he failed to qualify for the Web.com Tour's Louisiana Open at Le Triomphe Country Club, and then began his first professional caddying job for Grant Waite in the tournament. He worked for Waite from 2000 until 2003. Waite earned more than one million dollars on the PGA Tour for the only time in his career. From 2003 until 2005, he worked for Paul Azinger who he met at a PGA Tour Bible study class. In 2005, he caddied for Olin Browne including the 2005 U.S. Open at Pinehurst No. 2, where Browne finished tied for 10th and played the final round with the winner Michael Campbell.

=== Bubba Watson ===
In 2006, he began caddying for Bubba Watson. Ben Crane first introduced the two. They met through the PGA Tour Bible study. At the time, Watson was an emerging player on the PGA Tour. Their first tournament together was the Deutsche Bank Championship in Boston in 2007 where Watson finished 12th overall.

In 2013, Watson berated Scott after he hit a shot in the water. After the blowup, Scott took the blame for the incident. After the incident, some people on social media sided with Scott and started a #PrayforTedScott. The pair later put out a video making fun of the incident with Scott yelling at Watson.

Scott and Watson won two majors together. In 2012, Watson won the 2012 Masters Tournament with Scott on the bag in a playoff where he hit a shot from the woods, which set up a birdie and the win. He also helped Watson win the 2014 Masters Tournament.

In 2014, Scott attempted to qualify for the Zurich Classic of New Orleans. He shot under par but did not qualify.

Scott and Watson ended their partnership after nearly fifteen years together and 12 wins on the PGA Tour. During their partnership, the two were very close friends. Watson said the split was mutual and driven in part by Watson's injuries and desire for Scott to work with a younger player for the long term.

=== Scottie Scheffler ===
Scott began working for Scheffler in November 2021. Scott said he was unsure about working for Scheffler because of his on-course attitude, which he had witnessed, but Scheffler admitted it was fair feedback and said he was willing to improve. He prayed with his family and decided to take the job.

Scheffler's first PGA Tour win came at the 2022 WM Phoenix Open. Scheffler went on to win two more events in the following months before his first major title at the 2022 Masters Tournament. Scott has been filmed for Netflix's Full Swing (2023 TV series). Scheffler won the 2024 Masters Tournament and the men's individual gold medal at the 2024 Summer Olympics in Paris. Watson has praised Scott's work with Scheffler.

At the 2024 PGA Championship, he learned via a text message that Scheffler had been arrested outside the tournament and initially felt concern and confusion. He was impressed by how Scheffler handled the aftermath.

In 2025, Scheffler and Scott won two major championships: the 2025 PGA Championship and the 2025 Open Championship. Scheffler was also named PGA Tour Player of the Year. Scott got into a heated exchange with Francesco Molinari during the 2025 Ryder Cup and later apologized for the incident.

Scott has earned millions of dollars for his work with Scheffler. They opened the 2026 season with a win at The American Express, Scheffler's 20th career PGA Tour title with Scott on the bag for 19 of them.

== Personal life ==
Scott is married and has two children. He missed a day during the 2024 PGA Championship to attend his daughter's high school graduation. In 2025, his 10 year old nephew sustained a severe injury, which he described during his "Sunday Sermon" as "probably the hardest thing I've ever walked through in my entire life." After the incident, he left Scheffler during the final round of the 2025 St. Jude Championship. Scott returned for the Tour Championship and players wore yellow ribbons to support him and his family. It was later revealed that his nephew was shot in the head in a post-basketball game altercation that left him paralyzed below the neck. Scott and his family provide him full-time care and he lives in a converted room in their home. The juvenile accused of the shooting is being prosecuted.

=== Christianity ===
He embraced Christianity in 2002 after conversations with his brother-in-law. His partnership with Watson was rooted in their shared Christian faith, through Bible study and prayers. He encouraged Watson's spiritual development. He first met Scheffler through a Bible study. When requesting Scott to be his caddie, Scheffler said "I really want to work with a Christian. That's how I try to live my life." After Scheffler won the Masters in 2022, he said of Scott: "I respect him so much just as a person. He's a man of faith, and I love him." Scott sees his identity through faith not golf.

=== Community work ===
In 2020, after Hurricane Laura made landfall on Louisiana, Scott and his family volunteered in recovery efforts. They volunteered through Our Savior's Church and went on work group trips. He described "Complete devastation" in Lake Charles, Louisiana. In September 2020, he helped a golf clinic in Lafayette to raise money and assist survivors in southwest Louisiana areas affected by the hurricane.

He is involved in supporting community organizations in Louisiana, including a youth mentorship program called Hope for Opelousas and a church ministry called Harvest Center Church in Lafayette founded by a former gang member turned pastor. He also runs popular social media videos called "Sunday Sermons" and co-hosts an annual faith and golf retreat called "Who's Your Caddie?" He has partnered with Keon Coleman to support Hope for Opelousas.
