= Sam Burns =

American professional golfer (born 1996)

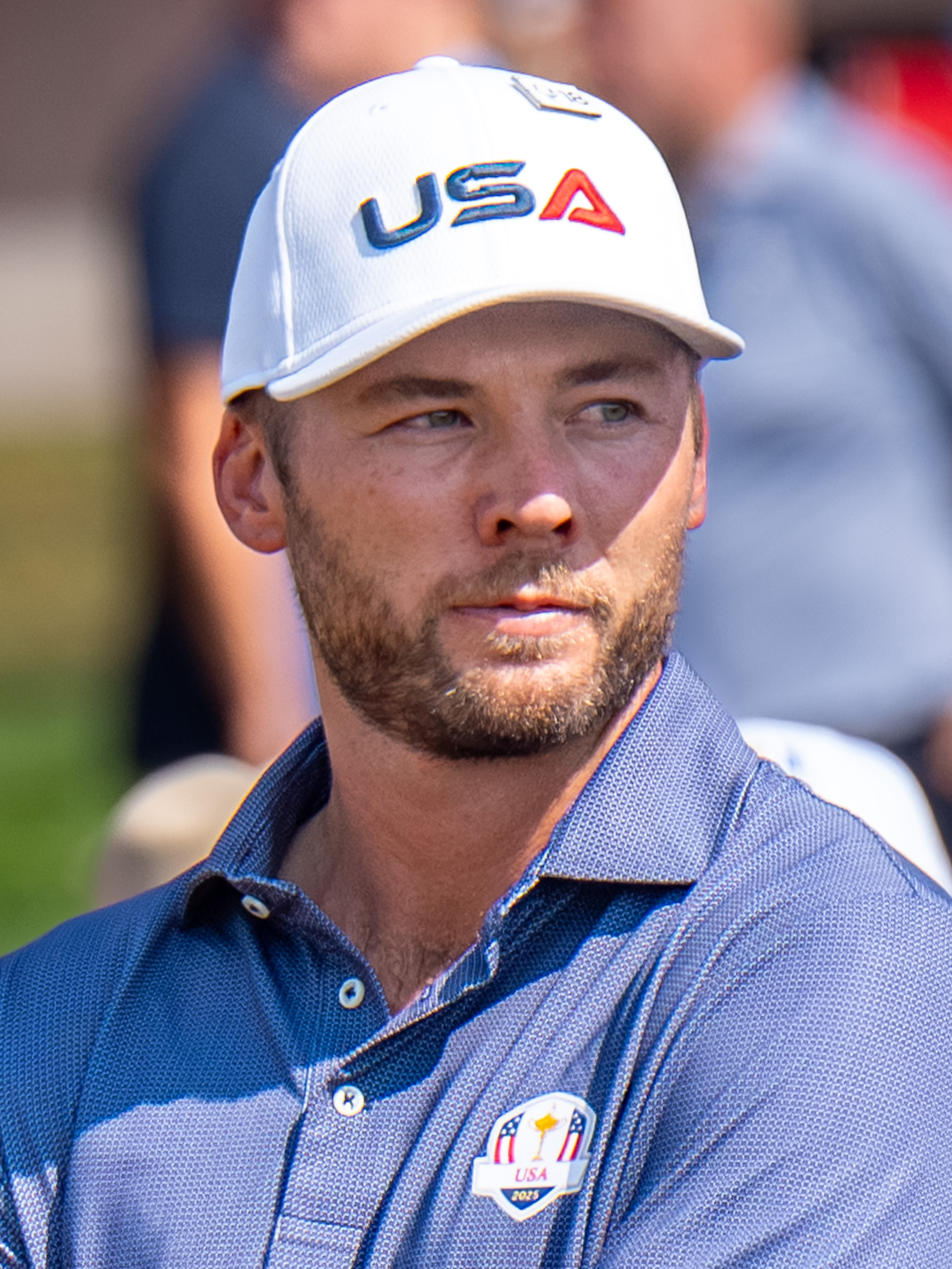
- Burns at the 2025 Ryder Cup

Personal information
- Full name: Samuel Holland Burns
- Nationality: United States
- Born: July 23, 1996 (age 30) Shreveport, Louisiana, U.S.
- Height: 6 ft 1 in (1.85 m)
- Weight: 185 lb (84 kg; 13.2 st)
- Spouse: Caroline Campbell (m. 2019)
- Children: 2

Career
- Sport: Golf
- College: Louisiana State University
- Turned professional: 2017
- Current tour: PGA Tour
- Former tour: Web.com Tour
- Professional wins: 6
- Highest ranking: 7 (August 16, 2026) (as of October 25, 2026)

Number of wins by tour
- PGA Tour: 5
- European Tour: 1
- Korn Ferry Tour: 1

Best results in major championships
- Masters Tournament: T7: 2026
- PGA Championship: T19: 2025
- U.S. Open: 2nd: 2026
- The Open Championship: 3rd: 2026

Samuel Holland Burns (born July 23, 1996) is an American professional golfer who plays on the PGA Tour. He played his college golf at Louisiana State University. He has won five times on the PGA Tour.

== Amateur career ==
Burns was born in Shreveport, Louisiana to Todd and Beth Burns. During his prep career at Calvary Baptist Academy, he was a three-time individual state champion. He was named AJGA Rolex Junior Player of the Year in 2014, a year where he won the Rolex Tournament of Champions in June, the Junior PGA Championship in August, and was on the victorious United States Junior Ryder Cup team. Burns played in his first PGA Tour event at the 2015 Valero Texas Open after receiving an exemption into the tournament following his Junior PGA Championship win in the previous year. He shot a first round 89 on a day where winds gusted to 45 MPH. Burns missed the cut and finished the tournament 22 over par. Burns played college golf at Louisiana State University, where he won four tournaments in 15 collegiate starts during his sophomore season. He was named a first-team All-American and was the NCAA Division I Jack Nicklaus National Player of the Year for the 2016–17 season. Burns represented the United States on the winning 2017 Arnold Palmer Cup team and he qualified for the PGA Tour's 2017 Barbasol Championship, where he finished T6.

== Professional career ==
In October 2017, Burns made his PGA Tour debut as a professional at the Sanderson Farms Championship. After finishing T43, he played a week later at the Shriners Hospitals for Children Open and finished T20. Burns earned guaranteed starts for the first 12 Web.com Tour events of the 2018 season with his T10 finish at the final stage of the Web.com Tour Qualifying Tournament. He finished T2 at the Colombia Championship in February 2018. Burns finished T7 at the Honda Classic with Tiger Woods as his playing partner in the final round, earning Burns entry into the Valspar Championship, where he finished T12. Burns earned his first professional win at the 2018 Savannah Golf Championship on the Web.com Tour when he birdied each of the final three holes to defeat Roberto Castro by one stroke. He gained a place on the PGA Tour at the end of the 2018 Web.com season.

Burns has played on the PGA Tour since the start of the 2018–19 season. In February 2021, he finished solo third place at the Genesis Invitational, one shot outside of the playoff with Tony Finau and Max Homa, Homa being the eventual winner. Burns held the solo lead at the end of each of the first three rounds but was ultimately caught on the back 9 during the final round. In May, Burns won the Valspar Championship for his first PGA Tour victory. Burns shot a final round 68 to win by three strokes over Keegan Bradley. Two weeks later Burns finished runner-up to K.H. Lee at the AT&T Byron Nelson.

On October 3, 2021, Burns won his second PGA Tour title at the Sanderson Farms Championship in Jackson, Mississippi. On March 20, 2022, Burns won his second consecutive Valspar Championship title, beating Davis Riley in a playoff. On May 29, 2022, Burns won the Charles Schwab Challenge after making a 38-foot birdie putt in a playoff against Scottie Scheffler. Burns overcame a seven stroke deficit to win, matching Nick Price in 1994 for largest comeback in a final round to win at Colonial Country Club.

Burns qualified for the U.S. team at the 2022 Presidents Cup; he tied two and lost three of the five matches he played.

In March 2023, Burns won the WGC-Dell Technologies Match Play, defeating Cameron Young 6 and 5 in the championship match.

Burns was selected as one of Zach Johnson's six captain's picks for the 2023 Ryder Cup, which would mark Burns's first appearance in the event.

In September 2023, Burns played on the U.S. team in the 2023 Ryder Cup at Marco Simone Golf and Country Club in Guidonia, Rome, Italy. The European team won 16.5–11.5 and Burns went 1–2–0 including a loss in his Sunday singles match against Rory McIlroy.

In June 2025, Burns was runner-up at the RBC Canadian Open, losing in a playoff to Ryan Fox. The following week, Burns held the 54-hole lead at the 2025 U.S. Open. He shot an 8-over 78 in the final round to finish tied-7th.

== Personal life ==
Burns is a Christian. He is married to Caroline Burns. They welcomed their first child, a son named Bear, in 2024.

Burns has been a supporter of Compassion International's "Fill the Stadium" initiative, an initiative "which seeks to provide food, medical supplies and other forms of support to children and their families during the COVID-19 pandemic."

== Amateur wins ==
- 2014 AJGA Rolex Tournament of Champions, Junior PGA Championship
- 2016 David Toms Intercollegiate, Sun Bowl Western Refining College All-America Golf Classic
- 2017 Louisiana Classics, NCAA Baton Rouge Regional

== Professional wins (6) ==
=== PGA Tour wins (5) ===
Legend
World Golf Championships (1)
Designated events (1) (Note: The 2023 WGC-Dell Technologies Match Play was also a designated event.)
Other PGA Tour (4)

No.	Date	Tournament	Winning score	To par	Margin of victory	Runner(s)-up
1	May 2, 2021	Valspar Championship	67-63-69-68=267	−17	3 strokes	(United States) Keegan Bradley
2	Oct 3, 2021	Sanderson Farms Championship	68-66-65-67=266	−22	1 stroke	(United States) Nick Watney, (United States) Cameron Young
3	Mar 20, 2022	Valspar Championship (2)	64-67-67-69=267	−17	Playoff	(United States) Davis Riley
4	May 29, 2022	Charles Schwab Challenge	71-68-67-65=271	−9	Playoff	(United States) Scottie Scheffler
5	Mar 26, 2023	WGC-Dell Technologies Match Play	6 and 5			(United States) Cameron Young

PGA Tour playoff record (2–2)

No.	Year	Tournament	Opponent(s)	Result
1	2021	WGC-FedEx St. Jude Invitational	(Mexico) Abraham Ancer, (Japan) Hideki Matsuyama	Ancer won with birdie on second extra hole
2	2022	Valspar Championship	(United States) Davis Riley	Won with birdie on second extra hole
3	2022	Charles Schwab Challenge	(United States) Scottie Scheffler	Won with birdie on first extra hole
4	2025	RBC Canadian Open	(New Zealand) Ryan Fox	Lost to birdie on fourth extra hole

=== Web.com Tour wins (1) ===
No.	Date	Tournament	Winning score	To par	Margin of victory	Runner-up
1	Apr 1, 2018	Savannah Golf Championship	72-65-65-65=267	−21	1 stroke	(United States) Roberto Castro

== Results in major championships ==
Results not in chronological order in 2020.

Tournament	2016	2017	2018
Masters Tournament			
U.S. Open	CUT		T41
The Open Championship			
PGA Championship			

Tournament	2019	2020	2021	2022	2023	2024	2025	2026
Masters Tournament				CUT	T29	CUT	T46	T7
PGA Championship	T29		WD	T20	CUT	CUT	T19	T26
U.S. Open			CUT	T27	T32	T9	T7	2
The Open Championship		NT	T76	T42	CUT	T31	T45	3

Top 10
Did not play

CUT = missed the half-way cut
"T" indicates a tie for a place
WD = withdrew
NT = no tournament due to COVID-19 pandemic

=== Summary ===
Tournament	Wins	2nd	3rd	Top-5	Top-10	Top-25	Events	Cuts made
Masters Tournament	0	0	0	0	1	1	5	3
PGA Championship	0	0	0	0	0	2	7	4
U.S. Open	0	1	0	1	3	3	8	6
The Open Championship	0	0	1	1	1	1	6	5
Totals	0	1	1	2	5	7	26	18

- Most consecutive cuts made – 10 (2024 U.S. Open – 2026 Open Championship, current)
- Longest streak of top-10s – 2 (2026 U.S. Open – 2026 Open Championship, current)

== Results in The Players Championship ==
Tournament	2021	2022	2023	2024	2025	2026
The Players Championship	CUT	T26	T35	T45	CUT	T13

CUT = missed the halfway cut
"T" indicates a tie for a place

== World Golf Championships ==
=== Wins (1) ===
Year	Championship	54 holes	Winning score	Margin	Runner-up
2023	WGC-Dell Technologies Match Play	n/a	6 and 5		(United States) Cameron Young

=== Results timeline ===
Tournament	2021	2022	2023
Championship			
Match Play			1
Invitational	T2		
Champions	NT^{1}	NT^{1}	

^{1}Canceled due to COVID-19 pandemic

Win
Top 10
Did not play

"T" = Tied
NT = No tournament
Note that the Championship and Invitational were discontinued from 2022. The Champions was discontinued from 2023.

== U.S. national team appearances ==
Amateur

- Junior Ryder Cup: 2014 (winners)
- Arnold Palmer Cup: 2017 (winners)

Professional

- Presidents Cup: 2022 (winners), 2024 (winners), 2026 (winners)
- Ryder Cup: 2023, 2025

== See also ==
- 2018 Web.com Tour Finals graduates
