= 2020–21 PGA Tour =

Golf tour season

2020–21 PGA Tour season
- Duration: September 10, 2020 – September 5, 2021
- Number of official events: 50 (Note: A further two tournaments were scheduled but were canceled.)
- Most wins: (United States) Patrick Cantlay (4)
- FedEx Cup: (United States) Patrick Cantlay
- Money list: (Spain) Jon Rahm
- PGA Tour Player of the Year: (United States) Patrick Cantlay
- PGA Player of the Year: (Spain) Jon Rahm
- Rookie of the Year: (United States) Will Zalatoris

The 2020–21 PGA Tour was the 106th season of the PGA Tour, the main professional golf tour in the United States. It was also the 53rd season since separating from the PGA of America, and the 15th edition of the FedEx Cup.

== Changes for 2020–21 ==
Because of rescheduling during the 2019–20 season due to the COVID-19 pandemic, six major championships occurred during the timeframe of the 2020–21 season, with two editions of both the U.S. Open and Masters Tournament, as well as the 2020 Summer Olympics. As such, the PGA Tour marketed this season as a "super season".

=== Membership changes ===
As a result of changes made due to COVID-19 pandemic, there were several changes to membership criteria for the 2020–21 season:

- The 2020–21 season and the preceding 2019–20 season were regarded as one season for exemption purposes. This meant that all players exempt for 2019–20 retained the same exemption status for 2020–21, and existing exemptions for tournament and FedEx Cup winners were extended by one season.
- With the 2020 Korn Ferry Tour season having been extended through 2021, there were no graduates to the PGA Tour for 2020–21. However the leading 10 players in the Korn Ferry Tour points standings through the 2020 Korn Ferry Tour Championship were granted exemption to play in the Puerto Rico Open, the Corales Puntacana Resort and Club Championship, the Barbasol Championship and the Barracuda Championship during 2021.

=== Tournament changes ===
==== Field changes ====
- Following the cancellation of ten tournaments due to the COVID-19 pandemic, the PGA Tour announced that for 2021 the field of the Sentry Tournament of Champions would be expanded to include the 30 players qualifying for the 2020 Tour Championship in addition to tournament winners during the 2020 calendar year. The rule eventually made permanent in 2023, and expanded to all 50 BMW Championship players in 2025 as part of limited-field regulations.
- The Puerto Rico Open, the Corales Puntacana Resort and Club Championship in March 2021, the Barbasol Championship and the Barracuda Championship had their fields increased to 132 players.
- Due to concerns with the ongoing pandemic with California regulations, the Pro-Am sections of The American Express and AT&T Pebble Beach Pro-Am were canceled, with the tournaments being held as regular events over two courses instead of the usual three. The Pro-Am at Pebble Beach was realigned to Pebble Beach's PGA Tour Champions event.

==== Status and FedEx Cup points changes ====
- The 2020 editions of the Corales Puntacana Resort and Club Championship and the Bermuda Championship were elevated to full FedEx Cup point events, with winners earning a 2021 Masters Tournament invitation. The Corales Puntacana Resort and Club Championship, held twice during the season, reverted to alternate event status in March 2021, when it was held opposite the WGC-Dell Technologies Match Play.
- The Genesis Invitational, Arnold Palmer Invitational and the Memorial Tournament offered 550 Fedex Cup points, increased from 500 points, the same as the World Golf Championships.
- The first two playoff events, The Northern Trust and the BMW Championship, reverted to four times the points of regular events, having been reduced to three times in the 2019–20 season after several tournaments were canceled.

==== Scheduling change ====
- The Valspar Championship, which since 2007 had been held in March as part of a run of tournaments in Florida, was moved to late April, finishing on May 2.

==== No longer on the schedule ====
- The 2020 edition of A Military Tribute at The Greenbrier was canceled; the PGA Tour and the Greenbrier Resort also agreed to cancel the remainder of their contract, which had been set to end in 2026.
- The 2020 edition of the WGC-HSBC Champions was canceled due to the COVID-19 pandemic.
- On March 9, 2021, it was announced that the RBC Canadian Open had been canceled due to the pandemic; it had also been canceled in 2020.

==== Relocated tournaments ====
Three of the major championships, the first two FedEx Cup playoff events and the RBC Canadian Open are routinely played at a different host course each year. For several other tournaments with regular host courses, there was also a change in venue for the 2020–21 season, some of them temporary.

- The Houston Open moved to Memorial Park Golf Course having been held at the Golf Club of Houston since 2003, and the AT&T Byron Nelson moved to TPC Craig Ranch having been held at Trinity Forest Golf Club since 2018.
- The Wells Fargo Championship, intended to be moved to a temporary host venue at TPC Potomac at Avenel Farm, remained at its regular home of Quail Hollow Club in 2021; this was due to the Presidents Cup that was to be played at Quail Hollow being postponed until 2022.
- The CJ Cup was relocated from Nine Bridges Golf Club on Jeju Island, South Korea to Shadow Creek Golf Course in Las Vegas, Nevada; the move was expected to be for one season only, owing to the COVID-19 travel restrictions.
- The Zozo Championship was played at Sherwood Country Club instead of Japan; the move, due to travel restrictions caused by the COVID-19 pandemic, was expected to be for one season only.

==== Additional tournaments ====
- On March 30, 2021, the tour announced that Congaree Golf Club in Ridgeland, South Carolina would host a new tournament, taking the place of the canceled RBC Canadian Open on the schedule. On April 2, the tournament name was confirmed as the Palmetto Championship.

== Schedule ==
The following table lists official events during the 2020–21 season.

Date	Tournament	Location	Purse (US$)	Winner(s) (Note: The number in parentheses after each winner's name is the number of PGA Tour events they had won up to and including that tournament. This information is only shown for PGA Tour members.)	OWGR points	Other tours (Note: JPN − Japan Golf Tour.)	Notes
Sep 13	Safeway Open	California	6,600,000	(United States) Stewart Cink (7)	26		
Sep 20 (Note: Tournament originally part of the 2019–20 season before rescheduling due to the COVID-19 pandemic.)	U.S. Open	New York	12,500,000	(United States) Bryson DeChambeau (7)	100		Major championship
Sep 27	Corales Puntacana Resort and Club Championship	Dominican Republic	4,000,000	(United States) Hudson Swafford (2)	24		
Oct 4	Sanderson Farms Championship	Mississippi	6,600,000	(Spain) Sergio García (11)	30		
Oct 11	Shriners Hospitals for Children Open	Nevada	7,000,000	(Scotland) Martin Laird (4)	54		
Oct 18	CJ Cup	Nevada	9,750,000	(United States) Jason Kokrak (1)	68		Limited-field event
Oct 25	Zozo Championship	California	8,000,000	(United States) Patrick Cantlay (3)	70	JPN (Note: Japan Golf Tour unofficial event)	Limited-field event
~~Nov 1~~	WGC-HSBC Champions	China	–	Canceled	–		World Golf Championship
Nov 1	Bermuda Championship	Bermuda	4,000,000	(United States) Brian Gay (5)	24		
Nov 8	Vivint Houston Open	Texas	7,000,000	(Mexico) Carlos Ortiz (1)	50		
Nov 15	Masters Tournament	Georgia	11,500,000	(United States) Dustin Johnson (24)	100		Major championship
Nov 22	RSM Classic	Georgia	6,600,000	(United States) Robert Streb (2)	52		
Dec 6	Mayakoba Golf Classic	Mexico	7,200,000	(Norway) Viktor Hovland (2)	46		
Jan 10	Sentry Tournament of Champions	Hawaii	6,700,000	(United States) Harris English (3)	64		Limited-field event
Jan 17	Sony Open in Hawaii	Hawaii	6,600,000	(United States) Kevin Na (5)	50		
Jan 24	The American Express	California	6,700,000	(South Korea) Kim Si-woo (3)	46		~~Pro-Am~~ (Note: Pro-Am canceled due to concerns surrounding the COVID-19 pandemic.)
Jan 31	Farmers Insurance Open	California	7,500,000	(United States) Patrick Reed (9)	58		
Feb 7	Waste Management Phoenix Open	Arizona	7,300,000	(United States) Brooks Koepka (8)	58		
Feb 14	AT&T Pebble Beach Pro-Am	California	7,800,000	(United States) Daniel Berger (4)	30		~~Pro-Am~~
Feb 21	Genesis Invitational	California	9,300,000	(United States) Max Homa (2)	68		Invitational
Feb 28	WGC-Workday Championship	Florida (Note: Moved from Mexico due to the COVID-19 pandemic.)	10,500,000	(United States) Collin Morikawa (4)	74		World Golf Championship
Feb 28	Puerto Rico Open	Puerto Rico	3,000,000	(South Africa) Branden Grace (2)	24		Alternate event
Mar 7	Arnold Palmer Invitational	Florida	9,300,000	(United States) Bryson DeChambeau (8)	58		Invitational
Mar 14	The Players Championship	Florida	15,000,000	(United States) Justin Thomas (14)	80		Flagship event
Mar 21	The Honda Classic	Florida	7,000,000	(Australia) Matt Jones (2)	34		
Mar 28	WGC-Dell Technologies Match Play	Texas	10,500,000	(United States) Billy Horschel (6)	76		World Golf Championship
Mar 28	Corales Puntacana Resort and Club Championship	Dominican Republic	3,000,000	(United States) Joel Dahmen (1)	24		Alternate event
Apr 4	Valero Texas Open	Texas	7,700,000	(United States) Jordan Spieth (12)	38		
Apr 11	Masters Tournament	Georgia	11,500,000	(Japan) Hideki Matsuyama (6)	100		Major championship
Apr 18	RBC Heritage	South Carolina	7,100,000	(United States) Stewart Cink (8)	60		Invitational
Apr 25	Zurich Classic of New Orleans	Louisiana	7,400,000	(Australia) Marc Leishman (6) and (Australia) Cameron Smith (3)	n/a		Team event
May 2	Valspar Championship	Florida	6,900,000	(United States) Sam Burns (1)	54		
May 9	Wells Fargo Championship	North Carolina	8,100,000	(Northern Ireland) Rory McIlroy (19)	60		
May 16	AT&T Byron Nelson	Texas	8,100,000	(South Korea) Lee Kyoung-hoon (1)	48		
May 23	PGA Championship	South Carolina	12,000,000	(United States) Phil Mickelson (45)	100		Major championship
May 30	Charles Schwab Challenge	Texas	7,500,000	(United States) Jason Kokrak (2)	58		Invitational
Jun 6	Memorial Tournament	Ohio	9,300,000	(United States) Patrick Cantlay (4)	68		Invitational
~~Jun 13~~	RBC Canadian Open	Canada	–	Canceled	–		
Jun 13	Palmetto Championship	South Carolina	7,300,000	(South Africa) Garrick Higgo (1)	38		New tournament
Jun 20	U.S. Open	California	12,500,000	(Spain) Jon Rahm (6)	100		Major championship
Jun 27	Travelers Championship	Connecticut	7,400,000	(United States) Harris English (4)	58		
Jul 4	Rocket Mortgage Classic	Michigan	7,500,000	(Australia) Cameron Davis (1)	46		
Jul 11	John Deere Classic	Illinois	6,200,000	(United States) Lucas Glover (4)	28		
Jul 18	The Open Championship	England	11,500,000	(United States) Collin Morikawa (5)	100		Major championship
Jul 18	Barbasol Championship	Kentucky	3,500,000	(Republic of Ireland) Séamus Power (1)	24		Alternate event
Jul 25	3M Open	Minnesota	6,600,000	(United States) Cameron Champ (3)	40		
Aug 8	WGC-FedEx St. Jude Invitational	Tennessee	10,500,000	(Mexico) Abraham Ancer (1)	74		World Golf Championship
Aug 8	Barracuda Championship	California	3,500,000	(South Africa) Erik van Rooyen (1)	24		Alternate event
Aug 15	Wyndham Championship	North Carolina	6,400,000	(United States) Kevin Kisner (4)	46		
Aug 23	The Northern Trust	New Jersey	9,500,000	(United States) Tony Finau (2)	78		FedEx Cup playoff event
Aug 29	BMW Championship	Maryland	9,500,000	(United States) Patrick Cantlay (5)	72		FedEx Cup playoff event
Sep 5	Tour Championship	Georgia	n/a (Note: The Tour Championship has no stand-alone purse and does not carry official money; the tournament directly determines the assignment of the FedEx Cup bonus pool money, including US$15,000,000 to the winner.)	(United States) Patrick Cantlay (6)	64 (Note: OWGR points at the Tour Championship were awarded based on aggregate scores only (see Tour Championship format). Kevin Na and Jon Rahm tied for the lowest aggregate score and split the assigned points for first and second places, each earning 51.2 points. Cantlay, who tied for fourth-lowest aggregate score, received 15.79 points.)		FedEx Cup playoff event

=== Unofficial events ===
The following events were sanctioned by the PGA Tour, but did not carry FedEx Cup points or official money, nor were wins official.

Date	Tournament	Location	Purse ($)	Winner(s)	OWGR points	Notes
~~Sep 27~~	Ryder Cup	Wisconsin	n/a	Postponed (Note: Postponed to 2021 due to the COVID-19 pandemic.)	n/a	Team event
~~Dec 6~~	Hero World Challenge	Bahamas	–	Canceled	–	Limited-field event
Dec 13	QBE Shootout	Florida	3,600,000	(United States) Harris English and (United States) Matt Kuchar	n/a	Team event
Aug 1	Olympic Games	Japan	n/a	(United States) Xander Schauffele	50	Limited-field event

== Location of tournaments ==
Location of official tournaments of the 2020–21 PGA Tour in the continental United States and Canada.
600-point event (Major championships & The Players)
550-point event (World Golf Championships, Genesis, Arnold Palmer, Memorial)
500-point event (Regular events)
400-point event (Official team event)
300-point event (Alternate events)
FedEx Cup playoff event
Unofficial event
Canceled event
Location of official tournaments of the 2020–21 PGA Tour outside the continental United States and Canada.
600-point event (Major championships & The Players)
550-point event (World Golf Championships)
500-point event (Regular events)
300-point event (Alternate events)
Unofficial event
Canceled event

== FedEx Cup ==
=== Points distribution ===
The distribution of points for 2020–21 PGA Tour events were as follows:

Finishing position	1st	2nd	3rd	4th	5th	6th	7th	8th	9th	10th	20th	30th	40th	50th	60th
Majors & Players Championship	600	330	210	150	120	110	100	94	88	82	51	32	18	10	6
WGCs, Genesis, Arnold Palmer, and Memorial	550	315	200	140	115	105	95	89	83	78	51	32	18	10	6
Other PGA Tour events	500	300	190	135	110	100	90	85	80	75	45	28	16	8.5	5
Team event (each player)	400	163	105	88	78	68	59	54	50	46	17	5	2	0	0
Alternate events	300	165	105	80	65	60	55	50	45	40	28	17	10	5	3
Playoff events	2000	1200	760	540	440	400	360	340	320	300	180	112	64	34	20

Tour Championship starting score (to par), based on position in the FedEx Cup rankings after the BMW Championship:

Position	1st	2nd	3rd	4th	5th	6th–10th	11th–15th	16th–20th	21st–25th	26th–30th
Starting score	−10	−8	−7	−6	−5	−4	−3	−2	−1	E

=== Final standings ===
For full rankings, see 2021 FedEx Cup Playoffs.

Final FedEx Cup standings of the 30 qualifiers for the Tour Championship:

Pos.	Player		Majors & The Players							WGCs, Genesis, Arnold Palmer and Memorial							Top 10s in other PGA Tour events					Regular season points	Playoffs (Note: The top 125 point scorers in the regular season retain their tour card for the following season, and qualify for The Northern Trust. The top 70 points scorers after The Northern Trust qualify for the BMW Championship.)		Total points	Tour C'ship (Note: The top 30 point scorers after the BMW Championship qualify for the Tour Championship. Each player begins with a score adjustment to par determined by their point ranking, the lowest scorers in the Tour Championship in addition to this adjustment win the FedEx Cup.)		Tmts	Money ($m) (Note: In addition to tournament prize money, the top 10 regular season point scorers receive a share of a US$10,000,000 bonus, and the US$60,000,000 FedEx Cup postseason bonus money is distributed based upon standings after the Tour Championship.)		
Pos.	Nat.	Name	20 USO	20 Mas	Ply	21 Mas	PGA	21 USO	Opn	WGC Cha	Gen	WGC Wrk	API	WGC MP	Mem	WGC Inv	1	2	3	4	5	Regular season points	NTr	BMW	Total points	Start	Final	Tmts	Basic	CB Top10	FedEx Bonus
1	(United States)	Cantlay	T43	T17	CUT	CUT	T23	T15	CUT	C A N C E L E D	T15	•	•	T18	1st	T23	T8	1st	2nd	T3		2,056	T11	1st	4,302	−10	−21	24	7.64	1.20	15.00
2	(Spain)	Rahm	T23	T7	T9	T5	T8	1st	T3	C A N C E L E D	T5	T32	•	T5	WD	•	T2	T7	T7	7th		2,003	3rd	T9	3,063	−6	−20	22	7.71	1.00	5.00
3	(United States)	Na	CUT	T13	WD	T12	CUT	CUT	•	C A N C E L E D	T38	T11	T43	T42	•	T23	1st	T2	T2			1,308	T8	T17	1,816	−2	−16	26	3.63		4.00
4	(United States)	Thomas	T8	4th	1st	T21	CUT	T19	T40	C A N C E L E D	CUT	T15	•	T42	T42	T26	T2	3rd				1,758	T4	T22	2,371	−4	−15	23	6.54	0.55	3.00
T5	(Norway)	Hovland	T13	•	CUT	T21	T30	WD	T12	C A N C E L E D	T5	T2	T49	T42	T47	T36	1st	T2	T3	T3		1,717	T43	T17	1,951	−3	−14	24	5.05		2.20
T5	(United States)	Schauffele	5th	T17	CUT	T3	CUT	T7	T26	C A N C E L E D	T15	T39	•	T18	T11	T46	2nd	T5	T2	T2		1,623	T16	T49	1,854	−2	−14	22	5.24		2.20
7	(United States)	DeChambeau	1st	T34	T3	T46	T38	T26	T33	C A N C E L E D	CUT	T22	1st	T42	T18	T8	T8	T7	T9			1,910	T31	2nd	3,189	−7	−13	22	7.43	0.70	1.30
8	(United States)	D. Johnson	T6	1st	T48	CUT	CUT	T19	T8	C A N C E L E D	T8	T54	•	T28	•	T10	T2	T10				1,510	CUT	T6	1,890	−3	−11	21	5.00		1.10
T9	(United States)	Horschel	T38	T38	T58	T50	T23	CUT	T53	C A N C E L E D	•	T2	CUT	1st	67th	T17	T5	T7	T4			1,292	T31	T52	1,397	E	−10	25	4.03		0.89
T9	(Mexico)	Ancer	T56	T13	T22	T26	T8	CUT	T59	C A N C E L E D	CUT	T18	•	T18	•	1st	4th	4th	5th	2nd	4th	1,926	T64	T9	2,241	−4	−10	27	5.82	0.85	0.89
T11	(United States)	Berger	T34	•	T9	CUT	T75	T7	T8	C A N C E L E D	•	T35	•	T18	•	T5	10th	T7	1st	T3		1,444	T56	T26	1,594	E	−8	23	4.26		0.71
T11	(United States)	Finau	T8	T38	CUT	T10	T8	CUT	T15	C A N C E L E D	2nd	14th	•	T28	T32	T34	T8	4th	T2			1,348	1st	T15	3,564	−8	−8	27	5.74		0.71
T11	(United States)	Kokrak	T17	CUT	T9	49th	T49	CUT	T26	C A N C E L E D	T32	T9	T8	T42	•	T34	1st	1st				1,631	CUT	T15	1,847	−2	−8	27	5.12		0.71
T14	(Northern Ireland)	McIlroy	T8	T5	CUT	CUT	T49	T7	T46	C A N C E L E D	CUT	T6	T10	T28	T18	T12	1st					1,291	T43	4th	1,878	−2	−7	21	4.39		0.58
T14	(South Africa)	Oosthuizen	3rd	T23	T41	T26	T2	2nd	T3	C A N C E L E D	•	T6	•	T61	T18	T17	2nd	T8	T2			1,877	•	T38	1,935	−3	−7	21	6.31	0.60	0.58
T14	(Spain)	García	CUT	•	T9	CUT	CUT	T19	T19	C A N C E L E D	CUT	T32	•	T5	•	T26	1st					1,020	CUT	T6	1,400	E	−7	24	3.00		0.58
T14	(Australia)	Ca. Smith	T38	T2	T17	T10	T59	CUT	T33	C A N C E L E D	4th	T11	•	T28	CUT	T5	T4	T9	1st			1,539	2nd	T34	2,821	−5	−7	24	5.85		0.58
T18	(United States)	English	4th	•	•	T21	T64	3rd	T46	C A N C E L E D	•	66th	T26	T42	•	4th	10th	T6	T5	1st	1st	2,039	T31	T26	2,248	−4	−6	26	6.20	1.10	0.53
T18	(United States)	Burns	•	•	CUT	•	WD	CUT	T76	C A N C E L E D	3rd	•	CUT	•	T50	T2	T7	T7	T4	1st	2nd	1,721	T21	8th	2,214	−4	−6	26	5.16	0.50	0.53
T20	(United States)	Spieth	CUT	T46	T48	T3	T30	T19	2nd	C A N C E L E D	T15	•	T4	T9	T18	T12	T4	T3	1st	T9	2nd	2,139	73rd	T34	2,232	−4	−4	25	6.47	1.50	0.50
T20	(South Korea)	Im	22nd	T2	T17	CUT	T17	T35	•	C A N C E L E D	•	T28	T21	T42	CUT	T46	T5	T8	T8			1,185	T16	3rd	2,141	−3	−4	35	4.16		0.50
T22	(Canada)	Conners	CUT	T10	7th	T8	T17	CUT	T15	C A N C E L E D	CUT	•	3rd	T61	T53	T36	T8	T10	T4			1,212	T8	T22	1,684	−1	−3	29	4.01		0.47
T22	(South Africa)	van Rooyen	T23	WD	•	•	CUT	CUT	CUT	C A N C E L E D	•	T37	T57	T9	•	•	T10	1st				648	7th	5th	1,448	E	−3	27	2.21		0.47
T22	(United States)	Scheffler	•	T19	CUT	T18	T8	T7	T8	C A N C E L E D	T20	5th	•	2nd	3rd	14th	T7	T8				1,409	T43	T22	1,608	−1	−3	29	4.51		0.47
25	(United States)	Reed	T13	T10	T22	T8	T17	T19	CUT	C A N C E L E D	•	T9	CUT	T28	5th	T31	1st	T6				1,381	•	•	1,381	E	−2	23	4.02		0.45
T26	(Japan)	Matsuyama	T17	T13	CUT	1st	T23	T26	•	C A N C E L E D	CUT	T15	T18	T42	T62	T2	T2					1,594	T43	T46	1,681	−1	E	27	4.96		0.43
T26	(United States)	Morikawa	CUT	T44	T41	T18	T8	T4	1st	C A N C E L E D	T43	1st	•	T56	2nd	T26	T7	T7	T7			2,171	CUT	T63	2,188	−3	E	23	7.06	2.00	0.43
T26	(United States)	Cink	•	•	CUT	T12	T30	T57	CUT	C A N C E L E D	CUT	•	•	•	T47	T43	1st	T4	1st			1,445	T21	T38	1,656	−1	E	26	3.60		0.43
29	(Chile)	Niemann	T23	CUT	T29	T40	T30	T31	T59	C A N C E L E D	T43	T28	•	T18	CUT	T17	6th	2nd	T2	T8	T2	1,491	T47	T29	1,629	−1	+4	27	3.94		0.41
30	(United States)	Koepka	•	T7	•	CUT	T2	T4	T6	C A N C E L E D	T38	T2	•	•	•	T54	T5	1st	T5			1,562	T31	T22	1,793	−2	•	20	5.20		0.40

Win
Top 10
Made cut
Missed cut
Withdrew
• Did not play

== Money list ==
The money list was based on prize money won during the season, calculated in U.S. dollars.

Position	Player	Prize money ($)
1	(Spain) Jon Rahm	7,705,933
2	(United States) Patrick Cantlay	7,638,805
3	(United States) Bryson DeChambeau	7,426,415
4	(United States) Collin Morikawa	7,059,908
5	(United States) Justin Thomas	6,537,153
6	(United States) Jordan Spieth	6,470,482
7	(South Africa) Louis Oosthuizen	6,306,679
8	(United States) Harris English	6,200,481
9	(Australia) Cameron Smith	5,851,867
10	(Mexico) Abraham Ancer	5,816,565

== Awards ==
Award	Winner	Ref.
PGA Tour Player of the Year (Jack Nicklaus Trophy)	(United States) Patrick Cantlay	
PGA Player of the Year	(Spain) Jon Rahm	
Rookie of the Year (Arnold Palmer Award)	(United States) Will Zalatoris	
Scoring leader (PGA Tour – Byron Nelson Award)	(Spain) Jon Rahm	
Scoring leader (PGA – Vardon Trophy)	(Spain) Jon Rahm	
PGA Tour Courage Award	(United States) Morgan Hoffmann	

=== Player Impact Program (PIP) ===
Tiger Woods finished ahead of Phil Mickelson to win the PIP rankings for 2021. The rankings were based upon Google searches; social media reach; TV broadcast appearances; global media mentions and familiarity of a player's "brand". As winner, he received $8m. Second place received $6m, 3rd to 6th received $3.5m, and 7th to 10th received $3m.

== See also ==
- 2020 in golf
- 2021 in golf
- 2020–21 Korn Ferry Tour
- 2020–21 PGA Tour Champions season
