= GolfTV =

Defunct streaming service

- Country: United States
- Broadcast area: International excluding United States, US Territories, China, Cuba, North and South Korea
- Headquarters: New York City, U.S.

Programming
- Language: English

Ownership
- Owner: Warner Bros. Discovery
- Parent: Warner Bros. Discovery Sports Europe

History
- Launched: January 1, 2019; 7 years ago
- Closed: December 12, 2022; 3 years ago
- Replaced by: Discovery+ HBO Max

Links
- Website: www.golf.tv

GolfTV was an international streaming service owned by Warner Bros. Discovery through its international sports unit and run by its Warner Bros. Discovery GolfTV division, which aired golf tournaments, news and documentaries.

== History ==
In June 2018, Discovery Inc. and the PGA Tour agreed to a US$2 billion, 12-year deal for its media rights outside of the United States. Discovery stated that it planned to establish an international streaming service devoted to these rights. In October 2018, Discovery formed its Discovery Golf division by naming Eurosport executive vice president Alex Kaplan as president and general manager of the division, and officially announced that the service would be known as GolfTV, which would replace PGA Tour Live international.

GolfTV officially launched on January 1, 2019, with PGA Tour events available for users in Australia, Canada, Italy, Japan, Netherlands, Portugal, Russia and Spain. The rights will expand as existing deals with international broadcasters lapse, beginning with Poland and South Korea in 2020, Belgium, China, Germany and South Africa in 2021, Denmark, Finland, India, Norway, Sweden and the United Kingdom in 2022, and France in 2024.

In November 2018, GolfTV announced that it had signed Tiger Woods as a content partner under a multi-year deal. This includes an instructional video series, and a series of events featuring Woods, inspired heavily by his 2018 event The Match: Tiger vs. Phil. The first of these, The Challenge: Japan Skins, was held October 21, 2019, in Japan, and aired in the United States on Golf Channel. With the 2022 merger of Discovery with WarnerMedia, whose Turner Sports division produces The Match, GolfTV will serve as one of the international distributors of the franchise beginning in 2022.

In December 2018, Discovery and the European Tour reached a multi-year rights deal, under which GolfTV would acquire streaming rights to the Tour in various Asian, European, and Latin American markets, including exclusive rights in Italy, Romania, Russia, Spain and Turkey, and digital rights elsewhere. The rights also include the 2020 and 2022 Ryder Cup in selected markets. In Europe, the deal excludes Denmark, Finland, France, Ireland, Norway, Sweden, and the United Kingdom.

In November 2022, as part of a reorganization associated with the merger, it was announced that GolfTV would be shut down on December 12, 2022. Its content was to be dispersed to other Warner Bros. Discovery platforms, particularly Discovery+ and Max which replaced HBO Max on May 23, 2023 before it reverting into these name on July 9, 2025. Bell Media, which has partnered with WBD on Canadian versions of some of its other services, acquired the Canadian rights to PGA Tour Live coverage for inclusion in its new TSN+ sports streaming service.
