= Caves Valley Golf Club =

Non-profit golf club in Maryland, US

- Location in the United States Location in Maryland
- 39.451°N 76.744°W

Club information
- Location: Owings Mills, Maryland, U.S.
- Elevation: 600 feet (180 m)
- Established: 1991, 35 years ago
- Type: Private
- Total holes: 18
- Tournaments: 2017 Senior Players Championship; 2002 U.S. Senior Open; 2014 International Crown; BMW Championship
- Website: cavesvalley.net
- Designed by: Tom Fazio
- Par: 70
- Length: 7,631 yards (6,978 m)
- Course rating: 77.4
- Slope rating: 144

Caves Valley Golf Club is a member-owned, not-for-profit corporation in Owings Mills, Maryland—a suburb northwest of Baltimore. The Tom Fazio designed golf course opened 35 years ago in 1991, and is known for its fast greens, rolling fairways, and water hazards. The club and course span 962 acres of rolling hills, pastures, woods, and wetlands. The property features 18 holes of golf, a practice facility, clubhouse and 49 overnight rooms spread among the clubhouse and seven on-site golf cottages.

Caves Valley was rated as 47th among America's best modern courses by Golfweek magazine in 1997. Caves Valley achieved its highest Golf Digest ranking in 2015-2016 when it reached 132nd in the USA. The course has consistently ranked as one of the top courses in the State and is currently 3rd, according to Golf Digest.

== Championships hosted ==
In 2002, Caves Valley played host to the U.S. Senior Open where Don Pooley bested Tom Watson in a dramatic five hole playoff. In addition, the club has hosted the 1995 U.S. Mid-Amateur, the NCAA Division I Men's (2005) and Women's Golf Championships (2009), the AJGA Canon Cup in 1997 and 2004, and the Palmer Cup in 2007. It hosted the inaugural International Crown in 2014, a biennial team event organized by the LPGA Tour involving four-woman teams from eight countries. In 2017 it played host to the Constellation Senior Players Championship.

Caves Valley hosted The BMW Championship, part of the FedEx Cup playoffs on the PGA Tour, in 2021. Patrick Cantlay defeated Bryson DeChambeau on the sixth playoff hole. The event returned to the course in 2025, where Scottie Scheffler overcame a four-shot deficit to win over Robert MacIntyre.
