= Corales Puntacana Championship =

Golf tournament

Tournament information
- Location: Punta Cana, La Altagracia, Dominican Republic
- Established: 2016
- Course: Corales Golf Course
- Par: 72
- Length: 7,670 yards (7,010 m)
- Tours: PGA Tour (alternate event); European Tour; Web.com Tour (2016–2017)
- Format: Stroke play
- Prize fund: US$4,000,000
- Month played: July
- Website: Official website

Tournament record score
- Aggregate: 264 Dominic Bozzelli (2016)
- To par: −24 as above

Current champion
- (Italy) Stefano Mazzoli

Final champion
- Location in the Dominican Republic

The Corales Puntacana Championship is a golf tournament in the Dominican Republic on the PGA Tour, formerly on the Web.com Tour. It was first played in 2016 at Corales Golf Course in Puntacana Resort and Club, on the east coast in the La Altagracia province.

After two years as a Web.com Tour event, it transitioned to a PGA Tour alternate event (opposite the WGC Match Play in Texas), starting in March 2018. The first PGA Tour event held in the Dominican Republic, it is similar in rewards to other alternate events: 300 FedEx Cup points for the winner, a two-year tour exemption, 24 OWGR points, but no invitation to the Masters Tournament.

The inaugural event in 2016 was held in early June, then moved to early May in 2017.

Because of the COVID-19 pandemic, the 2020 tournament was postponed until September when it was part of the 2020–21 PGA Tour season. It was also elevated to full FedEx Cup point event status, with the winner receiving a 2021 Masters Tournament invitation.

The tournament was moved to an April date for the 2024 PGA Tour season, played as an "Additional" event in the same week as the RBC Heritage.

== Winners ==
Year	Tour(s) (Note: EUR − European Tour; PGAT − PGA Tour; WEB − Web.com Tour.)	Winner	Score	To par	Margin of victory	Runner(s)-up
Corales Puntacana Championship
2026	EUR, PGAT	(Italy) Stefano Mazzoli	268	−20	1 stroke	(England) Todd Clements (United States) Gordon Sargent
2025	PGAT	(South Africa) Garrick Higgo	274	−14	1 stroke	(United States) Joel Dahmen (United States) Keith Mitchell (Germany) Jeremy Paul (United States) Michael Thorbjornsen (Argentina) Alejandro Tosti
2024	PGAT	(United States) Billy Horschel	265	−23	2 strokes	(United States) Wesley Bryan
2023	PGAT	(England) Matt Wallace	269	−19	1 stroke	(Denmark) Nicolai Højgaard
2022	PGAT	(United States) Chad Ramey	271	−17	1 stroke	(United States) Ben Martin (United States) Alex Smalley
Corales Puntacana Resort and Club Championship
2021	PGAT	(United States) Joel Dahmen	276	−12	1 stroke	(Puerto Rico) Rafael Campos (United States) Sam Ryder
2020	PGAT	(United States) Hudson Swafford	270	−18	1 stroke	(United States) Tyler McCumber
2019	PGAT	(Northern Ireland) Graeme McDowell	270	−18	1 stroke	(Canada) Mackenzie Hughes (United States) Chris Stroud
2018	PGAT	(United States) Brice Garnett	270	−18	4 strokes	(United States) Keith Mitchell
2017	WEB	(United States) Nate Lashley (Note: Player graduated to the PGA Tour via the Web.com Tour regular-season money list.)	268	−20	1 stroke	(Argentina) Augusto Núñez
2016	WEB	(United States) Dominic Bozzelli	264	−24	4 strokes	(United States) Blake Adams (Mexico) Roberto Díaz (United States) Sam Ryder
