= Golf at the 2026 Central American and Caribbean Games =

- Venue: Corales Golf Course
- Location: Punta Cana, La Altagracia, Dominican Republic
- Dates: 25 – 28 July

The golf competition at the 2026 Central American and Caribbean Games was held in Punta Cana, La Altagracia, Dominican Republic, from 25 to 28 July 2026 at the Corales Golf Course.

== Participating nations ==
A total of 14 nations qualified athletes. The number of athletes a nation entered is in parentheses beside the name of the country.

- Bahamas (1)
- Barbados (1)
- Colombia (2)
- Costa Rica (2)
- Dominican Republic (3)
- El Salvador (1)
- Guatemala (2)
- Jamaica (2)
- Mexico (2)
- Panama (2)
- Puerto Rico (2)
- Saint Lucia (1)
- Trinidad and Tobago (1)
- Venezuela (2)

== Medal table ==
* Host nation (Dominican Republic)

Rank	Nation	Gold	Silver	Bronze	Total
1	Colombia (COL)	1	0	0	1
1	Guatemala (GUA)	1	0	0	1
3	Mexico (MEX)	0	1	0	1
3	Puerto Rico (PUR)	0	1	0	1
5	Dominican Republic (DOM)*	0	0	1	1
5	Venezuela (VEN)	0	0	1	1
Totals (6 entries)		2	2	2	6

== Medal summary ==
Event	Gold	Silver	Bronze
Men's individual	José Toledo; Guatemala	Luis Carrera; Mexico	Guillermo Pumarol; Dominican Republic
Women's individual	María Bohórquez; Colombia	Maria Torres; Puerto Rico	Vanessa Gilly; Venezuela
