= Congaree =

Congaree may refer to:

- Congaree people, a tribe of Native Americans who lived in South Carolina
- Congaree River, South Carolina, United States
- Congaree National Park, South Carolina
- Congaree (horse), American thoroughbred racehorse
- Congaree Golf Club, a private golf club in Ridgeland, SC

== See also ==
- South Congaree, South Carolina, a town
