= Medalist Golf Club =

Golf course in Hobe Sound, Florida

Coordinates: 27°4′58″N 80°8′58″W

- Interactive map of Medalist Golf Club

Club information
- Location: Hobe Sound, Florida
- Established: 1995
- Type: Private
- Total holes: 18

Medalist
- Designed by: Pete Dye & Greg Norman
- Par: 72
- Length: 7,571 yards
- Course rating: 77.9
- Slope rating: 155

Medalist Golf Club is an 18-hole golf course in Hobe Sound, Florida, founded by Tucker Frederickson, Greg Norman, and Robert Whitley.The course was originally designed by Pete Dye and Greg Norman with renovations to the course being made in 2015 by Bobby Weed and MacCurrach Golf Construction, Inc. Medalist is considered the home club to Norman and Tiger Woods. In 2013, Palm Beach Post reported that over 20 PGA Tour and LPGA Tour players were members at the club.

On May 24, 2020, Medalist hosted the teams of Woods & Peyton Manning and Phil Mickelson & Tom Brady in The Match: Champions for Charity, a scramble match-play competition during the COVID-19 pandemic. Despite never trailing, Manning/Woods won the match on the final hole after Brady/Mickelson made a comeback on the back nine. According to Turner Sports, the event attracted nearly six million viewers making it the most watched cable golfing event in history.
