= Old Overton Club =

Coordinates: 33°29′29.69″N 86°40′49.06″W

Old Overton Club, located in Vestavia Hills, Alabama, USA, is an invitation-only private golf club which opened in 1993. The course was designed by professional golfer Jerry Pate and Tom Fazio, with Pate supervising renovations in 2020. Golf Digest rated Old Overton as one of the Best New Private Courses in 1994. They listed the course as the third best in the state in 2005, and fifth in 2019.
