= Oscar de la Renta Tennis Center =

Tennis centre in Punta Cana, La Altagracia, Dominican Republic

- Interactive map of Oscar de la Renta Tennis Center
- Location: Santo Domingo Este, Santo Domingo Province, Dominican Republic
- Coordinates: 18.5287417°N 68.3712837°W
- Owner: Puntacana Resort and Club
- Operator: LUX Tennis
- Surface: clay, natural grass, hard (DecoTurf)

Construction
- Opened: 2015

Tenant
- Oscar de la Renta Social Tennis Tournament

The Oscar de la Renta Tennis Center is a complex of tennis courts located in Puntacana Resort and Club, Punta Cana, La Altagracia Province, Dominican Republic.

The complex opened in 2015 honoring fashion designer Oscar de la Renta and it is made up of 11 tennis courts: nine clay, and since 2018, one natural grass and one hard DecoTurf; a gym, four padel and two pickleball courts. The complex helds an annual charity tournament, the Oscar de la Renta Social Tennis Tournament were money is collected to help local ball boys and girls. In 2024, Puntacana Resort and Club partnered with LUX Tennis in order to boost the tennis players experience in the complex.
