= Augusta Municipal Golf Course =

Golf course in Augusta, Georgia, US

- Location within Georgia
- 33.464139°N 82.044434°W

Club information
- Location: 1928 Jim Dent Way; Augusta, Georgia, U.S.
- Established: December 20, 1928; 97 years ago
- Type: Public
- Owner: Patch Project LLC (Augusta Technical College, First Tee of Augusta, Masters Tournament Charities)
- Operator: Bobby Jones Links
- Total holes: 27 (The Patch: 18; The Loop: 9)
- Greens: TifEagle Bermuda grass
- Fairways: Tahoma 31 Bermuda grass
- Website: www.golfthepatch.com

Augusta Municipal Golf Course ("The Patch")
- Designed by: David Ogilvie (1928); Tom Fazio, Beau Welling (2026)
- Par: 72
- Length: 6,655 yards (6,085 m)
- Course rating: 71.8
- Slope rating: 132

The Loop at The Patch
- Designed by: Tiger Woods, TGR Design
- Par: 27
- Length: 780 yards (710 m)

Augusta Municipal Golf Course (also called The Patch) is a municipal golf course in Augusta, Georgia, abutting Daniel Field. The course was first opened in 1928.

In 2023, Augusta National Golf Club announced that it would renovate the Patch. The 18-hole, par-72, 6,655-yard (6,085 m) renovated course was designed by Tom Fazio with assistance from Beau Welling, and a new par-3, 780-yard (710 m) course called "The Loop" was designed by Tiger Woods and his firm TGR Design. The completed course re-opened to the public in 2026.

== History ==
The land where the course is located was part of the World War I-era Camp Hancock, and the area was abandoned by the army by 1919. As the popularity of golf increased in Augusta during the 1920s, the Augusta Chronicle wrote:

One of the greatest needs of the city, from a recreation and amusement standpoint, is a municipal golf course, placing golf within the reach of the home people and the winter visitor who is not able to pay the price of playing on the Country Club and Forrest Hills-Ricker links.

The city of Augusta leased the land to use for a golf course and an airport, Daniel Field. Augusta Municipal, the second course designed by Scottish golfer David Ogilvie (who was the head pro at Augusta Country Club), first opened on December 20, 1928 as a nine-hole course with sand greens; Ogilvie and three others played an exhibition game on opening day.

The next year, due to its immediate popularity, a back nine was added. During the Great Depression in the 1930s, the greens were converted to grass as part of a Works Progress Administration program, following a similar conversion at Pinehurst Resort's No. 2.

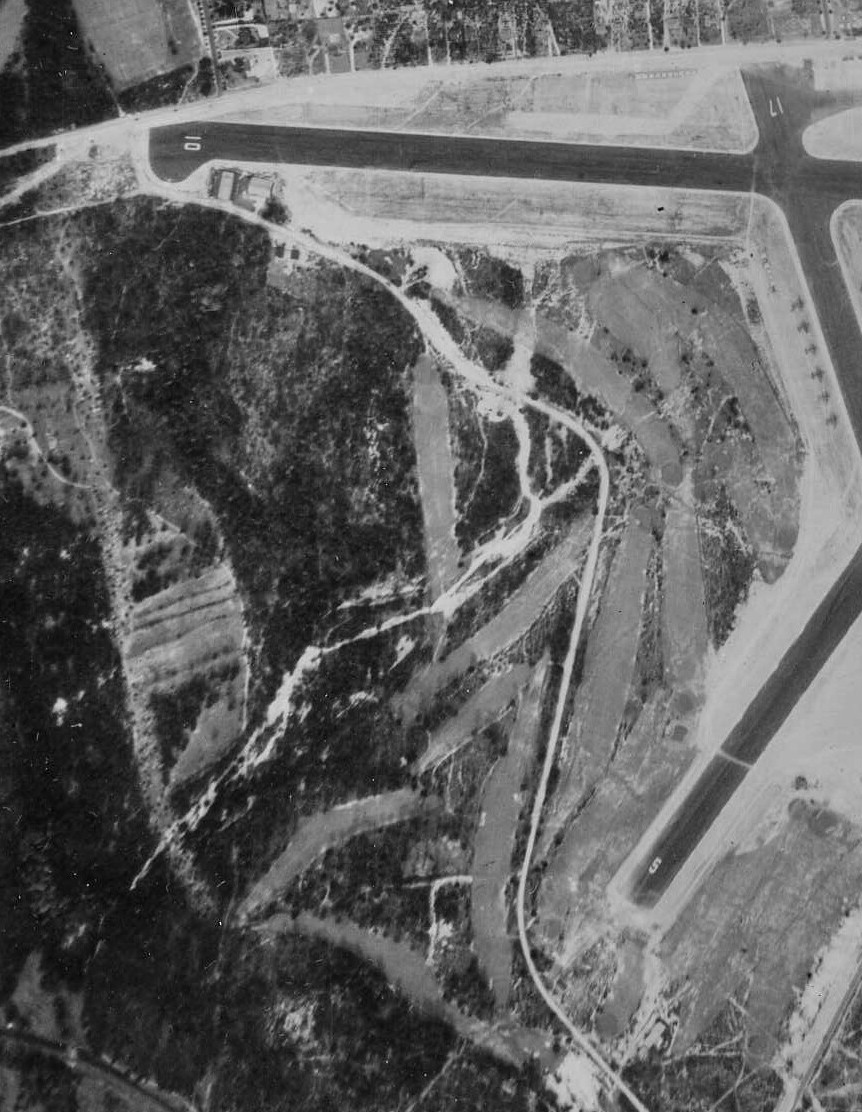
An aerial view of the course in 1941

As Daniel Field expanded during World War II, Augusta Municipal was severely neglected, necessitating a reworking of the course before its reopening in 1946. The course's head golf pro was Lawson "Red" Douglas, who leased the course from the city himself from 1952 to 1993. The Patch was desegregated in May 1964. The Patch's clubhouse was named Red Douglas Clubhouse after him.

Its nickname "The Patch" is of disputed origin, referring to either the patchiness of the grass or a cabbage patch that grew near hole 10.

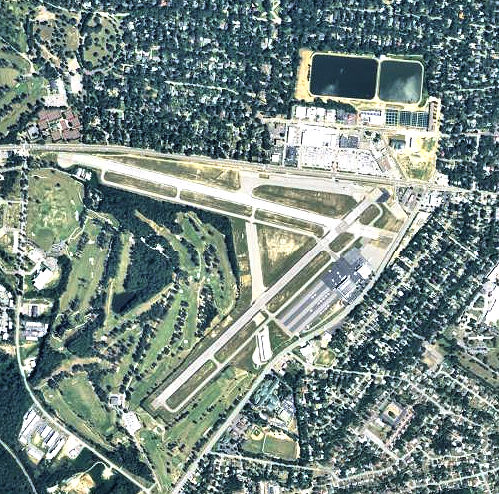
An aerial view of Daniel Field with the Patch visible at center-left, 2006

A Cessna 172 from neighboring Daniel Field crashed through the fence near hole 13 in 2007. Augusta State University considered acquiring the land for an expansion in 2010, but the plan never proceeded.

The Patch Golf Club, a holding company formed by Scotsman Brian Hendry, took over management of the course in 2012, leasing the property from the city for $1,000/month; the arrangement lasted for 8 months before the city repossessed the course and resumed its own operations, rejecting two other private offers. (City commissioners had rejected a $5,000/month offer from Affiniti Golf Partners.) First Tee also consistently offered to merge its own business with the Patch. Orlando-based Cypress Golf Management operated the Patch from 2013 through 2023.

The course's main road, then Walden Drive, was renamed to honor Jim Dent in 2020.

=== Augusta National renovation ===
In 2023, Augusta National Golf Club (ANGC) chairman Fred Ridley announced that ANGC, through its Masters Tournament Charities foundation and together with Augusta Technical College and First Tee of Augusta, would renovate The Patch; ANGC and the city agreed to a 50-year lease. The new 18-hole course was designed by Tom Fazio and Beau Welling. The clubhouse was moved from the south of the property to its highest point, near Wrightsboro Road.

A new, additional 9-hole par-3 course called The Loop at The Patch, designed by Tiger Woods, was revealed in 2025, after conversations between Ridley and Woods about the project "piqued Tiger's interest" and led to his involvement. There is also a 17-acre practice area and a putting course with 12 holes.

Construction was delayed by Hurricane Helene. The course re-opened in 2026 and is operated by Bobby Jones Links. Area locals receive reduced rates to play the course.

The Patch's new 18th green is a replica of Augusta National's famous hole 18 (Holly). The putting greens are TifEagle Bermuda grass and the fairways and rough are Tahoma 31 Bermuda grass, with Centipedegrass surrounding the fairways. The new course features fewer trees than the old Patch. A beer called the Patch Pale Ale is available only at the course.

== Course ==
The renovated Patch has a par of 72 across 18 holes, and features five sets of tees. It is a total of 6,655 yards (6,085 m) long.

Augusta Municipal ("The Patch", 2026 renovation)
Tee	Rating/Slope	1	2	3	4	5	6	7	8	9	Out	10	11	12	13	14	15	16	17	18	In	Total
Par		4	4	4	3	4	5	3	5	3	35	4	4	4	5	3	4	5	4	4	37	72
SI	Men's	12	14	2	18	10	6	8	4	16		3	9	11	1	17	15	5	13	7
SI	Women's	8	10	4	18	12	2	16	6	14		7	3	9	1	17	15	5	11	13
Black	71.8/132	335	315	490	140	365	525	205	540	210	3,125	435	445	365	540	190	330	490	365	370	3,530	6,655
White	69.6/127	315	295	440	125	345	500	175	520	170	2,885	395	420	345	510	175	305	455	350	345	3,300	6,185
Green	68.4/123	300	270	415	120	320	470	170	495	145	2,705	365	375	310	480	150	300	430	330	325	3,065	5,770
Gray	M:65.5/118 W:69.8/120	280	250	380	110	285	420	140	450	125	2,440	345	340	290	430	125	260	410	300	240	2,805	5,245
Gold	M:62.3/110 W:65.8/111	275	220	315	85	240	335	110	390	95	2,065	285	305	260	370	110	235	335	240	170	2,310	4,375

The Loop at The Patch is a nine-hole, par-3 course with artificial turf measuring a total of 780 yards (710 m).

The Loop at The Patch
Tee	Rating/Slope	1	2	3	4	5	6	7	8	9	Total
Par		3	3	3	3	3	3	3	3	3	27
SI		6	1	9	5	2	7	8	4	3
Green		65	105	55	100	115	70	80	80	110	780

== See also ==
- Augusta Country Club
- Augusta National Golf Club
