= Sand Ridge Golf Club =

Coordinates: 41°32′8″N 81°12′14″W

Club information
- Location: Munson Township, Geauga County, Ohio (United States)
- Established: 1998
- Type: Private
- Total holes: 18
- Website: www.mayfieldsandridge.com
- Designed by: Tom Fazio
- Par: 72
- Length: 7,207
- Course rating: 75.3
- Course record: 63 (Jason Kokrak, Owen Stamper)

Sand Ridge Golf Club, was designed by Tom Fazio and is located in Munson Township, Geauga County, Ohio, near Chardon. Construction on the course started in late 1995 and opened for its private members on May 18, 1998. The course was built on 370 acres (1.5 km^{2}) of woods, pastures and wetlands located next to the Fairmount Minerals sandstone quarry in Chardon. It also contains the headwaters of both the Chagrin and Cuyahoga rivers.

Sand Ridge is recognized as a top-caliber golf course and ranked as high as 52nd best course in the U.S for 2005-2006 by Golf Digest. Sand Ridge was the first course in Ohio, and one of a select few in the world, to be designated as a Certified Audubon International Signature Wildlife Sanctuary.

Sand Ridge merged with The Mayfield Country Club in 2006, and is now half of The Mayfield Sand Ridge Club. Having two courses available to the members has made the combination especially desirable in the Eastern Cleveland Private Club market. in 2018, the club was purchased by local business executive, Monte Ahuja, who also owns Barrington Golf Club

== Events ==
The course has hosted numerous events including:

- 1999 U.S. Open Regional Qualifier
- 2000 USGA Senior Amateur Qualifier
- 2001 U.S. Women's Mid-Amateur Qualifier
- 2005 Cleveland State Invitational Medalist Gary Woodland 67-66-69
- 2006 NCAA Regional qualifier
  - Won by eventual national champion Oklahoma State

Notable Competitors

- Anthony Kim 214 - T4
- Cameron Tringale 214 - T4
- Colt Knost 218 - T20
- Jason Kokrak 221 - T37
- Gary Woodland 227 - T75
- Jhonnattan Vegas 228 - T86

- 2015 NCAA MAC Championship
- 2022 - 2024 Korn Ferry Tour Qualifying School

== Course Information ==
- 110 bunkers
- 7 water hazards
- 18 holes
- 55 tees driving range
- Greens Grass: Bent Grass
- Fairways Grass: Bent Grass
- Par 72 (36-36)
- Rules of USGA Govern all play

| Tees | Yards | Slope Rating | Course Rating |
| DD | 7275 | 141 | 75.8 |
| D | 6698 | 137 | 73.1 |
| S | 5888 | 126 | 69.0 |
| C | 5100 | 117 | 69.2 |

Notes:

- DD denotes Double Diamond (Championship Tees)
- D denotes Diamond Tees (Men's Tees)
- S denotes Square Tees (Senior Tees)
- C denotes Circles Tees (Women's Tees)
- The slope rating of a golf course, typically in the US, is a measure of its difficulty for bogey golfers.
- The course rating is the sum of the total pars of the played holes.

== Course ==
Hole #1: Overture

Par 4, Handicap 15

- Championship Tee: 383
- Members Tee: 363
- Seniors Tee: 290
- Ladies Tee: 252
- The opening hole is a short par 4 with a right dog leg. The most important shot on this hole is the first.

Hole #2: Plateau

Par 4, Handicap 7

- Championship Tee: 421
- Members Tee: 383
- Seniors Tee: 351
- Ladies Tee: 310
- A patch of wetlands to the right of the tee is a harbinger. This hole has a generous landing zone for the drive, but the second shot is challenged by a two-tiered elevated green.

Hole #3: Craters

Par 5, Handicap 1

- Championship Tee: 575
- Members Tee: 545
- Seniors Tee: 511
- Ladies Tee: 402
- The course's #1 handicap hole is a long, uphill par 5, protected by 24 bunkers. Only two small bunkers are visible from the tee-box, all are visible from the second and third shot, and NONE are seen from the green when looking back at the tee-box.

Hole #4: Vista

Par 3, Handicap 13

- Championship Tee: 223
- Members Tee: 186
- Seniors Tee: 157
- Ladies Tee: 121
- A long par 3 at 223 yards (204 m) from the tip. Requires a carry over tall fescue and bunkers onto a narrow green. This one plays long.

Hole #5: Twin

Par 4, Handicap 3

- Championship Tee: 438
- Members Tee: 407
- Seniors Tee: 376
- Ladies Tee: 333
- With two separate greens, this hole features a fascinating strategy contrast. When the pin is on the left green, a monster bunker protects the hole and the player will need to fight through dense rough. The right green is open, but has a long right dog leg.

Hole #6: Ledge

Par 5, Handicap 11

- Championship Tee: 527
- Members Tee: 485
- Seniors Tee: 450
- Ladies Tee: 407
- This is a medium Par 5, requiring a drive between flanking bunkers. The player has to account for a prevailing headwind on the difficult third shot to a plateau green.

Hole #7: Draw

Par 4, Handicap 5

- Championship Tee: 444
- Members Tee: 419
- Seniors Tee: 386
- Ladies Tee: 339
- A downhill Par 4 that will reward a sweeping draw from the tee.

Hole #8: Orphan

Par 3, Handicap 17

- Championship Tee: 168
- Members Tee: 142
- Seniors Tee: 122
- Ladies Tee: 103
- The hole of this picturesque par 3 is protected by a front-facing pond and wetlands behind. A steep face bunker is located in front of the green.

Hole #9: Snake

Par 4, Handicap 9

- Championship Tee: 406
- Members Tee: 374
- Seniors Tee: 343
- Ladies Tee: 300
- This hole has a generous landing zone for a tee shot. The green is defended by a pond to the left and multiple traps to the right, making for a daunting second shot.

Hole #10: Pulpit

Par 4, Handicap 10

- Championship Tee: 401
- Members Tee: 370
- Seniors Tee: 340
- Ladies Tee: 294
- Blind, uphill tee shot. The second shot requires a long carry over water to a narrow green.

Hole #11: Redan

Par 4, Handicap 4

- Championship Tee: 483
- Members Tee: 433
- Seniors Tee: 376
- Ladies Tee: 301
- A fade is favored from the tee. However, too much is punished by trees.

Hole #12: Rockside

Par 3, Handicap 18

- Championship Tee: 177
- Members Tee: 150
- Seniors Tee: 121
- Ladies Tee: 110
- The green is heavily tiered. Involves high punishment for errant tee shots and high reward for accuracy.

Hole #13: Falls

Par 4, Handicap 2

- Championship Tee: 466
- Members Tee: 444
- Seniors Tee: 424
- Ladies Tee: 325
- One of many visually impressive holes on the course. A waterfall adjacent to the tee sets the stage for the long par 4. Length and accuracy are required from the tee and into the well-protected green. Par is an excellent score.

Hole #14: Dilemma

Par 5, Handicap 8

- Championship Tee: 540
- Members Tee: 511
- Seniors Tee: 480
- Ladies Tee: 441
- The dilemma is to attempt to carry the wasteland on the second shot or lay-up to the right on this par 5. This is a high risk, high reward Fazio classic with eagle possibilities.

Hole #15: Quarry

Par 4, Handicap 16

- Championship Tee: 341
- Members Tee: 311
- Seniors Tee: 291
- Ladies Tee: 257
- A short par 4. It looks innocent, but the green requires an adroit player, as it is the toughest on the course.

Hole #16: Cape

Par 4, Handicap 6

- Championship Tee: 404
- Members Tee: 385
- Seniors Tee: 343
- Ladies Tee: 286
- A dramatic cape hole. Fraught with hazards; the second shot will require pinpoint accuracy.

Hole #17: Headwaters

Par 3, Handicap 14

- Championship Tee: 230
- Members Tee: 200
- Seniors Tee: 180
- Ladies Tee: 80
- A beautiful, wetlands-traversing hole that requires a 200-yard (180 m) carry.

Hole #18: Split

Par 5, Handicap 12

- Championship Tee: 555
- Members Tee: 531
- Seniors Tee: 490
- Ladies Tee: 445
- Majestic finishing hole with cross bunkers that split the fairway. Choose from two fairways for your approach, depending on the pin placement. The wetlands frame a generous green, while hawks that often circle the green and surrounding wetlands add a touch of nature to the experience.
