= Camp Hancock (Georgia) =

Coordinates: 33.467°N 82.038°W

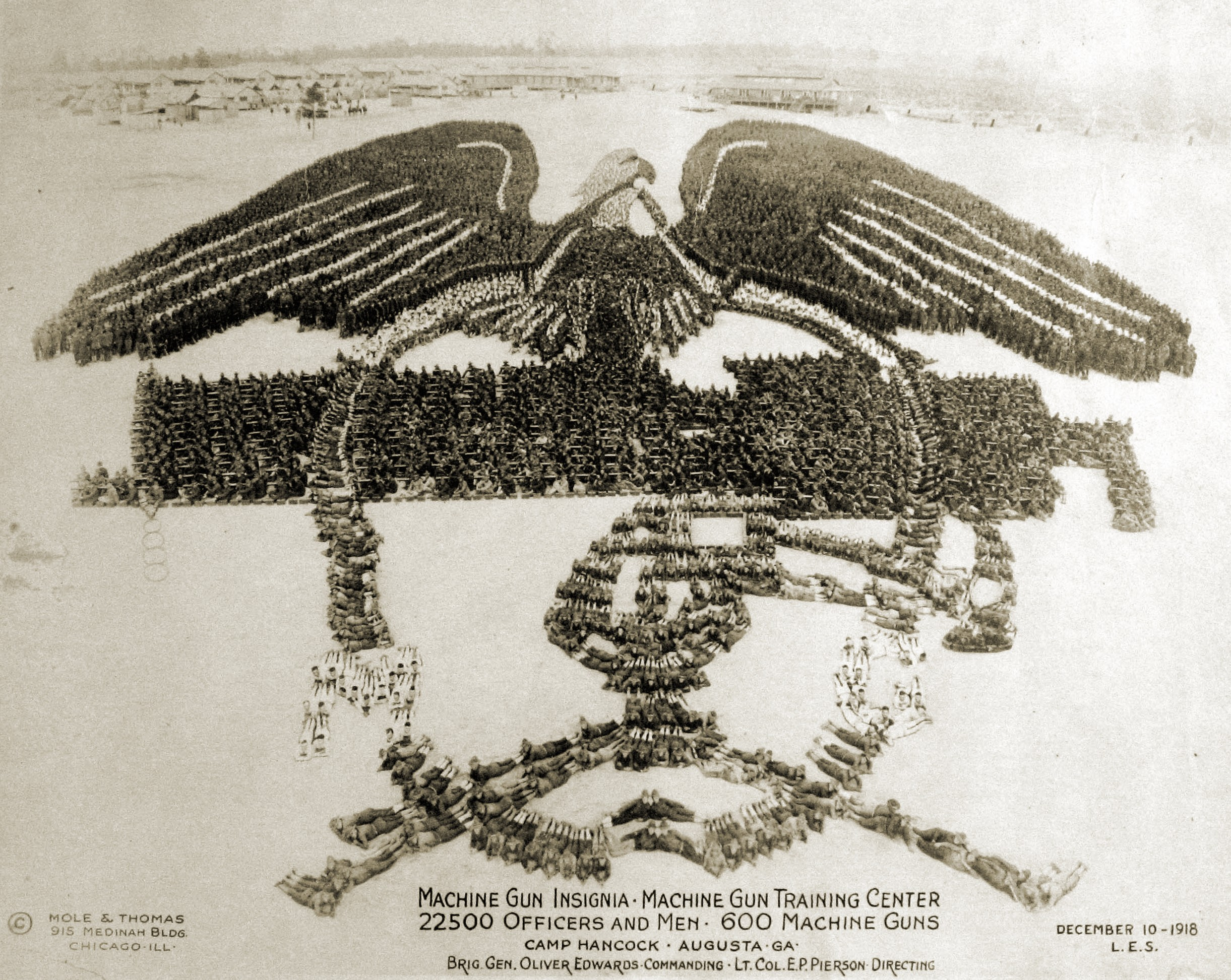
Machine Gun Insignia. 22,500 Officers & Men; 600 Machine Guns; Machine Gun Training Centre; Camp Hancock, Augusta, Georgia, 1918

Camp Hancock near Augusta, Georgia was a military cantonment that was opened during World War I. It was named after Winfield Scott Hancock.

It included an airfield and it served as a base for a reserves unit.

It was also a divisional camp for the United States Army National Guard and a special camp for training of Army machinegun troops.

Edward Leonard King was a chief of staff there.

The area is now occupied by Augusta Municipal Golf Course and Daniel Field.
