= CJ Cup =

Golf tournament (2017–2022)

Coordinates: 36.2577°N 115.1059°W

Tournament information
- Location: Gillisonville, South Carolina
- Established: 2017
- Course: Congaree Golf Club
- Par: 71
- Length: 7,685 yards (7,027 m)
- Tour: PGA Tour
- Format: Stroke play
- Prize fund: US$10,500,000
- Month played: October
- Final year: 2022

Tournament record score
- Aggregate: 263 Rory McIlroy (2021)
- To par: −25 as above

Final champion
- (Northern Ireland) Rory McIlroy

Location map
- Location in the United States Location in South Carolina

The CJ Cup was a professional golf tournament on the PGA Tour. The tournament was played for the first time in October 2017 at the start of the 2017–18 season, and was sponsored by CJ Group. The first three editions were played at the Nine Bridges Golf Club on Jeju Island, South Korea. In 2020, the tournament was moved to Shadow Creek Golf Course in North Las Vegas, Nevada as part of a Las Vegas Swing in October due to COVID-19 pandemic travel restrictions. In 2021, plans to return to South Korea were abandoned with the tournament remaining in the Las Vegas area, but moving to The Summit Club in Summerlin. For 2022, the event was held at Congaree Golf Club in Gillisonville, South Carolina, near Hilton Head Island.

In 2024, the CJ Group became title sponsor of The Byron Nelson under a ten-year sponsorship, transferring the CJ Cup title to it as the "CJ Cup Byron Nelson".

== Field ==
The CJ Cup featured a field of 78 players:

- Top 60 available players from the previous season's final FedEx Cup standings
- Winners of the KPGA Championship and Genesis Championship on the Korean Tour
- Top 3 available players from the Korean Tour order of merit
- Top available player from the Asian Tour order of merit
- Top available Korean player from the Asian Tour order of merit
- Top next 3 available Korean players from the Official World Golf Ranking
- 8 sponsor exemptions:

- 5 restricted to PGA Tour members
- 1 to the winner of a Korean amateur qualifier
- 2 unrestricted

== Winners ==
Year	Winner	Score	To par	Margin of victory	Runner-up	Venue
2022	(Northern Ireland) Rory McIlroy (2)	267	−17	1 stroke	(United States) Kurt Kitayama	Congaree, Gillisonville (Savannah)
2021	(Northern Ireland) Rory McIlroy	263	−25	1 stroke	(United States) Collin Morikawa	The Summit Club, Las Vegas
2020	(United States) Jason Kokrak	268	−20	2 strokes	(United States) Xander Schauffele	Shadow Creek, Las Vegas
2019	(United States) Justin Thomas (2)	268	−20	2 strokes	(New Zealand) Danny Lee	Nine Bridges, Jeju Island
2018	(United States) Brooks Koepka	267	−21	4 strokes	(United States) Gary Woodland	Nine Bridges, Jeju Island
2017	(United States) Justin Thomas	279	−9	Playoff	(Australia) Marc Leishman	Nine Bridges, Jeju Island
