= 2021 FedEx Cup Playoffs =

Tournament information
- Dates: August 19 – September 5, 2021
- Location: Liberty National Golf Club; Caves Valley Golf Club; East Lake Golf Club
- Tour: PGA Tour

Statistics
- Field: 125 for The Northern Trust; 70 for BMW Championship; 30 for Tour Championship
- Prize fund: $60 million (bonus money)
- Winner's share: $15 million (bonus money)

Champion
- (United States) Patrick Cantlay
- −21

The 2021 FedEx Cup Playoffs, the series of three golf tournaments that determined the season champion on the U.S.-based PGA Tour, was played from August 19 – September 5. It included the following three events:

- The Northern Trust – Liberty National Golf Club, Jersey City, New Jersey
- BMW Championship – Caves Valley Golf Club, Owings Mills, Maryland
- Tour Championship – East Lake Golf Club, Atlanta, Georgia

This was the 15th FedEx Cup playoffs since their inception in 2007.

The point distributions can be seen here.

== Regular season rankings ==
The leading 10 players in the FedEx Cup regular season standings qualified for a share of the $10 million Comcast Business Tour top 10 bonus.

Place	Player	Points	Events	Bonus ($)
1	(United States) Collin Morikawa	2,171	20	2,000,000
2	(United States) Jordan Spieth	2,139	22	1,500,000
3	(United States) Patrick Cantlay	2,056	21	1,200,000
4	(United States) Harris English	2,039	23	1,100,000
5	(Spain) Jon Rahm	2,003	19	1,000,000
6	(Mexico) Abraham Ancer	1,926	24	850,000
7	(United States) Bryson DeChambeau	1,910	19	700,000
8	(South Africa) Louis Oosthuizen	1,877	19	600,000
9	(United States) Justin Thomas	1,758	20	550,000
10	(United States) Sam Burns	1,721	23	500,000

== The Northern Trust ==
The Northern Trust was scheduled for August 19–22. The leading 125 players in the FedEx Cup regular season standings are eligible to play in the event. Louis Oosthuizen (ranked 8) and Patrick Reed (22) did not play, reducing the field to 123. 75 players made the second-round cut at 141 (−1). The final round was delayed until Monday August 23 because of Hurricane Henri.

Tony Finau won the event, beating Cameron Smith in a playoff. The top 70 players in the points standings advanced to the BMW Championship. This included six players who were outside the top 70 prior to The Northern Trust: Alex Norén (ranked 91st to 47th), Erik van Rooyen (76 to 45), Tom Hoge (108 to 48), Harold Varner III (72 to 56), Keith Mitchell (101 to 63), and Harry Higgs (80 to 69). Six players started the tournament within the top 70 but ended the tournament outside the top 70, ending their playoff chances: Matthew Wolff (ranked 59th to 71st), Matt Fitzpatrick (60 to 73), Tyrrell Hatton (63 to 74), Martin Laird (65 to 75), Troy Merritt (69 to 78), and J. T. Poston (70 to 79).

					FedEx Cup rank	
Place	Player	Score	To par	Winnings ($)	After	Before
1	(United States) Tony Finau	67-64-68-65=264	−20	1,710,000	1	23
2	(Australia) Cameron Smith	69-68-60-67=264	−20	1,035,500	3	16
3	(Spain) Jon Rahm	63-67-67-69=266	−18	655,500	2	5
T4	(United States) Tom Hoge	69-64-67-69=269	−15	399,792	48	108
T4	(Sweden) Alex Norén	69-64-70-66=269	−15	399,792	43	91
T4	(United States) Justin Thomas	63-69-67-70=269	−15	399,792	5	9
7	(South Africa) Erik van Rooyen	69-67-62-72=270	−14	320,625	45	76
T8	(Canada) Corey Conners	70-69-62-70=271	−13	277,875	20	28
T8	(United States) Keith Mitchell	68-64-70-69=271	−13	277,875	63	101
T8	(United States) Kevin Na	67-66-70-68=271	−13	277,875	18	24

- Par 71 course

== BMW Championship ==
The BMW Championship was played August 26–29. 70 players were eligible to play in the event. There was no second-round cut. Patrick Reed withdrew, reducing the field to 69.

Patrick Cantlay won the event, beating Bryson DeChambeau in a playoff. The top 30 players in the points standings advanced to the Tour Championship. This included two players who were outside the top 30 prior to the BMW Championship: Erik van Rooyen (ranked 45th to 27th) and Sergio García (44 to 28). Two players started the tournament within the top 30 but ended the tournament outside the top 30, ending their playoff chances: Charley Hoffman (29 to 32) and Max Homa (30 to 35).

					FedEx Cup rank	
Place	Player	Score	To par	Winnings ($)	After	Before
1	(United States) Patrick Cantlay	66-63-66-66=261	−27	1,710,000	1	4
2	(United States) Bryson DeChambeau	68-60-67-66=261	−27	1,026,000	3	9
3	(South Korea) Im Sung-jae	67-65-66-67=265	−23	646,000	12	25
4	(Northern Ireland) Rory McIlroy	64-70-65-67=266	−22	456,000	16	28
5	(South Africa) Erik van Rooyen	67-68-67-65=267	−21	380,000	27	45
T6	(Spain) Sergio García	65-67-67-69=268	−20	330,125	28	44
T6	(United States) Dustin Johnson	67-70-65-66=268	−20	330,125	15	22
8	(United States) Sam Burns	64-70-65-70=269	−19	294,500	10	12
T9	(Mexico) Abraham Ancer	65-67-67-69=270	−18	256,500	8	10
T9	(Sweden) Alex Norén	71-66-67-66=270	−18	256,500	33	43
T9	(Spain) Jon Rahm	64-66-70-70=270	−18	256,500	4	2

- Par 72 course

== Tour Championship ==
The Tour Championship was played September 2–5 and was contested by the leading 30 players in the FedEx Cup points standings after the BMW Championship, with no second-round cut. Players were allocated a starting score relative to par based on their position in the standings after the BMW Championship. The points leader started the tournament at 10 under par, number two at 8 under par, number three at 7 under par, number four at 6 under par and number five at 5 under par. Players ranked 6 to 10 started at 4 under par, 11 to 15 at 3 under par, 16 to 20 at 2 under par, 21 to 25 at 1 under par and 26 to 30 started at even par. The winner of the Tour Championship won the FedEx Cup. For the purposes of the Official World Golf Ranking, points were awarded based on aggregate scores (total strokes taken, ignoring any starting scores).

Patrick Cantlay won by a stroke from Jon Rahm. Rahm and Kevin Na had the best 72-hole aggregate scores of 266, three better than Cantlay.

Place	Player	Round scores	Starting score	Final score	FedEx Cup rank		Winnings ($)
Place	Player	Round scores	Starting score	Final score	After	Before	Winnings ($)
1	(United States) Patrick Cantlay	67-66-67-69=269	−10	−21	1	1	15,000,000
2	(Spain) Jon Rahm	65-65-68-68=266	−6	−20	2	4	5,000,000
3	(United States) Kevin Na	66-67-66-67=266	−2	−16	3	19	4,000,000
4	(United States) Justin Thomas	67-67-65-70=269	−4	−15	4	6	3,000,000
T5	(Norway) Viktor Hovland	66-68-70-65=269	−3	−14	T5	13	2,200,000
T5	(United States) Xander Schauffele	68-69-67-64=268	−2	−14	T5	17	2,200,000
7	(United States) Bryson DeChambeau	69-67-72-66=274	−7	−13	7	3	1,300,000
8	(United States) Dustin Johnson	68-69-68-67=272	−3	−11	8	15	1,100,000
T9	(Mexico) Abraham Ancer	69-70-65-70=274	−4	−10	T9	8	890,000
T9	(United States) Billy Horschel	65-68-67-70=270	E	−10	T9	29	890,000

- Par 70 course

For the full list see here.

== Table of qualified players ==
Table key:

Win
Top-10 finish
Did not advance to next tournament
Played way into next tournament

	Player	Pre-Playoffs		The Northern Trust		BMW Championship		Tour Championship		
	Player	Points	Rank	Finish	Rank after	Finish	Rank after	Starting score	Final score	Final rank
(United States)	Collin Morikawa	2,171	1	CUT	6	T63	11	−3	E	T26
(United States)	Jordan Spieth	2,139	2	73	7	T34	9	−4	−4	T20
(United States)	Patrick Cantlay	2,056	3	T11	4	1	1	−10	−21	1
(United States)	Harris English	2,039	4	T31	8	T26	7	−4	−6	T18
(Spain)	Jon Rahm	2,003	5	3	2	T9	4	−6	−20	2
(Mexico)	Abraham Ancer	1,926	6	T64	10	T9	8	−4	−10	T9
(United States)	Bryson DeChambeau	1,910	7	T31	9	2	3	−7	−13	7
(South Africa)	Louis Oosthuizen	1,877	8	DNP	11	T38	14	−3	−7	T14
(United States)	Justin Thomas	1,758	9	T4	5	T22	6	−4	−15	4
(United States)	Sam Burns	1,721	10	T21	12	8	10	−4	−6	T18
(Norway)	Viktor Hovland	1,717	11	T43	14	T17	13	−3	−14	T5
(United States)	Jason Kokrak	1,631	12	CUT	17	T15	18	−2	−8	T11
(United States)	Xander Schauffele	1,623	13	T16	13	T49	17	−2	−14	T5
(Japan)	Hideki Matsuyama	1,594	14	T43	16	T46	22	−1	E	T26
(United States)	Brooks Koepka	1,562	15	T31	15	T22	20	−2	WD	30
(Australia)	Cameron Smith	1,539	16	2	3	T34	5	−5	−7	T14
(United States)	Dustin Johnson	1,510	17	CUT	22	T6	15	−3	−11	8
(Chile)	Joaquín Niemann	1,491	18	T47	21	T29	24	−1	+4	29
(United States)	Stewart Cink	1,445	19	T21	19	T38	23	−1	E	T26
(United States)	Daniel Berger	1,444	20	T56	23	T26	26	E	−8	T11
(United States)	Scottie Scheffler	1,409	21	T43	24	T22	25	−1	−3	T22
(United States)	Patrick Reed	1,381	22	DNP	26	DNP	30	E	−2	25
(United States)	Tony Finau	1,348	23	1	1	T15	2	−8	−8	T11
(United States)	Kevin Na	1,308	24	T8	18	T17	19	−2	−16	3
(United States)	Billy Horschel	1,292	25	T31	27	T52	29	E	−10	T9
(Northern Ireland)	Rory McIlroy	1,291	26	T43	28	4	16	−2	−7	T14
(United States)	Max Homa	1,220	27	T47	30	T63	35	–	–	35
(Canada)	Corey Conners	1,212	28	T8	20	T22	21	−1	−3	T22
(United States)	Kevin Kisner	1,200	29	CUT	31	T66	38	–	–	38
(South Korea)	Kim Si-woo	1,187	30	CUT	33	T29	34	–	–	34
(South Korea)	Im Sung-jae	1,185	31	T16	25	3	12	−3	−4	T20
(United States)	Charley Hoffman	1,127	32	T21	29	T38	32	–	–	32
(Australia)	Marc Leishman	1,103	33	T47	35	51	42	–	–	42
(South Korea)	Lee Kyoung-hoon	1,064	34	T47	37	T12	31	–	–	31
(United States)	Brian Harman	1,052	35	75	39	T29	41	–	–	41
(Australia)	Cameron Davis	1,052	36	T31	36	T29	37	–	–	37
(Mexico)	Carlos Ortiz	1,044	37	T47	38	T66	48	–	–	48
(United States)	Lucas Glover	1,044	38	CUT	41	T38	46	–	–	46
(Australia)	Matt Jones	1,033	39	CUT	42	T38	47	–	–	47
(Spain)	Sergio García	1,020	40	CUT	44	T6	28	E	−7	T14
(United States)	Cameron Tringale	986	41	T21	34	T52	43	–	–	43
(South Africa)	Branden Grace	955	42	CUT	51	T52	55	–	–	55
(United States)	Keegan Bradley	941	43	T11	32	T60	39	–	–	39
(United States)	Russell Henley	939	44	T56	50	T60	56	–	–	56
(England)	Paul Casey	932	45	T64	54	T38	52	–	–	52
(United States)	Webb Simpson	920	46	T47	52	T12	40	–	–	40
(Argentina)	Emiliano Grillo	920	47	CUT	55	T46	59	–	–	59
(England)	Lee Westwood	867	48	T27	46	T34	50	–	–	50
(Venezuela)	Jhonattan Vegas	866	49	CUT	61	T38	61	–	–	61
(South Africa)	Charl Schwartzel	857	50	CUT	62	T17	51	–	–	51
(United States)	Chris Kirk	853	51	T56	60	48	62	–	–	62
(United States)	Cameron Champ	839	52	T27	49	T66	57	–	–	57
(United States)	Kevin Streelman	837	53	T64	64	T52	64	–	–	64
(United States)	Maverick McNealy	830	54	T27	53	T63	58	–	–	58
(United States)	Ryan Palmer	812	55	CUT	68	T57	69	–	–	69
(United States)	Hudson Swafford	804	56	T11	40	T17	36	–	–	36
(United States)	Patton Kizzire	802	57	T56	66	T34	63	–	–	63
(United States)	Phil Mickelson	791	58	CUT	70	T66	70	–	–	70
(United States)	Matthew Wolff	772	59	CUT	71	–	–	–	–	71
(England)	Matt Fitzpatrick	748	60	CUT	73	–	–	–	–	73
(United States)	Aaron Wise	741	61	T21	58	T17	49	–	–	49
(Colombia)	Sebastián Muñoz	740	62	T21	59	T29	53	–	–	53
(England)	Tyrrell Hatton	739	63	CUT	74	–	–	–	–	74
(United States)	Talor Gooch	739	64	T31	67	T57	68	–	–	68
(Scotland)	Martin Laird	734	65	CUT	75	–	–	–	–	75
(Republic of Ireland)	Shane Lowry	727	66	T11	47	T26	45	–	–	45
(Canada)	Mackenzie Hughes	719	67	T27	65	T52	67	–	–	67
(United States)	Robert Streb	710	68	T16	57	T60	60	–	–	60
(United States)	Troy Merritt	700	69	CUT	78	–	–	–	–	78
(United States)	J. T. Poston	697	70	CUT	79	–	–	–	–	79
(United States)	Bubba Watson	685	71	CUT	81	–	–	–	–	81
(United States)	Harold Varner III	674	72	T11	56	T12	44	–	–	44
(Republic of Ireland)	Séamus Power	670	73	T31	72	–	–	–	–	72
(United States)	Brandon Hagy	660	74	CUT	84	–	–	–	–	84
(United States)	Andrew Putnam	648	75	T56	82	–	–	–	–	82
(South Africa)	Erik van Rooyen*	648	76	7	45	5	27	E	−3	T22
(United States)	Joel Dahmen	646	77	T31	76	–	–	–	–	76
(United States)	Adam Long	636	78	CUT	85	–	–	–	–	85
(England)	Ian Poulter	628	79	T31	77	–	–	–	–	77
(United States)	Harry Higgs	614	80	T16	69	T38	66	–	–	66
(United States)	Wyndham Clark	609	81	CUT	87	–	–	–	–	87
(Australia)	Adam Scott	604	82	CUT	90	–	–	–	–	90
(United States)	Peter Malnati	602	83	T47	86	–	–	–	–	86
(United States)	Lanto Griffin	593	84	T64	89	–	–	–	–	89
(United States)	Brian Stuard	592	85	CUT	92	–	–	–	–	92
(United States)	Doug Ghim*	587	86	T31	83	–	–	–	–	83
(Sweden)	Henrik Norlander	586	87	CUT	93	–	–	–	–	93
(United States)	Doc Redman	580	88	CUT	94	–	–	–	–	94
(United States)	Brian Gay	579	89	CUT	95	–	–	–	–	95
(United States)	Kramer Hickok*	574	90	T56	91	–	–	–	–	91
(Sweden)	Alex Norén	567	91	T4	43	T9	33	–	–	33
(Canada)	Roger Sloan	565	92	CUT	96	–	–	–	–	96
(United States)	Hank Lebioda*	564	93	CUT	98	–	–	–	–	98
(United States)	Tyler McCumber*	551	94	CUT	99	–	–	–	–	99
(United States)	Brendon Todd	544	95	CUT	101	–	–	–	–	101
(Canada)	Adam Hadwin	540	96	CUT	103	–	–	–	–	103
(United States)	Denny McCarthy	538	97	T71	100	–	–	–	–	100
(United States)	Brendan Steele	536	98	CUT	105	–	–	–	–	105
(Austria)	Sepp Straka	533	99	CUT	106	–	–	–	–	106
(United States)	Brandt Snedeker	533	100	T47	97	–	–	–	–	97
(United States)	Keith Mitchell	532	101	T8	63	T57	65	–	–	65
(United States)	Luke List	531	102	70	102	–	–	–	–	102
(United States)	Adam Schenk	530	103	T31	88	–	–	–	–	88
(South Africa)	Garrick Higgo*	515	104	T64	107	–	–	–	–	107
(United States)	James Hahn	508	105	T71	108	–	–	–	–	108
(Scotland)	Russell Knox	507	106	CUT	110	–	–	–	–	110
(England)	Matt Wallace*	502	107	WD	111	–	–	–	–	111
(United States)	Tom Hoge	502	108	T4	48	T49	54	–	–	54
(United States)	Sam Ryder	499	109	CUT	112	–	–	–	–	112
(Australia)	Jason Day	489	110	CUT	114	–	–	–	–	114
(United States)	Pat Perez	489	111	T16	80	–	–	–	–	80
(United States)	Matthew NeSmith	485	112	CUT	115	–	–	–	–	115
(United States)	Zach Johnson	485	113	T47	109	–	–	–	–	109
(United States)	Gary Woodland	484	114	74	113	–	–	–	–	113
(United States)	Kyle Stanley	477	115	CUT	117	–	–	–	–	117
(United States)	Scott Piercy	470	116	T64	116	–	–	–	–	116
(United States)	Richy Werenski	467	117	CUT	120	–	–	–	–	120
(Taiwan)	Pan Cheng-tsung	466	118	CUT	121	–	–	–	–	121
(United States)	Chez Reavie	457	119	T31	104	–	–	–	–	104
(United States)	Matt Kuchar	456	120	CUT	122	–	–	–	–	122
(India)	Anirban Lahiri	455	121	T56	118	–	–	–	–	118
(South Africa)	Dylan Frittelli	453	122	T56	119	–	–	–	–	119
(United States)	Brice Garnett	452	123	CUT	123	–	–	–	–	123
(United States)	Scott Stallings	447	124	CUT	124	–	–	–	–	124
(United States)	Chesson Hadley	440	125	CUT	125	–	–	–	–	125

* First-time Playoffs qualifier
DNP = Did not play
WD = Withdrew
