= Puntacana Resort and Club =

Resort in Punta Cana, Dominican Republic

Puntacana Resort & Club
- Location within the Dominican Republic

General information
- Location: Punta Cana, Dominican Republic
- Coordinates: 18°32′21″N 68°21′44″W
- Opening: 1971
- Owner: Frank Rainieri

Design and construction
- Developer: Frank Rainieri, Ted Kheel
- Other designers: Oscar de la Renta, Julio Iglesias

Website
- Puntacana.com; Puntacana.org

Puntacana Resort & Club is a resort and residential community located in Punta Cana, La Altagracia Province, Dominican Republic. The resort was established in 1969 by businessman and hotelier Frank Rainieri and Theodore Kheel, a New York labor lawyer.

== History and development ==
In 1969, Frank Rainieri, a Dominican entrepreneur in his 20s with a crop-dusting business, and Theodore Kheel, a New York attorney and labor mediator, acquired a 58-million-square-meter lot on the eastern end of the Dominican Republic, which was covered with jungle and six miles of beach. Their first project was a 40-guest hotel called the Punta Cana Club.

In 1979, they constructed the Puntacana Hotel, followed by the Punta Cana International Airport in 1984. In 2000, the first of the residential community developments began, and six years later, Tortuga Bay opened a boutique hotel designed by fashion designer Oscar de la Renta. Puntacana Resort & Club has since grown to 15,000 acres.

The Puntacana Foundation, made up of the Ecological Foundation and Community Services, has a 1,500-acre reserve that now serves as a research base for universities and a sanctuary for endangered species. The Puntacana Foundation has also opened two schools: the Ann & Ted Kheel Polytechnic and the Puntacana International School. The Foundation has a free health clinic in the local community of Véron.

== Amenities and facilities ==
The Puntacana Hotel

- The Puntacana Hotel: Initially a hotel property with 10 two-room villas in 1971, it now has 130 rooms and 21 beach casitas. The hotel was completely refurbished in October 2009 and offers activities such as windsurfing, kiteboarding, whale watching, waterskiing, canoeing, deep-sea and shallow-water fishing, snorkelling, and scuba diving.
- The Westin Puntacana Resort & Club: a Westin Resort property with 200 rooms and 10 suites, located in the Playa Blanca area of Puntacana Resort & Club.
- Tortuga Bay: Made of 13 private beach villas, this upscale boutique hotel, one of the "Leading Hotels of the World," was built in 2006 and designed by Oscar de la Renta.
- Restaurants: Options include the Oscar de la Renta-designed restaurant Bamboo at Tortuga Bay, the beachside restaurant at Playa Blanca, award-winning La Yola at the marina, and the Westin Puntacana Resort and Club seaside Braza restaurant.
- Six Senses Spa: The spa has eight indoor private treatment rooms, four outdoors palapas overlooking the beach and staff from around the world. Some spa treatments include local medicinal plants.
- Real estate: The resort's five private residential communities, known collectively as The Estates, are Tortuga, Hacienda, Arrecife, La Marina and Corales (the most exclusive of the communities). Corales residents include Julio Iglesias and Mikhail Baryshnikov.
- Golf: The resort has two golf courses: P.B. Dye's 27-hole La Cana, which opened in 2001 and "the first course in the Caribbean to use paspalum, a grass seed that can be watered using seawater," with its additional 9-hole course located in the Hacienda community, and the 18-hole Corales, opened in 2010 and designed by Tom Fazio. La Cana was the first full 18-hole course in Punta Cana.
- Racket sports: The Oscar de la Renta Tennis Center complex is made up of 11 tennis courts: nine clay, one natural grass and one hard (DecoTurf). a gym, four padel and two pickleball courts. It hosts an annual charity tournament, the Oscar de la Renta Social Tennis Tournament and an annual padel tournament.

== Puntacana Foundation's Social Projects ==
The Puntacana Foundation's Social Projects office, established in August 1998, focuses on promoting and assisting in local education, health care, culture, and community organization of the underserved in and around the Punta Cana region of the Dominican Republic through a variety of activities, projects and collaborations.

It has worked with development-focused entities such as Save The Children, USAID, the Virginia College of Osteopathic Medicine, the Punta Cana Rotary Club, La Altagracia Tourism Cluster, the Punta Cana Hotels Association, Universidad APEC, Instituto Ciencias Visuales de España, the Dominican Government's Ministries of Health and of Culture, the Verón Municipality, the United States Chamber of Commerce, Pack For a Purpose, as well as others. The Foundation is part of both the Clinton Global Initiative and the United Nations Global Compact communities.

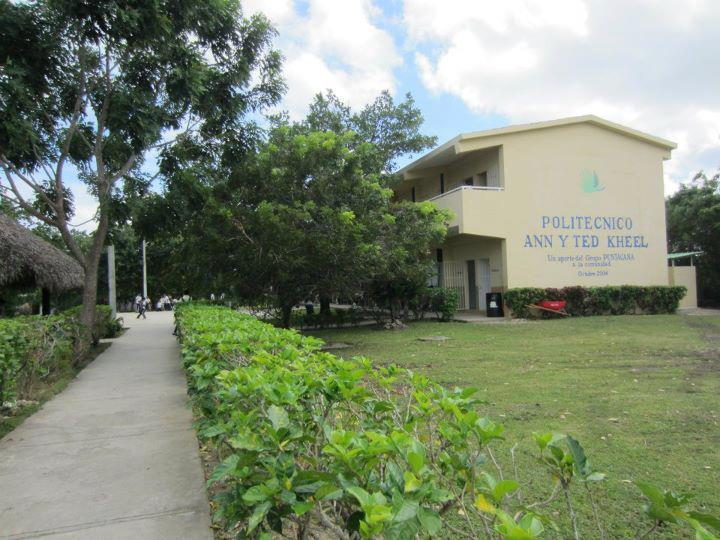
Ann & Ted Kheel Polytechnic School

One of the Puntacana Foundation's current areas of action is with the Ann & Ted Kheel Polytechnic School in Verón. The school was built by the foundation in 2004 and is the only public high school within 50 miles of Punta Cana International Airport. The school teaches technical and adult education classes such as hospitality, English language, computer applications, refrigeration, electricity, and plumbing. The school is said to be an "outstanding contribution to the development of the Eastern region." The Puntacana International School in Punta Cana was built, is managed, and is maintained by the foundation. It is a modern, bilingual, private school for Puntacana Resort and Club's employees' children. The foundation also assists and manages the procurement of school-related item donations, such as sports equipment and classroom paraphernalia, the maintenance and upgrading of various Punta Cana region public schools, and the education and training of public school teachers, as well as student educational workshops.

The Verón Rural Clinic, renovated in 2006 in cooperation with the Virginia College of Osteopathic Medicine (VCOM) and the Dominican Ministry of Health, is a free public health clinic with an average of 150 patients per day. The clinic has a laboratory, examination rooms, a sonographic machine, an ambulance and a separate pediatric unit. The foundation is also involved with improving the health education of local doctors and the community, supporting and managing health care activities such as VCOM's medical missions and free ophthalmological exams and surgeries during certain times of the year.

The foundation promotes local artists through the Puntacana Art Gallery, cultural festivals such as the Puntacana Carnival, a yearly symphonic orchestra and choir concert, a softball and baseball field in Véron and a basketball and volleyball court at the Ann & Ted Kheel Polytechnic School.

== The Ecological Foundation ==
The Ecological Foundation's Center for Sustainability

The Puntacana Ecological Foundation was created in 1994 and is focused on the protection of the natural flora and fauna within the Punta Cana region. With a stated goal of contributing to the sustainable development of the Dominican Republic and creating "(environmental/conservation) interchanges with prestigious universities to develop education and research programs", the Ecology facility has collaborated with educational entities such as Cornell University, Columbia University, Harvard University, Virginia Tech, Rutgers University, Syracuse University, the Rosenstiel School of Marine, Atmospheric, and Earth Science at the University of Miami, Stevens Institute of Technology, the University of South Carolina, Leiden University in the Netherlands, and the University of Puerto Rico.

Ecological Foundation's research and education facility, the Center for Sustainability, was established in 1999 and focuses on the environmental challenges related to local tourism. The center has laboratories, classrooms, offices, a library, and a dormitory with extended stay facilities.

The Partnership for Ecologically-Sustainable Coastal Areas (PESCA) includes eight kilometers of protected reefs. PESCA seeks to balance the continued growth and development of the region, the long-term health and sustainability of the coastal zone and coral reef and assisting in sustainable fisheries management. Conservation practices of endangered species such as the endemic Ridgway's hawk and the hawksbill turtle include extensive monitoring and habitat protection.

The Ecological Foundation also has a park and reserve named "Indigenous Eyes". The park is a lowland subtropical forest covering 1,500 acres of land with twelve freshwater lagoons. A petting zoo, a sugarcane exhibit and an iguana habitat are located near the center, as well as a fruit tree garden, a worm composting facility that converts solid waste into high-quality organic soil, an integrated solid waste management program for the entirety of Puntacana Resort & Club, a vegetable nursery and a small-scale beekeeping operation.

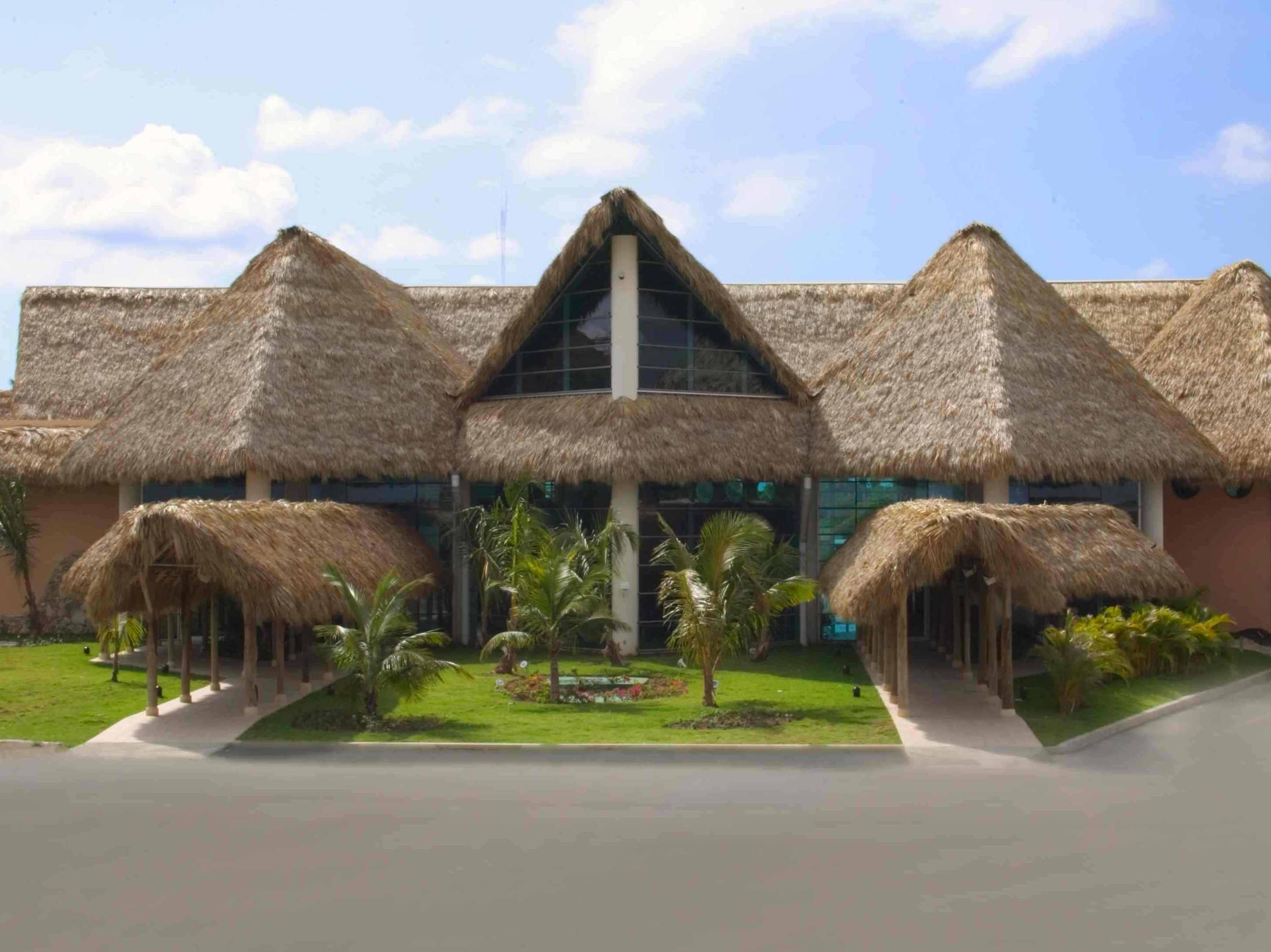
The Punta Cana International Airport with its traditional thatched palm-frond roof.

== Punta Cana International Airport ==
The Punta Cana International Airport (PUJ), built in 1984 and located just 5 minutes from the resort, is a privately owned commercial airport and the second busiest airport in the Caribbean. Owned and operated by Grupo PUNTACANA, it currently has four million passengers annually.

== Awards ==
- 2021: Nominated as "Best Golf Course" and "Best Golf Hotel" of the Dominican Republic in the World Golf Awards (WGA) 2021.
- 2012: Oscar de la Renta-designed Bamboo Restaurant of Puntacana Resort & Club's Tortuga Bay won the AAA Four Diamond Award (0.25% of over 37,000 AAA-approved restaurants achieve this distinction.)
- 2012 & 2011: Puntacana Resort & Club's La Yola Restaurant is awarded the AAA Three Diamond Award (less than 3% of over 37,000 AAA-approved restaurants achieve this distinction.)
- November 2010: The Puntacana Foundation, along with the organization Save the Children, won the Texaco Award due to a joint community project promoting education in the eastern Dominican Republic.
- 2010: Received the Golf Resort of the Year Award from the International Association of Golf Tour Operators, an award established in 2000 to recognize the exceptional resorts in the world of golf travel.
- June 2009: Due to the ecological and community service activities of the Puntacana Foundation, Puntacana Resort & Club won the Condé Nast Traveler's World Savers Award.
- March 2009: Won the Clean Development prize for Central America and the Caribbean for its integrated solid waste management program by the Central Committee for Environment and Development.
- January 2009: Received the Destination Stewardship Award from the World Tourism and Travel Council for being "a pioneer in sustainable tourism management with nearly three decades of innovative work in the Dominican Republic".
- May 2008: Was listed in Island Magazine's 100 most socially responsible resorts in the world.
- November 2007: Tortuga Bay, owned by Puntacana Resort & Club, received the Leading Hotels of the World prize for excellence in environmental practices.
- October 2007: The Ecological Foundation received the Brugal Cree en su gente Prize for Excellence in Environmental Protection.
- September 2007: The Ecological Foundation received the annual prize for Corporate Social Responsibility from the American Chamber of Commerce in the Dominican Republic.
