= The Match (golf) =

Series of exhibition match play golf challenge matches

- Genre: Sport
- Country of origin: United States
- No. of episodes: 11

Production
- Production locations: Las Vegas, Nevada; Hobe Sound, Florida; Oro Valley, Arizona; Big Sky, Montana
- Running time: 4 hours

Original release
- Network: TNT Sports
- Release: November 23, 2018 – present

The Match is a series of exhibition match play golf challenge matches that began in 2018. The event features major professional golfers or other notable athletes facing each other in a head-to-head competition. The format has varied throughout the run of the event; in all of the events, sports entertainment elements were included, particularly with the inclusion of sports betting elements in that the contestants wager portions of their prize on side bets during the contest. Most years since 2020, two iterations of The Match have been held each year, alternating between contests involving professional golfers (usually in November or December, outside the PGA Tour season) and contests involving celebrity athletes from other sports, with or without golf professionals; one of the two contests is traditionally held on the weekend before or after Thanksgiving. TNT Sports (formerly Turner Sports) has televised all iterations of the event through 2024, with the offseason contests airing as part of TNT's holiday seasonal programming. In 2025, the producers opted to produce a different competition, the Golf Channel Games, for Golf Channel.

== Background ==
Jack Whigham, a Hollywood agent, and Bryan Zuriff, a film and TV producer, conceived the event. Zuriff was a fan of the Skins Game—a former PGA Tour unofficial event that was held around Thanksgiving weekend and would eventually be revived in 2025—and envisioned a concept for a golf event that would, as explained by Whigham, be "played the way a lot of us play with our buddies on the weekends? You know, where you bet on everything and talk smack and basically have this continually running dialogue of giving each other (grief.)"

Mark Steinberg, an agent who represented Tiger Woods (who competed in the first two events), contrasted the event with Monday Night Golf—a series of primetime, network television events largely intended to be a vehicle for Woods at the height of his popularity—stating that it would feature both sports and entertainment elements and not be focused purely on competitive aspects. The event would be jointly owned by Woods and Phil Mickelson (an associate of Zuriff's and a competitor in the first four entries), but the entity still had to pay a rights fee to the PGA Tour—which would impose some restrictions and conditions on the presentation and format of the event.

== Event details ==
=== Tiger vs. Phil ===
The first edition, titled The Match: Tiger vs. Phil, was played on November 23, 2018, between Tiger Woods and Phil Mickelson, at the Shadow Creek Golf Course in North Las Vegas, Nevada. The purse for the event was $9 million, with the winner taking the entire amount. Mickelson won the match after 22 holes, including four playoff holes. The event was marketed as a pay per view by Turner Sports via Bleacher Report Live, but technical issues with the over-the-top distribution of the PPV forced the event to instead be streamed for free; Turner and other providers subsequently offered refunds.

=== Champions for Charity ===
A rematch, The Match: Champions for Charity, was played on May 24, 2020, at Medalist Golf Club in Hobe Sound, Florida. It featured a pro-am four-ball format with each golfer having a National Football League quarterback as his partner: Woods was paired with two-time Super Bowl champion Peyton Manning, and Mickelson with then six-time Super Bowl champion quarterback Tom Brady. Woods and Manning held off a late comeback from Mickelson and Brady to win by a single hole.

The match was broadcast live on TNT, TBS, HLN and truTV, drawing an average 2.8 million viewers, due in part to the fact that it was one of the first nationally televised live sports events to take place after sports worldwide were shut down in March. Brian Anderson was the host of the event, Trevor Immelman and Charles Barkley served as analysts, and Justin Thomas and Amanda Balionis were on-course reporters.

=== Champions for Change ===
A third edition, titled The Match: Champions For Change, took place on November 27, 2020, at Stone Canyon Golf Club in Oro Valley, Arizona. The match, benefitting historically black colleges and universities, was played using an American foursomes format. Mickelson partnered NBA hall-of-famer Charles Barkley, who played from a forward set of tees, to defeat Manning and NBA star Stephen Curry, 4 and 3.

The event was broadcast live on TNT, earning an average 1.0 million viewers. Anderson and Immelman returned as host and analyst, respectively, alongside NBA star Andre Iguodala, who was also an analyst. Gary McCord and Cheyenne Woods served as on-course reporters. Additionally, a "Cart Cam" stream was made available for the event exclusively through Bleacher Report with host Taylor Rooks and on-course correspondent Eli Manning.

=== The Match IV ===
A fourth edition of The Match took place on July 6, 2021. Mickelson and Brady competed against Green Bay Packers quarterback Aaron Rodgers and professional golfer Bryson DeChambeau at The Reserve at Moonlight Basin in Big Sky, Montana. There was a slight change to the format, with greensomes replacing the American foursomes format used in the previous edition. DeChambeau and Rodgers won the match 3 and 2.

The fourth iteration of The Match was broadcast live on TNT, TBS, and truTV on July 6, 2021. Anderson, Barkley, and Immelman all returned as host and analysts, respectively, alongside NFL star Larry Fitzgerald, who made his debut on The Match an analyst. Cheyenne Woods returned as on-course reporter. Kevin Frazier of Entertainment Tonight also made his debut on The Match as the pre-match host, alongside Barkley, Fitzgerald, and Immelman.

=== Bryson vs. Brooks ===
A fifth edition took place between DeChambeau and Brooks Koepka on November 26, 2021, at Wynn Golf Club in Las Vegas. The match was a result of an ongoing "feud" between the two players. The format for the fifth version of the match returned to the original format of Tiger vs. Phil, with the length of the match reduced to 12 holes. It was again broadcast across the outlets of Turner Sports, averaging 1.2 million viewers.

Neither player had ideal preparation for the match, with Koepka missing the cut in his previous two tournaments and DeChambeau having played no tournament golf for two months. Koepka won four of the first eight holes, and claimed victory when DeChambeau failed to make his birdie putt on the ninth green and conceded. The players continued to play the next two holes, where DeChambeau won the longest drive and nearest the pin spot prizes for charity.

=== The Match VI ===
The sixth edition of The Match was announced April 18, 2022 to be held on June 1, with a roster consisting entirely of American football quarterbacks: Brady and Rodgers were paired against Josh Allen and Patrick Mahomes. It used a shamble format. Brady and Rodgers defeated Allen and Mahomes by one hole; the contest came down to the final putt, with Rodgers sinking the winning putt and Allen narrowly missing a long birdie putt that would have sent the match to a playoff.

This was the first edition of The Match to be distributed internationally via Eurosport, GolfTV, and Discovery+, following the merger of Discovery Inc. with Turner Sports parent company WarnerMedia to form Warner Bros. Discovery. GolfTV had previously attempted to run its own, similar franchise of golf events as part of a content deal with Woods. Ernie Johnson and Charles Barkley served as commentators for the competition.

=== The Match VII ===
The seventh edition of The Match was held in prime time on December 10, 2022, at Pelican Golf Club in Belleair, Florida. A mostly new roster of professional golfers took part after Mickelson, Koepka and DeChambeau were expelled from the PGA for competing in LIV Golf. Rory McIlroy paired with Woods—competing in his first televised event since the 2022 Open Championship, and still recovering from injuries sustained in a 2021 car crash—against Jordan Spieth and Justin Thomas in a four-ball event. Spieth and Thomas defeated Woods and McIlroy 3 and 2 in the 12-hole event.

=== The Match VIII ===
The eighth edition of The Match was held on June 29, 2023, at Wynn Golf Club. This edition featured two championship-winning duos from different leagues, as Kansas City Chiefs teammates Patrick Mahomes and Travis Kelce beat Golden State Warriors teammates Stephen Curry and Klay Thompson.

The contest, which Mahomes and Kelce won decisively, was the least-watched event in the series, dropping to 782,000 viewers across all simulcast partners.

=== The Match IX ===
The ninth edition of The Match was held February 26, 2024 at The Park Golf Course in West Palm Beach, Florida; it was a 12-hole skins game played between Max Homa, Rory McIlroy, Lexi Thompson, and Rose Zhang, and the first to involve LPGA players. This edition was delayed from its originally planned December 15 date after discussions with The Park Golf Club fell through due to schedule conflicts. The winner was eventually decided with a one-shot chip-off, in which Mcllroy hit closest-to-the-pin. The final scoring had Mcllroy with 10 skins, Thompson with two, and the others with zero.

=== The Match Superstars ===
The tenth edition of The Match, billed as The Match Superstars, featured an all-celebrity format held at Breakers West Country Club in West Palm Beach, Florida. Four teams of two—Wayne Gretzky & Bill Murray; Charles Barkley & Ken Griffey Jr.; Michael Phelps & Mark Wahlberg; and Blake Griffin & Nate Bargatze—competed in a quarterfinal, with the partners split up and playing two knockout rounds of match play, each nine holes, to determine a winner. The Match Superstars is the first to be pre-recorded; it was not announced until after the PGA/LIV edition of The Match (see below) and not until after the tournament had already been played. An edited compilation of the contest was carried on the outlets of TNT Sports in prime time November 21 and 22, 2024. Phelps & Wahlberg and Gretzky & Murray advanced to the quarterfinals, with Phelps and Gretzky reaching the final round and Gretzky winning by two holes in the final.

=== The Showdown ===
The eleventh edition of The Match, branded as the Crypto.com Showdown, featured DeChambeau and Koepka from LIV Golf and McIlroy and Scottie Scheffler from the PGA Tour. It was described as a "grudge match" between the two tours after three years of acrimony following the launch of LIV Golf in 2022. Since then, leading players from both circuits had typically only competed together during the major championships and the Olympic Games due to the PGA Tour's policy of suspending participants in LIV Golf events. The match was played on December 17, 2024, at Shadow Creek Golf Course, the site of the first edition of The Match. McIlroy described the invitation of LIV golfers into The Match as a "goodwill event" intended to "energize the fans" and heal a feud between the two circuits' golfers that had "gone on long enough." Uniquely for The Match, the four did not compete for prize money and instead received a set appearance fee in cryptocurrency from a $10,000,000 sponsorship by Crypto.com.

The match was made up of three match play segments: four-ball, foursomes and singles. The contest was won by McIlroy and Scheffler, who won both pairs matches before clinching the win when Scheffler guaranteed a tie in his singles match against Koepka. The Showdown was largely considered a disappointment due to a combination of midweek scheduling and the absence of the trademark banter that had been The Match's distinguishing characteristic.

=== Replacement with the Golf Channel Games ===
In August 2025, it was reported that Zuriff, McIlroy, and Scheffler were planning a follow-up to the Showdown to be held in December 2025, except that it would be produced with Golf Channel rather than TNT Sports. Scheffler and McIlroy would return, while no LIV Golf players would be invited, so to regain the endorsement of the PGA Tour after the Showdown had drawn its ire. Former The Match producer Jeff Neubarth was not involved in the new competition, as he had moved on to relaunch the Skins Game that November.

In October 2025, the event was later confirmed as the Golf Channel Games, which were held on December 17, 2025, at the Trump National Golf Club Jupiter in Jupiter, Florida. The event was structured as a skills competition, with McIlroy and Scheffler as captains of four-player teams competing in various timed distance and accuracy contests, with Scheffler's team winning the contest.

A second edition of the Golf Channel Games was announced in July 2026. It will again be held on the third Wednesday in December (December 16) at Trump National Golf Club.

== Television coverage ==
Since its inception through 2024, The Match has been televised by platforms owned by TNT Sports.

The inaugural edition was televised via pay-per-view through traditional television providers and Bleacher Report's live streaming platform B/R Live. However, after facing technical difficulties with B/R Live's payment system that prevented some customers from accessing the purchased PPV, B/R Live quietly dropped the pay-per-view and elected to stream The Match for free. B/R Live, as well as other cable providers, issued refunds.

Since then, The Match has been aired on cable television by TNT, select editions have also been simulcast on TBS, TruTV or HLN. Since 2022, The Match has also been distributed internationally via Eurosport, GolfTV, and Discovery+, all of which are owned by TNT Sports' parent company.

=== US viewership ===
| Date | Title | USA TV | Average USA viewership | Source |
|---|---|---|---|---|
| November 28, 2018 | The Match: Tiger vs. Phil | Pay-per-view; B/R Live | Unknown | |
| May 24, 2020 | The Match: Champions for Charity | TNT; TBS; TruTV; HLN | 5,800,000 | |
| November 27, 2020 | The Match: Champions For Change | TNT | 1,000,000 | |
| July 6, 2021 | The Match IV | TNT; TBS; TruTV | 1,700,000 | |
| November 26, 2021 | The Match: Bryson vs. Brooks | TNT; TBS; TruTV; HLN | 1,200,000 | |
| June 1, 2022 | The Match VI | TNT; TruTV; HLN | 1,500,000 | |
| December 10, 2022 | The Match VII | TNT; TBS; TruTV; HLN | 1,400,000 | |
| June 29, 2023 | The Match VIII | TNT; TruTV; HLN | 773,000 | |
| February 26, 2024 | The Match IX | TNT; TruTV; HLN | 511,000 | |
| November 22, 2024 | The Match Superstars | TNT | 150,000 | |
| December 17, 2024 | The Match: The Showdown | TNT; TBS truTV | 625,000 | |

== Results ==
| Date | Title | Winner(s) | Score | Opponent(s) | Location | Course |
|---|---|---|---|---|---|---|
| Nov 23, 2018 | Tiger vs. Phil (Note: Unofficial money event on the PGA Tour.) | Phil Mickelson | 22 holes | Tiger Woods | North Las Vegas, Nevada | Shadow Creek Golf Course |
| May 24, 2020 | Champions For Charity | Tiger Woods and Peyton Manning | 1 up | Phil Mickelson and Tom Brady | Hobe Sound, Florida | Medalist Golf Club |
| Nov 27, 2020 | Champions For Change | Phil Mickelson and Charles Barkley | 4 and 3 | Stephen Curry and Peyton Manning | Oro Valley, Arizona | Stone Canyon Golf Club |
| Jul 6, 2021 | The Match IV | Bryson DeChambeau and Aaron Rodgers | 3 and 2 | Phil Mickelson and Tom Brady | Big Sky, Montana | The Reserve at Moonlight Basin |
| Nov 26, 2021 | Bryson vs. Brooks | Brooks Koepka | 5 and 3 (Note: The final score was reported during the broadcast, and in some news reports, as 4 and 3.) | Bryson DeChambeau | Paradise, Nevada | Wynn Golf Club |
| Jun 1, 2022 | Brady/Rodgers vs. Allen/Mahomes | Tom Brady and Aaron Rodgers | 1 up | Josh Allen and Patrick Mahomes | Paradise, Nevada | Wynn Golf Club |
| Dec 10, 2022 | The Match VII | Jordan Spieth and Justin Thomas | 3 and 2 | Rory McIlroy and Tiger Woods | Belleair, Florida | Pelican Golf Club |
| Jun 29, 2023 | The Match VIII | Patrick Mahomes and Travis Kelce | 3 and 2 | Stephen Curry and Klay Thompson | Paradise, Nevada | Wynn Golf Club |
| Feb 26, 2024 | The Match IX | Rory McIlroy | 10–2–0–0 | Lexi Thompson, Max Homa, Rose Zhang | West Palm Beach, Florida | Park City Municipal Golf Course |
| Nov 22, 2024 | The Match Superstars | Wayne Gretzky | 2 up | Michael Phelps | West Palm Beach, Florida | Breakers West Golf Club |
| Dec 17, 2024 | The Showdown | Rory McIlroy and Scottie Scheffler | 3 and 2, 1 up, 1 up | Bryson DeChambeau and Brooks Koepka | North Las Vegas, Nevada | Shadow Creek Golf Course |
