= Gillisonville Baptist Church =

Historic church in South Carolina, United States

- U.S. National Register of Historic Places
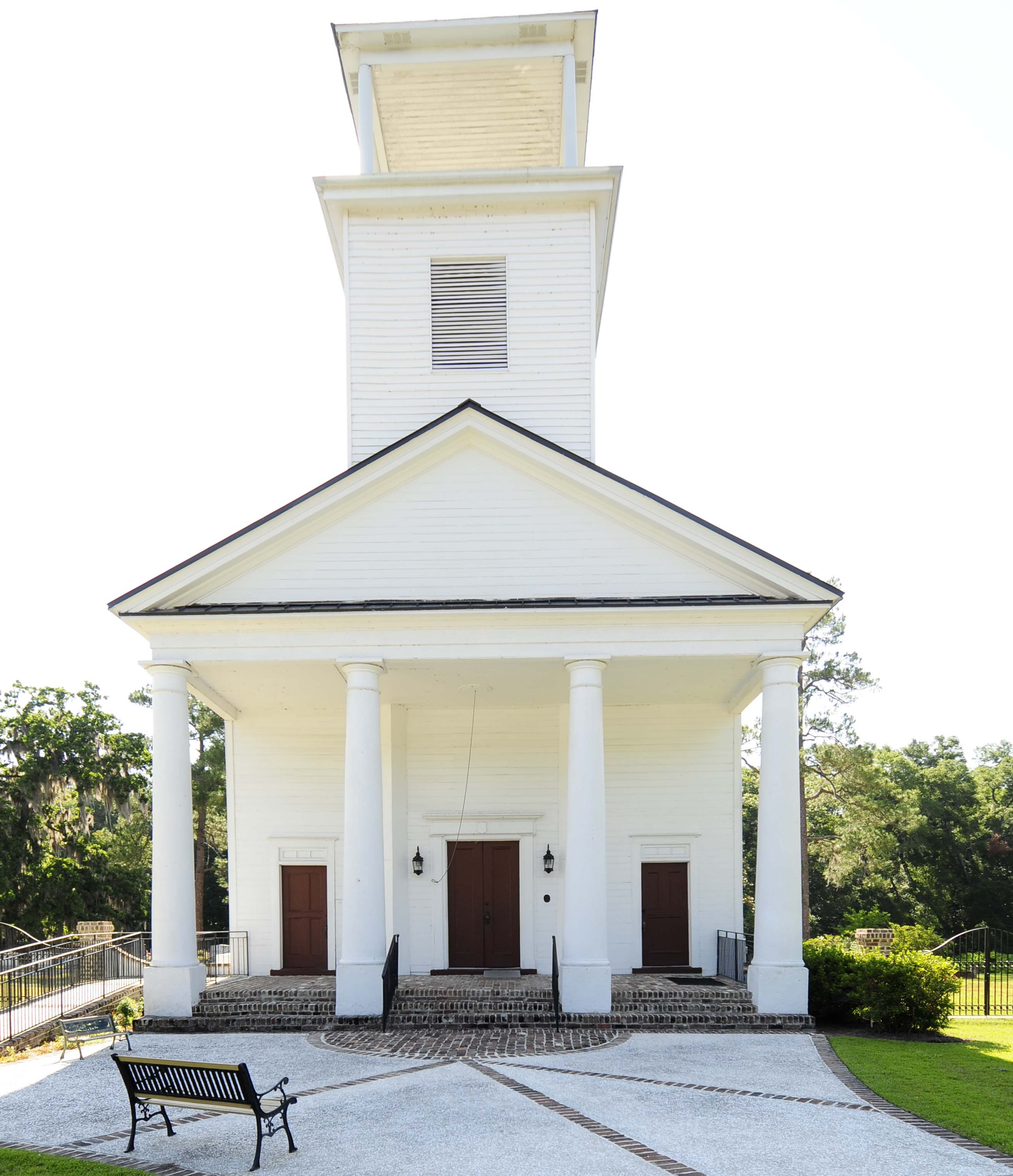
- Gillisonville Baptist Church, June 2012

- Location within South Carolina Location within the United States
- Location: U.S. 278, Gillisonville, South Carolina
- Coordinates: 32°36′26″N 80°59′52″W
- Area: 9 acres (3.6 ha)
- Built: 1838
- Architectural style: Greek Revival
- NRHP reference No.: 71000786
- Added to NRHP: May 14, 1971

Gillisonville Baptist Church is a historic Southern Baptist church on U.S. 278 in Gillisonville, Jasper County, South Carolina. It was built in 1838, and is in the Greek Revival style. Notable features include the a portico supported by Doric order columns on pedestals. In February 1865, General William Tecumseh Sherman's troops visited the church and etched "War of 1861-62-63-64. Feb. 1865. This is done by a Yankee Soldier," on the communion silver. The congregation became Gillisonville Baptist Church on November 19, 1885.

It was added to the National Register of Historic Places in 1971.
