= Palmetto Championship =

Golf tournament formerly on the PGA Tour

Tournament information
- Location: Gillisonville, South Carolina
- Established: 2021
- Course: Congaree Golf Club
- Par: 71
- Length: 7,685 yards (7,027 m)
- Tour: PGA Tour
- Format: Stroke play
- Prize fund: US$7,300,000
- Month played: June
- Final year: 2021

Tournament record score
- Aggregate: 273 Garrick Higgo (2021)
- To par: −11 as above

Final champion
- (South Africa) Garrick Higgo

Location map
- Location in the United States Location in South Carolina

The Palmetto Championship at Congaree was a PGA Tour stroke play event that was played for the first time from June 10–13, 2021 at Congaree Golf Club in Gillisonville near Ridgeland, South Carolina. The event was announced April 2, 2021 and was a one-time event, as a replacement to the 2021 RBC Canadian Open which was canceled due to logistical challenges related to the ongoing COVID-19 pandemic.

Garrick Higgo won the event by one stroke in just his second PGA Tour start.

== Winners ==
Year	Winner	Score	To par	Margin of victory	Runners-up	Purse (US$)	Winner's share ($)
2021	(South Africa) Garrick Higgo	273	−11	1 stroke	(United States) Chesson Hadley (England) Tyrrell Hatton (United States) Doc Redman (United States) Hudson Swafford (United States) Bo Van Pelt (Venezuela) Jhonattan Vegas	7,300,000	1,314,000
