= Congaree Golf Club =

Private golf club in South Carolina, US

Congaree
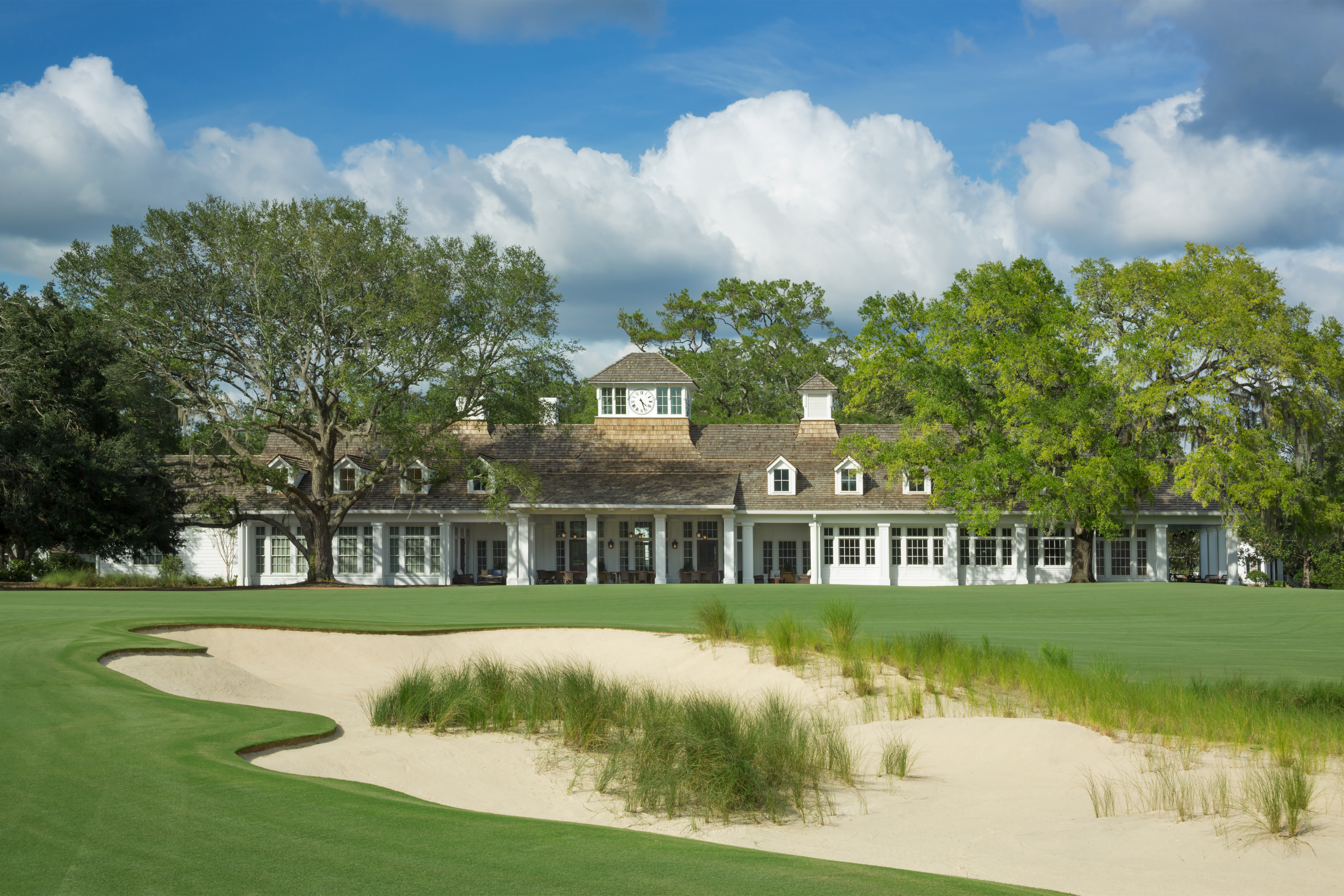

- Gillisonville, SC Congaree Golf Club (South Carolina)
- 32.602°N 81.003°W

Club information
- Location: Gillisonville, South Carolina
- Established: 2018
- Type: private
- Owner: The Friedkin Group
- Operator: Congaree Foundation
- Tota holes: 18
- Tournaments: Palmetto Championship (2021); CJ Cup (2022–present)
- Greens: Bermuda
- Website: congareefoundation.org
- Designed by: Tom Fazio
- Par: 71
- Length: 7,685
- Congaree Logo

Congaree is a private golf course in South Carolina in Jasper County outside Ridgeland in unincorporated Gillisonville.

== General information ==
Situated on a historic 18th-century estate, and surrounded by over 2,000 acres of lakes and longleaf pine forests in South Carolina's Lowcountry, architect Tom Fazio designed the championship course to fit in with its natural surroundings.

Congaree was named Golf Digest's best new private course for 2018, and it was named the best golf course built during the decade of 2010–19. The club was ranked 39th in Golf Digest's America's 100 Greatest Golf Courses 2021–2022.

With the 2021 RBC Canadian Open's cancellation due to logistical challenges related to the ongoing COVID-19 pandemic, Congaree was selected to host that week's PGA Tour event. It was called the Palmetto Championship at Congaree and took place from June 10–13, 2021. The winner was Garrick Higgo and it marked his first career PGA Tour win.

It was announced on June 29, 2022, that the PGA TOUR's CJ Cup would be hosted at Congaree the week of October 17–23, 2022, after the event was contested in Las Vegas at Shadow Creek Golf Course and The Summit Club the previous two years. The name of the tournament has been changed to THE CJ CUP in South Carolina.

In the fall of 2023, Congaree was selected to host the 2025 Arnold Palmer Cup to be played at the course June 5–7 of that year. The Ryder Cup-style amateur event features the top men's and women's collegiate golfers, matching a U.S. team against a team of international players (12 men & 12 women per team).

== History ==
Prior to the development of Congaree into a golf course, it had long been an estate known by other names. Its earliest known date of existence is 1770, when John Hobard received a grant for 100 acres for services rendered to King George III. From 1811 to 1828 it went through three different owners with Richard James Davant purchasing the estate from his father in law and changing the name to Davant Plantation. The original Greek Revival home was burned by order of Maj. Gen. William Tecumseh Sherman in 1865 along with much of the rest of Gillisonville, SC. Only two auxiliary buildings survived. Davant dismantled a much simpler, circa 1820 house that was located on a nearby plantation, which he also owned, and transferred it piece-by-piece to the site of his former home.

From 1938 to 1991 the property was transferred three more times, ultimately to Mr. and Mrs. B. H. Rutledge Moore. The Moores resided on the plantation year-round and operated it as a quail hunting preserve.

In 1995 the historic house was the primary filming location for the movie Something to Talk About starring Julia Roberts.

In 2014 a North Carolina developer under the name Davant Farming and Timber Company bought the property. The development became Congaree. From 2015 to 2017, the historic house was renovated and other facilities were added to fit in with the style of the existing buildings. This included a lodge, several cottages and a 12-bedroom inn.

In September 2019 Congaree made an unsuccessful pitch at hosting the 2025 Presidents Cup.

== Foundation ==
The founders of Congaree – Dan Friedkin and the late Bob McNair – set out to create a new philanthropic model that unites ambassador-members with a shared purpose to positively impact the lives of young people, locally and around the globe, by providing educational and vocational opportunities through the game of golf. It currently supports programs with the Boys & Girls Clubs, Sergeant Jasper Golf Club in Ridgeland, SC, youth golf instruction at Ridgeland-Hardeeville High School, and the Lowcountry Food Bank.

The signature philanthropic program of the Congaree Foundation is the Congaree Global Golf Initiative, a college preparatory program for underserved high school students who aspire to play college golf. Each summer, participants come to Congaree for a week and receive golf instruction from teaching experts and work with academic and college counselors to help them overcome the barriers to playing college athletics.
