= Corales Golf Course =

Golf course in Punta Cana, La Altagracia

- Location within the Caribbean Location within the Dominican Republic
- 18.565285°N 68.3424819°W,

Club information
- Location: Punta Cana, La Altagracia, Dominican Republic
- Established: 2010
- Type: Private
- Owner: Puntacana Resort and Club
- Operator: Puntacana Resort and Club
- Tota holes: 18
- Tournaments: PGA Tour
- Greens: SeaShore Paspalum Supreme
- Website: Official website
- Designed by: Tom Fazio
- Par: 72
- Length: 7,670 yards (7,010 m)
- Course rating: 76.9
- Slope rating: 140

Corales Golf Course is a golf resort located Punta Cana, La Altagracia, in the Dominican Republic.

Part of the Puntacana Resort and Club, it was designed by Tom Fazio and opened in 2010. The golf course is irrigated with desalinated and recycled water and fertilized with composting organic fertilizer. The course hosts the PGA Tour event Corales Puntacana Championship since 2018, having served under the Korn Ferry Tour in 2016 and 2017. The course will host the 2026 Central American and Caribbean Games golf event.
