= Gillisonville, South Carolina =

Gillisonville
- Census-designated place
- Interactive map of Gillisonville
- Coordinates: 32°36′42″N 80°59′52″W
- Country: United States
- State: South Carolina
- County: Jasper

Area
  - Total: 1.18 sq mi (3.06 km^{2})
  - Land: 1.18 sq mi (3.06 km^{2})
  - Water: 0 sq mi (0.00 km^{2})
- Elevation: 72 ft (22 m)

Population (2020)
  - Total: 183
  - Density: 154.8/sq mi (59.76/km^{2})
- Time zone: UTC-5 (Eastern (EST))
  - Summer (DST): UTC-4 (EDT)
- ZIP code: 29936
- Area codes: 843 and 854
- FIPS code: 45-29140
- GNIS feature ID: 2812967

Gillisonville is an unincorporated community and census-designated place (CDP) in Jasper County, in the U.S. state of South Carolina. It was first listed as a CDP in the 2020 census with a population of 183.

== History ==
A post office called Gillisonville was in operation from 1840 until 1927. During the Civil War, Gillisonville was nearly obliterated by order of Maj. Gen. William Tecumseh Sherman.

Gillisonville Baptist Church is listed on the National Register of Historic Places.

Gillisonville has hosted PGA Tour since 2021 as replacement tournaments. During the 2020-21 season, the Palmetto Championship, a one-off tournament to replace the RBC Canadian Open, was held in June 2021. During the 2022-23 PGA Tour season, the CJ Cup, normally held in Korea, is slated to be held in Gillisonville.

== Transportation ==
The main roads through Gillisonville are U.S. Route 278 (Gray's Highway) and South Carolina Highway 462. SC 462 runs along Gillison Branch Road. then turns south along an overlap with US 278 before branching off again onto Morgandollar Road.

== Demographics ==
Historical population
Census	Pop.	Note	%±
2020	183		—
U.S. Decennial Census; 2020

Gillisonville first appeared as a census designated place in the 2020 U.S. census.

=== 2020 census ===
Gillisonville CDP, South Carolina – Demographic Profile (NH = Non-Hispanic)
Race / Ethnicity	Pop 2020	% 2020
White alone (NH)	111	60.66%
Black or African American alone (NH)	60	32.79%
Native American or Alaska Native alone (NH)	2	1.09%
Asian alone (NH)	0	0.00%
Pacific Islander alone (NH)	0	0.00%
Some Other Race alone (NH)	0	0.00%
Mixed Race/Multi-Racial (NH)	3	1.64%
Hispanic or Latino (any race)	7	3.83%
Total	183	100.00%

Note: the US Census treats Hispanic/Latino as an ethnic category. This table excludes Latinos from the racial categories and assigns them to a separate category. Hispanics/Latinos can be of any race.
