= The Match: Tiger vs. Phil =

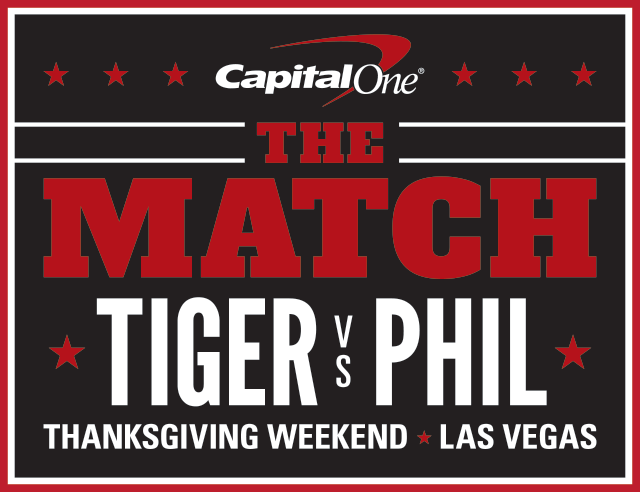

Tournament information
- Dates: November 23, 2018
- Location: North Las Vegas, Nevada; 36.258°N 115.105°W
- Course: Shadow Creek Golf Course
- Format: Match play

Statistics
- Par: 72
- Length: 7,560 yd (6,910 m)
- Prize fund: US$9,000,000

Champion
- (United States) Phil Mickelson
- 22 holes
- Location in the United States Location in Nevada

The Match: Tiger vs. Phil was a head-to-head match play golf challenge played on November 23, 2018 between Tiger Woods and Phil Mickelson, at the Shadow Creek Golf Course in North Las Vegas, Nevada. The purse for the unofficial PGA Tour event was $9 million, with the winner taking the entire amount. Mickelson won the match after 22 holes, including four playoff holes. After the success of the event, it became the first in an irregular series of events under the brand of The Match, with both Mickelson and Woods participating in the rematch (Champions for Charity), and Mickelson also participating in the two editions after that.

The event was marketed as a pay per view by Turner Sports via Bleacher Report Live, but technical issues with the over-the-top distribution of the PPV forced the event to instead be streamed for free; Turner and other providers subsequently offered refunds.

== Background ==
Jack Whigham, a Hollywood agent, and Bryan Zuriff, a film and TV producer, conceived the event. Zuriff was a fan of The Skins Game—a former PGA Tour unofficial event that was held around Thanksgiving weekend—and envisioned a concept for a golf event that would, as explained by Whigham, be "played the way a lot of us play with our buddies on the weekends? You know, where you bet on everything and talk smack and basically have this continually running dialogue of, pardon the expression, giving each other shit."

Gaining Mickelson's involvement was eased by both him and Zuriff being members of the Madison Club in La Quinta, California, while Mickelson was also a fan of the Showtime series Ray Donovan—which Zuriff executive produces. After the 2018 WGC-Mexico Championship (which marked Mickelson's first win since the 2013 Open Championship), the idea was introduced to Tiger Woods' management. Woods had recently returned to competition after undergoing back surgery, and tied for second the following week at the Valspar Championship, in his first top-five finish in a PGA Tour event since 2013.

Woods' agent Mark Steinberg contrasted the event with Monday Night Golf—a series of primetime, network television events largely intended to be a vehicle for Woods at the height of his popularity—stating that it would feature both sports and entertainment elements and not be focused purely on competitive aspects. The event would be jointly owned by Mickelson and Woods, but the entity still had to pay a rights fee to the PGA Tour—which would impose some restrictions and conditions on the presentation and format of the event.

The event was given a purse of $9 million; both golfers pledged to donate portions of the winnings to charity if they won, and plans were announced for the event's format to include side bets by its participants.

== Format ==
The two golfers played 18 holes of match play. Following the 18th hole, the golfers halved in a playoff resulting in a 93 yard 20th hole being played. The two golfers halved for two holes before Mickelson won it on the 22nd hole.

A prominently promoted feature of the event were side-bets, which counted separately from the main purse. Both golfers would be able to make wagers on per-hole challenges, with examples such as closest to the pin and longest drive.

== Result ==
Mickelson and Woods played 18 holes of match play, but they were tied after regulation play.

Hole	1	2	3	4	5	6	7	8	9	Out	10	11	12	13	14	15	16	17	18	In	Total
Yards	415	435	486	581	202	507	571	200	460	3,857	437	324	405	257	493	482	622	154	529	3,703	7,560
Par	4	4	4	5	3	4	5	3	4	36	4	4	4	3	4	4	5	3	5	36	72
Woods	AS						AS					AS	1 up	AS			AS	AS	AS	AS	AS
Mickelson	AS	1 up	1 up	1 up	1 up	1 up	AS	1 up	1 up	1 up	1 up	AS		AS	1 up	1 up	AS	AS	AS	AS	AS

Play then continued into extra holes, and Mickelson won.

Hole	19	20	21	22
Yards	529	93	93	93
Par	5	3	3	3
Woods	AS	AS	AS	
Mickelson	AS	AS	AS	1 up

=== Side bets ===
The following side bets were made during the event, with winnings going to charity:

Hole	Player	Bet	Proposition	Result
1	Mickelson	$200,000	Birdie	Lost
5	Woods and Mickelson	$100,000	Closest to the pin	Won by Mickelson
8	Woods and Mickelson	$200,000	Closest to the pin	Won by Mickelson
9	Woods and Mickelson	$1,000,000	Eagle in 2	Push
13	Woods and Mickelson	$300,000	Closest to the pin	Won by Mickelson

== Broadcast ==
Owing to the PGA Tour's involvement in the event, its current media partners had the right of first refusal to acquire the media rights to The Match. NBC and CBS declined, while a deal was nearly made with ESPN for the event to take place on Independence Day, but fell through at the last minute. The rights were ultimately acquired by AT&T, which had recently acquired Turner Sports' parent company Time Warner (now WarnerMedia). The event would be sold as a pay-per-view, and AT&T said that it would leverage all of its media properties and platforms, including linear television pay-per-view (such as AT&T U-verse and DirecTV, with the latter offering a 4K UHD feed with HDR for an additional fee; the event was also offered in traditional form by cable's In Demand and Dish's pay-per-view services), Bleacher Report, and WarnerMedia entertainment properties such as HBO (who broadcast 24/7: The Match on November 13, 2018) and TNT (which would air highlights). Turner announced plans to use the PGA Tour's analytics system ShotLink to provide real-time statistics throughout the broadcast, and integrate it with MGM's sports betting data to provide information on odds.

In Canada and the United States, The Match was intended to be broadcast as a pay-per-view via traditional television providers, and Bleacher Report's live streaming platform B/R Live. In the United Kingdom, the event was broadcast by Sky Sports Golf. Ernie Johnson Jr. served as play-by-play commentator, with Peter Jacobsen and Darren Clarke on color. NBA on TNT host Charles Barkley, as well as Samuel L. Jackson, were also involved in the broadcast.

After facing technical difficulties with B/R Live's payment system that prevented some customers from accessing the purchased PPV, B/R Live quietly dropped the pay-per-view and elected to stream The Match for free. Turner, as well as other providers, issued refunds. Turner stated that the freely available live stream attracted 750,000 unique views; Turner Broadcasting president David Levy stated that the event "surpassed expectations across all of our platforms", and blamed the server issues on "really insufficient memory, server capacity that was required, and the high volume of consumer access requests in a condensed amount of time", especially on Black Friday.

Country	Broadcasters			
Country	Free-to-air	Cable/pay television	PPV	Stream
United States (host)	—N/a		Bleacher Report	
Canada	—N/a		Bleacher Report	
Austria	—N/a	Sky Select		Sky Go
Germany	—N/a	Sky Select		Sky Go
Switzerland	—N/a	Sky Select		Sky Go
Switzerland	—N/a	My Sports		
Indonesia	—N/a	Dens TV		
Indonesia	—N/a		Telkomsel	
Ireland	—N/a	Sky Sports	—N/a	Sky Go
United Kingdom	—N/a	Sky Sports	—N/a	Sky Go
MENA	—N/a	OSN Sports Box Office		OSN Play
Philippines	—N/a	Sky Sports		Sky On Demand
Sub-Saharan Africa	—N/a	SuperSport	—N/a	DStv Now
