= Tom Fazio =

American golf course architect

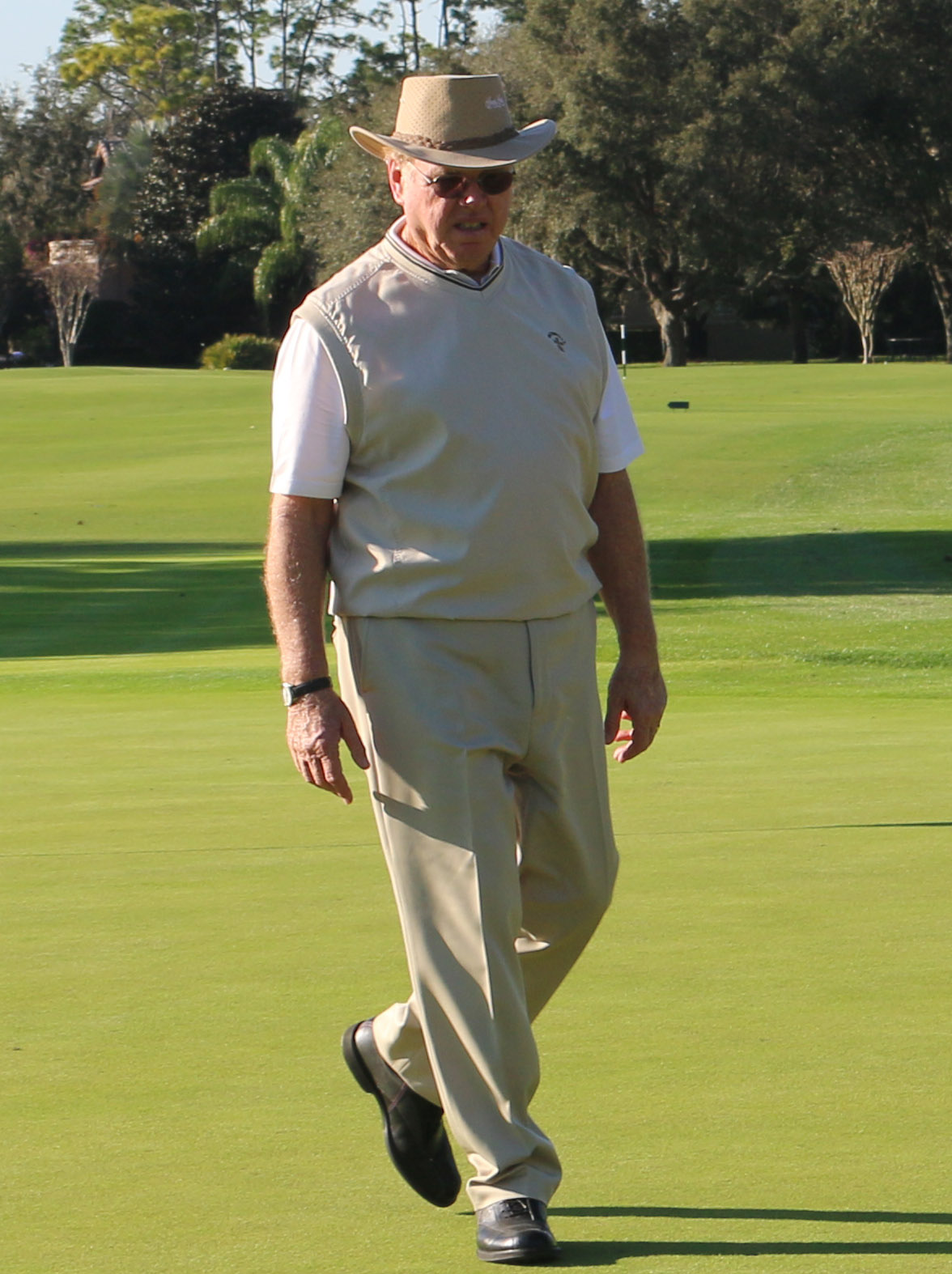
- Fazio in 2015
- Born: Thomas Fazio; February 10, 1945 (age 81)
- Occupation: Golf course architect

Thomas Fazio (born February 10, 1945) is an American golf course architect.

Fazio graduated in 1962 from Lansdale Catholic High School and was inducted into its hall of fame in 2007. He began his career in golf course design with his family's firm in suburban Philadelphia, which he left in the 1960s; he established his own firm in Jupiter, Florida in 1972. He is the nephew of George Fazio, who often credited Tom with jump-starting his own career in golf course architecture.

Fazio has designed more than 200 courses, 46 of which have been ranked by Golf Digest in their greatest 200 courses in the United States. His individual honors include "Best Modern Day Golf Course Architect", which he received from Golf Digest three times. In 1995, Fazio became the second course architect to receive the Old Tom Morris Award—the highest recognition awarded by the Golf Course Superintendents Association of America.

== Notable golf courses designed by Tom Fazio ==
The following is a partial list of courses designed by Fazio:

- OD denotes courses for which Fazio is the original designer
- R denotes courses reconstructed by Fazio

Name	Contribution	Year built	City / Town	State / Province	Country	Comments
Old Overton Club	OD	1993	Vestavia Hills	Alabama	United States	
Trump National GC Colts Neck	R	2005	Colts Neck Township	New Jersey	United States	Reconstructed by Fazio in 2009
The Estancia Club	OD	1995	Scottsdale	Arizona	United States	
Pelican Hill GC (North Course, South Course)	OD	2008	Newport Coast, Newport Beach	California	United States	36 holes
Oak Creek GC	OD		Irvine	California	United States	Risk of closure
Primm Valley GC	OD	1997	Nipton	California	United States	Closed
Rams Hill GC	OD		Borrego Springs	California	United States	
The Preserve GC	OD	1999	Carmel	California	United States	
Lake Nona G&CC	OD	1986	Orlando	Florida	United States	
PGA National Resort	OD	1980	Palm Beach Gardens	Florida	United States	
Conway Farms GC	OD	1991	Lake Forest	Illinois	United States	
Victoria National GC	OD	1996	Newburgh	Indiana	United States	
Squire Creek CC	OD	2002	Choudrant	Louisiana	United States	
Shadow Creek GC	OD	1990	Las Vegas	Nevada	United States	
Hudson National GC	OD		Croton-on-Hudson	New York	United States	
Pinehurst Resort No. 6 and No. 8	OD	1979; 1996	Pinehurst	North Carolina	United States	
Quail Hollow Club	R	1959	Charlotte	North Carolina	United States	
Firestone CC (West Course)	OD	1989	Akron	Ohio	United States	
Sand Ridge GC	OD	1998	Munson Township	Ohio	United States	
Sawmill Creek GC	OD		Huron	Ohio	United States	
Karsten Creek	OD	1994	Stillwater	Oklahoma	United States	
Congaree GC	OD	2018	Ridgeland	South Carolina	United States	
Osprey Point			Kiawah Island	South Carolina	United States	
TPC of Myrtle Beach	OD	1999	Burgess	South Carolina	United States	
The National GC of Canada	OD	1975	Woodbridge	Ontario	Canada	
Corales GC	OD	2010	Punta Cana	La Altagracia Province	Dominican Republic	
Adare Manor	R	2015	County Limerick	Munster	(Republic of Ireland) Ireland	
Augusta Municipal GC	R	2026	Augusta	Georgia	United States	
