= Shadow Creek Golf Course =

Golf course in North Las Vegas, Nevada

Coordinates: 36.257762°N 115.105959°W

Shadow Creek
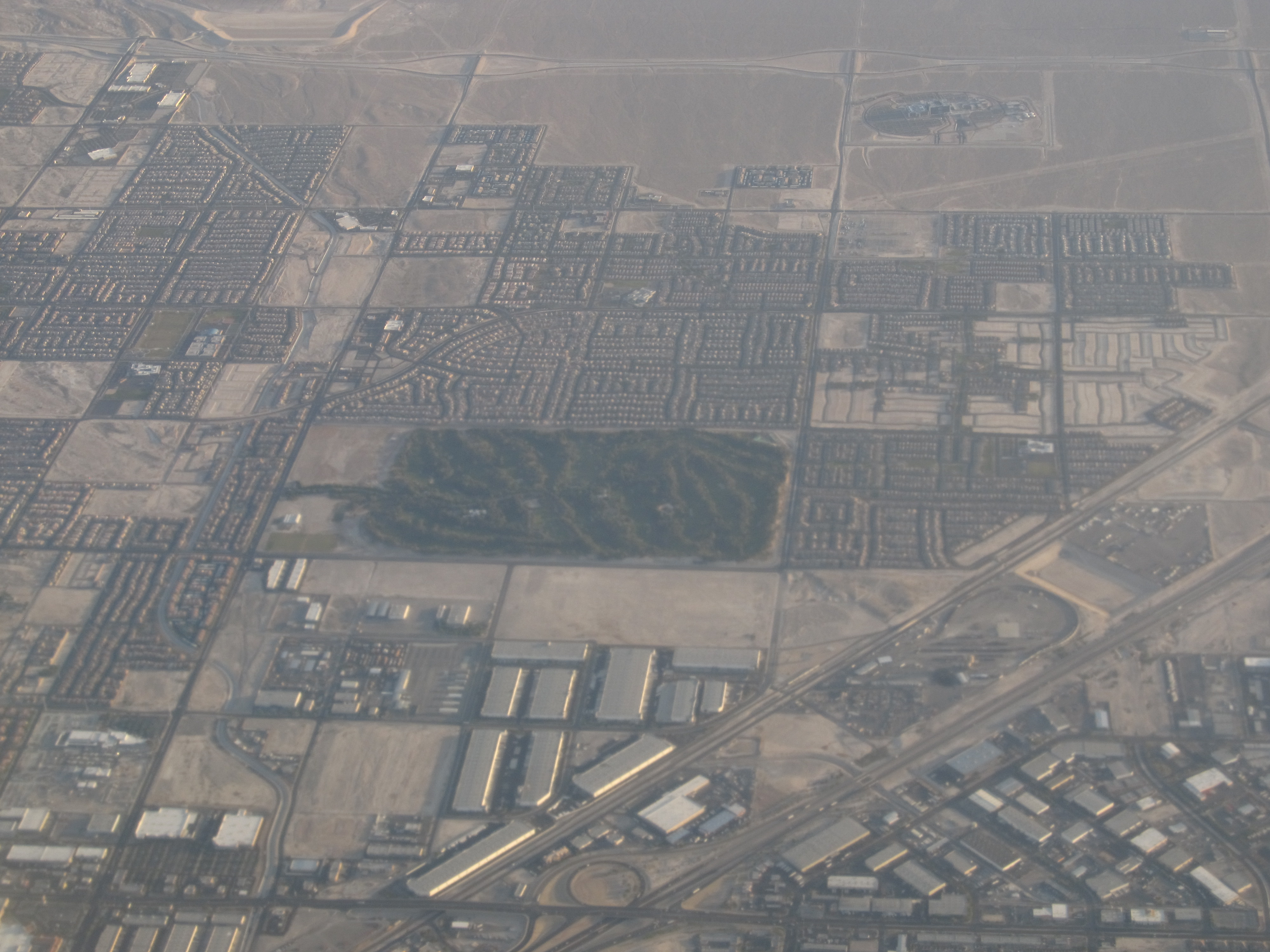
- Interactive map of Shadow Creek

Club information
- Location: 3 Shadow Creek Dr, North Las Vegas, NV 89031
- Established: 1990
- Type: Public
- Owner: MGM Resorts International
- Tota holes: 18
- Website: Shadow Creek Golf Course
- Designed by: Tom Fazio
- Par: 72
- Length: 7,560 yards (6,910 m)
- Course rating: 74.5
- Slope rating: 145

Shadow Creek is an eighteen-hole golf course in North Las Vegas, Nevada, USA, owned by MGM Resorts International.

== History ==
The course opened in 1989, was built on a 350-acre (140 ha) site, at a reported cost of 60 million dollars. Originally operated as Steve Wynn's private club, it later opened to a limited number of MGM hotel guests. Its $500 green fee made it one of the most expensive courses open to the general public.

In 2018, it hosted The Match: Tiger vs. Phil, a match play challenge between Tiger Woods and Phil Mickelson. It again hosted The Match in December 2024 for its PGA/LIV inter-tour competition between Rory McIlroy, Scottie Scheffler, Bryson Dechambeau and Brooks Koepka.

It hosted the PGA Tour's CJ Cup in October 2020, after the tournament was relocated from South Korea in response to the COVID-19 pandemic.

Since 2021, Shadow Creek has hosted the Bank of Hope LPGA Match-Play on the LPGA Tour.

== Golf course ==
The Tom Fazio designed golf course was built by Steve Wynn in 1990. It was originally 7,239-yard (6,619 m), extended to 7,560-yard (6,910 m) during a 2008 redesign, when a 7-acre (28,000 m^{2}) short game facility was added.
