= January 26 =

January 26 this year in various calendars
- Monday, 26 January 2026
| Akan | Kurudwo |
| Armenian | 10 Mehekani 1475 |
| Aztec | Toxcatl 16, 4 Cuetzpalin |
| Babylonian | 6 Tebetu, 2336 SE |
| Balinese pawukon | Luang, Pepet, Pasah, Menala, Pon, Paniron, Coma of Matal, Yama, Nohan, Pati |
| Bengali | 12 Magh, BS 1432 |
| Chinese | Yang Metal Rat・Net Mansion; Wood Snake Year, Month 12, Day 8 (Dahan, 9 days until Lichun) |
| Common Era | 26 January 2026 CE |
| Coptic | 18 Tobi, AM 1742 |
| Egyptian | 15 Payni, 2774 NE |
| Ethiopian | 18 Ṭer, 2018 Amätä Məhrät |
| French Republican | Décade I, Septidi de Pluviôse de l'Année 234 de la République |
| Gregorian | 26 January, AD 2026 |
| Hebrew | 8 Shevat, AM 5786 |
| Hindu | Aśvinī・Sādhya; Solar: 13 Māgha, 1947 SE; Lunisolar: Aṣṭamī, Śukla pakṣa of Māgha, 2082 VE; Siddhārthin・5126 KY・1,872,601 |
| Icelandic | Mánudagur, 4 Þorri 2025 |
| Islamic | 7 Sha'aban, AH 1447 (using tabular method) |
| ISO week date | 2026-W05-1 |
| Japanese | 8 Shiwasu, Reiwa 8 (Daikan, 9 days until Risshun) |
| Julian | 13 January, AD 2026 (AM 7534) |
| Julian day | 2461067 |
| Korean | 8 Sodal, 4358 DE |
| Maya | 13.0.13.5.4; 2 Pax, 4 Kan |
| Roman | Idibus Ianuariis, MMDCCLXXIX AUC |
| Solar Hijri | 6 Bahman, SH 1404 |
| Tibetan | 8 rgyal, shing mo sbrul 2152 or 1771 or 999 |

| << | January | | | | | >> |
| Su | Mo | Tu | We | Th | Fr | Sa |
| | | | | 1 | 2 | 3 |
| 4 | 5 | 6 | 7 | 8 | 9 | 10 |
| 11 | 12 | 13 | 14 | 15 | 16 | 17 |
| 18 | 19 | 20 | 21 | 22 | 23 | 24 |
| 25 | 26 | 27 | 28 | 29 | 30 | 31 |
2026

January 26 in recent years
2026 (Monday)
2025 (Sunday)
2024 (Friday)
2023 (Thursday)
2022 (Wednesday)
2021 (Tuesday)
2020 (Sunday)
2019 (Saturday)
2018 (Friday)
2017 (Thursday)

January 26 is the 26th day of the year in the Gregorian calendar; 339 days remain until the end of the year (340 in leap years).

== Events ==
=== Pre-1600 ===
- 661 – The Rashidun Caliphate is effectively ended with the assassination of Ali, the last caliph.
- 1531 – The 6.4–7.1 M_{w} Lisbon earthquake kills about thirty thousand people.
- 1564 – The Council of Trent establishes an official distinction between Roman Catholicism and Protestantism.
- 1564 – The Grand Duchy of Lithuania defeats the Tsardom of Russia in the Battle of Ula during the Livonian War.

=== 1601–1900 ===
- 1641 – Reapers' War: Battle of Montjuïc, decisive victory of the Catalan army (with French support) over the Spanish army.
- 1699 – For the first time, the Ottoman Empire permanently cedes territory to the Christian powers.
- 1700 – The 8.7–9.2 M_{w} Cascadia earthquake takes place off the west coast of North America, as evidenced by Japanese records.
- 1765 – A British naval expedition arrives at and names Port Egmont in the Falkland Islands, founding a settlement there eight days later. (Arrival was 15 January 1765 O.S.)
- 1788 – The British First Fleet, led by Arthur Phillip, sails into Port Jackson (Sydney Harbour) to establish Sydney, the first permanent European settlement on Australia. Commemorated as Australia Day.
- 1808 – The Rum Rebellion is the only successful (albeit short-lived) armed takeover of the government in New South Wales.
- 1837 – Michigan is admitted as the 26th U.S. state.
- 1841 – Gordon Bremer takes formal possession of Hong Kong Island at what is now Possession Point, establishing British Hong Kong.
- 1855 – Point No Point Treaty is signed in Washington Territory.
- 1856 – First Battle of Seattle: Marines from the USS Decatur drive off Native American attackers after all-day battle with settlers.
- 1861 – American Civil War: The state of Louisiana secedes from the Union.
- 1863 – American Civil War: General Ambrose Burnside is relieved of command of the Army of the Potomac after the disastrous Fredericksburg campaign. He is replaced by Joseph Hooker.
- 1863 – American Civil War: Governor of Massachusetts John Albion Andrew receives permission from the Secretary of War to raise a militia organization for men of African descent.
- 1870 – Reconstruction Era: Virginia is readmitted to the Union.
- 1885 – Troops loyal to The Mahdi conquer Khartoum, killing the Governor-General Charles George Gordon.

=== 1901–present ===
- 1905 – The world's largest diamond ever, the Cullinan, which weighs 3,106.75 carats (0.621350 kg), is found at the Premier Mine near Pretoria in South Africa.
- 1915 – The Rocky Mountain National Park is established by an act of the U.S. Congress.
- 1918 – Finnish Civil War: A group of Red Guards hangs a red lantern atop the tower of Helsinki Workers' Hall to symbolically mark the start of the war.
- 1926 – The first demonstration of the television by John Logie Baird.
- 1930 – The Indian National Congress declares 26 January as Independence Day or as the day for Poorna Swaraj ("Complete Independence") which occurred 17 years later.
- 1934 – The Apollo Theater reopens in Harlem, New York City.
- 1934 – German–Polish declaration of non-aggression is signed.
- 1939 – Spanish Civil War: Catalonia Offensive: Troops loyal to nationalist General Francisco Franco and aided by Italy take Barcelona.
- 1942 – World War II: The first United States forces arrive in Europe, landing in Northern Ireland.
- 1945 – World War II: Audie Murphy displays valor and bravery in action for which he will later be awarded the Medal of Honor.
- 1949 – The Hale Telescope at Palomar Observatory sees first light under the direction of Edwin Hubble, becoming the largest aperture optical telescope (until BTA-6 is built in 1976).
- 1950 – The Constitution of India comes into force, forming a republic. Rajendra Prasad is sworn in as the first President of India. Observed as Republic Day in India.
- 1952 – Black Saturday in Egypt: rioters burn Cairo's central business district, targeting British and upper-class Egyptian businesses.
- 1956 – Soviet Union cedes Porkkala back to Finland.
- 1959 – The 41-acre (17 ha) Chain Island is listed for sale by the California State Lands Commission, with a minimum bid of $5,226.
- 1962 – Ranger 3 is launched to study the Moon. The space probe later misses the Moon by 22,000 miles (35,400 km).
- 1966 – The three Beaumont children disappear from a beach in Glenelg, South Australia, resulting in one of the country's largest-ever police investigations.
- 1972 – JAT Flight 367 is destroyed by a terrorist bomb, killing 27 of the 28 people on board the DC-9. Flight attendant Vesna Vulović survives with critical injuries.
- 1974 – Turkish Airlines Flight 301 crashes during takeoff from Izmir Cumaovası Airport (now İzmir Adnan Menderes Airport), killing 66 of the 73 people on board the Fokker F28 Fellowship.
- 1986 – The Ugandan government of Tito Okello is overthrown by the National Resistance Army, led by Yoweri Museveni.
- 1991 – Mohamed Siad Barre is removed from power in Somalia, ending centralized government, and is succeeded by Ali Mahdi.
- 1998 – Lewinsky scandal: On American television, U.S. President Bill Clinton denies having had "sexual relations" with former White House intern Monica Lewinsky.
- 2001 – The 7.7 M_{w} Gujarat earthquake shakes Western India, leaving 13,805–20,023 dead and about 166,800 injured.
- 2001 – Diane Whipple, a lacrosse coach, is killed in a dog attack in San Francisco. The resulting court case clarified the meaning of implied malice murder.
- 2009 – Rioting breaks out in Antananarivo, Madagascar, sparking a political crisis that will result in the replacement of President Marc Ravalomanana with Andry Rajoelina.
- 2009 – Nadya Suleman gives birth to the world's first surviving octuplets.
- 2015 – An aircraft crashes at Los Llanos Air Base in Albacete, Spain, killing 11 people and injuring 21 others.
- 2015 – Syrian civil war: The People's Protection Units (YPG) recaptures the city of Kobanî from the Islamic State of Iraq and the Levant (ISIL), marking a turning point in the Siege of Kobanî.
- 2020 – A Sikorsky S-76B flying from John Wayne Airport to Camarillo Airport crashes in Calabasas, 30 miles west of Los Angeles, killing all nine people on board, including five-time NBA champion Kobe Bryant and his daughter Gianna Bryant.
- 2021 – Protesters and farmers storm the Red Fort near Delhi, clashing with police. One protester is killed and more than 80 police officers are injured.

== Births ==
=== Pre-1600 ===
- 183 – Lady Zhen, wife of Cao Pi (died 221)
- 1541 – Florent Chrestien, French poet and translator (died 1596)
- 1549 – Jakob Ebert, German theologian (died 1614)
- 1582 – Giovanni Lanfranco, Italian painter (died 1647)

=== 1601–1900 ===
- 1657 – William Wake, Archbishop of Canterbury (died 1737)
- 1714 – Jean-Baptiste Pigalle, French sculptor and educator (died 1785)
- 1715 – Claude Adrien Helvétius, French philosopher (died 1771)
- 1716 – George Germain, 1st Viscount Sackville, English general and politician, Secretary of State for the Colonies (died 1785)
- 1722 – Alexander Carlyle, Scottish minister and author (died 1805)
- 1763 – Charles XIV John of Sweden (died 1844)
- 1781 – Ludwig Achim von Arnim, German poet and author (died 1831)
- 1813 – Juan Pablo Duarte, Dominican philosopher and poet, founding father of the Dominican Republic (died 1876)
- 1824 – Emil Czyrniański, Polish chemist (died 1888)
- 1832 – George Shiras Jr., American lawyer and Supreme Court justice (died 1924)
- 1842 – François Coppée, French poet and author (died 1908)
- 1852 – Pierre Savorgnan de Brazza, Italian-French explorer (died 1905)
- 1861 – Louis Anquetin, French painter (died 1932)
- 1863 – Charles Wade, Australian politician, 17th Premier of New South Wales (died 1922)
- 1864 – József Pusztai, Slovene-Hungarian poet and journalist (died 1934)
- 1866 – John Cady, American golfer (died 1933)
- 1877 – Kees van Dongen, Dutch painter (died 1968)
- 1880 – Douglas MacArthur, American general, Medal of Honor recipient (died 1964)
- 1885 – Harry Ricardo, English engineer and academic (died 1974)
- 1885 – Per Thorén, Swedish figure skater (died 1962)
- 1887 – François Faber, French-Luxembourgish cyclist (died 1915)
- 1887 – Marc Mitscher, American admiral and pilot (died 1947)
- 1891 – Frank Costello, Italian-American mob boss (died 1973)
- 1891 – August Froehlich, German priest and martyr (died 1942)
- 1891 – Wilder Penfield, American-Canadian neurosurgeon and academic (died 1976)
- 1892 – Bessie Coleman, American pilot (died 1926)
- 1893 – Giuseppe Genco Russo, Italian mob boss (died 1976)
- 1899 – Günther Reindorff, Russian-Estonian graphic designer and illustrator (died 1974)
- 1900 – Karl Ristenpart, German conductor (died 1967)

=== 1901–present ===
- 1902 – Menno ter Braak, Dutch author (died 1940)
- 1904 – Ancel Keys, American physiologist and nutritionist (died 2004)
- 1904 – Seán MacBride, Irish lawyer and politician, Irish Minister for External Affairs Nobel Prize laureate (died 1988)
- 1905 – Charles Lane, American actor and singer (died 2007)
- 1905 – Maria von Trapp, Austrian-American singer (died 1987)
- 1907 – Rex Connor, Australian politician (died 1977)
- 1907 – Dimitrios Holevas, Greek priest and philologist (died 2001)
- 1908 – Jill Esmond, English actress (died 1990)
- 1908 – Rupprecht Geiger, German painter and sculptor (died 2009)
- 1908 – Stéphane Grappelli, French violinist (died 1997)
- 1908 – Robert Halperin, American yachtsman (died 1985)
- 1910 – Jean Image, Hungarian-French animator, director, and screenwriter (died 1989)
- 1911 – Polykarp Kusch, German-American physicist and academic, Nobel Prize laureate (died 1993)
- 1911 – Norbert Schultze, German composer and conductor (died 2002)
- 1913 – Jimmy Van Heusen, American pianist and composer (died 1990)
- 1914 – Dürrüşehvar Sultan, Imperial Princess of the Ottoman Empire (died 2006)
- 1915 – William Hopper, American actor (died 1970)
- 1917 – Louis Zamperini, American runner and captain (died 2014)
- 1918 – Philip José Farmer, American author (died 2009)
- 1919 – Valentino Mazzola, Italian footballer (died 1949)
- 1919 – Bill Nicholson, English footballer and manager (died 2004)
- 1919 – Hyun Soong-jong, South Korean politician, 24th Prime Minister of South Korea (died 2020)
- 1920 – Hans Holzer, Austrian-American paranormal researcher and author (died 2009)
- 1921 – Eddie Barclay, French record producer, founded Barclay Records (died 2005)
- 1921 – Akio Morita, Japanese businessman, co-founded Sony (died 1999)
- 1921 – Veikko Uusimäki, Finnish actor and theater councilor (died 2008)
- 1922 – Michael Bentine, English actor and screenwriter (died 1996)
- 1922 – Seán Flanagan, Irish footballer and politician, 7th Irish Minister for Health (died 1993)
- 1922 – Gil Merrick, English footballer (died 2010)
- 1923 – Patrick J. Hannifin, American admiral (died 2014)
- 1923 – Anne Jeffreys, American actress and singer (died 2017)
- 1924 – Alice Babs, Swedish singer and actress (died 2014)
- 1924 – Anahid Ajemian, American violinist (died 2016)
- 1924 – Annette Strauss, American philanthropist and politician, Mayor of Dallas (died 1998)
- 1925 – David Jenkins, English bishop and theologian (died 2016)
- 1925 – Joan Leslie, American actress (died 2015)
- 1925 – Paul Newman, American actor, activist, director, race car driver, and businessman, co-founded Newman's Own (died 2008)
- 1925 – Ben Pucci, American football player and sportscaster (died 2013)
- 1925 – Claude Ryan, Canadian journalist and politician (died 2004)
- 1926 – Farman Fatehpuri, Pakistani linguist and scholar (died 2013)
- 1926 – Joseph Bacon Fraser Jr., American architect and businessman, co-founded the Sea Pines Company (died 2014)
- 1927 – José Azcona del Hoyo, Honduran businessman and politician, President of Honduras (died 2005)
- 1927 – Bob Nieman, American baseball player and scout (died 1985)
- 1927 – Hubert Schieth, German footballer and manager (died 2013)
- 1928 – Roger Vadim, French actor and director (died 2000)
- 1929 – Jules Feiffer, American cartoonist, playwright, screenwriter, and educator (died 2025)
- 1933 – Donald Sarason, American mathematician (died 2017)
- 1934 – Roger Landry, Canadian businessman and publisher (died 2020)
- 1934 – Charles Marowitz, American director, playwright, and critic (died 2014)
- 1934 – Huey "Piano" Smith, American pianist and songwriter (died 2023)
- 1934 – Bob Uecker, American baseball player, sportscaster and actor (died 2025)
- 1934 – Oldo Hlaváček, Slovak actor and screenwriter (died 2025)
- 1935 – Corrado Augias, Italian journalist and politician
- 1935 – Henry Jordan, American football player (died 1977)
- 1935 – Paula Rego, Portuguese-born British visual artist (died 2022)
- 1936 – Sal Buscema, American comics artist (died 2026)
- 1937 – Joseph Saidu Momoh, Sierra Leonean soldier and politician, 2nd President of Sierra Leone (died 2003)
- 1938 – Henry Jaglom, English-American director and screenwriter (died 2025)
- 1940 – Séamus Hegarty, Irish bishop (died 2019)
- 1940 – Frank Large, English footballer and cricketer (died 2003)
- 1943 – César Gutiérrez, Venezuelan baseball player and manager (died 2005)
- 1943 – Jack Warner, Trinidadian businessman and politician
- 1944 – Angela Davis, American activist, academic, and author
- 1944 – Jerry Sandusky, American football coach and criminal
- 1945 – Jacqueline du Pré, English cellist (died 1987)
- 1945 – David Purley, English race car driver (died 1985)
- 1946 – Susan Friedlander, American mathematician
- 1946 – Christopher Hampton, Portuguese-English director, screenwriter, and playwright
- 1946 – Gene Siskel, American journalist and film critic (died 1999)
- 1947 – Patrick Dewaere, French actor and composer (died 1982)
- 1947 – Les Ebdon, English chemist and academic
- 1947 – Redmond Morris, 4th Baron Killanin, Irish director, producer, and production manager
- 1947 – Richard Portnow, American actor
- 1947 – Michel Sardou, French singer-songwriter and actor
- 1948 – Alda Facio, Costa Rican jurist, writer and teacher
- 1948 – Corky Laing, Canadian rock drummer
- 1948 – Jennifer von Mayrhauser, American theater, television and film costume designer
- 1949 – Jonathan Carroll, American author
- 1949 – David Strathairn, American actor
- 1950 – Jörg Haider, Austrian lawyer and politician, Governor of Carinthia (died 2008)
- 1950 – Ivan Hlinka, Czech ice hockey player and coach (died 2004)
- 1950 – Jack Youngblood, American football player
- 1951 – David Briggs, Australian guitarist, songwriter, and producer
- 1951 – Andy Hummel, American singer-songwriter and bass player (died 2010)
- 1951 – Anne Mills, English economist and academic
- 1952 – Tom Henderson, American basketball player
- 1953 – Alik L. Alik, Micronesian politician, 7th Vice President of the Federated States of Micronesia
- 1953 – Anders Fogh Rasmussen, Danish politician and diplomat, 39th Prime Minister of Denmark
- 1953 – Lucinda Williams, American singer-songwriter and guitarist
- 1954 – Kim Hughes, Australian cricketer
- 1955 – Eddie Van Halen, Dutch-American guitarist, songwriter, and producer (died 2020)
- 1957 – Road Warrior Hawk, American wrestler (died 2003)
- 1958 – Anita Baker, American singer-songwriter
- 1958 – Ellen DeGeneres, American comedian, actress, and talk show host
- 1960 – Charlie Gillingham, American musician
- 1961 – Wayne Gretzky, Canadian ice hockey player and coach
- 1961 – Tom Keifer, American singer-songwriter and guitarist
- 1962 – Guo Jian, Chinese-Australian painter, sculptor, and photographer
- 1962 – Tim May, Australian cricketer
- 1962 – Oscar Ruggeri, Argentine footballer and manager
- 1963 – Jazzie B, British DJ and music producer
- 1963 – José Mourinho, Portuguese footballer and manager
- 1963 – Simon O'Donnell, Australian footballer, cricketer, and sportscaster
- 1963 – Tony Parks, English footballer and manager
- 1963 – Andrew Ridgeley, English singer-songwriter and guitarist
- 1964 – Adam Crozier, Scottish businessman
- 1964 – Paul Johansson, American-Canadian actor
- 1965 – Kevin McCarthy, American politician, 55th Speaker of the United States House of Representatives
- 1965 – Thomas Östros, Swedish businessman and politician
- 1965 – Natalia Yurchenko, Russian gymnast and coach
- 1966 – Kazushige Nagashima, Japanese baseball player and sportscaster
- 1967 – Bryan Callen, American comedian, actor, and writer
- 1967 – Anatoly Komm, Russian chef and businessman
- 1967 – Col Needham, English businessman, co-founded Internet Movie Database
- 1968 – Jupiter Apple, Brazilian singer-songwriter, film director, and actor (died 2015)
- 1969 – George Dikeoulakos, Greek-Romanian basketball player and coach
- 1970 – Kirk Franklin, American singer-songwriter and producer
- 1972 – Nate Mooney, American actor
- 1973 – Jennifer Crystal Foley, American actress
- 1973 – Larissa Lowing, Canadian artistic gymnast
- 1973 – Melvil Poupaud, French actor, director, and screenwriter
- 1973 – Brendan Rodgers, Northern Irish footballer and manager
- 1973 – Mayu Shinjo, Japanese author and illustrator
- 1976 – Gilles Marini, French actor
- 1977 – Vince Carter, American basketball player
- 1977 – Justin Gimelstob, American tennis player and coach
- 1978 – Esteban Germán, Dominican baseball player
- 1978 – Corina Morariu, American tennis player and sportscaster
- 1978 – Andrés Torres, American baseball player
- 1979 – Sara Rue, American actress
- 1981 – José de Jesús Corona, Mexican footballer
- 1981 – Gustavo Dudamel, Venezuelan violinist, composer, and conductor
- 1981 – Juan José Haedo, Argentine cyclist
- 1981 – Colin O'Donoghue, Irish actor
- 1983 – Petri Oravainen, Finnish footballer
- 1983 – Eric Werner, American ice hockey player
- 1984 – Ryan Hoffman, Australian rugby league player
- 1984 – Iain Turner, Scottish footballer
- 1984 – Luo Xuejuan, Chinese swimmer
- 1985 – Heather Stanning, English rower
- 1986 – Kizzmekia Corbett, American immunologist
- 1986 – Gerald Green, American basketball player
- 1986 – Kim Jae-joong, South Korean singer, songwriter, actor, and director
- 1986 – Mustapha Yatabaré, French-Malian footballer
- 1987 – Sebastian Giovinco, Italian footballer
- 1987 – Héctor Noesí, Dominican baseball player
- 1988 – Dan Bailey, American football player
- 1988 – Dimitrios Chondrokoukis, Greek high jumper
- 1989 – MarShon Brooks, American basketball player
- 1989 – Emily Hughes, American figure skater
- 1989 – Torrey Smith, American football player
- 1990 – Brandon Bolden, American football player
- 1990 – Sergio Pérez, Mexican race car driver
- 1990 – Peter Sagan, Slovak professional cyclist
- 1991 – Esteban Andrada, Argentine footballer
- 1991 – Nicolò Melli, Italian-American basketball player
- 1991 – Alex Sandro, Brazilian footballer
- 1991 – Manti Te'o, American football player
- 1992 – Mercedes Moné, American wrestler
- 1993 – Miguel Borja, Colombian footballer
- 1993 – Lana Clelland, Scottish footballer
- 1993 – Kevin Pangos, Canadian-Slovenian basketball player
- 1993 – Alice Powell, British racing driver
- 1993 – Florian Thauvin, French footballer
- 1994 – Montrezl Harrell, American basketball player
- 1995 – Jean-Charles Castelletto, Cameroonian footballer
- 1995 – Sione Katoa, New Zealand rugby league player
- 1996 – Zakaria Bakkali, Belgian footballer
- 1996 – Hwang Hee-chan, South Korean football player
- 1997 – Gedion Zelalem, German-born American soccer player
- 1998 – Moonbin, South Korean singer and actor. (died 2023)
- 1999 – Leonardo Balerdi, Argentine footballer
- 1999 – Travis Etienne, American football player
- 2000 – Ester Expósito, Spanish actress
- 2000 – Darius Garland, American basketball player
- 2001 – Latalia Bevan, Welsh artistic gymnast
- 2001 – Isaac Okoro, American basketball player
- 2002 – Darya Astakhova, Russian tennis player
- 2009 – YaYa Gosselin, American actress
- 2009 – The Suleman octuplets

== Deaths ==
=== Pre-1600 ===
- 738 – John of Dailam, Syrian monk and saint (born 660)
- 1390 – Adolph IX, Count of Holstein-Kiel (born c. 1327)
- 1567 – Nicholas Wotton, English courtier and diplomat (born 1497)

=== 1601–1900 ===
- 1620 – Amar Singh I, ruler of Mewar (born 1559)
- 1630 – Henry Briggs, English mathematician and astronomer (born 1556)
- 1641 – Lawrence Hyde, English lawyer (born 1562)
- 1697 – Georg Mohr, Danish mathematician and theorist (born 1640)
- 1744 – Ludwig Andreas von Khevenhüller, Austrian field marshal (born 1683)
- 1750 – Albert Schultens, Dutch philologist and academic (born 1686)
- 1795 – Johann Christoph Friedrich Bach, German harpsichord player and composer (born 1732)
- 1799 – Gabriel Christie, Scottish general (born 1722)
- 1814 – Manuel do Cenáculo, Portuguese prelate and antiquarian (born 1724)
- 1823 – Edward Jenner, English physician and immunologist, creator of the smallpox vaccine (born 1749)
- 1824 – Théodore Géricault, French painter and lithographer (born 1791)
- 1830 – Filippo Castagna, Maltese politician (born 1765)
- 1849 – Thomas Lovell Beddoes, English poet, playwright, and physician (born 1803)
- 1855 – Gérard de Nerval, French poet and translator (born 1808)
- 1860 – Wilhelmine Schröder-Devrient, opera singer (born 1804)
- 1869 – Duncan Gordon Boyes, English soldier; Victoria Cross recipient (born 1846)
- 1885 – Edward Davy, English-Australian physician and engineer (born 1806)
- 1885 – Charles George Gordon, English general and politician (born 1833)
- 1886 – David Rice Atchison, American general and politician (born 1807)
- 1887 – Anandi Gopal Joshi, one of the first female Indian physicians (born 1865)
- 1891 – Nicolaus Otto, German engineer, invented the internal combustion engine (born 1833)
- 1893 – Abner Doubleday, American general (born 1819)
- 1895 – Arthur Cayley, English mathematician and academic (born 1825)
- 1896 – James Edwin Campbell, American educator, school administrator, newspaper editor, poet, and essayist (born 1867)

=== 1901–present ===
- 1904 – Whitaker Wright, English businessman (born 1846)
- 1920 – Jeanne Hébuterne, French painter and author (born 1898)
- 1932 – William Wrigley Jr., American businessman, founded the Wrigley Company (born 1861)
- 1943 – Harry H. Laughlin, American sociologist and eugenicist (born 1880)
- 1943 – Nikolai Vavilov, Russian botanist and geneticist (born 1887)
- 1946 – Adriaan van Maanen, Dutch-American astronomer and academic (born 1884)
- 1947 – Grace Moore, American soprano and actress (born 1898)
- 1948 – Fred Conrad Koch, American biochemist and endocrinologist (born 1876)
- 1953 – Athanase David, Canadian lawyer and politician (born 1882)
- 1962 – Lucky Luciano, Italian-American mob boss (born 1897)
- 1968 – Merrill C. Meigs, American publisher (born 1883)
- 1973 – Edward G. Robinson, Romanian-American actor (born 1893)
- 1976 – João Branco Núncio, Portuguese bullfighter (born 1901)
- 1977 – Dietrich von Hildebrand, German Catholic philosopher and author (born 1889)
- 1979 – Nelson Rockefeller, American businessman and politician, 41st Vice President of the United States (born 1908)
- 1983 – Bear Bryant, American football player and coach (born 1913)
- 1985 – Kenny Clarke, American jazz drummer and bandleader (born 1914)
- 1986 – Ruben Nirvi, Finnish linguist and professor (born 1905)
- 1990 – Lewis Mumford, American sociologist and historian (born 1895)
- 1992 – José Ferrer, Puerto Rican-American actor (born 1912)
- 1993 – Jan Gies, Dutch businessman and humanitarian (born 1905)
- 1993 – Jeanne Sauvé, Canadian journalist and politician, Governor General of Canada (born 1922)
- 1996 – Harold Brodkey, American author and academic (born 1930)
- 1996 – Frank Howard, American football player and coach (born 1909)
- 1996 – Henry Lewis, American bassist and conductor (born 1932)
- 1997 – Jeane Dixon, American astrologer and psychic (born 1904)
- 2000 – Don Budge, American tennis player and coach (born 1915)
- 2000 – Kathleen Hale, English author and illustrator (born 1898)
- 2000 – A. E. van Vogt, Canadian-American author (born 1912)
- 2001 – Al McGuire, American basketball player and coach (born 1928)
- 2003 – Valeriy Brumel, Russian high jumper (born 1942)
- 2003 – Hugh Trevor-Roper, English historian and academic (born 1917)
- 2003 – George Younger, 4th Viscount Younger of Leckie, Scottish banker and politician, Secretary of State for Scotland (born 1931)
- 2004 – Fred Haas, American golfer (born 1916)
- 2006 – Khan Abdul Wali Khan, Pakistani politician (born 1917)
- 2007 – Gump Worsley, Canadian ice hockey player (born 1929)
- 2008 – Viktor Schreckengost, American sculptor and designer (born 1906)
- 2008 – George Habash, Palestinian politician, founder of the PFLP (born 1926)
- 2010 – Louis Auchincloss, American novelist and essayist (born 1917)
- 2011 – David Kato Kisule, Ugandan teacher and LGBT rights activist, considered a father of Uganda's gay rights movement (born 1964)
- 2011 – Charlie Louvin, American singer-songwriter and guitarist (born 1927)
- 2012 – Roberto Mieres, Argentinian race car driver (born 1924)
- 2013 – Christine M. Jones, American educator and politician (born 1929)
- 2013 – Stefan Kudelski, Polish-Swiss engineer, inventor of the Nagra (born 1929)
- 2013 – Padma Kant Shukla, Indian physicist and academic (born 1950)
- 2013 – Shōtarō Yasuoka, Japanese author (born 1920)
- 2014 – Tom Gola, American basketball player, coach, and politician (born 1933)
- 2014 – Paula Gruden, Slovenian-Australian poet and translator (born 1921)
- 2014 – José Emilio Pacheco, Mexican poet and author (born 1939)
- 2015 – Cleven "Goodie" Goudeau, American art director and cartoonist (born 1932)
- 2015 – Tom Uren, Australian politician (born 1921)
- 2016 – Sahabzada Yaqub Khan, Pakistani military leader, foreign minister, and diplomat (born 1920)
- 2016 – Abe Vigoda, American actor (born 1921)
- 2017 – Mike Connors, American actor (born 1925)
- 2017 – Tam Dalyell, Scottish politician (born 1932)
- 2017 – Lindy Delapenha, Jamaican footballer and sports journalist (born 1927)
- 2017 – Barbara Hale, American actress (born 1922)
- 2017 – Barbara Howard, Canadian sprinter and educator (born 1920)
- 2020 – John Altobelli, American college baseball coach (born 1963)
- 2020 – Gianna Bryant, American student-athlete (born 2006)
- 2020 – Kobe Bryant, American basketball player (born 1978)
- 2025 – Suzanne Massie, American historian (born 1931)

== Holidays and observances ==
- Christian feast day:
  - Saint Alberic of Cîteaux
  - Blessed Gabriele Allegra
  - Saint Paula of Rome
  - Saint Timothy
  - Saint Titus
  - January 26 (Eastern Orthodox liturgics)
- Australia Day (Australia)
- Republic Day (India)
