= Joseph Fraser =

Joe or Joseph Fraser may refer to:

- Joseph Bacon Fraser (1895–1971), American general who served in World War I, World War II and Korean War
- Joseph Bacon Fraser Jr. (1926–2014), American homebuilder and philanthropist, son of above
- Joe Fraser (born 1998), English artistic gymnast, competitor in 2020 Summer Olympics

== See also ==
- Joseph Fraser Mooney (1927–2006), Canadian legislator in Nova Scotia
- Jo Fraser (born 1986), Scottish painter specialising in portraiture
