= Sea Pines Company =

Real estate development group

The Sea Pines Company
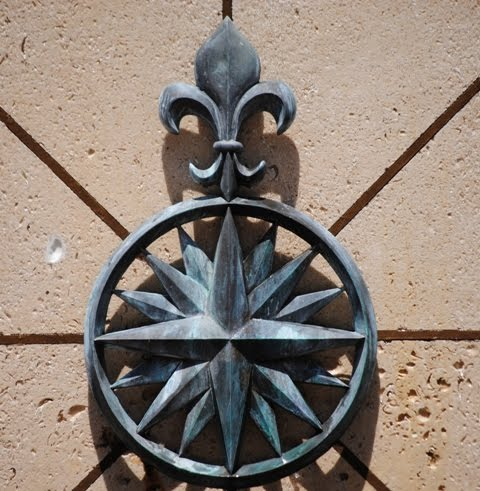
- Company type: Private
- Industry: Real estate development
- Founded: June 20, 1957
- Founder: General Joseph Bacon Fraser, Charles E. Fraser, Joseph B Fraser Jr.
- Defunct: 1986
- Fate: Involuntary Bankruptcy
- Successor: Sea Pines Association
- Headquarters: Hilton Head Island, South Carolina, U.S.

The Sea Pines Company was a real estate development group founded by General Joseph Bacon Fraser, Charles E. Fraser, and Joseph B. Fraser Jr. In 1956. It developed Sea Pines Plantation, Amelia Island Plantation, Brandermill (Virginia), Kiawah Island, Palmas Del Mar (Puerto Rico), Hilton Head Plantation, Wintergreen Resort and more. It was successful in the 1960s but hit hard by 1972-1974 recession. It was sold in 1983.

== History ==
=== 1955–1968 Early Years ===
In 1955, at age 26, Charles drafts a land-use plan for a low-density development on timberland at the southern end of Hilton Head Island on which his family held an interest. The following year, Charles E. Fraser, bought his father's interest in The Hilton Head Company and began developing it into Sea Pines Plantation.

- 1957: first lots in Sea Pines Plantation are sold.
- 1959: William Hilton Inn, a 56-room hotel on present-day site of Marriott's Grande Ocean Resort, is opened.
- 1960: The Ocean Course in Sea Pines is built, the first golf course on Hilton Head.
- 1967-69: Harbour Town, with its signature red-and-white striped lighthouse, is built.
- 1968: Harbour Town Golf Links, designed by Jack Nicklaus and Pete Dye, is built.

=== 1969–1973 Boom ===
- 1969: Sea Pines Company develops Wintergreen Resort in the Blue Ridge Mountains of Virginia.
- 1970: Sea Pines Company buys Lewith Group and begins development of River Hills Plantation in Lake Wylie, SC. River Hills Plantation
- 1970: Sea Pines buys 2,400 acres of an old coconut plantation with 6 miles of beach on the southeastern coast of Puerto Rico to begin planning Palmas Del Mar. The company paid $8.5 Million.
- 1970: Acquired land on Amelia Island, Florida south of Fernandina Beach and began development of Amelia Island Plantation.
- 1971: Sea Pines Company sells Cumberland Island holdings to the National Park Foundation, followed by the creation of the Cumberland Island National Seashore.
- 1971: With the sale of the Hilton Head Company, Sea Pines Company acquires land on the north end of the island for the development of Hilton Head Plantation.
- 1972: Sea Pines unveils plan for development of 1,600 acres of land in its natural state into the Isle of Palms Beach and Racquet Club (now Wild Dunes).
- 1972: The Sea Pines Company buys 90% of a partnership created 2 years prior between Chesterfield Land and Timber Company and Reynolds, Smith, and Hills, and architectural firm from Jackson, Fl to develop a community in Chesterfield County called Swift Creek.
- 1972: The Amelia Island Plantation master plan is unveiled.
- 1973: Charles Fraser and Sea Pines hire 11 MBA graduates from Harvard University. He is written up in Time Magazine for the feat.

=== 1974–1987 Recession ===
- 1973: Stock Market begins 2 year bear Market due to oil embargoes, the Nixon Scandal and more. This would be the height of the Sea Pines Company.
- 1974: The Kiawah Island Company Ltd. bought the 4000 acre Kiawah Island from the C. C. Royal family. Sea Pines enters into a contract with the Kiawah Island Company to undertake and supervise the planning and developing the Island into a luxury resort. The services to be performed for the development of the island were basically the same kind of services performed by a landscape architect in preparing a site plan, or an architect in designing a building. Sea Pines was to supply a trained staff to Kiawah. It was to furnish plans and supervision of construction.
- 1974: Sea Pines Company Operating responsibilities turned over from Charles Fraser to 31-year-old president James L. Wright in attempt to keep lenders at bay and fend off bankruptcy.
- 1974: Sports Illustrated shoots the swimsuit edition featuring Ann Simonton at Palmas Del Mar.
- 1975: Palmas Del Mar is written off at a cost of $13 Milltion to Sea Pines due to inflated labor costs, the burden of providing utilities and roads. As Fraser ruefully acknowledges, "we slowly discovered" that Puerto Rico was "a bottomless pit of intractable problems for the community builder."
- 1975: Sea Pines Company loses control of Hilton Head Plantation to Citibank of New York and First Chicago Bank. River Hills Plantation is sold to homeowners' investment group.
- 1976: Amelia Island Plantation bankrupt, Sold to Richard Cooper Investments.
- 1976: The Brandermill Group, including one of Charles E. Frasers Proteges, Harry Frampton, buys out Sea Pines Interest in Swift Creek and renames the plantation Brandermill.
- 1976: Wintergreen Resort sold to Melba Investors.
- 1976-1977: Sea Pines is sued by and countersues the Kuwait Investment Company. The final out of court settlement called for Sea Pines to receive $500,000 and all Sea Pines management contracts for Kiawah Island Plantation severed.
- 1977: Brandermill named “The Best Planned Community in America” by Better Homes and Gardens and the National Association of Home Builders.
- 1983: Charles E. Fraser steps down as chairman of Sea Pines Company.
- 1986: Sea Pines declared involuntary bankruptcy.
