= West Fraser =

American painter

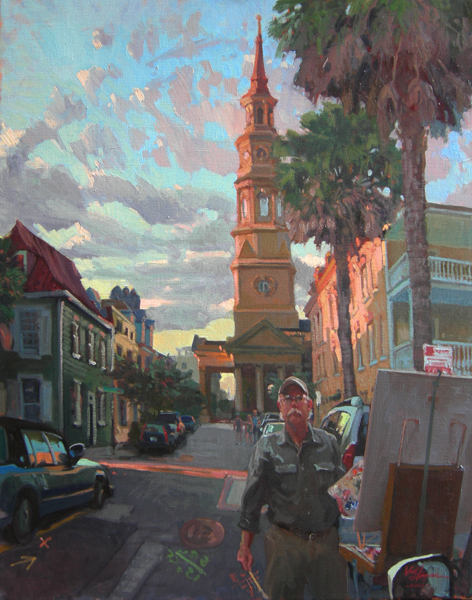
- Self portrait of Fraser
- Born: James West Fraser; 1955 (age 70–71); Georgia, US
- Education: University of Georgia
- Notable work: Before the World Was Made; 126 Oak Street, McClellanville; Bluffton Oyster Factory Shuckers
- Style: plein air
- Children: 3
- Father: Joseph Bacon Fraser Jr.
- Relatives: Joseph Bacon Fraser (grandfather); Charles E. Fraser (uncle)
- Awards: John Young Hunter Award (1994); Mystic International Award of Excellence; Mary S. Litt Award; Hubbard Museum of Art - Pursuit of Excellence/American Master; Edgar Payne Gold Medal Award
- Website: https://westfraserstudio.com/

James West Fraser (born 1955) is an American artist known for his representational En Plein Air paintings. His work frequently depicts vistas of cities, coasts, and landscapes.

== Early life and career ==
West Fraser was born in Georgia to Joseph Bacon Fraser Jr. and Carolyn Bexley. He attended the Savannah Country Day School, and was raised in nearby Hinesville until 1964, when his family moved to Hilton Head Island, South Carolina. He graduated from the University of Georgia with a Bachelor of Fine Arts in 1979. The following year, he worked independently as an illustrator in Savannah, and began his first serious painting in watercolors. In the early 1980s he lived in Buck's County, Pennsylvania, and began traveling up and down the New England coast to paint maritime subjects and harbor scenes. After several years, he returned south to settle in Charleston, South Carolina, and continued his work in watercolor through the late 1980s. The realistic, detailed marine compositions from this period resulted in early critical recognition, with a 1984 solo show at the Grand Central Art Galleries in New York City, and his first solo exhibition at the Gibbes Museum of Art in Charleston in 1986 through early 1987.

== Artistry ==
West Fraser is known for his oil paintings, particularly his en plein air style, which emphasizes the depiction of light, color, and atmosphere in landscapes, cityscapes, and marine scenes. Prior to 1986, he had developed a looser watercolor style. Beginning in 1989, he focused on this style, exploring subjects ranging from urban views to natural landscapes. In 1990, Fraser shifted to representational en plein air painting in oil, specializing in coastal landscapes, streetscapes and travel paintings.

Fraser's work has been featured in publications such as Art & Antiques, The Robb Report, Southern Accents, American Artist, Nautical Quarterly, Southwest Art, Hemispheres, and The Bluff Magazine. In 2000, he represented South Carolina in the bicentennial celebration calendar published by the White House Historical Association. In 2001, the University of South Carolina Press published the monograph Charleston in My Time: The Paintings of West Fraser. In 2006, Fraser painted the official portrait of South Carolina Governor Mark Sanford.

== Philanthropy ==
=== Daniel West Fraser Scholarship Fund ===
Fraser, along with family and friends, established the Daniel West Fraser Scholarship Fund through the Gibbes Museum of Art to commemorate his eldest son Daniel. The fund provides scholarship funding for art camps and classes to talented students from local schools, recommended by their teachers.

=== Joseph Bacon and Carolyn Bexley Fraser Sustainable Seafood Harvest Fund ===
West Fraser partnered with the Community Foundation of the Lowcountry to establish a fund for conservation, research, and support for sustainable seafood harvests around Beaufort County. The Joseph Bacon and Carolyn Bexley Fraser Sustainable Seafood Harvest Fund, named for Fraser's parents, funds conservation programs focused on maintaining the ecosystems and estuaries of the Port Royal Basin, the Calibogue Sound Basin, and surrounding areas, to ensure sustainable seafood harvests continue into the future.“ Proceeds from prints of Bluffton Oyster Factory Shuckers go towards the fund.

== Honors and awards ==
Fraser was a Commissioner of the South Carolina Art's Commission from 2003 to 2012, he is an elected member of the Salmagundi Club, an elected Fellow of the American Society of Marine Artists, a Signature member of Plein Air Painters of America (PAPA), and a member of the California Art Club.

In 1984, he received the John Young Hunter Award from the Allied Artists of America. Since then he has been honored with the Award of Excellence from Mystic International, The Mary S. Litt Award from the American Watercolor Society, the Pursuit of Excellence/American Master award from the Hubbard Museum of Art, and the Edgar Payne Gold Medal Award for Best Landscape from the California Art Club's 100th Juries Gold Medal Exhibition, among others.

Fraser's works are part of permanent collections in nine museums across the United States and Bermuda, and at the White House Historical Association.

=== Permanent museum collections ===
- Gibbs Museum of Art
- Greenville County Museum of Art
- Laguna Art Museum
- Masterworks Museum Collection, Hamilton, Bermuda
- Midway Museum, Midway, GA
- Mission San Juan Capistrano
- Morris Museum of Art
- Springfield Museum of Art, Springfield, OH
- Telfair Museum of Art
- White House Historical Association

== Publications ==
- Fraser, West; McNeil, Courtney (2012). A Native Son, Paintings by West Fraser (Exhibition catalog). Savannah, Georgia: Telfair Museum. p. 47. ISBN 9780933075184.
- Bostick, Douglas W.; Davidson, Jason R.; Stoney, Richard S. W. (introduction); Young, Stewart (photographs); Fraser, West (featured paintings) (June 2006). The Boathouse: Tales and Recipes from a Southern Kitchen. Joggling Board Press. ISBN 9780975349892.
- Sokolitz, Roberta (introductory essay) (2002). Charleston In My Time: the Paintings of West Fraser (exhibition catalog). Charleston Renaissance Gallery. OCLC 222479255.
- Permar, Mark (photography); Erikson, Jim (photography); Fraser, West (paintings); Horan, Eric (photography) (2002). Where is Palmetto Bluff?. OCLC 244206269.
- Clements, Emily; Fraser, West (paintings) (January–February 2002). "Daws Island: Rich in History, Rich in Art". South Carolina Wildlife.
- Fraser, West; Phillips, Ted (introductory essay); Mack, Angela D. (introductory essay) (2001). Charleston In My Time: the Paintings of West Fraser. Columbia, SC: University of South Carolina Press. ISBN 1-57003-392-7.
- Fraser, West (1995). The Color of Light: Paintings by West Fraser, 1983 through 1995 (exhibition catalog). Springfield Museum of Art Museum. OCLC 34153235.
- Montvidas-Kutkus, Kristina (1994). In the Dinghy (exhibition catalog). Gibbes Museum of Art. OCLC 84526134.
- The Second Annual Hubbard Art Award for Excellence (exhibition catalog). The Hubbard Museum. 1991. OCLC 24867776.
- Wamsley, James S.; Fraser, West (paintings) (Spring 1985). "Fine and Fragile Islands–Hilton Head, Daufuskie, Kiawah". Islands.
