= Seine River Crossing at Mantes-Gassicourt =

- Part of Operation Overlord, Battle of Normandy
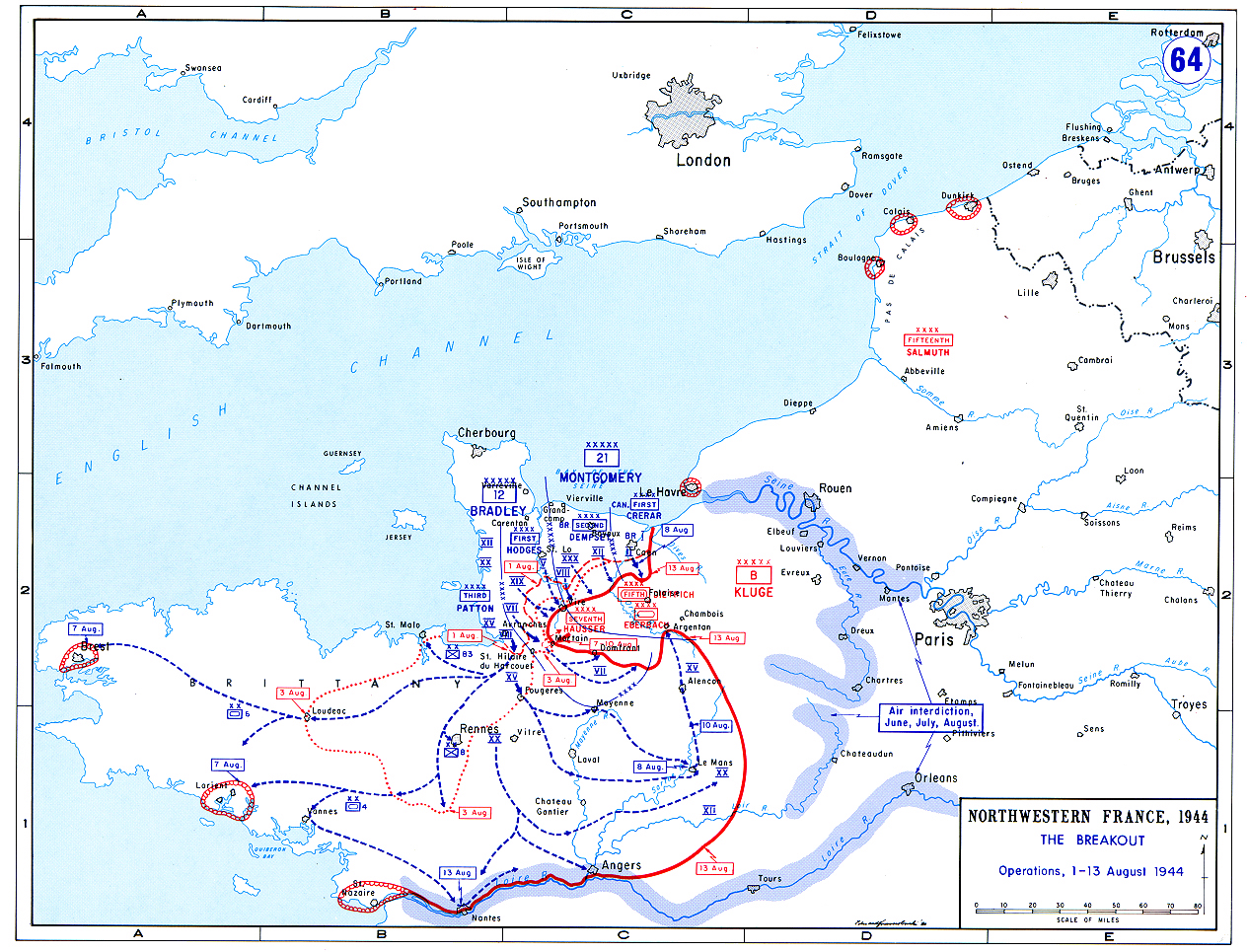
- Map showing the breakout from the Normandy beachhead
Date	18–20 August 1944
Location	Present Day Mantes-la-Jolie, France 49°0′31″N 1°41′12″E
Result	Allied victory

Belligerents
United States	Germany

Commanders and leaders
(United States) George Patton (United States) Ira T. Wyche (United States) Joseph Bacon Fraser	(Nazi Germany) Unknown

Casualties and losses
None	1 tank captured 19 vehicles captured 43 aircraft shot down

General George Patton's Third Army's Seine River Crossing at Mantes-Gassicourt was the first allied bridgehead across the Seine River in the aftermath of Operation Overlord, which allowed the Allies to engage in the Liberation of Paris. During the two days of the bridge crossing, American anti-aircraft artillery shot down almost fifty German planes.

== Background ==
After the successful allied invasion of Normandy in June 1944, The United States Third Army was formed in France to assist in the breakout from Normandy, code named Operation Cobra. The drive to the Seine began on 3 August, when General Bradley instructed Lieutenant General George S. Patton, one of the U.S. Army's greatest exponents of armored warfare, to secure the north-south line of the river Mayenne, clear the area west of the Mayenne as far south as the Loire, and protect the 12th Army Group south flank with minimum forces. Since the VIII Corps was driving southwest toward Rennes and the XV Corps was about to move southeast toward Mayenne, Patton oriented the XX Corps south toward Nantes and Angers. As the main American effort veered eastward in accordance with the modified OVERLORD plan and the XV Corps drove toward Laval and Le Mans, Patton ordered the XX Corps to cross the river Mayenne in a parallel drive to protect the XV Corps south flank.

=== Operation Tractable ===
The Third Army's XV Corp drove from Meyenne South to Le Mans and then North to Argentan by 12 August 1944 where the Battle of the Falaise Pocket was developing against the German Seventh Army . The next day, the 5th U.S. Armored Division of XV U.S. Corps, advanced 35 mi (56 km) and reached positions overlooking Argentan. On 13 August, Bradley over-ruled orders by Patton, for a further push northwards towards Falaise, by the 5th U.S. Armored Division. Bradley ordered the XV U.S. Corps to "concentrate for operations in another direction". The U.S. troops near Argentan were ordered to withdraw, which ended the pincer movement by XV U.S. Corps. Patton objected but complied, which left an exit for the German forces in the Falaise Pocket.

=== The Drive to the Seine ===
The formation of the Falaise Pocket, from 8–17 August 1944

While the XV Corps left part of its forces at Argentan and started the wider envelopment to the Seine on 15 August, other components of the Third Army farther to the south were also driving to the Seine, sweeping clear the vast area north of the river Loire. The advance to the Seine fulfilled a prophecy made a week earlier—that "the battle of Normandy is rapidly developing into the Battle of Western France."

== Crossing ==
Having decided to send part of Patton's force down the west bank of the Seine, the Allied commanders saw a coincident opportunity to seize a bridgehead on the east bank of the river as a springboard for future operations. The XV Corps thus drew a double mission—the 5th Armored Division was to attack down the west bank while the 79th Infantry Division established a bridgehead on the east bank. In his order issued on 20 August, General Montgomery cautioned: "This is no time to relax, or to sit back and congratulate ourselves. . . . Let us finish off the business in record time." By then, American troops were already across the Seine.

General Ira T. Wyche had received a telephone call at 2135, 19 August, from General Haislip, who ordered him to cross the Seine that night. The 79th was to get foot troops on the east bank at once, build a bridge for vehicles, tanks, and heavy equipment, and gain ground in sufficient depth (four to six miles) to protect the crossing sites at Mantes from medium artillery fire.

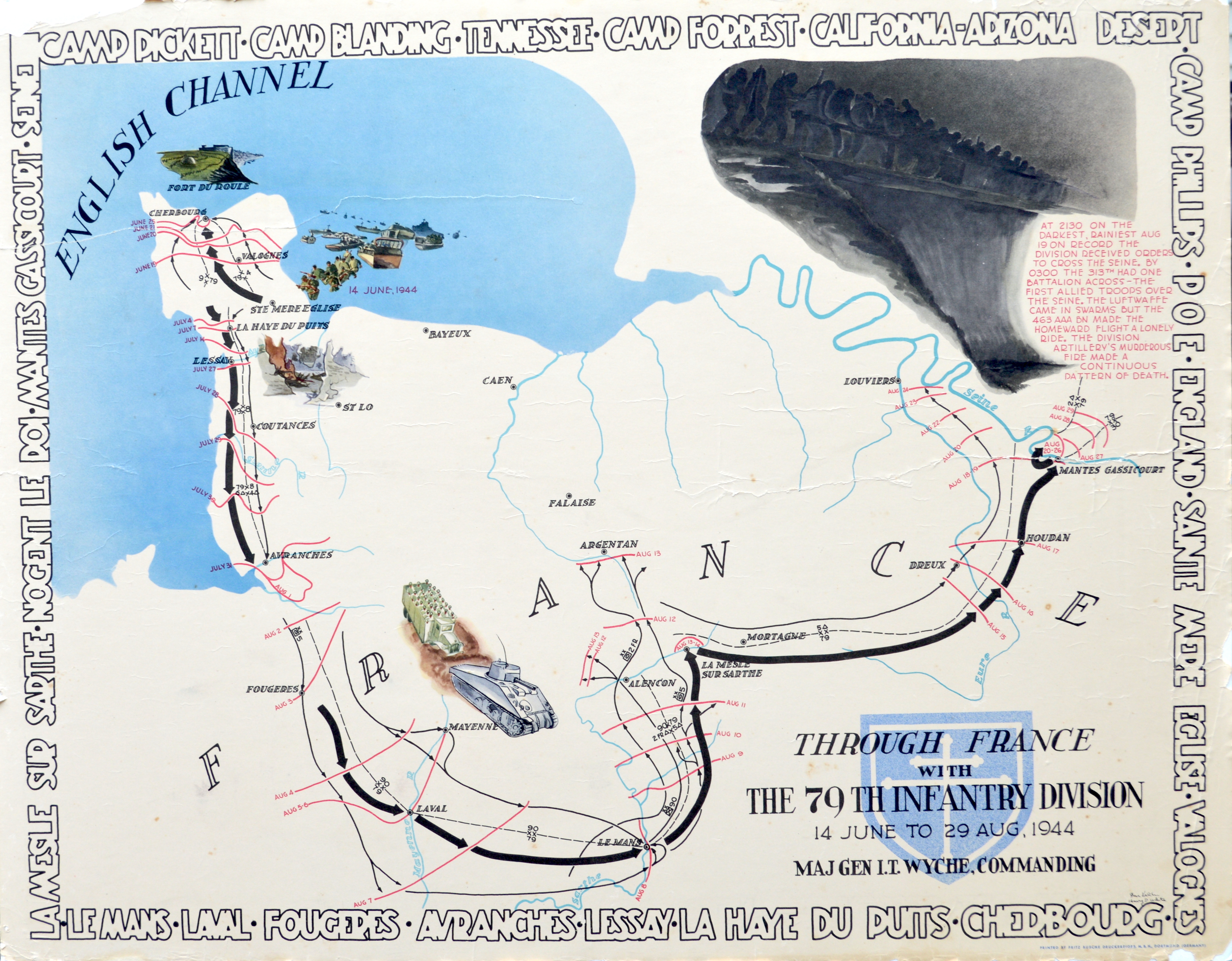
"Through France; 14 Jun - 29 Aug 1944" poster 1 of 4 of battle movements of the 79th Infantry Division.

In a situation that was "too fluid to define an enemy front line," General Wyche anticipated little resistance. His 79th Division had that day engaged only scattered German groups in flight, had captured nineteen vehicles and a Panzer IV tank, and had received only sporadic machine gun fire from across the Seine. The river itself was the main problem, for near Mantes it varied in width from five hundred to eight hundred feet. Fortunately, a dam nearby offered a narrow footpath across it, and engineer assault boats and rafts could transport troops and light equipment. For the bridge he was to build, Wyche secured seven hundred feet of treadway from the 5th Armored Division.

While a torrential rain fell during the night of 19 August, men of the 313th Infantry walked across the dam in single file, each man touching the one ahead to keep from falling into the water. At daybreak on the 20 August, as the 314th Infantry paddled across the river, the division engineers began to install the treadway. In the afternoon, as soon as the bridge was ready, the 315th Infantry crossed in trucks. By nightfall on 20 August, the bulk of the division and its attached units, including tanks, artillery, and tank destroyers, was on the east bank. The following day, battalions of the XV Corps Artillery crossed.

=== Anti-aircraft Defences ===
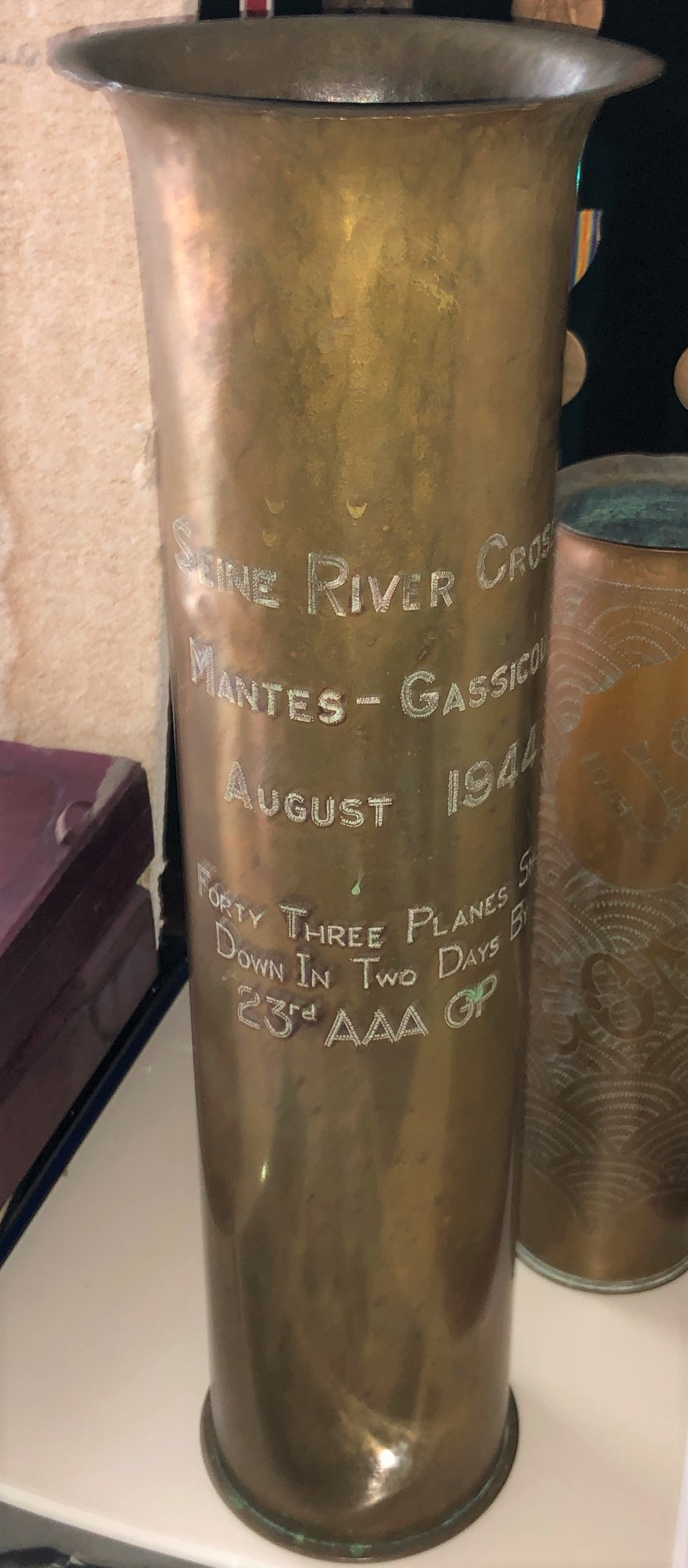
Seine river crossing commemorative shell casing

Under the command of Colonel Joseph Bacon Fraser, the 23rd Anti-Aircraft Artillery Group hurriedly emplaced their pieces around the bridge, arriving in time to shoot down about a dozen enemy planes on the first day and to amass a total of 43 German planes shot down in two days. The number of planes shot down in a day was a record for a World War II American antiaircraft artillery group.

== Aftermath ==
To supplement the treadway bridge, engineers constructed a Bailey bridge that was opened to traffic on 23 August. On the east bank, the 79th Infantry Division not only extended and improved the bridgehead, repelled counterattacks, and interdicted highways, ferry routes, and barge traffic lanes, but also dramatically pointed out to the Germans their critical situation by capturing the Army Group B command post at la Roche-Guyon and sending the German headquarters troops fleeing eastward to Soissons. Once the Allies were on the east side of the Seine, the Free French 2nd Armored Division and US 4th Infantry Division were able to liberate Paris from Nazi occupation on 24–25 August.
