= Sea Pines Resort =

Hotel in South Carolina

Coordinates: 32°09′10″N 80°46′03″W

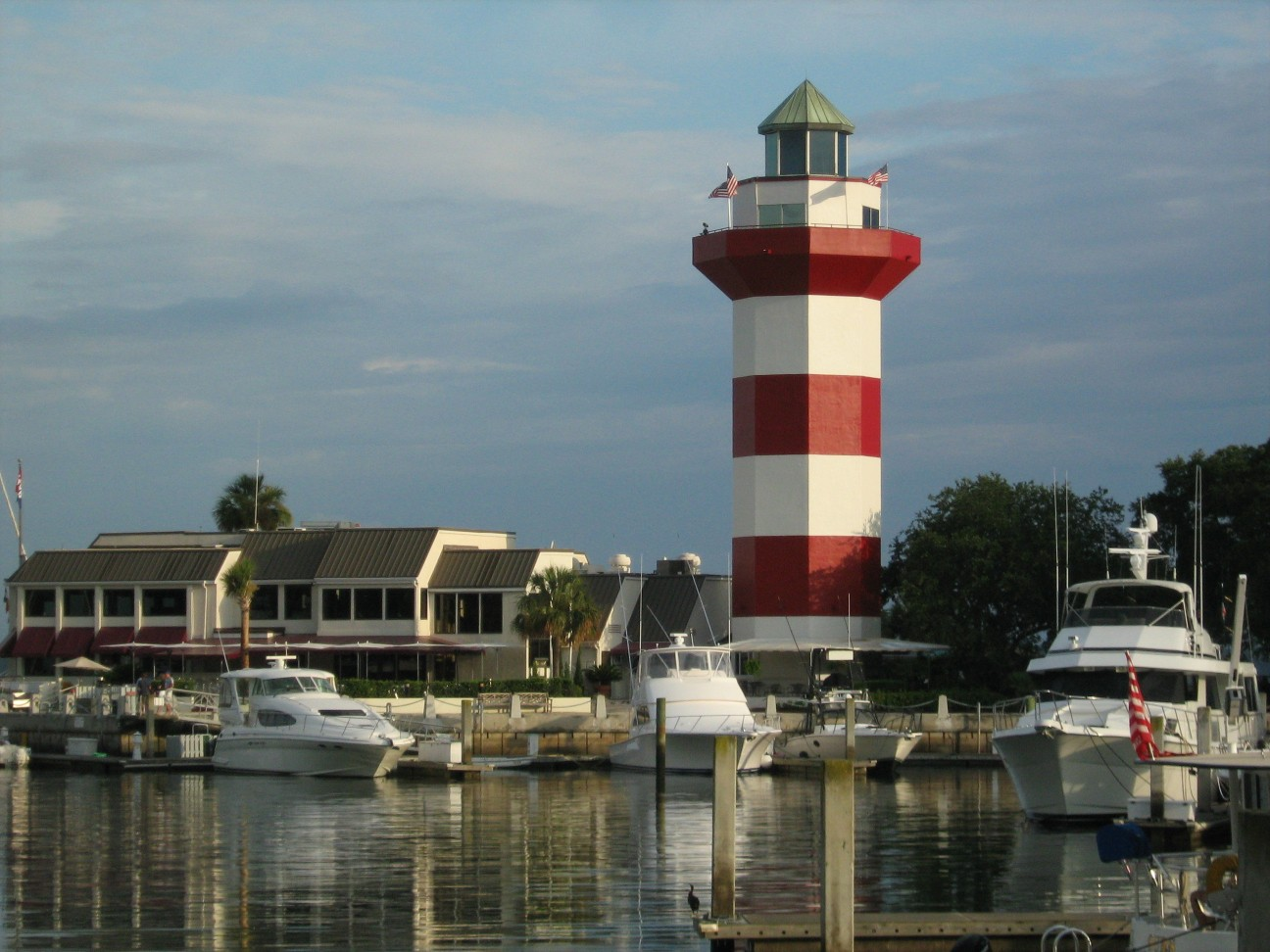
Harbour Town Marina in Sea Pines Resort

The Sea Pines Resort or Sea Pines is located in Sea Pines Plantation, a 5,200-acre private residential gated community located on the southern tip of the island which comprises the town of Hilton Head Island, South Carolina. Sea Pines is home to four golf courses, including Harbour Town Golf Links, Atlantic Dunes by Davis Love III, (formerly known as the Ocean Course), the Heron Point golf course (formerly known as the Sea Marsh course) and the Sea Pines Country Club Course. The RBC Heritage is a PGA Tour event held annually in April at the Harbour Town course.

== History ==
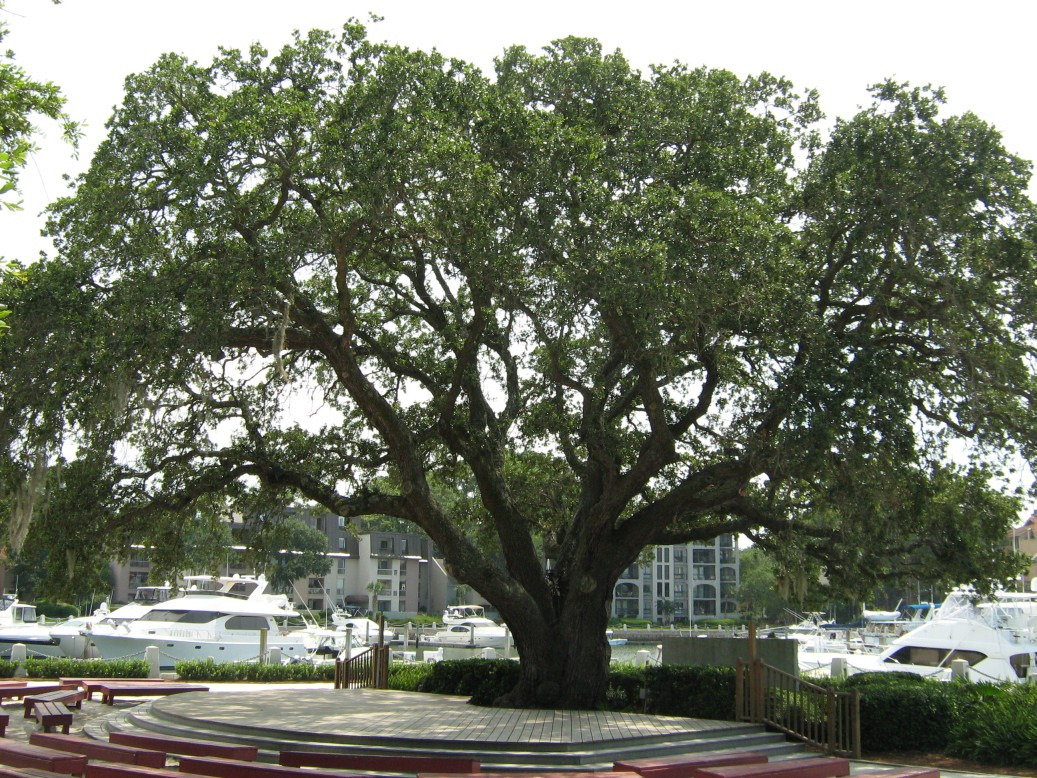
Liberty Oak in Harbour Town

On June 20, 1957, the Sea Pines Company was formed by Charles E. Fraser and Joseph B. Fraser Jr., with their father Joseph B. Fraser Sr. serving as Chairman of the Board. The original offices of the company were located in a trailer on Sea Pines Circle (the intersection of William Hilton Parkway, Palmetto Bay Road, Pope Avenue, and Greenwood Drive). The only phone on the island was a car-based mobile unit.

During the late 60s and early 70s, Fraser hired locals as well as young Turks and pioneered new principles of land development and management, including environmentally sensitive land use, blending with nature rather than overpowering it, and nature oriented tourism. Harvard Business School grads worked alongside creative land planners and contractors. Some of the first computer modeling in the South demonstrated how they would leverage land and their planning with Real Estate Investment Trust and banks.

Fraser encouraged his people to learn through travel, to stay fresh by playing tennis in the middle of the day and picnicking with family and friends and to have plenty of gatherings where networking and cross fertilization would take place. Several developers across the nation that cut their teeth on Fraser and the Sea Pines Company.

In 1967 Fraser had been developing 5,200 acres for 10 years, all on Hilton Head. By 1971 the company had 135,000 acres under development or planning with models showing positive cash in just 3 years. When the Prime Interest Rate jumped from 6 at the beginning of 1973 to 11.75 in October 1974 the company began to unravel as most of their loans were cost 3 points over prime. With a jump of 5 and ¾ percent in such a short time sales had no way to keep up.

Sea Pines changed hands many times in the decade of the 1980s. The Heizer Corporation purchased it in 1982. It was then transferred to an independent investor named Bobby Ginn with the Ginn family. The Ginn family sold assets to Roylat Holding Corporation with the deal financed by Philip Schwab, a stockholder in a large Florida savings and loan organization.

Roylat Holding Corporation had a financial crisis, Federal Judge Sol Blatt of Charleston placed the Roylat Corporation and Schwab's organization in involuntary bankruptcy. The legal team he appointed to rebuild Sea Pines created two organizations to run Sea Pines: Sea Pines Associates, which owns resort properties, and the Community Services Associates (CSA) which owns, maintains, and secures common property and roads within Sea Pines. CSA runs, for example, a 42-man security department which handles traffic violations and other limited law enforcement functions. In March 2005, ownership passed to the Riverstone Group, a private concern owned by William Goodwin of Richmond Virginia, and the resort was renamed The Sea Pines Resort (dropping "Plantation").

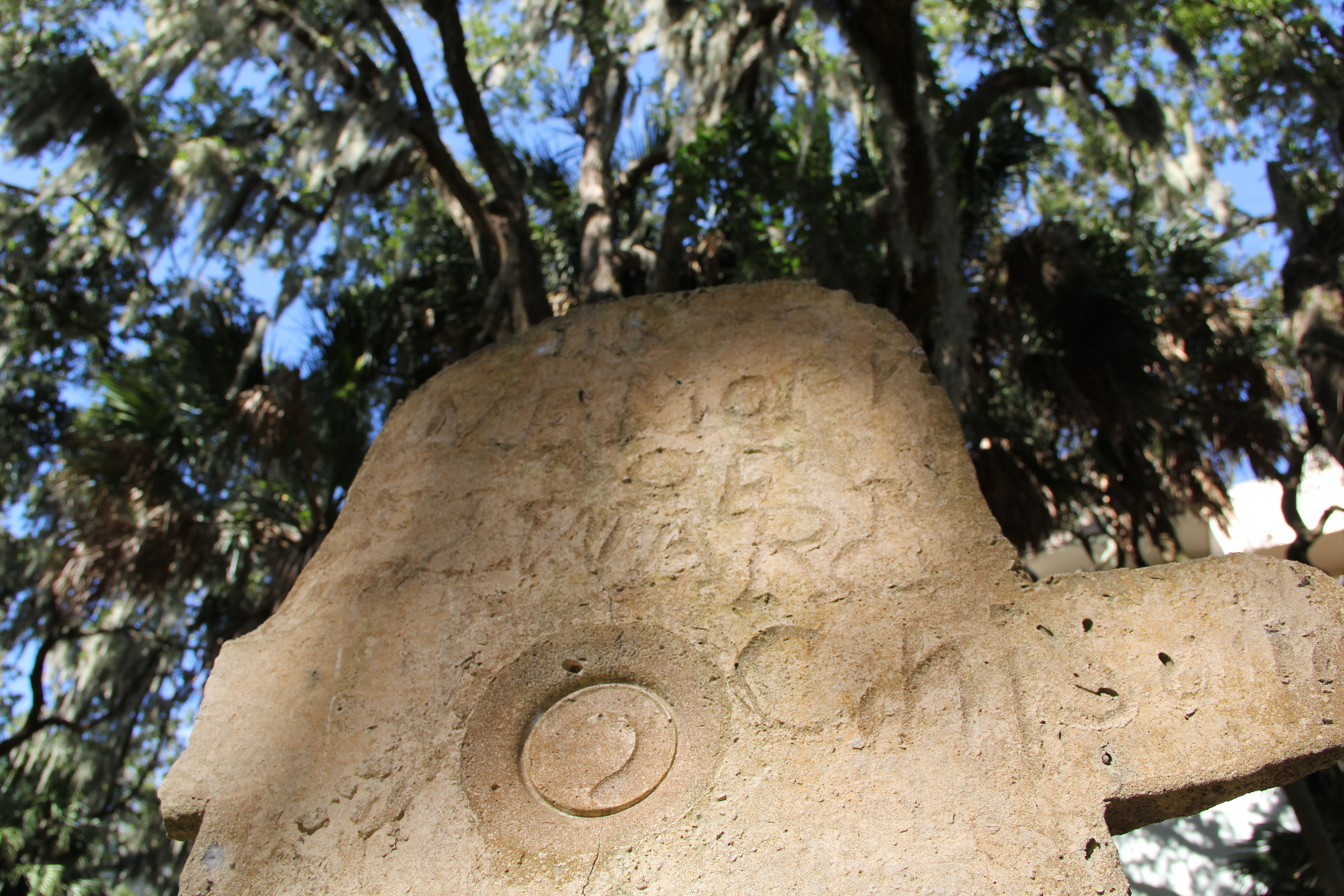
Braddocks Point Cemetery

The Braddock's Point Cemetery, a Gullah sea island cemetery on Hilton Head Island is a historic graveyard hidden between 2 apartment buildings and adjacent to the 18th fairway on Harbour town Golf Links – "the fairway may pass over buried ancestors" which may be the source of the urban legend that the 18th hole is haunted.

== Architecture ==
Charles Fraser, sometimes called the "inventor" of the modern American resort, first envisioned selling only oceanfront and ocean-oriented lots. Plans changed when architect Stuart O. Dawson of Boston planners Sasaki, Dawson, and DeMay developed "T-roads" that made up rows of seaside houses. Golf courses were also beginning to be built, luring would-be residents into the interior of the island with beautiful wooded views. Sea Pines expanded further and further to offer different types of residences as well as a vast array of sports and activities.

Charles Fraser along with many local architects developed an endogenous style of architecture called "The Hilton Head Style" or the "Sea Pines Style" . It was influenced by the 1960 Modern architecture movement, California Modern, Japanese Architecture, Frank Lloyd Wright's Auldbrass in Beaufort County, and the local vernacular style, or "Low Country Architecture". It is categorized by large overhangs, screen porches, low roof slopes, earth tone colors, and landscape with native plants rather than formal southern plantings. The desired effect is to blend the house into nature rather than to stand out.

With rising land prices and a change on public taste this style has largely been abandoned in favor of ever larger private residences, and historically derivative styles from around the world. The best examples of this architecture were built in the period of 1961-1973 in Sea Pines Plantation. Most of these houses, and all on beach front lots, have been torn down for larger residences. Today, houses, villas, condominiums, and hotels within Sea Pines and other plantations have expanded inward to cover virtually the entire island. A current popular trend in housing on the island is the buying up of adjoining lots, tearing down their buildings and building a brand new home covering one, two or three adjoining lots.

== Real estate and rentals ==
The tourism and travel industry in Hilton Head is one of the largest in the country. Sea Pines, as the largest plantation on the island, occupies a large portion of the rental market with properties available for rental year-round.

In recent years, Hilton Head has also developed a large permanent resident population. Hilton Head Island, which has an area of approximately 55 square miles (140 km^{2}), had a year-round population of 37,661 at the 2020 census, although during the peak of summer vacation season the population can swell to 150,000.

The real estate market is also quite lucrative, with the mean residential property in Sea Pines selling for about $639,000 as of February 2018.
