= Charles E. Fraser =

American architect (1929–2002)

- Born: Charles Elbert Fraser; June 13, 1929; Hinesville, Georgia, US
- Died: December 15, 2002 (aged 73); Providenciales, Turks and Caicos
- Education: University of Georgia (BA); Yale University (LLB)
- Occupation: Architect
- Notable work: Sea Pines Plantation; Wintergreen Resort; Amelia Island Plantation; Kiawah Island Resort
- Children: 2
- Parent: Joseph Bacon Fraser (father)
- Relatives: Joseph Bacon Fraser Jr. (brother)

Charles Elbert Fraser (June 13, 1929 – December 15, 2002) was an American real estate developer whose vision helped transform South Carolina's Hilton Head Island from a sparsely populated sea island into a world-class resort. He graduated from the University of Georgia and Yale Law School. Through his company, Sea Pines Company, he developed Sea Pines Plantation, Amelia Island Plantation, River Hills Plantation, and Kiawah Island Resort, among several other master planned communities. Fraser died in 2002 at the age of 73 in a boat explosion in the Turks and Caicos Islands while on a consulting project.

== Early years ==
Fraser was born to Joseph Bacon Fraser and Pearl Collins Fraser in Hinesville, Georgia, (sister of Cecil Collins Sr.) on June 13, 1929. His older brother, Joseph Bacon Fraser Jr., was his business partner at Sea Pines. Charles's father, Joseph, was a prominent Hinesville figure, a U.S. Army veteran of World War I, World War II, and the Korean War, last serving as Major General, commanding the 48th Armored Division of Georgia and Florida Army National Guard before retiring a Lieutenant General in 1956. More importantly for the start of Charles's career, his father was active in the timber industry as head of the Fraser Lumber Company and the Fraser Supply Company.

In 1946, he enrolled at Presbyterian College in Clinton, South Carolina, and attended until 1948, when he transferred to the University of Georgia. In 1949, while Fraser was at the Terry College of Business at the University of Georgia, a group of lumber associates from Hinesville, Georgia, bought a total of 20,000 acres of pine forest on Hilton Head's southern end for an average of nearly $60 an acre. They formed The Hilton Head Company to handle the timber operation. The associates were Gen. Joseph B. Fraser, Fred C. Hack, Olin T. McIntosh, and C.C. Stebbins. Charles's brother Joe Jr., was sent by their father to undeveloped Hilton Head Island to cruise and estimate the timber value, setting up camp on Calibogue Cay off the south end of the island.

In the summer of 1950, Charlie Fraser worked in the island logging camp, after he graduated from the University of Georgia and before he entered Yale Law School. At the time there were only about 500 people living on Hilton Head. They were mostly farmers and oyster workers who traveled by boat to Savannah to sell their products. Fraser was entranced by the island and saw its potential to attract many more people to its beautiful beaches, virgin pine forests and rich groves of great live oaks. He convinced his father to give him a twenty-year note on the land and complete legal control. Fraser entered law school in the fall and made the development of a master plan the focus of his education.

After Yale Law School, Fraser practiced law briefly with Hull, Willingham, Towell, and Norman in Augusta, Georgia, and served in the U.S. Air Force, working in the office of the general counsel in Washington, D.C.

== Sea Pines Company ==
=== Sea Pines Plantation development ===
In 1955, at age 26, Fraser drafted a land-use plan for a low-density development on timberland at the southern end of Hilton Head Island on which his family held an interest. The following year, Charles bought his father's interest in the Hilton Head Company and began developing it into Sea Pines Plantation.

- 1957: Sells first lots in Sea Pines Plantation.
- 1959: Opens William Hilton Inn, a 56-room hotel on present-day site of Marriott's Grande Ocean Resort.
- 1960: The Ocean Course in Sea Pines is built, the first golf course on Hilton Head.
- 1967-69: Builds Harbour Town, with its signature red-and-white striped lighthouse.
- 1968: Completes Harbour Town Golf Links, designed by Jack Nicklaus and Pete Dye. The same year is first U.S. recipient of the American Institute of Architects' Certificate of Excellence in Private Community Planning.
- 1969: Helps found Heritage Classic golf tournament.

=== Repeating the model: other developments ===
- 1969: Sea Pines Company develops Wintergreen Resort in the Blue Ridge Mountains of Virginia.
- 1970: Sea Pines Company buys Lewith Group and begins development of River Hills Plantation in Lake Wylie, SC.
- 1970: Sea Pines buys 2,400 acres of an old coconut plantation with 6 miles of beach on the southeastern coast of Puerto Rico to begin planning Palmas Del Mar. The company paid $8.5 Million.
- 1970: Acquired land on Amelia Island, Florida south of Fernandina Beach and began development of Amelia Island Plantation.
- 1971: Sea Pines Company sells Cumberland Island holdings to the National Park Foundation, followed by the creation of the Cumberland Island National Seashore.
- 1971: With the sale of the Hilton Head Company, Sea Pines Company acquires land on the north end of the island for the development of Hilton Head Plantation.
- 1972: Sea Pines unveils plan for development of 1,600 acres of land in its natural state into the Isle of Palms Beach and Racquet Club (now Wild Dunes).
- 1972: The Sea Pines Company buys 90% of a partnership created two years prior between Chesterfield Land and Timber Company and Reynolds, Smith, and Hills, an architectural firm from Jackson, Florida, to develop a community in Chesterfield County called Swift Creek.
- 1972: The Amelia Island Plantation master plan is unveiled.
- 1973: Charles Fraser and Sea Pines hire 11 MBA graduates from Harvard University. He is written up in Time magazine for the feat.
- 1973: stock market begins 2 year bear Market due to oil embargoes, the Nixon Scandal and more. This would be the height of the Sea Pines Company.
- 1974: The Kiawah Island Company Ltd. bought the 4000 acre Kiawah Island from the C. C. Royal family. Sea Pines enters into a contract with the Kiawah Island Company to undertake and supervise the planning and developing the Island into a luxury resort. The services to be performed for the development of the island were basically the same kind of services performed by a landscape architect in preparing a site plan, or an architect in designing a building. Sea Pines was to supply a trained staff to Kiawah. It was to furnish plans and supervision of construction.
- 1974: Sea Pines Company Operating responsibilities turned over from Charles Fraser to 31-year-old president James L. Wright in attempt to keep lenders at bay and fend off bankruptcy.
- 1974: Sports Illustrated shoots the swimsuit edition at Palmas Del Mar.
- 1975: Palmas Del Mar went bankrupt due to inflated labor costs and the burden of providing utilities and roads. As Fraser acknowledged, "we slowly discovered that Puerto Rico was "a bottomless pit of intractable problems" for the community builder.
- 1975: Sea Pines Company loses control of Hilton Head Plantation to Citibank of New York and First Chicago Bank.
- 1976: Amelia Island Plantation bankrupt, sold to Richard Cooper Investments.
- 1976: The Brandermill Group, including one of Charles E. Fraser's Proteges, Harry Framton, buys out Sea Pines' interest in Swift Creek and renames the plantation Brandermill.
- 1976: Wintergreen Resort sold to Melba Investors.
- 1976-1977: Sea Pines is sued and countersued by the Kuwait Investment Company. The final out-of-court settlement called for Sea Pines to receive $500,000 and all Sea Pines management contracts for Kiawah Island Plantation severed.
- 1977: Brandermill named "The Best Planned Community in America" by Better Homes and Gardens and the National Association of Home Builders.
- 1983: Steps down as chairman of Sea Pines Company. When it is sold, he is retained as a consultant.

== Later in life ==
- 1980-1982: Fraser was nominated by President Jimmy Carter to be the Commissioner General of the US Government for the Energy-Expo '82, formally known as the Knoxville International Energy Exposition. Charles would resign from this post before the event and President Ronald Reagan appointed Dortch Oldham to replace Charles on April 26, 1982.
- 1987-1997: President of Charles E. Fraser Company and Community Design Institute. The companies' work included consulting for The Walt Disney Company's new town of Celebration, near Orlando, Florida, and a $2 billion water reservoir in southern California.

== Personal life ==
- 1963: Marries Mary Wyman Stone of Greenville, South Carolina. The couple have two daughters, Mary Wyman Stone Fraser Davis and Laura Lawton Fraser.
- 1963-1966: Served two terms as Chairman and Vice Chairman of the Beaufort County Council.
- 1969-1970: Charles E. Fraser and Fred Hack fight BASF form developing a chemical plan on the Colleton River in Victoria Bluff near Bluffton, SC and the present site of South Carolina DNR's Waddell Mariculture Center.
- 1974-1975: Served as the Chair of National Recreation and Park Association.
- 1981: With Phil and Linda Lader, helped organize Renaissance Weekend that was held annually over New Year's Weekend on Hilton Head Island for more than 15 years.
- 1991: Diagnosed with cancer.
- 2001: Guest lectured at Clemson University for their Real Estate Development curriculums. He would later have a Clemson Advancement Foundation Endowment and the Hilton Head Island/Charles E. Fraser Professorship in Community Design and Human Ecology in his name.
- Sold Daws Island, an archeological site and maritime hammock in Port Royal Sound to the State of South Carolina. Charles's nephew West Fraser, a famous plein air artist in Charleston, SC, would later paint many of his subjects there.

Charles died on December 15, 2002 when the 28-foot chartered Sun Dance yacht exploded and threw him, his wife, youngest daughter and others into the water. The accident caused him to drown, authorities said. The accident occurred near Providenciales in the Turks and Caicos Islands. At his eulogy a week later, his wife, Mary said when the explosion occurred, Fraser did not know it was coming. "He was looking at the coastline of the development of the Turks and Caicos," Mary Fraser said. "He wanted to do that. It was a beautiful day."

== Honors ==
- July 15, 1974: Selected by Time magazine as one of "America's 200 upcoming leaders."
- 1977: Inducted as an Honorary Member of the American Society of Landscape Architects. Honorary membership is one of the highest honors ASLA may bestow upon non-landscape architects, and since its founding in 1899, the Society has conferred honorary membership upon less than 100 individuals. This honor recognizes individuals whose achievements of national or international significance or influence have provided notable service to the profession of landscape architecture.
- 1990: Named by "Southern Living" magazine as one of 25 "Southerners Who Are Making the Difference" in the South's quality of life.
- 1994: Receives Urban Land Institute's "Heritage Award" in recognition of innovative planning and development.
- 2004: Urban Land Institute creates the Charles Fraser Senior Resident Fellow for Sustainable Development.
- 2011: The National Association of Home Builders (NAHB) inducted innovative resort developer Charles E. Fraser into the National Housing Hall of Fame on Friday, May 20, 2011 during the association's board of directors meeting in Washington, D.C.
- 2015: Inducted posthumously into the inaugural class of The Low Country Golf Hall of Fame.

== Monuments ==
- 1999: Cross Island Parkway bridge over Broad Creek is named Charles E. Fraser Bridge.
- 2010: Unveiling of the Charles E. Fraser Statue in Compass Rose Park. The statue is the product of several years of planning by the Community Foundation of the Lowcountry and its Public Art Fund, created in 2005. It depicts the photograph that appeared in the March 3, 1962 edition of the Saturday Evening Post showing Fraser walking with an alligator on the Sea Pines Ocean Course. The Community Foundation commissioned sculptor Susie Chisholm of Savannah to create the Fraser statue, which measures just over 6 feet tall. Darrell Davis of Texas sculpted the 10-foot-long alligator.

== References in popular culture ==
- 1971: Fraser was featured as in John McPhee's nonfiction book, Encounters with the Archdruid, a National Book Award finalist. Part of the book centers on blocking Sea Pines Company from developing a resort and residential community on Cumberland Island. The Sea Pines Company never got beyond establishing the sea camp and today the island is a National Seashore in the National Park System.
- March 1971: Fraser was featured in the profiles section The New Yorker, titled "Encounters with the Archdruid II - An Island." The writer accompanies Charles E. Fraser and David Brower on a tour of Cumberland Island, Georgia.
- July 1996: Fraser was mentioned as the consultant for Disney's planned community, Celebration, FL, in an article in The New Yorker.
