= Harbour Town Golf Links =

Public golf course in South Carolina, United States

- Location within the United States Location within South Carolina
- 32.136°N 80.810°W

Club information
- Location: Hilton Head Island, South Carolina, U.S.
- Established: 1967, 59 years ago
- Type: Public
- Tota holes: 18
- Tournaments: RBC Heritage (1969–present)
- Website: Official website
- Designed by: Pete Dye, Jack Nicklaus, and Davis Love III
- Par: 71
- Length: 7,099 yards (6,491 m)
- Course rating: 75.6
- Slope rating: 148
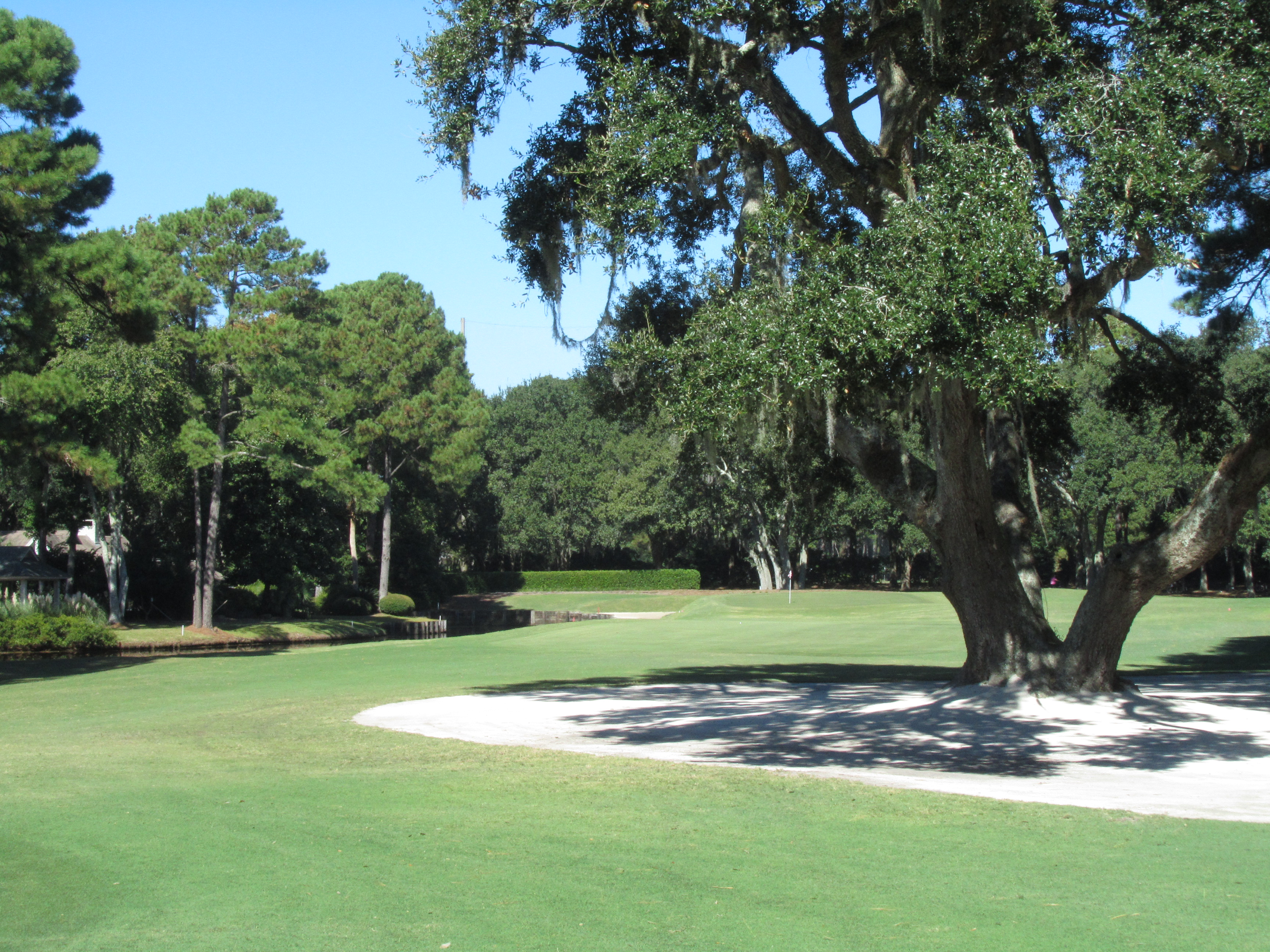
- Harbour Town Golf Links in 2010

Harbour Town Golf Links is a public golf course in the eastern United States, located in South Carolina in Sea Pines Plantation on Hilton Head Island in Beaufort County. Since 1969, it has hosted the RBC Heritage on the PGA Tour, usually in mid-April, the week after The Masters.

Often referred to in the context of the PGA simply as "Hilton Head", Harbour Town Golf Links is ranked high among golf courses in America by Golf Digest and Golf Magazine. The course consists of narrow fairways, overhanging oaks, pines, palmettos, and dark lagoons. Harbour Town, along with the Atlantic Dunes (formerly known as Ocean Course) and Heron Point, make up the Sea Pines Resort.

== General information ==
Harbour Town Golf Links was designed by Pete Dye in 1967 with the help of professional golfer Jack Nicklaus. Dye also designed another course in the Sea Pines Resort, Heron Point, which he redesigned in 2007. The course is open all year, even during overseeding in October and the aerating of the greens in June, July, and August.

Green fees for public play range from $195 to $470, depending on the season. An estimated 38,000 rounds of golf are played at Harbour Town every year.

=== Grass types ===
The holes at Harbour Town Golf Links consist of seven different types of grass. Five of the grass types, four of which are Bermudas, are able to withstand the heat during the warm summer months of Hilton Head Island. The other two grass types are annually overseeded in October in order to keep the course green during the cold months. The rye grass that is planted in October is only temporary and will eventually die out when the weather warms up, and the Bermuda grass is no longer dormant. The fairways and rough consist of 419 Bermuda grass.

The tee boxes are made up of Celebration Bermuda as well as TifSports Bermuda. The fairways, rough, and tee boxes are overseeded with rye grass in October. Several tee boxes are composed of Empire Zoysia which does not become dormant (brown) in the winter. These Zoysia tee boxes do not need do be overseeded. Harbour Town Golf Links' greens consist of TifEagle Bermuda which is overseeded with Poa Trivialis in October. The course superintendent, Jonathan Wright, is in charge of maintaining the different types of grass.

=== Magazine rankings ===
Golf Digest ranked Harbour Town the 2011-2012 #21 ranked public course in America after previously being ranked #13 in 2010.

PGA Tour professionals rated Harbour Town the #2 ranked golf course played on tour in a survey performed by Golf Digest.

Golf Magazine rates Harbour Town the 2012 #12 rated public course in America. In 2010, it was ranked #14 in the country by Golf Magazine.

== Course information ==
Harbour Town Golf Links is a par 71 course and 7,099 yards (6,491 m) from the back tees, relatively short for a PGA Tour event; most are on courses that average 7,300 yards (6,680 m). For its inaugural tour event in 1969, the course was set at 6,655 yards (6,085 m). It has slick and firm Bermuda grass greens that are small in size; they average 3,700 square feet (340 m^{2}) in area, while the average on tour is 6,600 sq ft (610 m^{2}).

Several holes have a very small margin of error between greens and water hazards (4, 8, 14, 17, 18). Tee shots and lay-ups must be placed in the strategic part of fairway in order to have a direct shot into the green. Sometimes golfers get blocked out by overhanging trees, even if they are in the fairway. Holes in which players may be blocked out from the fairway include numbers 1, 2, 8, 9, 10, 11, 12, 13, 15, and 16. Compared to other courses Harbour Town has high percentage of holes with this challenge.

The ninth hole is a tight par 4 that can be reached from the tee with a long drive. It normally plays around 325 yards (297 m), tempting golfers to go for a small green guarded by bunkers. The two finishing holes are along Calibogue Sound, so the water line can vary due to changing tides. The hazard line is permanent, but shots can be played off the sand at low tide. On the final two holes, wind off the water must be factored. The seventeenth hole, a par three, plays southwest and usually into a headwind. The eighteenth is the signature hole and heads northward; its entire left side is guarded by the sound and the right is lined with out of bounds stakes. The red-and-white-striped Harbour Town lighthouse is a backdrop, often a good target for approach shots to the green.

Harbour Town Golf Links at The Sea Pines Resort
Tee	Rating/Slope	1	2	3	4	5	6	7	8	9	Out	10	11	12	13	14	15	16	17	18	In	Total
Heritage	75.6/148	410	502	469	200	549	419	195	473	332	3549	451	436	430	373	192	588	434	174	472	3550	7099
Dye	73.3/144	392	495	411	187	511	404	172	435	322	3329	421	413	404	354	165	571	395	185	444	3352	6681
Sea Pines	M 71.4/136 L 76.2/144	380	471	381	165	497	373	160	405	298	3130	398	387	376	339	148	541	361	159	414	3123	6253
Carolina	M 69.6/131 L 74.1/137	347	424	355	155	485	360	148	380	283	2937	358	365	360	324	138	511	333	141	400	2930	5867
SI		11	13	9	15	5	3	17	1	7		12	6	8	10	18	4	14	16	2
Par		4	5	4	3	5	4	3	4	4	36	4	4	4	4	3	5	4	3	4	35	71
SI		11	3	9	17	5	13	15	1	7		10	14	12	8	16	4	6	18	2
Palmetto	M 66.7/118 L 69.8/126	330	383	315	140	427	318	113	309	267	2602	324	285	272	307	107	421	304	130	332	2482	5084

== The Heritage Classic ==
Beginning in 1969, Harbour Town Golf Links has hosted the annual RBC Heritage on the PGA Tour, long held in April the week following the Masters Tournament in Augusta, Georgia. Royal Bank of Canada (RBC) is the current sponsor; Verizon discontinued their sponsorship of the event after 2010.

The inaugural "Heritage Golf Classic" in 1969 was held in late November over the Thanksgiving weekend, with a winner's share of $20,000. Forty-year-old Arnold Palmer claimed the first victory with 283 (–1) for his 55th win on tour, but his first in over a year. The Heritage Classic, undergoing several different official names, has been held at Harbour Town annually since 1969. The founder of Sea Pines, Charles E. Fraser, started the tradition of the Heritage Classic, and the tournament is always started with a ceremonial tee shot into Calibogue Sound by the defending champion; a cannon is fired simultaneously as the ball is struck.

PGA Tour professionals rated the course #2 in a Golf Digest survey named "Top 10 PGA Tour Courses" in 2012, behind only Augusta National, ranked the world's greatest golf course by Golf Digest.

Harbour Town offers a different sort of challenge than most of the courses played on the PGA Tour, due to the short yardage and tight fairways. Most tour courses are much longer in yardage but have a wider margin of error off the tee and through the green. Strategically placed oaks, pines, and palmettos line and overhang the slim fairways. Professionals will sometimes have no direct shot to the green, even from the fairway. Tee shots have to find the ideal side of the fairway in order to score well. Another challenging aspect of the course is from the small and slick Bermuda greens. Breaks are subtle and tricky to read as a result of the grain present in the Bermuda grass. Lagoons and inner coastal waterways edge up to the greens forcing players to take more conservative shots.

Winning scores vary considerably from year to year because of the different challenges. Tour players may take advantage of the short yardages and having wedge shots into the greens, but at the same time run the risk of finding themselves in the thick trees with no shot or in a water hazard. The record low score at The Heritage is 262 (–22) by Webb Simpson in 2020, with a victory margin of one shot. That event was held in mid-June, postponed two months due to the COVID-19 pandemic. Champions now win a prize of $3.6 million, as well as the traditional tartan plaid jacket.
