= RBC Heritage =

Golf tournament held in South Carolina, United States

Coordinates: 32.136°N 80.810°W

Tournament information
- Location: Hilton Head Island, South Carolina
- Established: 1969
- Course: Harbour Town Golf Links
- Par: 71
- Length: 7,191 yards (6,575 m)
- Organized by: The Heritage Classic Foundation
- Tour: PGA Tour
- Format: Stroke play
- Prize fund: US$20,000,000
- Month played: April
- Website: rbcheritage.com

Tournament record score
- Aggregate: 262 Webb Simpson (2020)
- To par: −22 as above

Current champion
- (England) Matt Fitzpatrick

Final champion
- Location in the United States Location in South Carolina

The RBC Heritage, known for much of its history as the Heritage Classic or simply The Heritage, is a PGA Tour event in South Carolina, first played in 1969. Since 1983 it has taken place in mid-April, the week after The Masters in Augusta, Georgia.

The venue for its entire existence has been the Harbour Town Golf Links at the Sea Pines Resort on Hilton Head Island. The Harbour Town course, which frequently appears on several "Best Courses" lists, was designed by famed golf course architect Pete Dye, with assistance from Jack Nicklaus. In 1972, the first two rounds were played on both the Harbour Town Golf Links and the Ocean course at Sea Pines, with the final two rounds at Harbour Town.

Originally played in late November, it moved to mid-September in 1973, March in 1974, and April in 1983. The inaugural champion in 1969 was forty-year-old Arnold Palmer, his first win in over a year. Course co-designer Nicklaus won in 1975, two weeks before his fifth Masters win. Davis Love III leads with five victories in the event, Hale Irwin and Stewart Cink have three, while seven others have won twice.

From 1987 through 2010, it was sponsored either by MCI (under both the "MCI" and "WorldCom" names) or its eventual purchaser, Verizon. The tournament operated without a title sponsor in 2011, and the Royal Bank of Canada has been the title sponsor of The Heritage since 2012. It is currently organized by The Heritage Classic Foundation.

== Course ==
| Hole | 1 | 2 | 3 | 4 | 5 | 6 | 7 | 8 | 9 | Out | 10 | 11 | 12 | 13 | 14 | 15 | 16 | 17 | 18 | In | Total |
|---|---|---|---|---|---|---|---|---|---|---|---|---|---|---|---|---|---|---|---|---|---|
| Yards | 410 | 502 | 469 | 200 | 549 | 419 | 195 | 473 | 332 | 3,549 | 451 | 436 | 430 | 373 | 192 | 588 | 434 | 174 | 472 | 3,550 | 7,099 |
| Par | 4 | 5 | 4 | 3 | 5 | 4 | 3 | 4 | 4 | 36 | 4 | 4 | 4 | 4 | 3 | 5 | 4 | 3 | 4 | 35 | 71 |

- The course length at the inaugural event in 1969 was 6,655 yards (6,085 m).

== Invitational status ==
The Heritage is one of only five tournaments given "invitational" status by the PGA Tour, and consequently it has a reduced field of only 69 players in 2024 (as opposed to most full-field open tournaments with a field of 156 players). The other four tournaments with invitational status are the Arnold Palmer Invitational, the Charles Schwab Challenge, the Memorial Tournament, and the Genesis Invitational. Invitational tournaments have smaller fields, and have more freedom than full-field open tournaments in determining which players are eligible to participate in their event, as invitational tournaments are not required to fill their fields using the PGA Tour Priority Ranking System. Furthermore, unlike full-field open tournaments, invitational tournaments do not offer open qualifying (aka Monday qualifying).

For the 2026 tournament, it will serve as the Tournament of Champions featuring all 2025 calendar year PGA Tour winners.

== Field ==
The field consists of 70 or more invited using the following criteria:

1. Top 50 in the previous year's FedEx Cup Standings. (BMW PGA Championship qualifiers)
2. Top 10 in the current year PGA Tour FedEx Cup standings as of the Masters Tournament that were not in the previous year's Top 50.
3. Aon Swing 5 (Puerto Rico Open, Valspar Championship, Texas Children's Houston Open and Valero Texas Open)
4. Current year PGA Tour full FedEx Cup points tournament winners.
5. Top 30 Official World Golf Rankings
6. 2026 Only – All 2025 calendar year winners on the PGA Tour (full field and opposite field events) will participate.

== Playing history ==
The tournament has been played in the month of

- November (1969–72)
- September (1973)
- March (1974–82) - usually two weeks before The Masters
- April (1983– ) - usually the week after The Masters
  - Exception: In 2020, it was postponed until June due to the COVID-19 pandemic.

== Winners ==
| Year | Winner | Score | To par | Margin of victory | Runner(s)-up | Purse ($) | Winner's share ($) |
RBC Heritage
| 2026 | (England) Matt Fitzpatrick (2) | 266 | −18 | Playoff | (United States) Scottie Scheffler | 20,000,000 | 3,600,000 |
| 2025 | (United States) Justin Thomas | 267 | −17 | Playoff | (United States) Andrew Novak | 20,000,000 | 3,600,000 |
| 2024 | (United States) Scottie Scheffler | 265 | −19 | 3 strokes | (United States) Sahith Theegala | 20,000,000 | 3,600,000 |
| 2023 | (England) Matt Fitzpatrick | 267 | −17 | Playoff | (United States) Jordan Spieth | 20,000,000 | 3,600,000 |
| 2022 | (United States) Jordan Spieth | 271 | −13 | Playoff | (United States) Patrick Cantlay | 8,000,000 | 1,440,000 |
| 2021 | (United States) Stewart Cink (3) | 265 | −19 | 4 strokes | (Argentina) Emiliano Grillo (United States) Harold Varner III | 7,100,000 | 1,278,000 |
| 2020 | (United States) Webb Simpson | 262 | −22 | 1 stroke | (Mexico) Abraham Ancer | 7,100,000 | 1,278,000 |
| 2019 | (Taiwan) Pan Cheng-tsung | 272 | −12 | 1 stroke | (United States) Matt Kuchar | 6,900,000 | 1,242,000 |
| 2018 | (Japan) Satoshi Kodaira | 272 | −12 | Playoff | (South Korea) Kim Si-woo | 6,700,000 | 1,206,000 |
| 2017 | (United States) Wesley Bryan | 271 | −13 | 1 stroke | (England) Luke Donald | 6,500,000 | 1,170,000 |
| 2016 | (South Africa) Branden Grace | 275 | −9 | 2 strokes | (England) Luke Donald (Scotland) Russell Knox | 5,900,000 | 1,062,000 |
| 2015 | (United States) Jim Furyk (2) | 266 | −18 | Playoff | (United States) Kevin Kisner | 5,900,000 | 1,062,000 |
| 2014 | (United States) Matt Kuchar | 273 | −11 | 1 stroke | (England) Luke Donald | 5,800,000 | 1,044,000 |
| 2013 | (Northern Ireland) Graeme McDowell | 275 | −9 | Playoff | (United States) Webb Simpson | 5,800,000 | 1,044,000 |
| 2012 | (Sweden) Carl Pettersson | 270 | −14 | 5 strokes | (United States) Zach Johnson | 5,700,000 | 1,026,000 |
The Heritage
| 2011 | (United States) Brandt Snedeker | 272 | −12 | Playoff | (England) Luke Donald | 5,700,000 | 1,026,000 |
Verizon Heritage
| 2010 | (United States) Jim Furyk | 271 | −13 | Playoff | (England) Brian Davis | 5,700,000 | 1,026,000 |
| 2009 | (United States) Brian Gay | 264 | −20 | 10 strokes | (United States) Briny Baird (England) Luke Donald | 5,700,000 | 1,026,000 |
| 2008 | (United States) Boo Weekley (2) | 269 | −15 | 3 strokes | (Australia) Aaron Baddeley (United States) Anthony Kim | 5,500,000 | 990,000 |
| 2007 | (United States) Boo Weekley | 270 | −14 | 1 stroke | (South Africa) Ernie Els | 5,400,000 | 972,000 |
| 2006 | (Australia) Aaron Baddeley | 269 | −15 | 1 stroke | (United States) Jim Furyk | 5,300,000 | 954,000 |
MCI Heritage
| 2005 | (Australia) Peter Lonard | 277 | −7 | 2 strokes | (United States) Billy Andrade (Northern Ireland) Darren Clarke (United States) Jim Furyk (United States) Davis Love III | 5,200,000 | 936,000 |
| 2004 | (United States) Stewart Cink (2) | 274 | −10 | Playoff | (United States) Ted Purdy | 4,800,000 | 864,000 |
| 2003 | (United States) Davis Love III (5) | 271 | −13 | Playoff | (United States) Woody Austin | 4,500,000 | 810,000 |
WorldCom Classic - The Heritage of Golf
| 2002 | (United States) Justin Leonard | 270 | −14 | 1 stroke | (United States) Heath Slocum | 4,000,000 | 720,000 |
| 2001 | (Argentina) José Cóceres | 273 | −11 | Playoff | (United States) Billy Mayfair | 3,500,000 | 630,000 |
MCI Classic
| 2000 | (United States) Stewart Cink | 270 | −14 | 2 strokes | (United States) Tom Lehman | 3,000,000 | 540,000 |
| 1999 | (United States) Glen Day | 274 | −10 | Playoff | (United States) Jeff Sluman (United States) Payne Stewart | 2,500,000 | 450,000 |
| 1998 | (United States) Davis Love III (4) | 266 | −18 | 7 strokes | (United States) Glen Day | 1,900,000 | 342,000 |
| 1997 | (Zimbabwe) Nick Price | 269 | −15 | 6 strokes | (United States) Brad Faxon (Sweden) Jesper Parnevik | 1,500,000 | 270,000 |
| 1996 | (United States) Loren Roberts | 265 | −19 | 3 strokes | (United States) Mark O'Meara | 1,400,000 | 252,000 |
| 1995 | (United States) Bob Tway | 275 | −9 | Playoff | (South Africa) David Frost (United States) Nolan Henke | 1,300,000 | 234,000 |
MCI Heritage Golf Classic
| 1994 | (United States) Hale Irwin (3) | 266 | −18 | 2 strokes | (Australia) Greg Norman | 1,250,000 | 225,000 |
| 1993 | (United States) David Edwards | 273 | −11 | 2 strokes | (South Africa) David Frost | 1,125,000 | 202,500 |
| 1992 | (United States) Davis Love III (3) | 269 | −15 | 4 strokes | (United States) Chip Beck | 1,000,000 | 180,000 |
| 1991 | (United States) Davis Love III (2) | 271 | −13 | 2 strokes | (United States) Ian Baker-Finch | 1,000,000 | 180,000 |
| 1990 | (United States) Payne Stewart (2) | 276 | −8 | Playoff | (United States) Steve Jones (United States) Larry Mize | 1,000,000 | 180,000 |
| 1989 | (United States) Payne Stewart | 268 | −16 | 5 strokes | (United States) Kenny Perry | 800,000 | 144,000 |
| 1988 | (Australia) Greg Norman | 271 | −13 | 1 stroke | (South Africa) David Frost (United States) Gil Morgan | 700,000 | 126,000 |
| 1987 | (United States) Davis Love III | 271 | −13 | 1 stroke | (United States) Steve Jones | 650,000 | 117,000 |
Sea Pines Heritage
| 1986 | (United States) Fuzzy Zoeller (2) | 276 | −8 | 1 stroke | (United States) Chip Beck (United States) Roger Maltbie (Australia) Greg Norman | 450,000 | 81,000 |
| 1985 | (West Germany) Bernhard Langer | 273 | −11 | Playoff | (United States) Bobby Wadkins | 400,000 | 72,000 |
| 1984 | (England) Nick Faldo | 270 | −14 | 1 stroke | (United States) Tom Kite | 400,000 | 72,000 |
| 1983 | (United States) Fuzzy Zoeller | 275 | −9 | 2 strokes | (Canada) Jim Nelford | 350,000 | 63,000 |
| 1982 | (United States) Tom Watson (2) | 280 | −4 | Playoff | (United States) Frank Conner | 300,000 | 54,000 |
| 1981 | (United States) Bill Rogers | 278 | −6 | 1 stroke | (Australia) Bruce Devlin (United States) Hale Irwin (United States) Gil Morgan (United States) Craig Stadler | 300,000 | 54,000 |
| 1980 | (United States) Doug Tewell | 280 | −4 | Playoff | (United States) Jerry Pate | 300,000 | 54,000 |
Sea Pines Heritage Classic
| 1979 | (United States) Tom Watson | 270 | −14 | 5 strokes | (United States) Ed Sneed | 300,000 | 54,000 |
Heritage Classic
| 1978 | (United States) Hubert Green (2) | 277 | −7 | 3 strokes | (United States) Hale Irwin | 225,000 | 45,000 |
| 1977 | (Australia) Graham Marsh | 273 | −11 | 1 stroke | (United States) Tom Watson | 225,000 | 45,000 |
Sea Pines Heritage Classic
| 1976 | (United States) Hubert Green | 274 | −10 | 5 strokes | (United States) Jerry McGee | 215,000 | 43,000 |
| 1975 | (United States) Jack Nicklaus | 271 | −13 | 3 strokes | (United States) Tom Weiskopf | 200,000 | 40,000 |
| 1974 | (United States) Johnny Miller (2) | 276 | −8 | 3 strokes | (United States) Gibby Gilbert | 200,000 | 40,000 |
| 1973 | (United States) Hale Irwin (2) | 272 | −12 | 5 strokes | (United States) Jerry Heard (United States) Grier Jones | 150,000 | 30,000 |
| 1972 | (United States) Johnny Miller | 281 | −3 | 1 stroke | (United States) Tom Weiskopf | 125,000 | 25,000 |
| 1971 | (United States) Hale Irwin | 279 | −5 | 1 stroke | (United States) Bob Lunn | 110,000 | 22,000 |
Heritage Golf Classic
| 1970 | (United States) Bob Goalby | 280 | −4 | 4 strokes | (United States) Lanny Wadkins | 100,000 | 20,000 |
| 1969 | (United States) Arnold Palmer | 283 | −1 | 3 strokes | (United States) Richard Crawford (United States) Bert Yancey | 100,000 | 20,000 |

Note: Green highlight indicates scoring records.

== Multiple winners ==
Through 2026, eleven have won this tournament more than once.

- 5 wins
  - Davis Love III: 1987, 1991, 1992, 1998, 2003
- 3 wins
  - Hale Irwin: 1971, 1973, 1994
  - Stewart Cink: 2000, 2004, 2021
- 2 wins
  - Johnny Miller: 1972, 1974
  - Hubert Green: 1976, 1978
  - Tom Watson: 1979, 1982
  - Fuzzy Zoeller: 1983, 1986
  - Payne Stewart: 1989, 1990
  - Boo Weekley: 2007, 2008
  - Jim Furyk: 2010, 2015
  - Matt Fitzpatrick: 2023, 2026

== Highlights ==
- 1969: Arnold Palmer wins the inaugural edition at 283 (–1), three shots ahead of Richard Crawford and Bert Yancey.
- 1971: Future three-time U.S. Open champion, Hale Irwin, makes Heritage his first PGA Tour victory, one stroke ahead of Bob Lunn.
- 1976: Hubert Green wins by five shots over Jerry McGee for his third consecutive win in as many weeks.
- 1980: George Archer sets a PGA Tour record for fewest putts in a 72-hole tournament with 94. The previous mark was 99 set by Bob Menne. Kenny Knox broke Archer's record at the 1989 MCI Heritage Golf Classic.
- 1984: Nick Faldo wins his first PGA Tour event by one shot over Tom Kite. He is the first Englishman to win on United States soil since Tony Jacklin at the 1972 Greater Jacksonville Open.
- 1987: Davis Love III wins by one shot over Steve Jones. Jones led by one shot at the 72nd tee, but made a double bogey after his tee shot went out of bounds.
- 1990: Payne Stewart becomes the first Heritage champion to successfully defend his title, defeating Larry Mize and Steve Jones in a sudden-death playoff.
- 1994: Hale Irwin collects his 20th overall and last PGA Tour win at Harbour Town, two shots ahead of Greg Norman.
- 1998: Davis Love III becomes the first four-time Heritage winner, seven strokes ahead of runner-up Glen Day. The next season, Day won at Harbour Town for his only PGA Tour win.
- 2003: Davis Love III wins his fifth Heritage by defeating Woody Austin in a sudden death playoff. To get in the playoff, Love chipped in from off the green at the 72nd hole.
- 2005: Peter Lonard wins by two shots over Darren Clarke, Jim Furyk, Billy Andrade, and Davis Love III. Clarke was tied for the lead when teeing off on the 72nd hole, but like Steve Jones did in 1987, he hit his tee shot out of bounds and made double bogey. David Frost breaks Mark Calcavecchia's record of 93 putts in a 72-hole tournament by hitting only 92 putts.
- 2007 Boo Weekley chips in on the last two holes for his first ever PGA Tour victory. He wins by one shot over Ernie Els.
- 2010: Jim Furyk defeats Brian Davis in a sudden death playoff. On the first playoff hole, Davis calls a two-shot penalty on himself after he touched a loose impediment in a hazard with his golf club.
- 2013: A PGA Tour record-tying 91 players make the 36-hole cut, (a record set at the 1981 Greater Hartford Open). Jesper Parnevik bogeyed the 18th hole, giving Parnevik and 21 additional golfers entry into the third round.
- 2017: Wesley Bryan earns his first PGA Tour win by one stroke.
- 2024: Scottie Scheffler becomes the first in 39 years to win the RBC Heritage after winning The Masters.
