= Joseph Bacon Fraser =

United States Army general

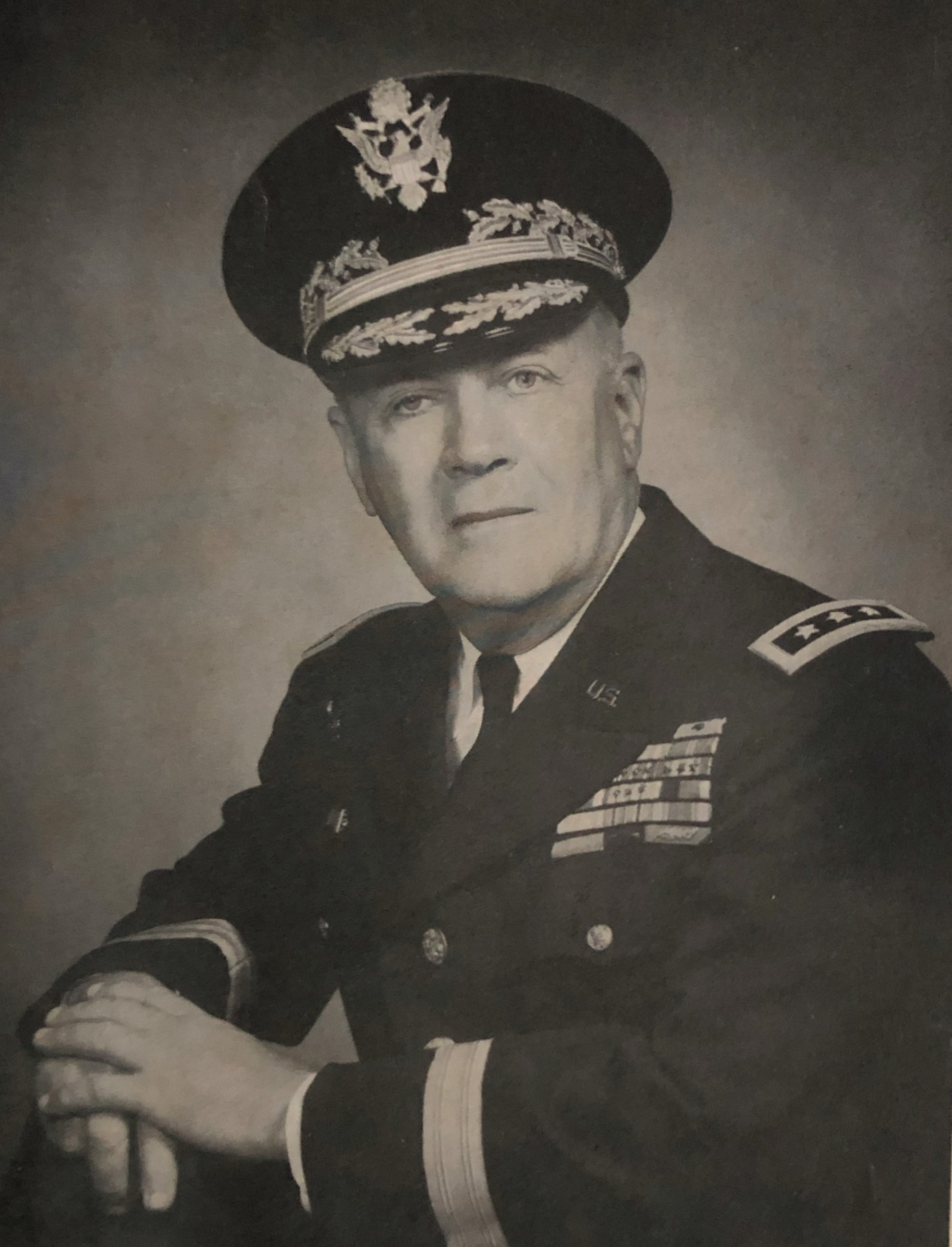
- Fraser in 1956
- Born: Joseph Bacon Fraser Jr. July 15, 1895; Hinesville, Georgia, US
- Died: March 1, 1971 (aged 75)
- Burial place: Flemington Presbyterian Church, Hinesville, Georgia, US
- Spouse: Pearl Collins (m. 1923)
- Children: Joseph Jr.; Charles
- Relatives: West Fraser (grandson)
- Military career
- Branch: Georgia National Guard
- Service years: 1918–1956
- Rank: Lieutenant general
- Commands: 108th Cavalry; 101st Coast Artillery Battalion (Anti-Aircraft); 23rd Anti-Aircraft Group; 108th Anti-Aircraft Brigade; 48th Infantry Division
- Conflicts: World War I; World War II; Battle of Port Moresby; Seine River Crossing at Mantes-Gassicourt; Korean War

Joseph Bacon Fraser (July 15, 1895 – March 1, 1971) commanded the 48th Armored Division of Georgia and Florida Army National Guard. His military career spanned from World War I to the Korean War before retiring a lieutenant general in 1956. He was also a former mayor of Hinesville, a timber baron, and one of the first resort developers of Hilton Head Island, South Carolina, which his son, Charles E. Fraser, developed into Sea Pines Plantation.

== Early years ==
Fraser was born to the Honorable Joseph Bacon Fraser, Sr. and Maria Boulineau Fraser on July 15, 1895. He was preceded by brother Charles W, born October 29, 1886, Sister Mary B., born August 31, 1888, Donald A, born January 10, 1890, Addie W, born October 30, 1891, and Harry B, born September 4, 1893. He had one younger brother, Thomas Layton, born March 16, 1899. His father was a mayor of Hinesville in 1913 and 1915, a stockholder in the Hinesville Bank, a director in the Flemington, Hinesville & Western Railroad, and an owner of considerable real estate.

Joseph B Fraser completed his preparatory studies at Napier Edinburgh in Hinesville. Afterwards, Fraser entered into the University of Georgia at Athens, where he played football, but did not letter, and was a member of the Alpha Tau Omega fraternity.

== Military career ==
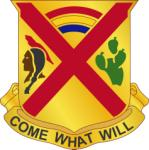
108th Cavalry Regiment Insignia

=== World War I ===
When World War I broke out, Joseph Bacon Fraser and his brother, Donald A. Fraser, enlisted as privates in the U.S. Army. Joseph was commissioned a second lieutenant in July, 1918 and promoted to first lieutenant in March 1919. He was released from federal service in May 1919, but continued his record of military activity in the National Guard. In September 1920, he was commissioned captain of Troop B. Georgia Cavalry where he served under Harry Truman. He was promoted to major in September 1927, and to lieutenant colonel in January, 1935. Becoming a full colonel in June 1936, he was placed in command of the 108th Cavalry.

=== World War II ===
==== Pacific Theater ====
===== Journey to Australia =====
Fraser was ordered to federal active duty as a colonel and sent to Australia in February 1942. He left Boston aboard the RMS Queen Mary, the largest passenger ship at the time, with 10,000 other men and overloaded equipment.

Chaplain Lt. Clarence Letson was one of Fraser's Hinesville companions also on board the ship. Leston wrote in his diary that the ship sailed first to Key West, Florida, then to Rio de Janeiro. They spent two days there, blockaded by an axis submarine but escaped over a shallow bar at high tide. "A zigzag course was then taken to Cape Town, South Africa, during which the ship caught fire three times — all caused, the captain felt, because of the overload on the wiring. They entered the Tasmanian Sea and stopped in Perth, Australia, then disembarked at Sydney and caught trains up through the interior to Brisbane. The following day, Gen. MacArthur arrived."

With Fraser and Lt. Letson were men from Georgia and South Carolina; they composed the major portion of the 101st Coast Artillery Battalion (Anti-Aircraft) which Fraser commanded in the United States Army Coast Artillery Corps Pacific Theater of Operations from 1942 to 1943. The rest of the 10,000 men aboard the Queen Mary were dispersed throughout the Pacific.

Years later, when addressing a group honoring Fraser for his safe return to Hinesville, he said, "When I left Camp Stewart in February 1942, I requested the men under my command to be made up of Georgia men. A number of the men came from Liberty and Long counties. They were among the best in the country and I am indeed grateful in the manner in which they met the enemy on the battlefront and conducted themselves during the perilous trip overseas."

===== Defense of New Guinea =====
After receiving General MacArthur's Orders in Sydney, Fraser and the 101st Battalion were the first American combat ground troops to go into New Guinea during the New Guinea Campaign in 1942.

With the Japanese rapidly overtaking New Guinea and MacArthur's forces regrouping in Australia, MacArthur told Fraser that they would have little chances of surviving but to hold off Japanese forces as long as they could. A diary entry by Lt. Lester on March 30, 1942, shortly before the battalion sailed to Port Moresby, New Guinea reads, "This is it. The Japanese are moving in toward New Guinea.... Into combat. We've been preparing but didn't really believe it would happen. … We can't believe that we're playing for keeps. Col. Joe Fraser and I met and prayed to God last night for guidance and leadership to carry our men through the battles before them. He was crying; his men were going to die. All are willing to go, but what a sinking feeling." (Col. Fraser later told a group in Hinesville that he prayed another hour in his headquarters before leaving for the Jap-infested area).

The battalion sailed unmolested through enemy waters, where they landed safely and fought off repeated air attacks by Japanese Zeros with 50-caliber machine guns over the next few months until the rest of MacArthur's forces returned. Fraser made his gunners frequently relocate the anti-aircraft gun locations so that the Zeros had a hard time determining where to focus each new attack. The 101st played a role in holding what allied territory remained on New Guinea until the Battle of Coral Sea thwarted the Japanese 5-pronged plan of attack on Australia.

Colonel Fraser was 'mentioned in despatches' in Canberra, Australia, on January 13, 1944.

(England), 1944. Colonel Joseph B. Fraser (seated, center) and other military and political figures during wartime

==== European Theater ====
Ordered to the European theater in February 1944, he commanded the 23rd anti-aircraft group there. On August 19–21, the 23rd AAA group protected the 79th infantry division of the XV corps of General Patton's Third Army in making the first allied bridge crossing of the Seine River near Paris. Over two days, the 23rd shot down 43 Axis aircraft.

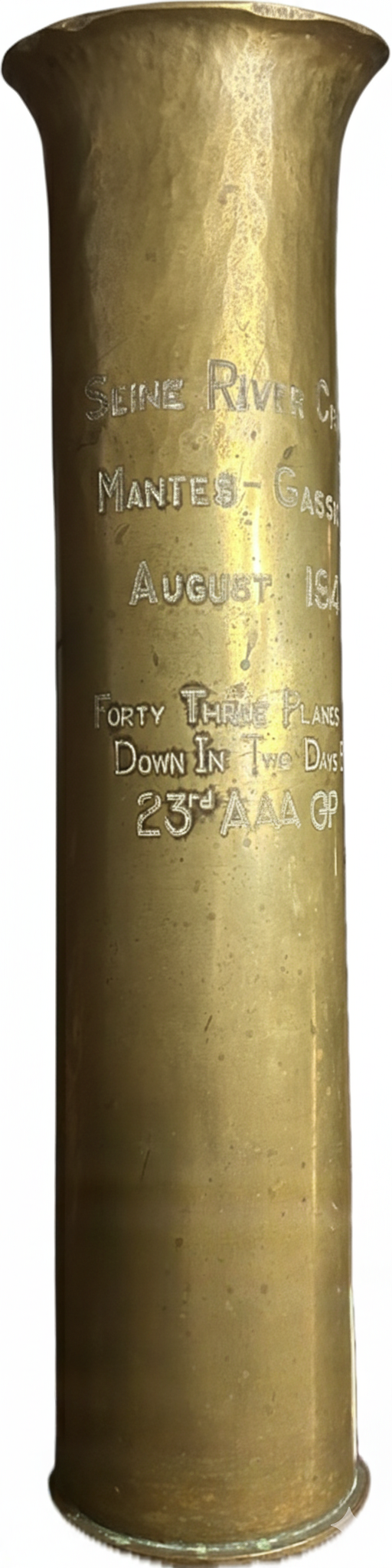
WWII trench art on a captured German 88mm shell casing commemorating the 23rd AAA Group defense of the Seine River crossing at Mantes Gassicourt in August 1944. From the personal collection of Joseph B. Fraser.

Fraser was again released from federal service in December 1945. He returned to duty with the Georgia National Guard, and was promoted to the rank of brigadier general on February 3, 1947, and placed in command of the 108th Anti-Aircraft Brigade, Georgia National Guard, with headquarters at Savannah, Georgia.

=== Korean War ===
Called back into federal service in August, 1950, Fraser was promoted to the rank of major general and commanded the 48th Infantry Division, composed of Georgia and Florida National Guard units.

=== Retirement ===
He was promoted to the rank of lieutenant general when he retired from the Georgia National Guard on August 1, 1956.

== Business career ==
Fraser was president of the Fraser Lumber Company since 1929, and president of the Fraser Supply company since its organization in 1956. When he left for World War II, his son Joe Jr. ran the lumber company. Much of the timber operation at the time was based on cutting naturally seeded forests, rather than forest replanting operation in common practice today. In 1949, in efforts to seek out new properties to timber, he joined a group of lumber associates to buy a total of 20,000 acres of pine forest on Hilton Head Island's southern end for an average of nearly $60 an acre. Gen. Joseph B. Fraser, Fred C. Hack, Olin T. McIntosh, and C.C. Stebbins formed the Hilton Head Company to handle the timber operation. In 1956, Fraser youngest son, Charles E., who had recently graduated from Yale law, bought his father interest in the Hilton Head Company and created the Sea Pines Company. Fraser served as the chairman of the board for the company.

== Personal life ==
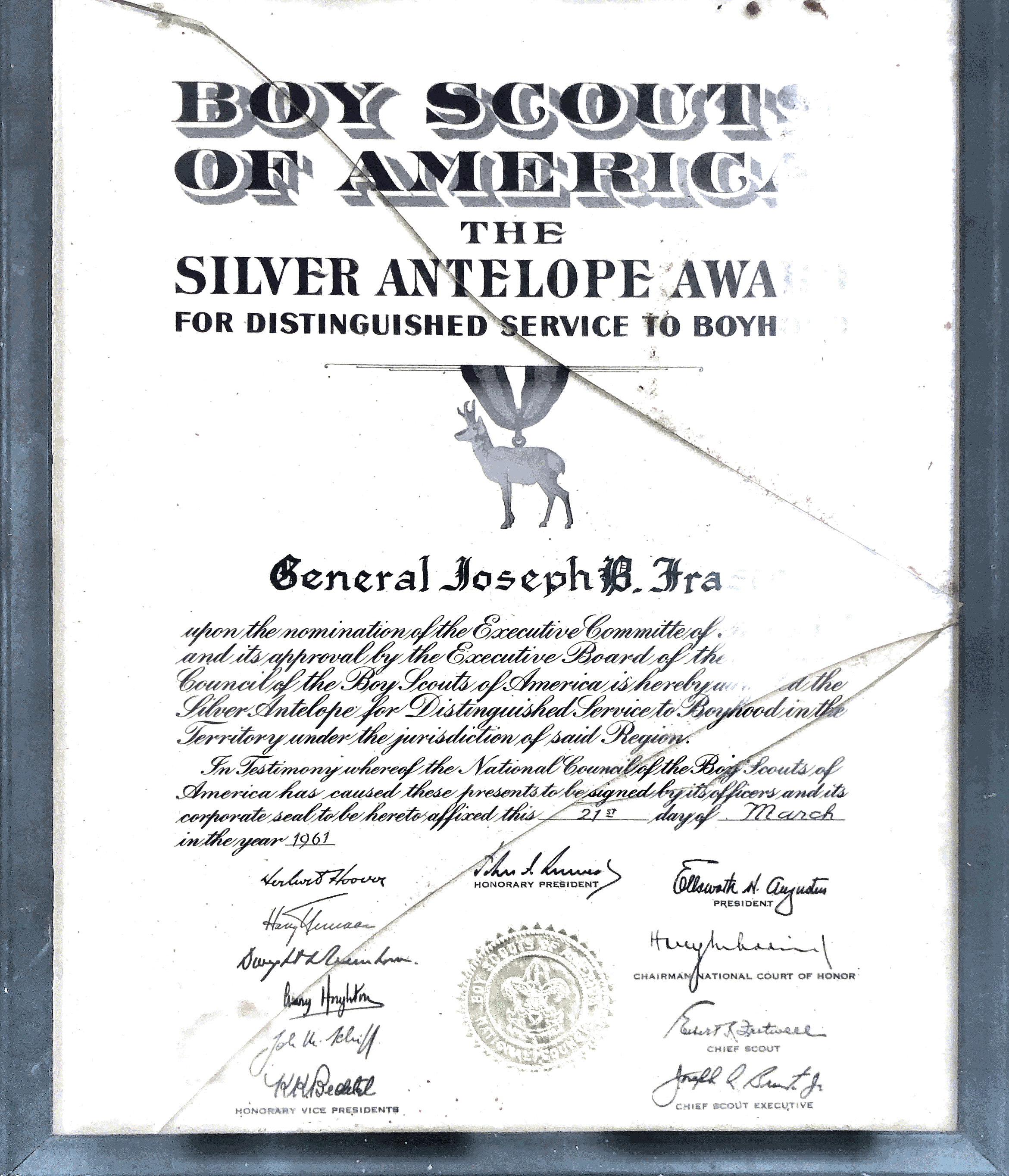
Silver Antelope Award given to Fraser by the Boy Scouts of America in 1961

Robert Groover, author of Sweet Land of Liberty: a History of Liberty County, Georgia, writes, "No one person did more to promote the general welfare of his fellow citizens in Liberty County from 1930 to 1940 than did Joseph B. Fraser Jr. During the worst economic depression America had ever known, he worked tirelessly in the Liberty County Chamber of Commerce and with various state and federal programs to help alleviate the suffering of the people of Liberty County."

Fraser was very active in the Presbyterian Church. He was a communicant of the First Presbyterian Church of Hinesville, where he served as an elder. He was a member of the board of World Missions, Presbyterian Church of the United States, and is past president of the Assembly's Men's Council of the national church organization. In 1949, Fraser served as the chairman of the board of trustees for Presbyterian College in Clinton, South Carolina.

Joseph B. Fraser Jr. was general chairman of a bicentennial celebration of the founding of Midway Church and the Midway Society, which took place at Midway Church on April 24, 1954. U.S. Senator Richard B. Russell was the principal speaker. A pageant titled "A Charge to Keep," written by Josephine Martin and produced by Corrie McDowell Martin, was presented on the lawn in front of the church in the afternoon.

Fraser, like his father, served as Mayor of Hinesville in 1932. He took an active interest in the program of the Boy Scouts of America and was a member of the national council and vice president of region six. He was the council president from 1948 to 1949 prior to his service in the Korean War. In 1980, a donation was made in memoriam Joseph B Fraser to the Boy Scouts that enabled them to build the Coastal Empire Council Headquarters in Savannah, Georgia. His memberships included the Lions Club of Hinesville, of which he was a charter member; the Oglethorpe Club of Savannah; and the Lodge of Free and Accepted Masons. In Masonry, he was a member of the higher bodies of the Scottish Rite.

At Cobbtown Georgia, on November 14, 1923, Joseph B. Fraser married Pearl Collins, daughter of Elbert and Margaret Elizabeth (Davis) Collins. Mr. and Mrs. Fraser had two children, both of whom were born in Hinesville. Joseph Bacon Jr., born January 27, 1926, and Charles Elbert, born June 13, 1929. General Fraser was himself born a junior, but dropped it when his father died and subsequently gave his oldest son the Junior suffix.
