= List of golf courses in the United States =

As of 2019, there were 38,864 golf courses in the world. The United States is the home to approximately 16,000 of those courses as of 2024. The state with the most golf courses in the United States is Florida with over 1,200 courses as of 2024, followed by California with close to 1,000 courses. Alaska has the fewest with 20 and the District of Columbia has five. A study in 2022 found that approximately 75 percent of course are public with the remaining requiring a membership or invitation.

Some of the most notable golf course architects who are credited with designing or contributing significantly to more than 300 courses include Tom Bendelow and Harry Colt and former professional golfers Jack Nicklaus and Arnold Palmer. Robert Trent Jones Golf Trail is named after architect Robert Trent Jones, Sr. and is a collection of courses he designed in the state of Alabama. Men's major golf championships such as the PGA Championship and U.S. Open have been played at various locations, including Newport Country Club, Siwanoy Country Club, and TPC at Sawgrass.

The oldest golf course in the United States is Oakhurst Links in West Virginia. Built in 1884, it was designed with traditional Scottish design elements and eventually closed in 2016 due to flood damage. One of the most iconic golf courses is Augusta National Golf Club which has hosted the Masters Tournament since 1933. It is also home of the Augusta National Women's Amateur.

== Alabama ==
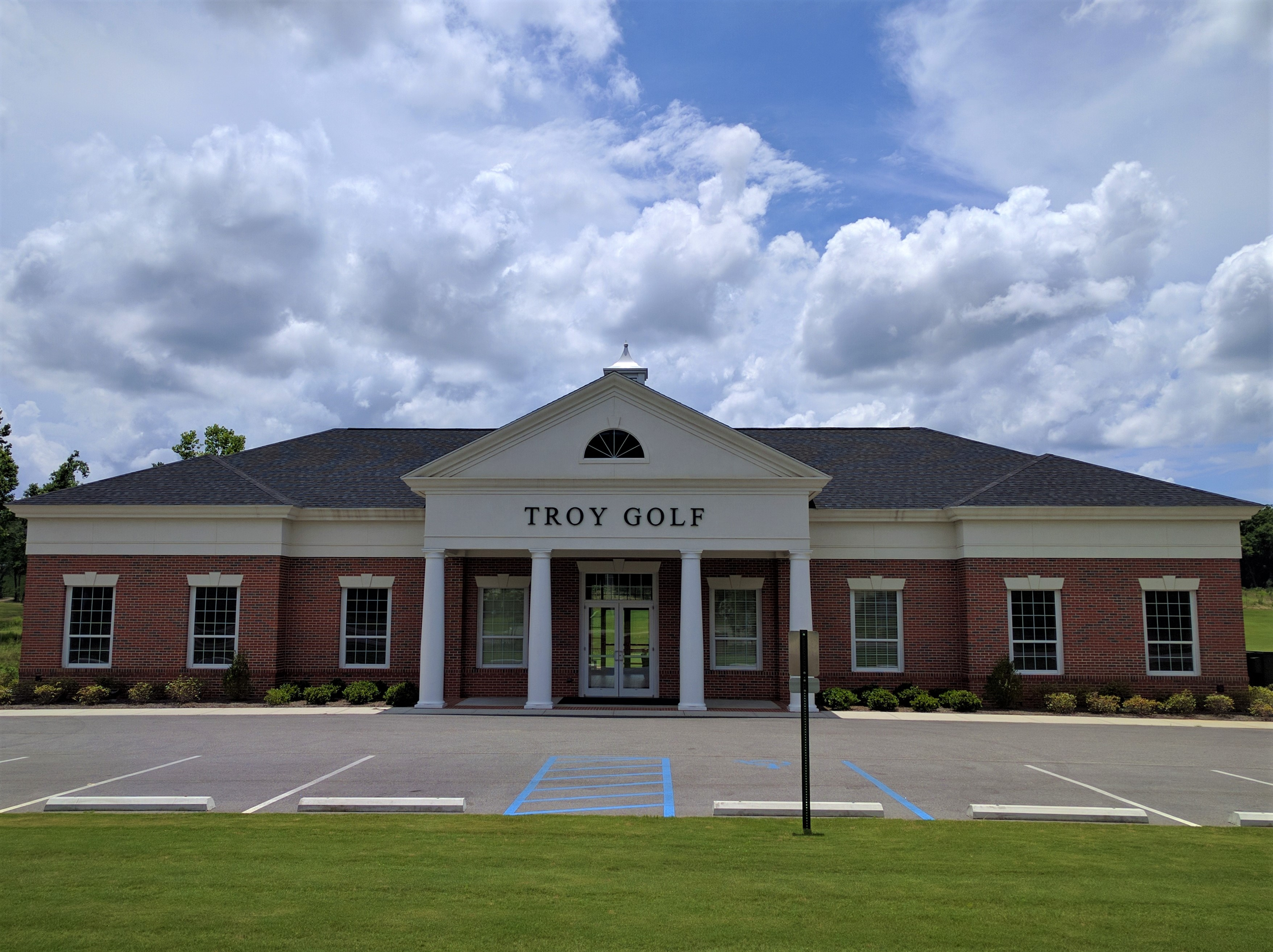
Photo of the Troy Oaks Golf Course clubhouse in Troy, Alabama.

- Birmingham Country Club (Alabama)
- Dothan National Golf Club
- Greystone Golf & Country Club
- Highland Park Golf Course
- Indian Pines Golf Course
- Kiva Dunes
- NorthRiver Yacht Club
- Ol' Colony Golf Complex
- Old Overton Club
- Shoal Creek Club
- Trojan Oaks Golf Course

== Arizona ==
- Arizona Biltmore Country Club
- Camelback Golf Club
- Desert Forest Golf Club
- The Estancia Club
- The Gallery Golf Club
- The Golf Club at Dove Mountain
- Karsten Golf Course
- Oro Valley Country Club
- Phoenix Country Club
- Scottsdale National Golf Club
- TPC Scottsdale
- Troon Country Club

== Arkansas ==
- Blessings Golf Club
- DeGray Lake Resort State Park
- Pinnacle Country Club
- Sylvan Hills Country Club Golf Course

== California ==
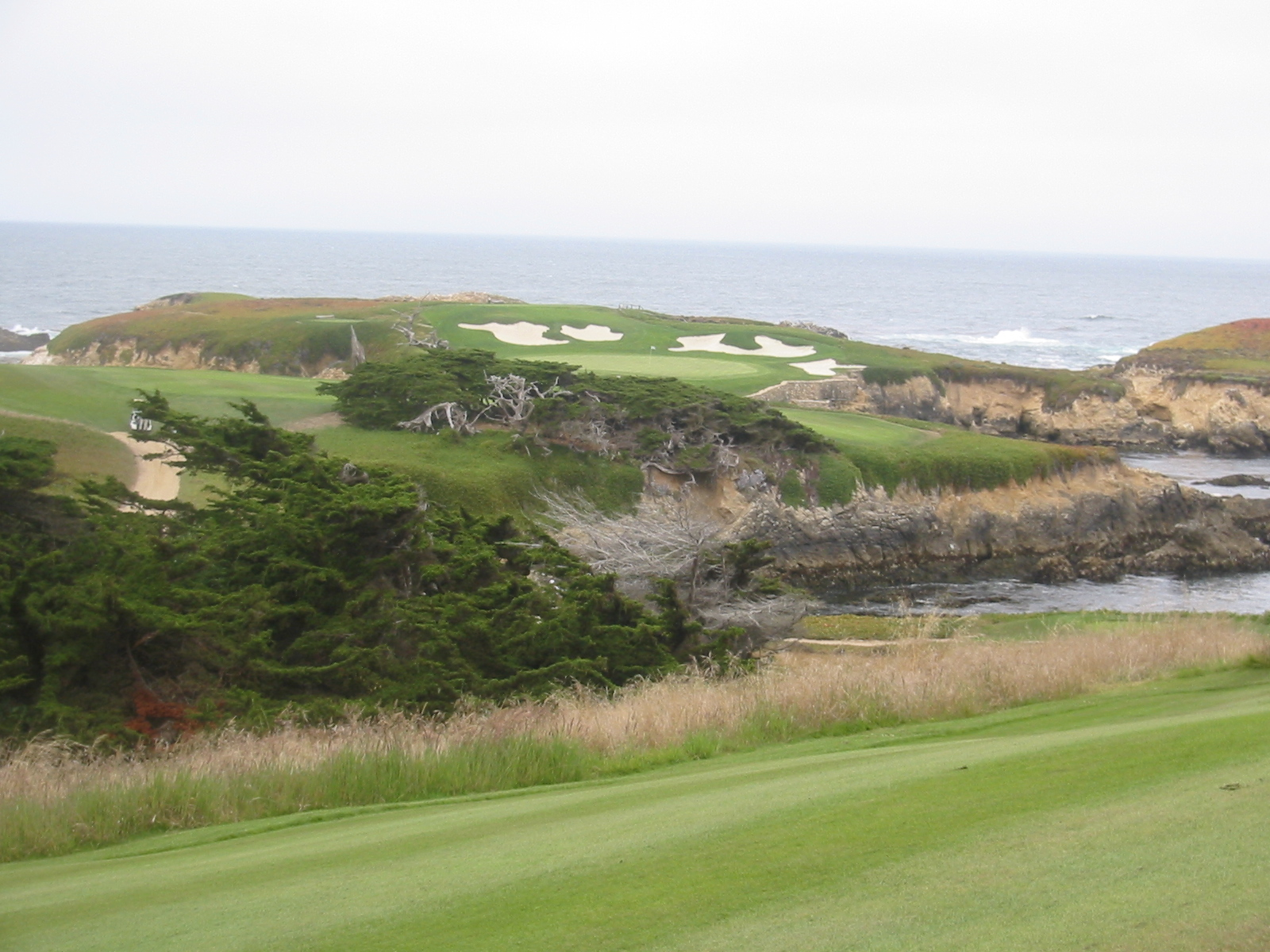
View of 16th green from Cypress Point Club clubhouse in 2004.

- Brookside Golf Course
- CordeValle
- Cypress Point Club
- Cypress Ridge Golf Course
- DeBell Golf Course
- Deep Cliff Golf Course
- Empire Lakes Golf Course
- Fairbanks Ranch Country Club
- Fort Washington Country Club
- Green Hills Country Club
- Industry Hills Golf Club
- La Quinta Resort & Club
- Lake Merced Golf Club
- Lost Canyons Golf Club
- Mission Hills Country Club
- Monterey Peninsula Country Club
- Morley Field Sports Complex
- Olympic Club
- Omni La Costa Resort & Spa
- Pacific Grove Municipal Golf Links
- Palos Verdes Golf Club
- Park Hyatt Resort Aviara
- Pasatiempo Golf Club
- Pebble Beach Golf Links
- PGA West
- Poppy Hills Golf Course
- Primm Valley Golf Club
- San Diego Country Club
- San Francisco Golf Club
- Santa Anita Golf Course
- Sequoyah Country Club
- Sharp Park Golf Course
- Sherwood Country Club
- Silverado Resort and Spa
- Spyglass Hill Golf Course
- Sunnyside Country Club
- Tamarisk Country Club
- Tehàma Golf Club
- Thunderbird Country Club
- Tilden Park Golf Course
- Torrey Pines Golf Course
- TPC Harding Park
- TPC Stonebrae
- Trump National Golf Club, Los Angeles
- Valencia Country Club
- Visalia Country Club
- Westlake Golf Course

== Colorado ==
- Broadmoor Golf Club
- Cherry Hills Country Club
- City Park Golf
- Colorado Golf Club
- Columbine Country Club
- Hiwan Golf Club
- Park Hill Golf Club
- Red Rocks Country Club

== Connecticut ==
- Brooklawn Country Club
- Gillette Ridge Golf Club
- Keney Park Golf Course
- Morefar Back O'Beyond
- New Haven Country Club
- Norfolk Country Club
- Shennecossett Golf Course
- Sunset Hill Golf Club
- TPC River Highlands
- Wampanoag Country Club
- Yale Golf Course

== Delaware ==
- Baywood Greens

== Florida ==
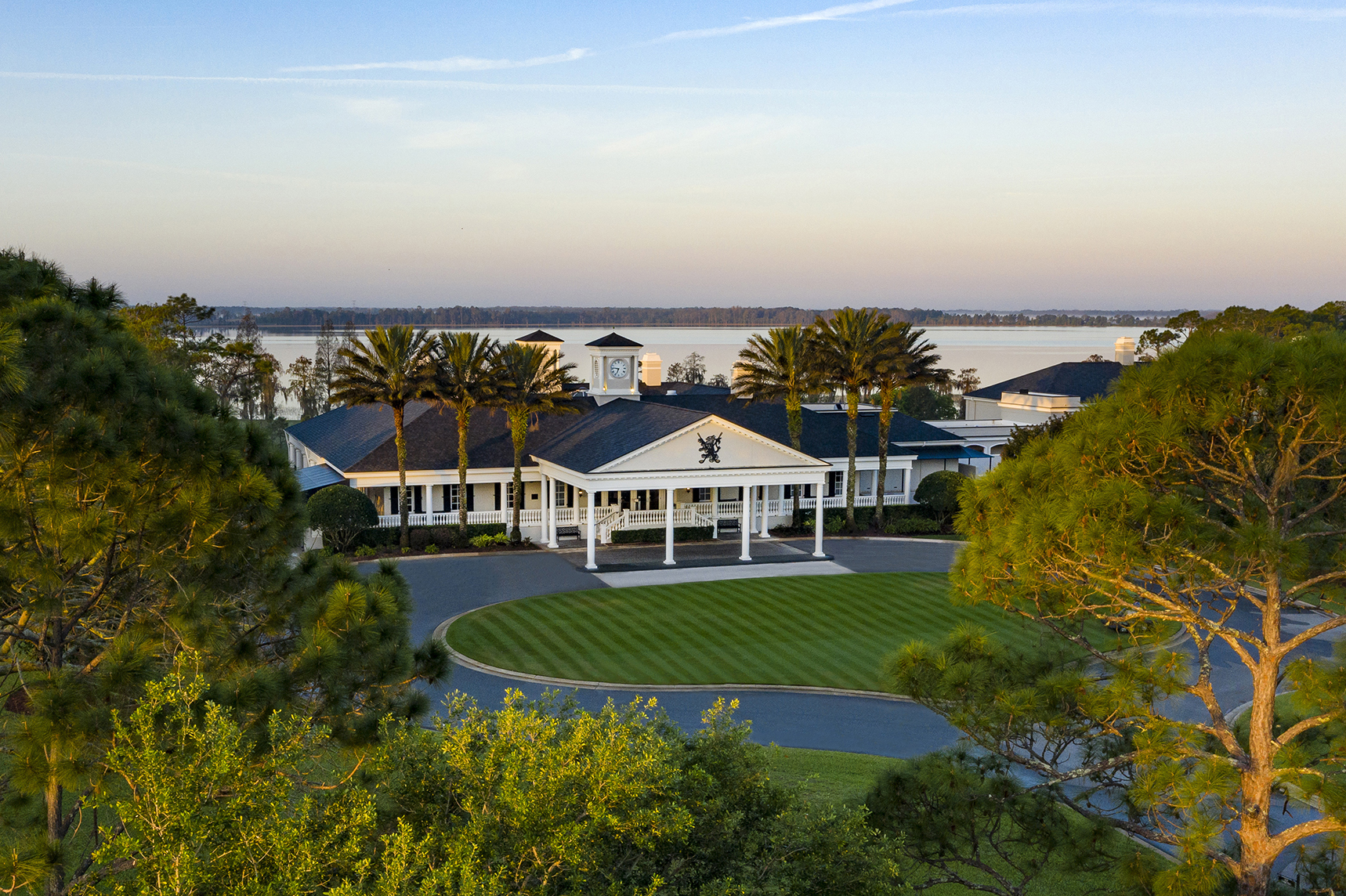
Lake Nona Golf & Country Club in Orlando, Florida.

- Apollo Beach Golf & Sea Club
- Bay Hill Club and Lodge
- Brooksville Golf and Country Club
- Deerwood Country Club
- Don Veller Seminole Golf
- Eagle Creek Golf Club
- Hayt Golf Learning Center
- Hole-in-the-Wall Golf Club
- Innisbrook Resort and Golf Club
- Inverrary Country Club
- Lake Nona Golf & Country Club
- Mark Bostick Golf Course
- Medalist Golf Club
- Mystic Dunes Resort & Golf Club
- Old Palm Golf Club
- Orange County National Golf Center
- Palatka Golf Club
- PGA National Champion Course
- PGA National Resort
- Pine Tree Golf Club
- Ponte Vedra Inn and Club
- Rio Pinar Country Club
- Rocky Point Golf Course
- Rogers Park
- Rosen Shingle Creek
- Sawgrass Country Club
- Seminole Golf Club
- Streamsong
- Stuart Yacht & Country Club
- Renaissance Resort at World Golf Village
- Rio Pinar Country Club
- Temple Terrace Golf and Country Club
- The Boca Raton Resort
- Tiburón Golf Club
- Timuquana Country Club
- TPC at Sawgrass
- Eagle Trace Golf Club
- TPC Prestancia
- TPC Tampa Bay
- TPC Treviso Bay
- Trump International Golf Club (West Palm Beach)
- Trump National Doral Miami
- Trump National Golf Club Jupiter
- White Oak Conservation
- Winter Park Country Club and Golf Course
- World Golf Village
- World Woods Golf Club

== Georgia ==
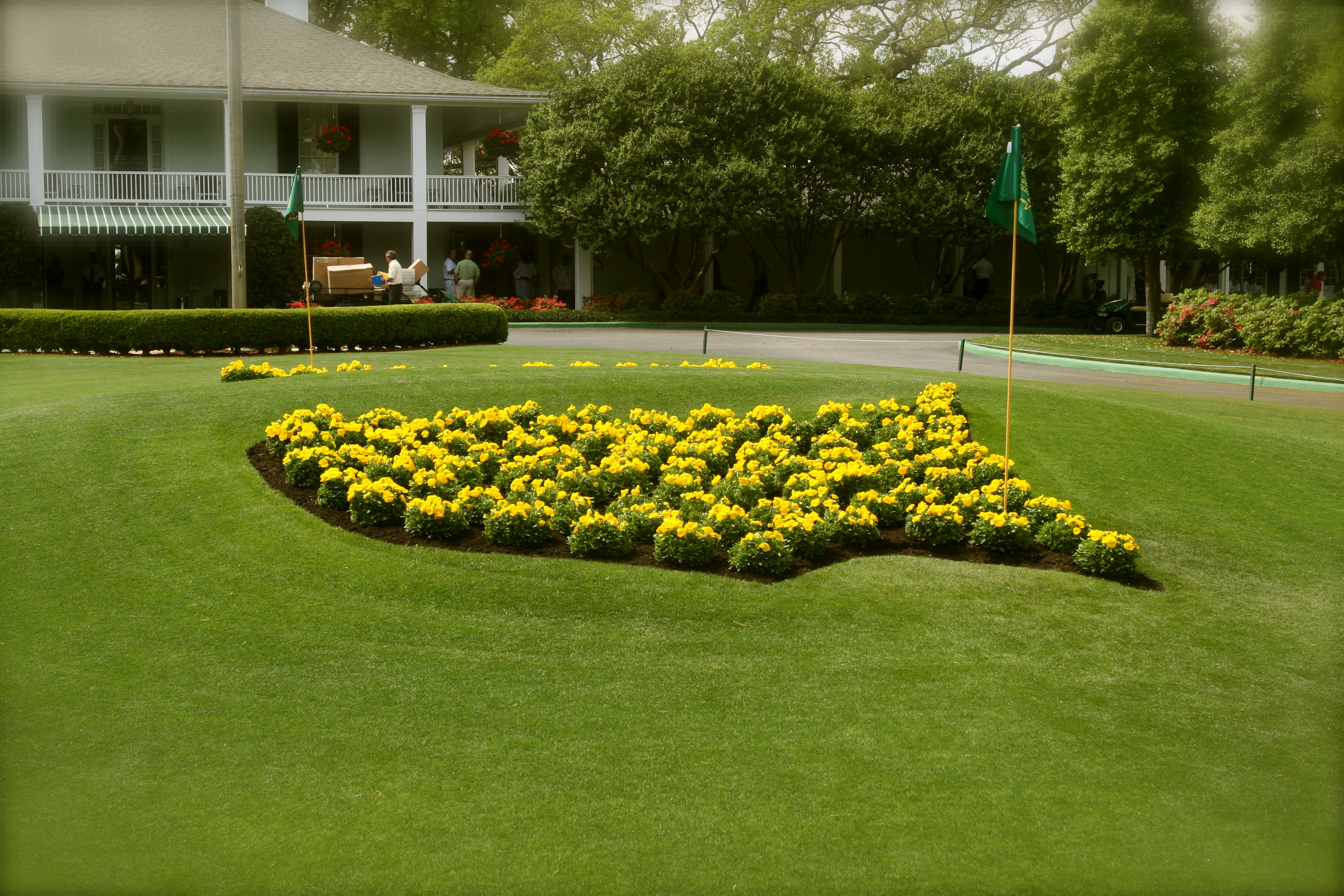
The clubhouse and The Masters logo at Augusta National Golf Club.

- Atlanta Athletic Club
- Atlanta Country Club
- Augusta Country Club
- Augusta National Golf Club
- Bowden Golf Course
- Callaway Gardens
- Champions Retreat Golf Club
- Charlie Yates Golf Course
- Druid Hills Golf Club
- East Lake Golf Club
- Forest Hills Golf Club
- Jekyll Island Club
- Piedmont Driving Club
- RiverPines Golf
- Stonebridge Golf Club
- TPC Sugarloaf

== Hawaii ==
- Four Seasons Resort Hualalai
- Four Seasons Resort Maui
- Kapalua Resort
- Ko Olina Resort
- Makena Beach & Golf Resort
- The Ritz-Carlton Oʻahu, Turtle Bay
- Waialae Country Club

== Idaho ==
- Circling Raven Golf Club
- Coeur d'Alene Resort
- Hillcrest Country Club
- Osprey Meadows Golf Course
- Sun Valley Golf Course
- University of Idaho Golf Course

== Illinois ==
- Aurora Country Club
- Bolingbrook Golf Club
- Butler National Golf Club
- Canal Shores Golf Course
- Cantigny Golf Club
- Cantigny Park
- Chicago Golf Club
- Cog Hill Golf & Country Club
- Conway Farms Golf Club
- Flossmoor Country Club
- Glen Oak Country Club
- Glen View Club
- Harrison Park Golf Course
- Kemper Lakes Golf Club
- La Grange Country Club
- Medinah Country Club
- Merit Club
- Midlothian Country Club
- North Shore Country Club
- Olympia Fields Country Club
- Onwentsia Club
- Pottawatomie Park
- Quail Meadows Golf Course
- Ravisloe Country Club
- Rich Harvest Farms
- Ridgemoor Country Club
- Riverside Golf Club
- Rolling Green Country Club
- Skokie Country Club
- Sunset Ridge Country Club
- Tam O'Shanter Golf Course
- TPC Deere Run
- Village Links of Glen Ellyn
- Wing Park Golf Course

== Indiana ==
- Brickyard Crossing Golf Course
- Crooked Stick Golf Club
- Forest Hills Country Club
- Hillcrest Country Club
- Kokomo Country Club
- Sycamore Hills Golf Club
- Victoria National Golf Course
- Warren Golf Course

== Iowa ==
- Blue Top Ridge Golf Course
- Bos Landen
- Des Moines Golf and Country Club
- Glenwood Golf Course
- Veenker Memorial Golf Course

== Kansas ==
- Colbert Hills
- Indian Hills Country Club
- Kansas City Country Club
- Mission Hills Country Club
- Prairie Dunes Country Club
- Sand Creek Station Golf Course

== Kentucky ==
- Big Spring Country Club
- Kenton County Golf Course
- Paintsville Country Club
- Stearns Golf Course
- University Club of Kentucky
- Valhalla Golf Club

== Louisiana ==
- Atchafalaya Golf Course at Idlewild
- City Park Golf Course
- City Park Golf Courses (New Orleans)
- Le Triomphe Golf Club
- Squire Creek Country Club
- University Club of Baton Rouge

== Maine ==
- Aroostook Valley Country Club
- Cape Arundel Golf Club
- Great Chebeague Golf Club
- Megunticook Golf Club
- Nonesuch River Golf Course
- Penobscot Valley Country Club
- Riverside Municipal Golf Course
- Sunday River Golf Club

== Maryland ==
- Baltimore Country Club
- Bulle Rock Golf Course
- Burning Tree Club
- Caves Valley Golf Club
- Columbia Country Club
- Congressional Country Club
- Country Club at Woodmore
- Four Streams
- TPC Potomac at Avenel Farm
- University of Maryland Golf Course
- The Woodlands Golf Course

== Massachusetts ==
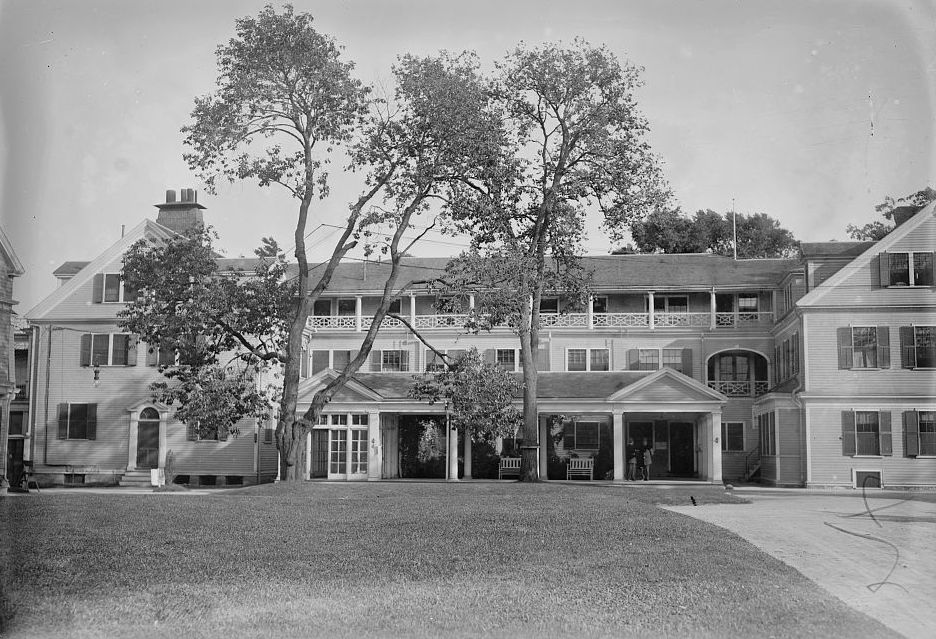
The Country Club in Brookline, Massachusetts in the early 1900s.

- Blue Hill Country Club
- Brae Burn Country Club
- The Country Club
- D.W. Field Park
- Farm Neck Golf Club
- Ferncroft Country Club
- Forest Park Country Club
- Framingham Country Club
- George Wright Golf Course
- Hyannisport Club
- Marlborough Country Club
- Miacomet Golf Course
- Mount Hood Golf Club
- Myopia Hunt Club
- Newton Commonwealth Golf Course
- Oakley Country Club
- Pleasant Valley Country Club
- Sankaty Head Golf Club
- Siasconset Golf Club
- Taconic Golf Club
- The International (golf course)
- Thorny Lea Golf Club
- TPC Boston
- Vesper Country Club
- Vineyard Golf Club
- Wianno Club
- William J. Devine Memorial Golf Course
- Worcester Country Club

== Michigan ==
- Arcadia Bluffs Golf Course
- Belvedere Club
- Birmingham Country Club (Michigan)
- Blythefield Country Club
- Country Club of Detroit
- Crystal Downs Country Club, Michigan
- Dearborn Hills
- Detroit Golf Club
- Eagle Crest Resort
- Forest Akers Golf Courses
- Garland Lodge and Resort
- The Golf Club at Harbor Shores
- Grand Haven Golf Club
- Indianwood Golf and Country Club
- Keweenaw Mountain Lodge and Golf Course Complex
- Kingsley Club
- Meadowbrook Country Club
- The Meadows at Grand Valley State University
- Midland Country Club
- Muskegon Country Club
- Oakland Hills Country Club
- Plum Hollow Country Club
- Point O'Woods Golf & Country Club
- Rackham Golf Course
- TPC Michigan
- Travis Pointe Country Club
- Treetops Resort
- Warwick Hills Golf and Country Club
- Wawashkamo Golf Club

== Minnesota ==
- Braemar Golf Course
- Grand View Lodge
- Hazeltine National Golf Club
- Hiawatha Golf Course
- Interlachen Country Club
- Keller Golf Course
- Les Bolstad Golf Course
- Lester Park Golf Course
- The Minikahda Club
- Minneapolis Golf Club
- North Oaks Golf Club
- Northland Country Club
- Ridgeview Country Club
- Somerby Golf Club and Community
- Tanners Brook Golf Club
- Town & Country Club (Saint Paul, Minnesota)
- TPC Twin Cities

== Mississippi ==
- Great Southern Golf Club
- Old Waverly Golf Club
- Reunion Golf and Country Club

== Missouri ==
- Algonquin Golf Club
- Bellerive Country Club
- Boone Valley Golf Club
- Forest Park Golf Course
- Glen Echo Country Club
- Kansas City Country Club
- Mozingo Lake Golf Course
- National Golf Club of Kansas City
- Normandie Golf Club
- Norwood Hills Country Club
- Old Warson Country Club
- Ruth Park Golf Course
- St. Louis Country Club
- Sunset Country Club
- Swope Memorial Golf Course
- Westwood Country Club

== Montana ==
- Buffalo Hill Golf Club
- Fairmont Hot Springs Resort

== Nebraska ==
- Omaha Country Club
- Sand Hills Golf Club

== Nevada ==
- Canyon Gate Country Club
- Edgewood Tahoe Resort
- Las Vegas Country Club
- Reflection Bay Golf Club
- Rio Secco Golf Club
- Shadow Creek Golf Course
- Southern Highlands Golf Club
- TPC at Summerlin
- TPC Las Vegas

== New Hampshire ==
- The Balsams Grand Resort Hotel
- Hanover Country Club
- Mountain View House
- Wentworth by the Sea

== New Jersey ==
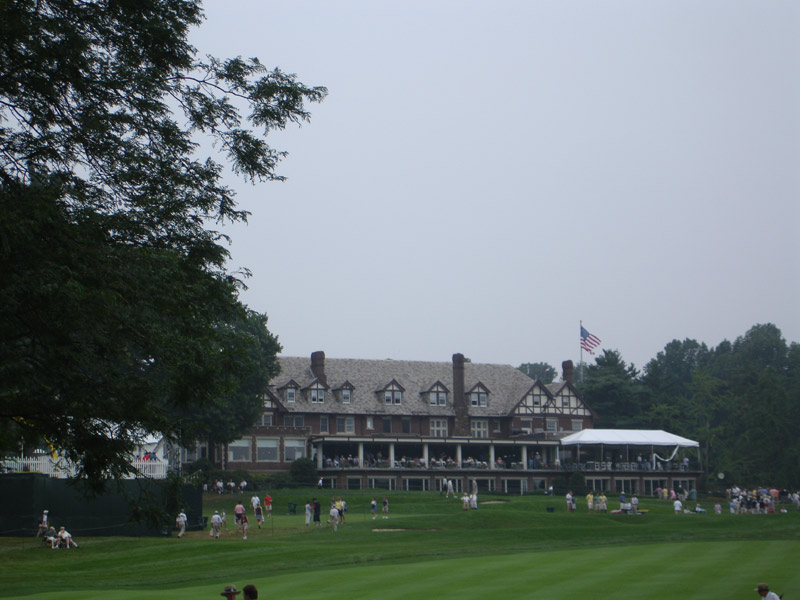
The clubhouse at Baltusrol Golf Club during the 2005 PGA Championship.

- Atlantic City Country Club
- Baltusrol Golf Club
- Canoe Brook Country Club
- Echo Lake Country Club
- Englewood Golf Club
- Essex County Country Club
- Fiddler's Elbow Country Club
- Forsgate Country Club
- Galloping Hill Golf Course
- Hominy Hill Golf Course
- Howell Park Golf Course
- Kresson Golf Course
- Liberty National Golf Club
- Metedeconk National Golf Club
- Morris County Golf Club
- Norwood Country Club
- Panther Valley Country Club
- Pine Valley Golf Club
- Plainfield Country Club
- Preakness Valley
- Ridgewood Country Club
- Scotland Run Golf Club
- Seaview
- Shackamaxon Country Club
- Shady Rest Country Club
- Suburban Golf Club
- Tavistock Country Club
- Trump National Golf Club Bedminster
- Trump National Golf Club Colts Neck
- Trump National Golf Club Philadelphia
- Upper Montclair Country Club
- Weequahic Golf Course
- White Beeches Country Club
- Woodbury Country Club

== New Mexico ==
- Ladera Golf Course
- New Mexico State University Golf Course

== New York ==
- Ardsley Country Club
- Battle Island State Park
- Beaver Island State Park
- Bethpage Black Course
- Bethpage State Park
- Bonavista State Park Golf Course
- Burnet Park
- Cantiague Park
- Chenango Valley State Park
- Cherry Creek Golf Links
- Cloverbank Country Club
- Country Club of Rochester
- Deepdale Golf Club
- Delaware Park–Front Park System
- Dinsmore Golf Course
- Douglaston Park
- Dyker Beach Park and Golf Course
- Eisenhower Park
- Engineers Country Club
- Fishers Island Club
- Fresh Meadow Country Club
- Garden City Golf Club
- Genesee Valley Golf Course
- Governors Island Golf Course
- Green Lakes State Park
- Grossinger's Resort
- Grover Cleveland Golf Course
- Hyde Park Golf Club
- Inwood Country Club
- Kutsher's Hotel
- La Tourette Golf Course
- Lake Placid Club
- Lido Golf Club
- Locust Hill Country Club
- Maidstone Club
- Mark Twain Golf Course
- Mark Twain State Park and Soaring Eagles Golf Course
- McGregor Links
- Meadow Brook Golf Club
- Monroe Golf Club
- Montauk Downs State Park
- Morefar Back O'Beyond
- Mosholu Golf Course
- National Golf Links of America
- Nevele Grand Hotel
- New Course at Albany
- Niagara Falls Country Club
- North Hempstead Country Club
- North Hills Country Club
- North Shore Towers
- Oak Hill Country Club
- Oakland Golf Club
- Paramount Country Club
- The Park Country Club
- Pelham Country Club
- Pinnacle State Park and Golf Course
- Piping Rock Club
- Pomonok Country Club
- Pound Ridge Golf Club
- Powelton Club
- Quaker Ridge Golf Club
- Richmond County Country Club
- Robert Trent Jones Golf Course
- Rockaway Hunting Club
- Rockland Country Club
- Rockland Lake State Park
- Rockwood Hall
- Rye Golf Club (Rye, New York)
- Sag Harbor State Golf Course
- Saint Andrew's Golf Club (New York)
- Scarsdale Golf Club
- Seawane Country Club
- Sebonack Golf Club
- Shinnecock Hills Golf Club
- Siwanoy Country Club
- Sleepy Hollow Country Club
- Sodus Bay Heights Golf Club
- St. Lawrence State Park Golf Course
- Sunken Meadow State Park
- The Apawamis Club
- Trump National Golf Club Westchester
- Turning Stone Resort Casino
- Tuxedo Club
- Van Cortlandt Golf Course
- Van Cortlandt Park
- Villa Roma
- Village Club of Sands Point
- Westchester Country Club
- Wheatley Hills Golf Club
- The Whippoorwill Club
- Winged Foot Golf Club
- Wykagyl Country Club

== North Carolina ==
- Carolina Country Club
- Country Club at Wakefield Plantation
- Country Club of North Carolina
- Deep Springs Plantation
- Finley Golf Course
- Forest Oaks Country Club
- High Hampton Inn Historic District
- High Meadows Country Club
- Indian Valley Municipal Golf Course
- Keith Hills Country Club
- Lonnie Poole Golf Course
- North Ridge Country Club
- Oak Island Golf Club
- Pine Needles Lodge and Golf Club
- Pinehurst Resort
- Prestonwood Country Club
- Quail Hollow Club
- Sedgefield Country Club
- Tanglewood Park
- The Omni Grove Park Inn
- TPC at Piper Glen
- Tryon Country Club

== Ohio ==
- Avon Fields Golf Course
- Beechmont Country Club
- Blacklick Woods Metro Park
- Canterbury Golf Club
- Clearview Golf Club
- Columbus Country Club
- Firestone Country Club
- Highland Meadows Golf Club
- Inverness Club
- Losantiville Country Club
- Miami Valley Golf Club
- Moraine Country Club
- Muirfield Village
- NCR Country Club
- NCR Country Club
- Sand Ridge Golf Club
- Scioto Country Club
- Stonewater Golf Course
- Tanglewood National Golf Club
- TPC River's Bend

== Oklahoma ==
- Cedar Creek Golf Course at Beavers Bend
- Dornick Hills Golf & Country Club
- Karsten Creek
- Lakeside Memorial Golf Course
- Oak Tree National
- Oklahoma City Golf & Country Club
- Quail Creek Golf & Country Club
- Southern Hills Country Club
- Twin Hills Golf & Country Club

== Oregon ==
- Bandon Dunes Golf Resort
- Columbia Edgewater Country Club
- Crosswater Club
- Eagle Crest Resort
- Eastmoreland Golf Course
- Emerald Valley Golf Club
- Gearhart Golf Links
- Meriwether National Golf Club
- OGA Golf Course
- Portland Golf Club
- Pumpkin Ridge Golf Club
- The Reserve Vineyards and Golf Club
- Sandpines Golf Links
- Springfield Golf Club
- Waverley Country Club

== Pennsylvania ==
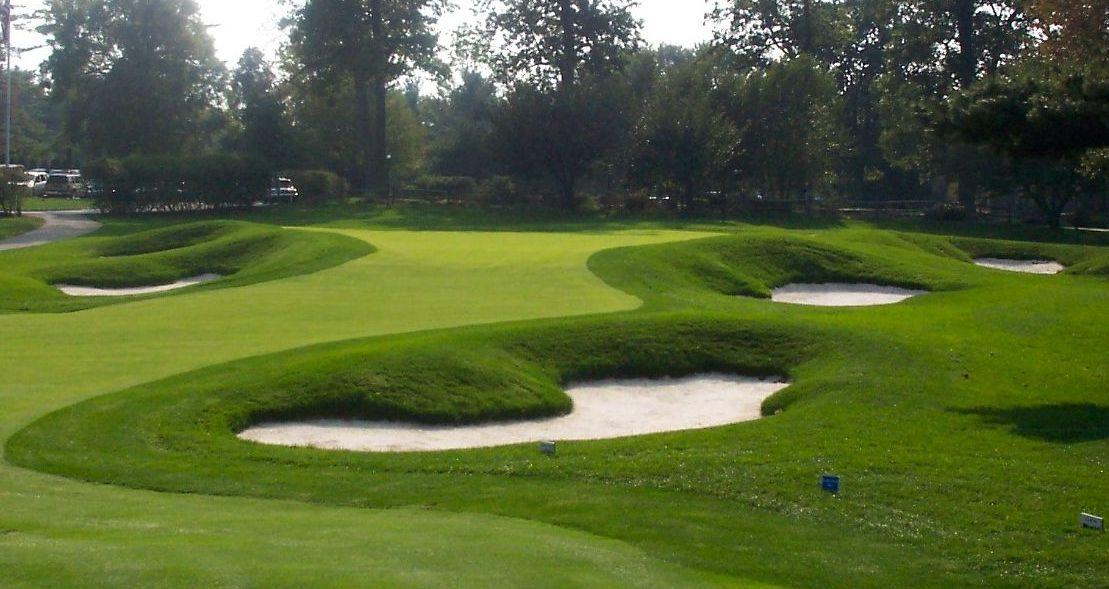
the 18th green at Bluestone Country Club in Blue Bell, Pennsylvania.

- Applebrook Golf Club
- Aronimink Golf Club
- Bluestone Country Club
- Bob O'Connor Golf Course at Schenley Park
- Broad Run Golfer's Club
- Buhl Farm Golf Course
- Butler's Golf Course
- Club at Nevillewood
- Cobbs Creek Golf Course
- Downingtown Country Club
- Edgewood Country Club
- Hershey Country Club
- Huntingdon Valley Country Club
- Kahkwa Country Club
- Lancaster Country Club
- Latrobe Country Club
- Laurel Valley Golf Club
- Llanerch Country Club
- Merion Golf Club
- Monterey Country Club
- Mystic Rock
- Oakmont Country Club
- Penn State Golf Courses
- Philadelphia Country Club
- Philadelphia Cricket Club
- Pittsburgh Field Club
- Reading Country Club
- Rolling Green Golf Club
- Rolling Rock Club
- Saucon Valley Country Club
- Shawnee Inn & Golf Resort
- Talamore Country Club
- Tam O'Shanter Golf Course

== Rhode Island ==
- Metacomet Country Club
- Newport Country Club
- Rhode Island Country Club
- Wannamoisett Country Club

== South Carolina ==
- Callawassie Island
- Congaree Golf Club
- Haig Point Club
- Harbour Town Golf Links
- Kiawah Island Golf Resort
- Ocean Forest Country Club
- Pineland Country Club
- Regent Park-Carolinas
- TPC of Myrtle Beach
- Walker Golf Course
- Wild Dunes
- Yeamans Hall Club

== South Dakota ==
- Tomahawk Lake Country Club

== Tennessee ==
- Colonial Country Club (Memphis)
- Golf Club of Tennessee
- Holston Hills Country Club
- Honors Course
- Lambert Acres Course
- RedTail Mountain Resort
- Ross Creek Landing
- TPC Southwind

== Texas ==
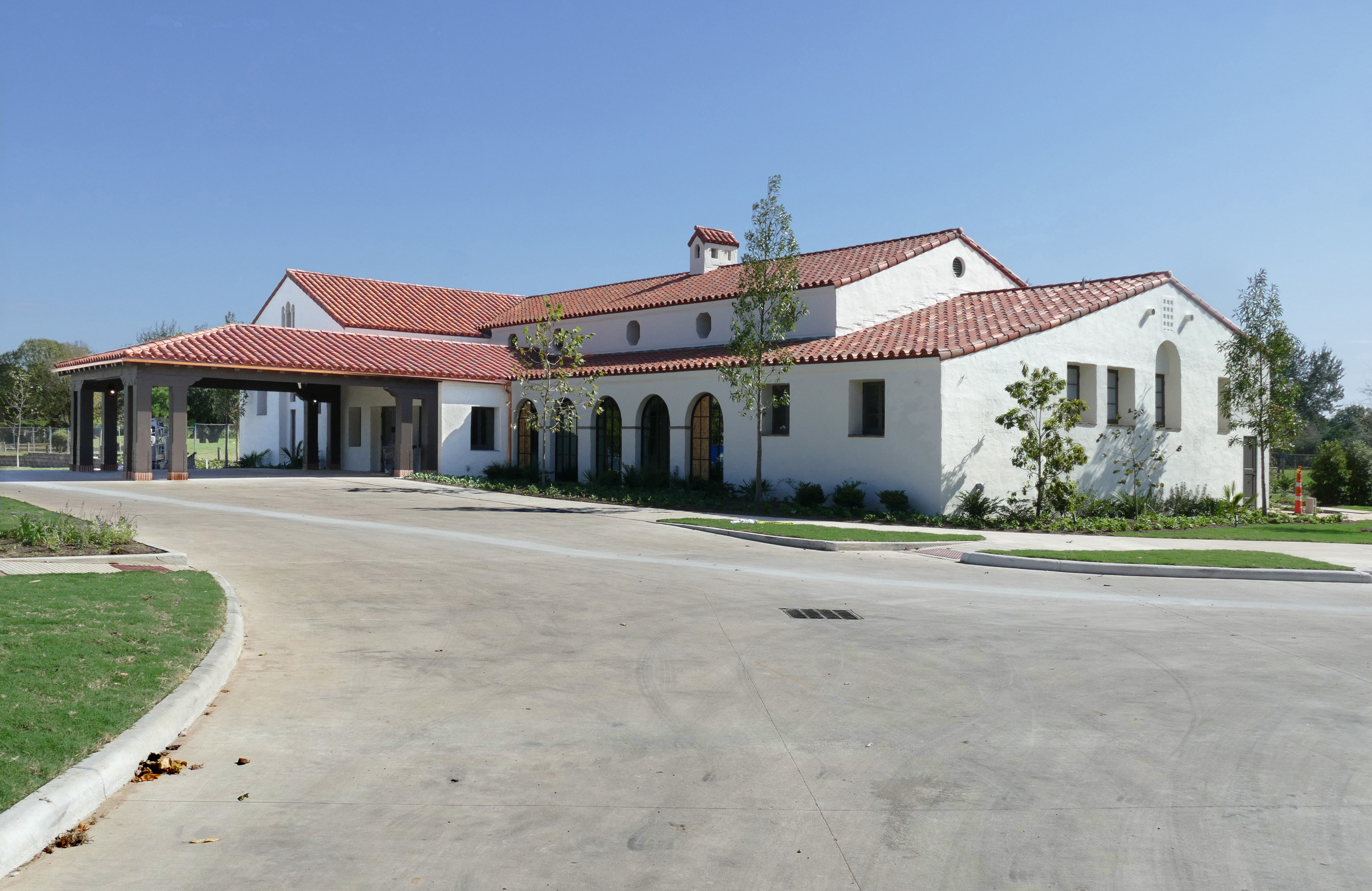
The clubhouse at Hermann Park Golf Course in Hermann Park, Texas.

- Alice Municipal Golf Course
- Austin Country Club
- Brackenridge Park Golf Course
- Brook Hollow Golf Club
- Cedar Crest Park
- Champions Golf Club
- Colonial Country Club (Fort Worth)
- Dallas Athletic Club
- Dallas Country Club
- Firewheel Golf Park
- Golf Club of Houston
- Hermann Park Golf Course
- Holly Lake Ranch, Texas
- La Cantera Golf Club
- Lakewood Country Club
- Lions Municipal Golf Course
- Northwood Club
- Oak Hills Country Club
- Old American Golf Club
- Onion Creek Club
- Pecan Valley Golf Club
- Pedernales Country Club
- The Rawls Course
- River Oaks Country Club
- Royal Oaks Country Club
- Stevens Park Golf Course
- Sweetwater Country Club
- TPC Craig Ranch
- TPC San Antonio
- Trinity Forest Golf Club
- The Woodlands Country Club

== Utah ==
- The Hideout Golf Club
- Oakridge Country Club
- Red Ledges

== Vermont ==
- Ekwanok Country Club

== Virginia ==
- Hermitage Country Club
- Kingsmill Resort
- Kinloch Golf Club
- Meadowbrook Country Club
- The Omni Homestead Resort
- Robert Trent Jones Golf Club
- Smithfield Plantation
- The Country Club of Virginia
- Trump National Golf Club Washington, D.C.

== Washington ==
- Broadmoor Golf Club
- Chambers Bay
- The Club at Snoqualmie Ridge
- The Home Course
- Inglewood Golf Club
- Jackson Park
- Jefferson Park
- Manito Golf and Country Club
- Palouse Ridge Golf Club
- Sahalee Country Club
- Seattle Golf Club
- Semiahmoo Resort
- Tacoma Country and Golf Club

== West Virginia ==
- Cacapon Resort State Park
- Canaan Valley Resort State Park
- Capon Springs Resort
- The Greenbrier
- Hawks Nest State Park
- Oakhurst Links
- Oakland Hall
- Oglebay Park
- Opequon Golf Club
- Pence Springs Hotel Historic District
- Pete Dye Golf Club
- Pipestem Resort State Park
- Snowshoe Mountain
- Stonewall Jackson Lake State Park
- Stratford Springs
- Twin Falls Resort State Park
- Wheeling Park

== Wisconsin ==
- Barker Lake Golf Course
- Big Fish Golf Club
- Blackwolf Run
- Blue Mound Golf & Country Club
- Brown Deer Park Golf Course
- The Bull at Pinehurst Farms
- Eagle Springs Golf Resort
- Erin Hills
- Geneva National Golf Club
- Green Bay Country Club
- Janesville Country Club
- Lawsonia
- Milwaukee Country Club
- Nemadji Golf Course
- Sand Valley Golf Resort
- The Bog
- The Oaks Golf Course
- Trappers Turn Golf Club
- Oneida Golf and Country Club
- University Ridge Golf Course
- Washington Park Clubhouse
- Whistling Straits

== Wyoming ==
- Grand Targhee Resort

== District of Columbia ==
- East Potomac Park Golf Course
- Langston Golf Course
- Rock Creek Park Golf Course

== United States territories ==
- Club Deportivo del Oeste (Puerto Rico)
- Paradisus Puerto Rico (Puerto Rico)

== See also ==
- List of golf course architects
- List of golf courses in the United Kingdom
- List of golf courses in Sweden
- List of golf courses in the Philippines
- List of golf courses in South Africa
- List of golf courses in Norway
