= Four Streams =

American golf club

Four Streams is a private golf club built on a former farm in Beallsville, Maryland. It has received recognition as one of the best golf courses in the Washington, D.C., area.

Set in the country side of northwestern Montgomery County, Maryland, Four Streams is a par 71 course that can play between the yardages 7,102 and 6,033. In June 2014, The Members Club of Four Streams sold its assets to Four Streams LLC.

== Hanover Farm ==
The Hanover Farm House was originally located on a rural land parcel that was one of the earliest land grants in western Montgomery County. It was deeded to Dr. Patrick Hepburn, a prosperous Maryland landowner in 1722. Hepburn named the property "Hanover Farm", in honor of King George I of the House of Hanover of Great Britain.

Starting in 1790, Patrick Hepburn's son, Samuel Hepburn, sold parcels of land from Hanover Farm to the Hempstone family. For the next 160 years, Hanover Farms would be owned and farmed by five generations of this family. Between 1801 and 1804 William Hempstone, a soldier in the American Revolutionary War, constructed the brick manor house that still stands today. At that time the land was 524 acres. Eventually William Hempstone's granddaughter Caroline and her husband Charles Griffith, who married in 1874, bought the family farm and home. By the mid-1930s, the Griffiths grandson, Charles H. Davis, owned Hanover Farm and began a dairy farm on the approximately 300 acres.

When Davis retired from farming in 1963, Edward and Mary Stock purchased the residence and land. The Stock family operated Stock Brothers, Inc., a nursery and landscaping business. In 1980 the manor house of Hanover Farm was accepted onto the National Register of Historic Places.

== Four Streams ==
In 1998, after the Stocks died, their heirs sold Hanover Farm to a Baltimore-based group that developed the Four Streams Golf Club.

The 18 hole course was designed by professional golfer Nick Price and Steve Smyers. Four Streams was the first design for Price, winner of three PGA major golf tournaments. Smyers was a veteran golf course designer who created courses at the Southern Dunes Golf and Country Club in Orlando, Florida, and the Wolf Run Golf Club in Indianapolis, Indiana. Price and Smeyers incorporated the natural features of the farmland into the course.

In July 2003, the club members purchased Four Streams, creating a nonprofit, non-stock corporation to oversee the club. They changed its name to the Members Club at Four Streams.

Four Streams is also the home golf course for both the Men's and Women's golf teams at Georgetown University.

== Awards and recognitions ==
- Ranked as one of the “World’s Top 1,000 golf Courses” by Rolex,
- Listed in “The Best of American golf 2010” by Links,
- Ranked second in “Best Private Golf Courses in the DC area” by CBSDC.com.
- Awarded a “Top Golf Architecture Award for Outstanding Design in Maryland” by Golf Digest for several years.
- The ninth hole has been included in “The Perfect 18” of the Middle Atlantic by Golf Styles Washington.
- Ranked by Washingtonian Magazine as one of the "Ten Great Golf Holes in Washington", with the 11th hole listed as one of their "Five Great Par Fours".
- The Director of Instruction, Steve Bosdosh, PGA, has been named one of the Top 100 golf instructors in the United States by Golf Magazine for the past sixteen years,
- Bosdosh also consistently rated by Golf Digest as one of the top teachers in the Mid-Atlantic states.
