= Brook Hollow Golf Club =

Golf course in Dallas, Texas

- Interactive map of Brook Hollow Golf Club
- 32°50′3″N 96°51′50″W

Club information
- Established: 1920
- Type: Private
- Tournaments: Dallas Invitational; U.S. Junior Amateur; U.S. Mid-Amateur

Brook Hollow Golf Club is a private golf course in Dallas, Texas.

== History ==
Brook Hollow is one of the original golf courses in Dallas, Texas. It was originally built in 1920 by golf course architect A. W. Tillinghast. The founders of the club were inspired by golf course designs in the northeastern United States, with one founder being a member of Pine Valley Golf Club.

In 2010, Brook Hollow was inducted into the Texas Golf Hall of Fame in the "historic course" category. In 2019, golf course architect Keith Foster was hired to return Brook Hollow to its original design. Renovations to the course were also previously done by Coore & Crenshaw.

== Tournaments ==
The Byron Nelson, known at the time as the Dallas Invitational, was held at Brook Hollow in 1946, with Ben Hogan winning the tournament. It has also hosted the U.S. Junior Amateur and the U.S. Mid-Amateur. During World War II, Bob Hope and Bing Crosby played an exhibition match at Brook Hollow to raise money for war bonds.

== See also ==
- List of golf courses in the United States
