= Winter Park Country Club and Golf Course =

- U.S. National Register of Historic Places
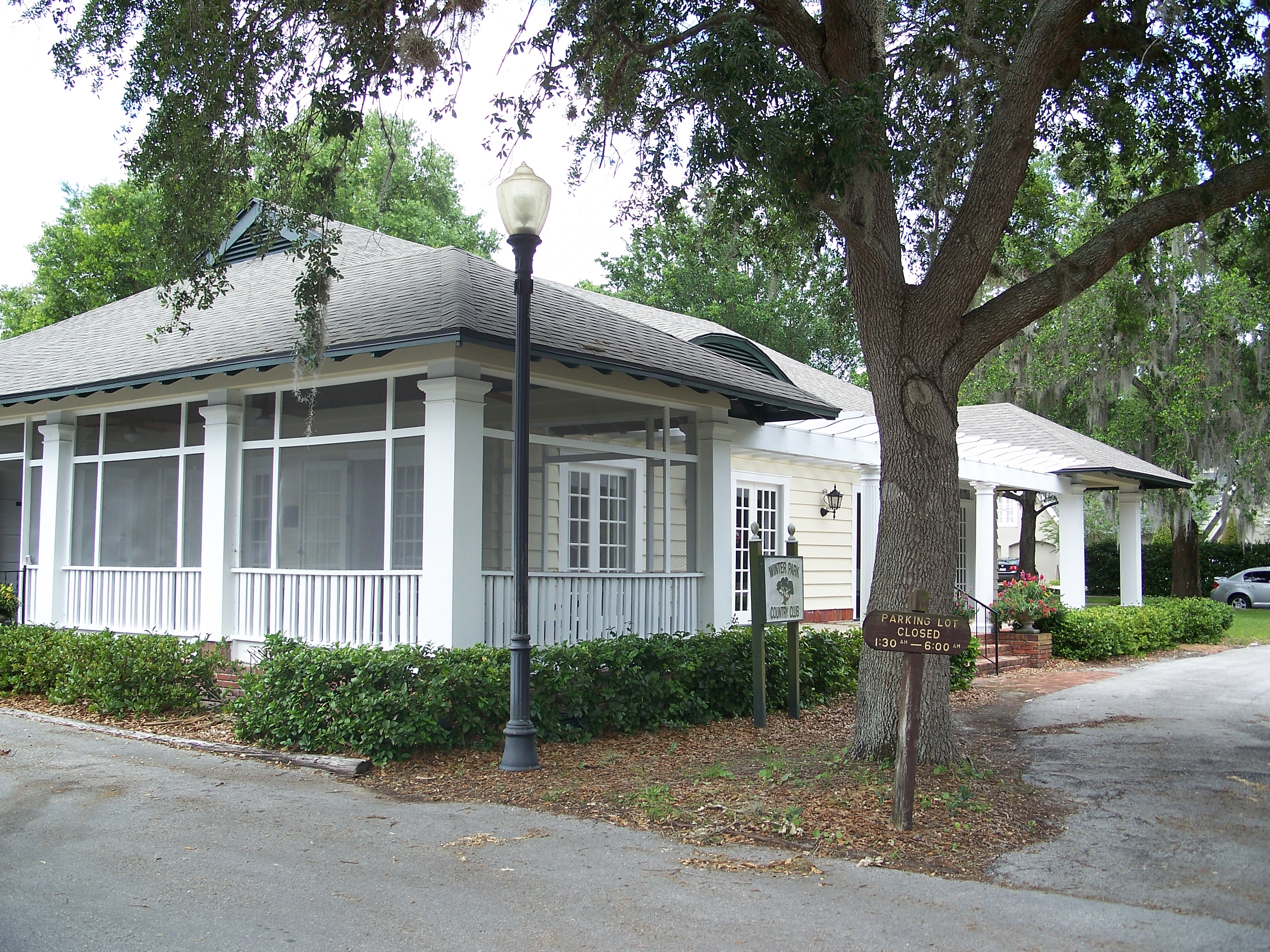

- Location within Florida Location within the United States
- Location: Winter Park, Florida
- Coordinates: 28°36′15″N 81°21′12″W
- Built: 1914
- Architectural style: Bungalow/Craftsman
- NRHP reference No.: 99001148
- Added to NRHP: September 17, 1999

The Winter Park Country Club and Golf Course is a historic site in Winter Park, Florida, United States. It is located at 761 Old England Avenue. On September 17, 1999, it was added to the U.S. National Register of Historic Places. The golf course is a 9-hole, par 35 walking course that is 2470 yards long.
