= Avon Fields Golf Course =

Golf course in Cincinnati, Ohio, US

Coordinates: 39°09′29″N 84°28′38″W

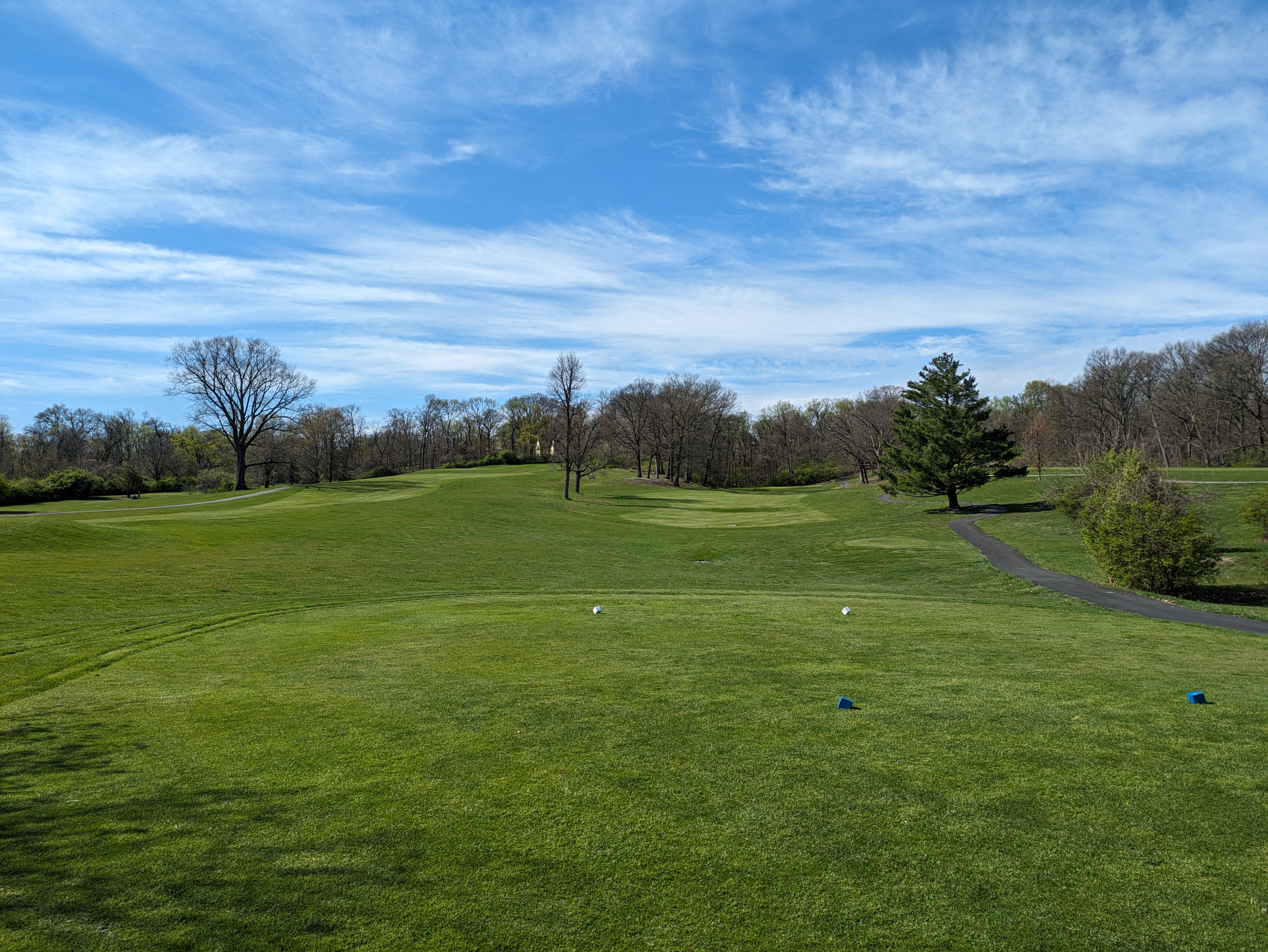
- Avon Fields Golf Course in 2024
- Interactive map of Avon Fields Golf Course

Club information
- Location: Cincinnati, Ohio
- Established: 1924
- Type: Public
- Operator: Cincinnati Recreation Commission
- Tota holes: 18
- Greens: Bent grass
- Fairways: Bent grass
- Website: www.cincygolf.org/avon-fields
- Par: 66
- Length: 4,963
- Course rating: 63.8
- Slope rating: 111

Avon Fields Golf Course is a historic golf course in Cincinnati, Ohio, USA.

The course was developed and run by the city until the late 1990s when Kemper Sports Management won the rights to run the city courses. In 2003, Billy Casper Golf took over the contract.

Avon Field is located in North Avondale and borders Norwood. The course is the oldest municipal course west of the Alleghenies. City records cannot be found for the original course designer. The Donald Ross archival website lists Avon Fields as one of his designs. Others suggest it was designed by a member of the Spaulding family, later famous for sporting goods. While records show that renowned architect William Langford a revision of the design in 1925.

Avon is a par 66 18-hole golf course consisting of 12 par 4s and 6 par 3s and a full service driving range. The front and back nines were switched in the 1960s, when construction of the Norwood Lateral provided the impetus to reduce some of the steepest hills and to rework this vintage course

== Score card ==
Tee	Rating/Slope	1	2	3	4	5	6	7	8	9	Out	10	11	12	13	14	15	16	17	18	In	Total
Blue	M:63.8/111 W:68.7/119	369	153	271	432	354	142	358	177	362	2618	245	290	149	351	368	320	156	142	324	2345	4963
White	M:62.4/106 W:66.8/114	355	131	265	388	333	136	338	171	288	2405	242	249	132	331	334	290	150	136	318	2182	4587
Gold	M:61.5/101 W:64.6/110	348	127	260	298	319	130	328	138	270	2218	239	240	105	305	309	258	147	123	290	2016	4234
Par		4	3	4	4	4	3	4	3	4	33	4	4	3	4	4	4	3	3	4	33	66
SI	Men's	5	17	11	1	9	13	7	15	3		12	10	14	4	2	8	16	18	6
SI	Women's	1	15	11	7	5	13	3	17	9		10	12	18	6	2	8	14	16	4
