= Dothan National Golf Club =

Golf club in Dothan, Alabama

- Interactive map of Dothan National Golf Club
- 31°12′8″N 85°40′59″W

Club information
- Location: Dothan, Alabama
- Established: 1968
- Tota holes: 18
- Tournaments: 1974 SEC Collegiate Golf Championship
- Par: 72/73
- Length: 7,425 yards

Dothan National Golf Club is located in Dothan, Alabama. The golf course was built in 1968 by golf course architect Bob Simmons. Simmons designed and built golf courses for 30 years before his death in 1986. Dothan National Golf Club was originally named Olympia Spa and under that moniker played host to the 1974 SEC Collegiate Golf Championship. In the 1980s the name of the club changed to Dothan National Golf Club. In 2000, the club hosted the Nike Tour. The golf course has also hosted multiple Emerald Coast Golf Tour events. In 2004, the Emerald Coast Golf Tour Fall Classic Golf Tournament was won by Bubba Watson who eventually went on to the PGA Tour and won a Masters green jacket in 2011.

The golf course is 7,425 yards long from the back tees and plays to both par 72 and a par 73 due to the 18th hole which is listed on the card as par four or a par five depending on the tee location.

The property was originally developed by the Flower's family which also developed nearby Flower's Hospital. The Flowers were originally drilling for oil on the property and instead of hitting oil, they tapped into a hot mineral water spring. Doctor Flowers sent patients from his hospital to the Olympia Spa for rehabilitation. The golf course and hotel were built around the site of the hot mineral spring. The Flowers family sold the golf club and hotel in 1988.

The golf course and hotel went bankrupt and closed in the fall of 2012. New owners reopened the facility in January 2013.
