= Oakridge Country Club =

Golf course in Farmington, Utah

Coordinates: 41.00°N 111.92°W

- Interactive map of Oakridge Country Club

Club information
- Location: Farmington, Utah
- Established: 1957
- Type: Private
- Tota holes: 18
- Tournaments: Utah Championship, Utah Open, Utah State Amateur Championship,
- Designed by: William F. Bell and William Neff
- Par: 72
- Length: 6,916 yards (6,324 m)
- Course rating: 72.4
- Slope rating: 125

Oakridge Country Club is a golf course located in Farmington, Utah. Oakridge Country Club is a private, member-owned 18-hole golf course designed by William F. Bell and William Neff. The Country Club opened in 1957 and has approximately 400 members. During the Davis County windstorm of December 2011, hurricane-force winds ripped through the country club and destroyed an estimated 400 old growth trees, vastly changing the landscape and scenery of the course. In the spring of 2016, Oakridge completed a project to clean ponds, expand irrigation water storage and improve the design of the water features.

== Notable tournaments hosted ==
- Web.com Tour Utah Championship
- Utah Open
- Utah Amateur
- Korn Ferry Golf
