= Talamore Country Club =

Coordinates: 40.197°N 75.202°W

Talamore Country Club is an 18-hole private golf course located in Ambler, Pennsylvania, approximately 20 miles northwest of Philadelphia. Opened in 1995, the course was designed by owner Bob Levy and Architect Rees Jones and is part of the Talamore Family of Clubs. It is known for its "low country" design, featuring expansive wetlands and sod-faced bunkers, which provide a distinctive aesthetic in the Pennsylvania region.

== History ==
Talamore Country Club was established in 1995 on the site of the former Oak Terrace Country Club, incorporating elements of the property's early 20th-century mansion and stables into its ambiance. According to the club, the course was named one of the "Best New Private Courses in the Country" by Golf Digest in 1995.

== Design and features ==
The course, designed by Bob Levy and Rees Jones, spans 6,700 yards from the longest tees with a par of 71. It has a course rating of 72.8 and a slope rating of 139 on bentgrass. The layout is noted for its challenging yet accessible design, with six sets of tees catering to various skill levels. Its signature "low country" feel, characterized by wetlands and native Pennsylvania flora, is complemented by sod-faced bunkers that add visual and strategic complexity.

== Recognition ==
The course is praised for its excellent condition and scenic beauty, with reviewers noting its picturesque approach shots and well-maintained fairways. It remains a prominent private course in the Philadelphia area, occasionally accessible to the public through platforms like GolfNow.

== Facilities ==
As part of the Talamore Family of Clubs, the golf course is complemented by amenities within the club building, including a game center, a driving range, and an indoor/outdoor golf performance center led by instructor Lou Guzzi. The club also offers dining, tennis, swimming, and fitness facilities.
