= Westlake Golf Course =

Golf course in Westlake Village, California

Coordinates: 34°09′00″N 118°48′50″W

- Location in California

Club information
- Location: Westlake Village, California, U.S.
- Established: 1964
- Type: Public
- Tota holes: 18

Westlake Golf Course
- Designed by: Ted Robinson, ASGCA
- Par: 67
- Length: 5080 yd
- Course rating: 63.2
- Slope rating: 93

Westlake Golf Course is an 18-hole regulation length golf course located in Westlake Village, California, USA. It is an 18-hole course designed by Ted Robinson, ASGCA in 1964. It features 5,080 yards (4,650 m) of golf from the longest tees for a par of 67. The course rating is 63.2 and it has a slope rating of 93.
