= Butler's Golf Course =

Coordinates: 40.267°N 79.812°W

- Interactive map of Butler's Golf Course

Club information
- Location: Elizabeth Township, Allegheny County, near Elizabeth, Pennsylvania
- Established: 1928
- Type: Public
- Tota holes: 36
- Website: Official site

Woodside Course
- Par: 72
- Length: 6314
- Course rating: 69.8

Lakeside Course
- Par: 72
- Length: 6689
- Course rating: 71.3

Butler's Golf Course is a public golf course founded in 1928 located just east of Elizabeth, Pennsylvania. There are two 18-hole courses at this facility, the Woodside and the Lakeside.

== Beginnings to the 1960s ==
The site where the course stands now was originally an airport and a strawberry farm owned by John W. Butler. In 1925 the airport closed when a stunt pilot took Butler's daughter for a ride and did a loop-di-loop.

Soon, Butler hired some people who had knowledge about golf and built the original 18 holes which opened in 1928. The original clubhouse was built in the 1930s, but was destroyed in a tornado on August 3, 1963.

== The 1960s to the present ==
The clubhouse was rebuilt after the tornado, and the Butler house became a bed & breakfast inn for vacationing tourists. The Lakeside course opened in 1963 with nine holes. The original 18 holes were rebuilt and became known as the Woodside course upon completion of the Lakeside course. In 1996, the back nine holes of the Woodside course became known as the Vista course. Nine more holes were added to the Lakeside course in 2000, and the two courses are known as the Woodside and the Lakeside.

== The course today ==
The course is now owned by the fourth generation of the Butler family.

== Scorecard ==
Woodside Course
Tee	Rating/Slope	1	2	3	4	5	6	7	8	9	Out	10	11	12	13	14	15	16	17	18	In	Total
Par		5	3	4	4	4	4	5	4	3	36	5	4	4	3	5	3	4	4	4	36	72
SI	Men's	18	9	15	5	11	3	7	1	13		17	14	10	12	16	4	8	6	2
Blue		436	155	314	392	322	386	532	417	159	3113	472	352	310	161	503	168	411	417	420	3202	6314
White		421	145	304	382	317	368	512	409	154	3012	458	343	303	153	491	163	401	404	405	3109	6121
Gold		341	135	293	372	311	290	447	323	149	2661	378	259	255	148	421	157	291	280	287	2464	5126
Red		334	125	282	362	307	285	444	317	144	2600	373	254	248	143	419	154	289	277	285	2428	5029
SI	Women's	7	5	18	1	15	3	9	11	16		14	17	10	8	6	4	12	13	2

Lakeside Course
Tee	Rating/Slope	1	2	3	4	5	6	7	8	9	Out	10	11	12	13	14	15	16	17	18	In	Total
Par		4	4	3	5	4	4	4	5	3	36	5	3	4	3	4	5	4	4	4	36	72
SI	Men's	10	2	18	16	12	4	15	8	6		14	13	7	17	3	9	5	11	1
Blue		386	380	127	520	388	382	335	585	185	3288	499	205	370	108	466	546	402	404	401	3401	6689
White		378	370	118	500	378	365	320	568	167	3177	469	176	352	105	426	538	385	374	356	3181	6358
Gold		297	274	114	420	326	218	310	543	150	2652	413	157	329	96	337	414	361	364	319	2790	5442
Red		290	267	112	410	316	211	305	532	145	2588	374	131	311	89	308	397	336	333	309	2588	5176
SI	Women's	9	2	18	14	11	16	13	8	5		7	15	12	17	10	3	4	1	6

== Trivia ==
- Butler's was one of the first public courses in Pennsylvania.
