= Eagle Springs Golf Resort =

9-hole golf course created in 1893 located in Eagle, Wisconsin

- Location within Wisconsin
- 42.856°N 88.451°W

Club information
- Location: Eagle, Wisconsin
- Established: 1893
- Tota holes: 9

Eagle Springs Golf Resort is a 9-hole golf course created in 1893 located in Eagle, Wisconsin.

== History ==
The land the resort and golf course is on was settled in 1866 by John and Mary Tuohy. It originally was a 601-acre (2.43 km^{2}) farm. In 1893, John Tuohy sold the land to his son William who saw it as the perfect opportunity to build a golf course. The resort, including grand hotel, 12 cottages, and 18-hole golf course, drew many people from Milwaukee, Waukesha, and even Chicago. When the course first opened, it was only 25 cents to play 18 holes, but William was known for letting people golf for free if they didn't have enough money.

In 1920, William's daughter died making it painful for him to stay at the resort. He left for one year and upon his return he ordered that the hotel be sold and moved. After neglecting the resort, he began to focus on improving and updating the course. A. G. Spalding was asked to design the first two holes on the course, but William wanted the other holes to be shaped by the land. When the depression struck, the resort was forced to cut the golf course down to 9 holes, which it has stayed ever since.

After the death of William in 1939, his widow (Kitty) operated the resort with the aid of her son (Brian William Tuohy), daughter (Mary Tuohy Ryan), and granddaughter (Mary Ann Ryan). The latter three, and a second, non-resident son (Raymond Tuohy) inherited the property on the death of Kitty in the 1950s. Mary Ann was the mother of the present owner, Michael Bolan.

=== Present Day ===
Eagle Springs Golf Resort is currently owned by a fifth generation Tuohy, Michael Bolan. The golf course contains nine of the twelve original cottages which are rented out during the summer months. The second hole was named the ninth best par 3 hole in the state of Wisconsin in 2011
