= Stonebridge Golf Club =

Coordinates: 34.33909°N 85.1925°W

Stonebridge Golf Club is a 240-acre golf complex in Rome, Georgia, at the foothills of the Appalachian Mountains. The course was designed by Arthur L. Davis and built in the early 1990s by the City of Rome.

The golf course is an 18-hole, par 72 course with 6,832 yards of fairway consisting of Bermuda grass and Champion Bermuda greens. The club features a 5,000-square-foot (460 m^{2}) clubhouse that holds a pro shop and the Stonebridge Grill. The club also includes a driving range, chipping green, and practice bunker.

Stonebridge has a resident PGA Golf Professional, Adam Lyons, and offers private and group classes to all ages and skill levels.

== Awards ==
Stonebridge Golf Club has received awards since opening in 1994 for its challenging championship course with a 73 rating and 128 slope.

- Golf Digest named Stonebridge "One of Georgia's Top Twenty Golf Courses" in 1997.
- Golf Digest included Stonebridge as " One of America's Top 75 Best Most Affordable Courses" in 1996.
- Georgia Golf News listed Stonebridge as "Georgia's Best Public Golf Course" in 2002.

== Annual Tournaments ==
Stonebridge hosts annual events and tournaments. During the spring Stonebridge is the location where all Floyd County schools hold their matches and tournaments.

- The Georgia Public Links
- The Georgia Senior Women's Championships
