= Springfield Golf Club =

Golf course in the U.S. state of Oregon

Coordinates: 44.119°N 122.9165°W

Pine Ridge Golf Club is a golf course in the U.S. state of Oregon, located in the Mohawk Valley about eight miles northeast of the Eugene-Springfield area. Part of the course is located along the Mohawk River. The 18-hole course is just over 6500 yards.

== History ==
Springfield Golf Club was established in 1957 by a group of around 40 neighbors who purchased farmland and turned it into a six-hole golf course. The course grew to nine-holes, and then to 18-holes in the 1980s. Later a 10,000 square feet (930 m^{2}) clubhouse was added to the club. The course was sold and renamed Pine Ridge Golf Club in November 2018.

== Golf course ==
The front nine holes winds through the Marcola hills, while the back nine is carved by the banks of the Mohawk River.

Springfield Golf Club Scorecard.
Tee	Rating/Slope	1	2	3	4	5	6	7	8	9	Out	10	11	12	13	14	15	16	17	18	In	Total
Par		5	4	4	3	4	4	4	5	4	37	3	5	4	4	4	3	4	3	5	35	72
Green	72.0 / 126	502	436	420	159	371	358	404	546	413	3609	183	517	415	391	377	182	360	176	495	3096	6705
Black	71.5 / 122	490	387	414	146	326	358	391	536	400	3448	177	511	409	379	371	171	354	165	483	3020	6468
Blue	70.0 / 122	490	313	414	146	326	358	325	458	362	3192	177	471	409	379	371	151	354	165	483	2960	6152
White	M:67.7/119 L:73.3/127	474	313	328	132	261	314	325	458	362	2967	159	471	334	339	354	135	335	136	465	2728	5695
Red	70.2 / 120	423	307	328	94	261	314	310	407	282	2726	159	410	334	339	292	117	335	103	400	2489	5215

== Cross country ==
The Bill Dellinger Invitational intercollegiate cross country meet is held annually on the golf course.
