= Lambert Acres Course =

Golf course in Maryville, Tennessee

Lambert Acres Golf Course
- Interactive map of Lambert Acres Golf Course
- 35.7473°N 83.8854°W

Club information
- Location: Maryville, Tennessee, USA
- Established: 1965
- Type: Public
- Owner: Nick Berrong And James Lee Berrong
- Operator: Chad Berrong
- Tota holes: 27
- Website: Official website

White
- Designed by: Ray Franklin
- Par: 36
- Length: 3,245 yards

Orange
- Designed by: Ray Franklin
- Par: 36
- Length: 3,047

Red
- Designed by: Ray Franklin
- Par: 36
- Length: 3,235

The Lambert Acres Golf Club is a 27-hole golf course in Maryville, Tennessee with views of the Great Smoky Mountains. The golf course contains 9,525 yards of rolling hills with slopes throughout the entire landscape. The course opened in 1965 and was designed by Ray Franklin. The club currently has three different 9-hole courses which are named White, Orange, and Red. Each course has nine holes but are usually played two at a time. The club is owned by Nick and James Lee Berrong and managed by Chad Berrong.

== University use ==
Aside from being a public golf course the Lambert Acres Golf Course is currently used by the cross country teams at the University of Tennessee. The course has been the location for the Volunteers' team meets for over fifteen years mainly because of its proximity to campus. Over the past decade, the course has played host to the Tennessee Invitational nine times, the NCAA South Regional in 2002, 2006 and 2008, and hosted the 1998 SEC Championship meet.

== Scorecard ==
The par and yardage shown are the scores specifically for champ level, but if the golfer does not wish to attempt that level there is also a ladies and mens level which features different yardage compared to the champ level.

White

| # | 1 | 2 | 3 | 4 | 5 | 6 | 7 | 8 | 9 | In |
|---|---|---|---|---|---|---|---|---|---|---|
| Par | 4 | 5 | 4 | 3 | 4 | 3 | 5 | 4 | 4 | 36 |
| Yds | 360 | 500 | 380 | 200 | 420 | 165 | 500 | 340 | 380 | 3,245 |

Orange

| # | 1 | 2 | 3 | 4 | 5 | 6 | 7 | 8 | 9 | In |
|---|---|---|---|---|---|---|---|---|---|---|
| Par | 4 | 4 | 5 | 3 | 4 | 3 | 4 | 5 | 4 | 36 |
| Yds | 358 | 319 | 480 | 150 | 377 | 185 | 370 | 472 | 336 | 3,047 |

Red

| # | 1 | 2 | 3 | 4 | 5 | 6 | 7 | 8 | 9 | In |
|---|---|---|---|---|---|---|---|---|---|---|
| Par | 4 | 3 | 4 | 5 | 3 | 4 | 5 | 4 | 4 | 36 |
| Yds | 380 | 205 | 450 | 515 | 155 | 360 | 440 | 320 | 410 | 3,235 |
