= Stuart Yacht & Country Club =

Gated community in Florida

Coordinates: 27.15835837165°N 80.20129496°W

- Logo for the club's anniversary year of 2021
- Interactive map of Stuart Yacht & Country Club

Club information
- Location: Stuart, Florida, U.S.
- Established: Community: 1969 (57 years ago); Golf course: 1971 (55 years ago)
- Type: Private, member-owned
- Website: www.yccstuart.org
- Designed by: Charles Martyn (1971); Tom Pearson (2020)
- Par: 71
- Length: 6,574

Stuart Yacht & Country Club is a gated community and country club in Stuart, Florida, United States. Established in 1969 as the first golf-course community in Martin County, homes were built first, followed two years later by the golf course, designed by Charles Martyn. The golf course, which is par-71, 6,574 yards, was redesigned in 2020 by Tom Pearson, who worked for Jack Nicklaus Design for over thirty years. Part of his redesign made a couple of the par-5 holes over 600 yards long.

The course hosted tournaments in 1971 and 1972 that featured the likes of Jack Nicklaus, Perry Como and Sam Snead. The pro-am events raised money for the Stamp Out Drug Abuse campaign. To prepare for the tournaments, the club built a new main entrance on State Route A1A and installed a guardhouse that is staffed 24 hours per day. Almost forty coconut palms and ficus trees were planted, to improve curb appeal.

The club's last surviving founder member of the original twenty, Evans Crary Jr., turned 90 in 2020. He hit the ceremonial tee shot to mark the opening of the new course. A bridge in the city, crossing the St. Lucie River, is named for him. Crary did not plan on becoming a member of the Yacht & Country Club. He said its developer had lined up the original members to pay $15,000 to finance the club in 1968, but one of them pulled out just before the deal could be completed. His brother convinced him to withdraw the necessary funds. He left the club in 1983 but returned 23 years later, currently lives about 100 yards from the eighth green.

The golf club's head golf professional is Dean Lawson.

== Gallery ==
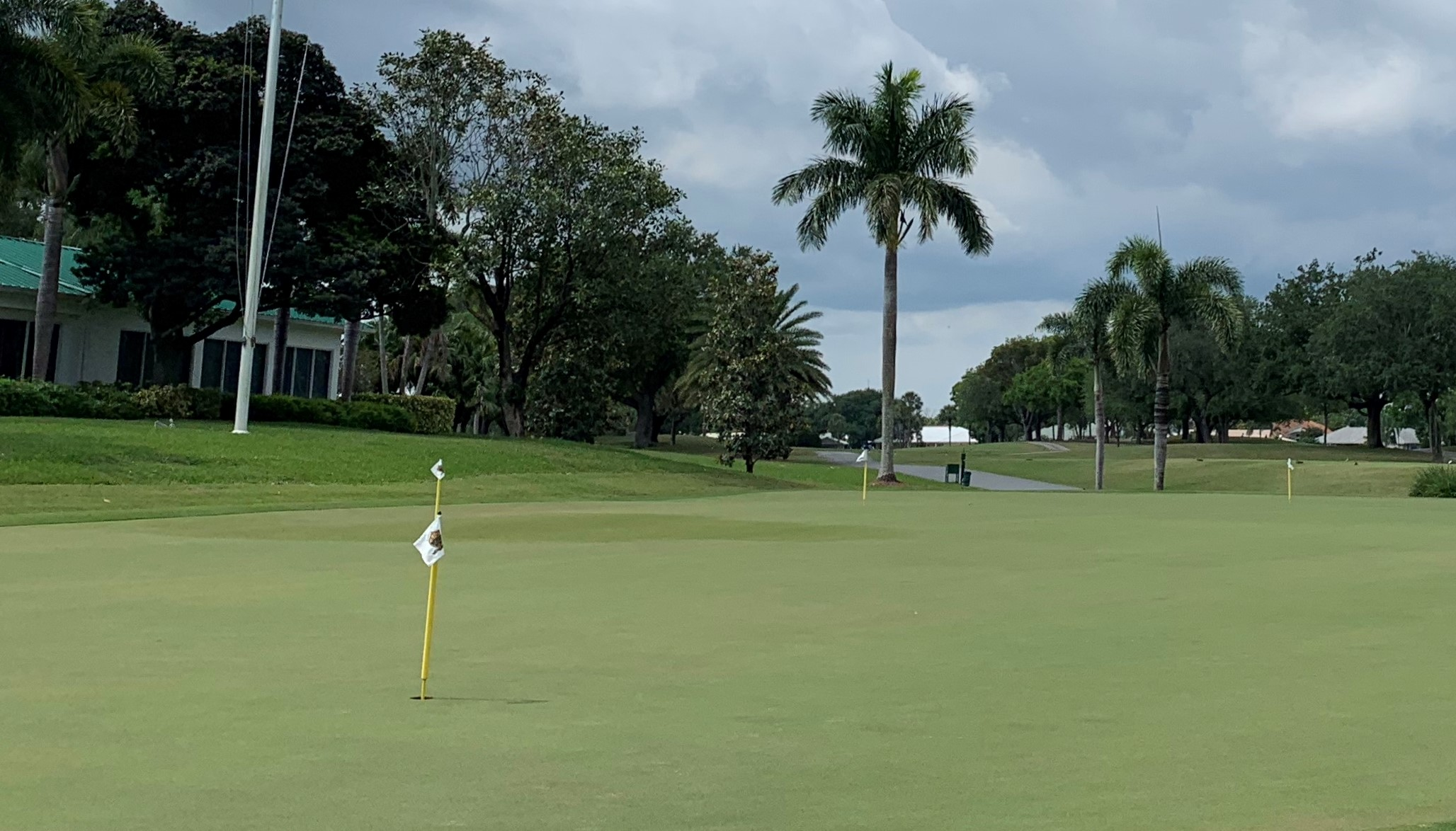
The course's practice green, 2019
