= Steve Bosdosh =

American golfer

Steve Bosdosh is an American professional golfer.

Bosdosh has worked predominantly as a teaching professional, and is the director of instruction at Four Streams Golf Academy in Beallsville, Maryland. He previously held the same position at the TPC at Avenel in Potomac, Maryland for over fourteen years. He has conducted numerous golf schools for Golf Digest and the PGA Tour, and held clinics for many Fortune 500 companies across the United States. He has also worked with many tournament players on the leading tours.

Golf Magazine ranked Bosdosh as one of the top 100 teaching professionals in the United States, and Golf Digest ranked him as one of the top in the state of Maryland. He has also been nominated for the National PGA Teacher of the Year award. He has contributed golf instructional articles for several leading publications, including Golf Magazine, Sports Illustrated and the Washington Post.
