= Applebrook Golf Club =

Golf course in the United States

Coordinates: 40.0023053°N 75.5379156°W

- Interactive map of Applebrook Golf Club

Club information
- Location: East Goshen Township, Chester County, near Malvern, Pennsylvania, USA
- Established: 1999
- Type: Private
- Tota holes: 18
- Website: Official Website
- Designed by: Gil Hanse
- Par: 71
- Length: 6,942 yards
- Course rating: 73.5

Applebrook Golf Club is a golf course just outside Malvern, Pennsylvania. It was designed by Gil Hanse. Its rating is 73.7 for the black tee.

== History and design ==
The Applebrook Golf Club is located on the property of the former Applebrook Farm, which was deeded by William Penn to Robert Williams in 1702. The golf course was designed by Gil Hanse in 1999 and opened in 2001. Applebrook's Performance Center, an 1800-square-foot indoor/outdoor practice facility, opened in 2018.

The course features four par-five holes within the first 522 yards. The ninth and eighteenth holes feature the "quarry", a sandy area that offers views of the entire course. Suburban Life Magazine called Applebrook "one of the most compelling courses around" that "combines natural beauty with plenty of water hazards, nasty bunkers and quick fairways."

In 2019, Applebrook hosted the GAP Patterson Cup. Applebrook was ranked the 14th best golf course in Pennsylvania by Golf Digest.

== Scorecard ==
Applebrook Golf Club
Tee	Rating/Slope	1	2	3	4	5	6	7	8	9	Out	10	11	12	13	14	15	16	17	18	In	Total
Par		5	4	4	4	3	4	4	5	3	36	5	3	4	4	4	3	5	3	4	35	71
Black	M-73.5/135	530	373	325	443	210	422	467	583	153	3506	536	122	411	456	447	223	579	179	483	3436	6942
Composite	M-71.9/130	530	373	325	383	187	422	433	561	153	3367	536	122	385	429	393	197	523	179	435	3199	6566
Orange	M-70.6/128	488	344	299	383	187	378	433	561	139	3212	486	109	353	429	393	197	523	167	435	3092	6304
Gold	M-68.6/124 W-73.8/131	469	334	286	373	167	353	368	549	121	3020	449	109	340	357	358	185	515	131	389	2833	5853
Forward Composite	M-66.3/120 W-71.7/127	469	278	286	373	128	285	368	452	121	2760	449	89	340	357	290	149	447	131	308	2560	5320
White	M-64.2/116 W-68.4/120	385	278	224	321	128	285	368	452	114	2555	376	89	289	357	290	149	382	96	308	2336	4891
SI	M	15	9	17	3	11	5	1	7	13		16	18	12	2	6	8	10	14	4
SI	F	15	9	17	5	11	7	1	3	13		8	18	14	2	10	4	6	16	12
