= Barker Lake Golf Course =

Golf course in Wisconsin, United States

Coordinates: 45°54′53″N 91°01′34″W

Barker Lake Golf Course is a golf course that was built in the 1920s by the early prohibition gangster Joseph Saltis, who along with legendary mobsters Al Capone and Hymie Weiss, controlled Chicago's bootlegging business. Barker Lake Golf Course is located in Winter, Wisconsin, and is one of the oldest courses in the northern Wisconsin region, being open almost 90 years. It is still open to the public, and the clubhouse serves as a museum containing Joe Saltis memorabilia that his youngest son donated.

Saltis effectively ran the southwest side of Chicago until 1929 when his operation began to fall apart after many gang wars and several disputes within the gang. Soon after Joe Saltis retired and spent the remainder of his years at his Baker Lake estate near Winter, Wisconsin. His Barker Lake estate included a lodge, several cabins, a barn, a bar/clubhouse, and a nine-hole golf course. Barker Lake Golf Course is a Scottish style golf course that Saltis had made to entertain himself and his guests during the summer, and in the winter it served as his hunting grounds. It took several years to complete, and even Kentucky soil was shipped in by train to help the richness of the clay-like northern Wisconsin soil.
