= Brooksville Golf and Country Club =

Golf club in Florida

- Location in Florida
- 28.57114402228403°N 82.34686346043846°W

Club information
- Location: Brooksville, Florida
- Established: 1971
- Type: Semi-private
- Owner: American Collegiate Academy
- Tota holes: 18
- Website: https://brooksvillecc.com
- Designed by: William Mitchell; Bobby Weed; Chris Mont
- Par: 72
- Length: 6,812 yards (6,229 m)
- Slope rating: 128

Brooksville Golf and Country Club is a golf club in Brooksville, Florida. Opened in 1971, the course was originally designed by William Mitchell, with renovations in the back nine holes by Bobby Weed. The course is characterized by deep rough and trees, and has been praised for its unique "quarry holes", constructed in a former mining pit; the 12th and 17th holes have been recognized by Golf Digest as one of the "most fun" and "best designed" golf holes in the United States, respectively.

== History ==
Brooksville's clubhouse held its grand opening on April 18, 1971, with an initial club membership of 425.

By 2002, Brooksville faced "declining play and a dated layout". According to the Tampa Bay Times, "greens were in poor condition, tee boxes had become crowned and bunkers had lost their payability and attractiveness". The course was acquired that year by Tommy Bronson, a mining executive who envisioned the club as the centerpiece of a planned housing development, Majestic Oaks. Bronson and other investors spent $2 million to renovate the clubhouse and construct additional holes on the course, including four "quarry holes" constructed in a former mining pit. Renovations were overseen by Bronson's son and were initially delayed by heavy rain, but were mostly complete by the end of September 2003. By November 2003, the course was described by John Schwarb of Tampa Bay Times as a "brand new experience".

By 2015, the housing development had not materialized, but the course's financial situation had stabilized. The course was acquired by Min and Grace Kang in a lease-to-buy deal. The Kangs announced several renovations to the course, including plans to build a water hazard in open space between the 1st and 10th holes. As of 2022, the course is owned by American Collegiate Academy, LLC. In 2022, plans to add a private school in the housing development were approved by the Brooksville city council. David Wisner, general manager and majority owner, described this as part of a plan to "revitalize" the golf course, which "cannot sustain itself without more growth"; students at the school will be able to golf on the course.

== Facilities and grounds ==
=== Course ===
Hole	Name	Yards	Par	Hole	Name	Yards	Par
1	In the Beginning	403	4	10	Patience Endures	401	4
2	Upward Bound	408	4	11	Press On	484	5
3	Reach Ahead	525	5	12	Temptation	343	4
4	Faith Endures	399	4	13	Awesome	442	4
5	Simply Put	155	3	14	Courageous	199	3
6	Narrow Way	428	4	15	Peace Maker	440	4
7	Sure and Steadfast	501	5	16	Can Do	382	4
8	The Road	418	4	17	Still Waters	146	3
9	Delightful	187	3	18	Amen	551	5
Front		3,424	36	Back		3,388	36
				Total		6,812	72

The first nine holes were designed by William Mitchell in 1971, while the back nine were designed by Bobby Weed in a renovation. The first nine holes are regarded as "demanding but not overwhelming", with the back nine being where players "earn their keep". The most notable feature of Brooksville is located in the back nine holes: the four "quarry holes", which were designed by Bobby Weed. The 17th is usually cited as the highlight of the course. The course as a whole is characterized by trees, a lack of water on all but a handful of holes, and deep rough.

=== Reception ===
Brooksville's course has been well received. Jeff Berlinicke of FloridaGolf.com described the course as "challenging" and "long and is unforgiving if you miss the fairway". Berlinicke also praised the course's amenities, citing the driving course and putting green as "among the finest in central Florida".

In 2018, Tim Gravitch of GolfPass described the "quarry holes" as "other-worldly" and a "a spectacularly crazy penultimate act on a golf course I now consider a hidden gem". Grabitch cited the course as one of his ten favorites in Florida in 2019, reiterating that the "quarry holes" would "take your breath away, along with a golf ball or two". GolfPass author Brandon Tucker cited the course as the "best value" in the Tampa Bay area, citing its "exciting" design.

Mike Camunas of the Tampa Bay Times praised the course, writing in 2008 that it would "take your breath away". He praised the 12th hole as "awe-inspiring", citing the dual fairways and the novelty of having a "near-canyon" on a golf course in Florida. In 2010, Golf Digest listed the course's 12th hole as one of the 19 "most fun" holes in the United States, citing its alternate high and low fairways. In 2020, Derek Ducan of Golf Digest listed the 17th hole as one of the 18 best in the United States constructed since 2000. He called it a "beauty of a hole" and praised the "tremendous engineering" in incorporating the mine and quarry.
