= Apollo Beach Golf & Sea Club =

Golf club in Apollo Beach, Florida, US

- Interactive map of Apollo Beach Golf & Sea Club
- 27°45′54″N 82°24′53″W

Club information
- Location: Apollo Beach, Florida
- Established: 1962
- Type: Public
- Tota holes: 18
- Fairways: Paspalum
- Designed by: Robert Trent Jones
- Par: 72
- Length: 7033 yards

Apollo Beach Golf & Sea Club is a Robert Trent Jones-designed golf club in Apollo Beach, Florida, built in 1962. The course makes heavy use of the mangrove marshes and lagoons surrounding the course.
