= Kahkwa Country Club =

American golf course

Coordinates: 42.055°N 80.209°W

The Kahkwa Club is a Donald Ross designed golf course located in Erie, Pennsylvania. It was founded in 1893. It hosted the 1958 Women's Western Open. It also hosted the 2016 U.S. Women's Mid-Amateur.
