= Forest Park Golf Course =

Golf course in St. Louis, Missouri

- Location within Missouri
- 38°38′41″N 90°17′48″W

Club information
- Location: St. Louis, Missouri
- Established: 1912
- Type: Municipal
- Tota holes: 27
- Website: forestparkgc.com

Hawthorn
- Par: 35
- Length: 3,047 yards (2,790 m)
- Course rating: 33.4
- Slope rating: 108

Dogwood
- Par: 35
- Length: 3,140 yards (2,870 m)
- Course rating: 35.4
- Slope rating: 130

Redbud
- Par: 35
- Length: 3,174 yards (2,900 m)
- Course rating: 35.3
- Slope rating: 130

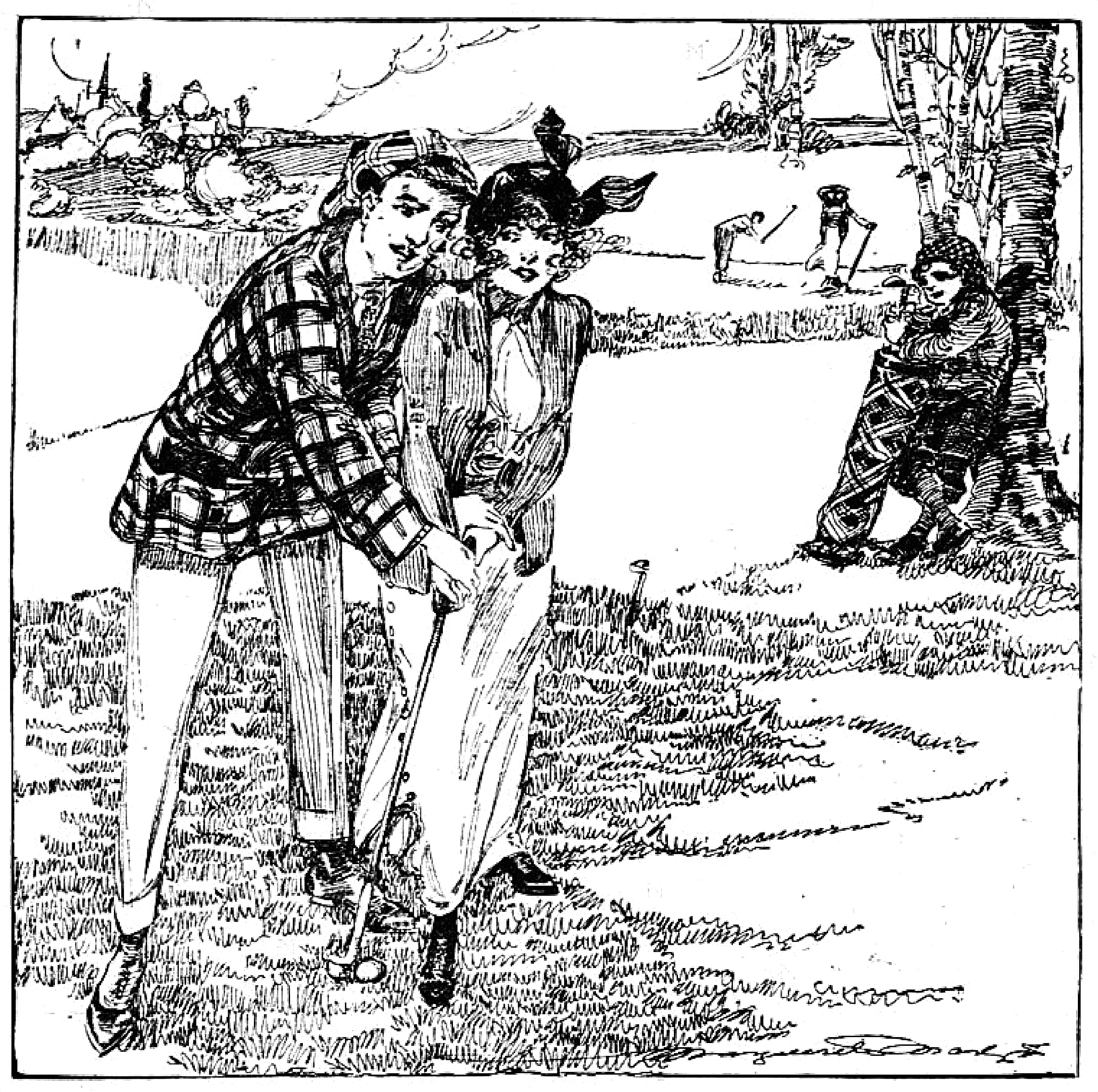
Imaginative drawing by journalist Marguerite Martyn at the Forest Park Golf Course in 1914, with a man showing a woman how to hold a golf club while a caddie leans against a tree

The Forest Park Golf Course, also known as the Courses at Forest Park or the Norman Probstein Community Golf Course, opened in 1912 as a nine-hole golf course. The original course was designed by Scotsman Robert Foulis, an employee of the Old Course at St Andrews, while a second and third set of nine holes were finished in 1913 and 1915. In 1929, the Forest Park Golf Course was home to the U.S. Amateur Public Links Championship.

Between 2001 and 2004, the three courses and the clubhouse were rebuilt under the direction of course designer Stan Gentry. The rebuilding project initially was funded by St. Louis developer Norman Probstein with a gift of $2 million, followed by donations of $2 million from Eagle Golf, $2.4 million from the Danforth Foundation, $4.5 million from Forest Park Forever, and $1.6 million from the city of St. Louis. The three rebuilt courses are named for trees in St. Louis: the Hawthorn is a relatively flat and walkable layout; the Dogwood is a somewhat hilly course with a water fairway; and the Redbud is very hilly and the most challenging layout of the three. One glass-enclosed clubhouse serves all three courses, and it includes a restaurant open to all park users known as Ruthie's Grill. After the completion of the renovations, the Forest Park Golf Course was named the Best Golf Course in St. Louis by the local alternative newspaper, the Riverfront Times.
