= Tam O'Shanter Golf Course (Pennsylvania) =

Public golf course in Hermitage, Pennsylvania

Coordinates: 41.1917°N 80.4530°W

Tam O'Shanter of Pennsylvania
- Interactive map of Tam O'Shanter of Pennsylvania

Club information
- Location: Hermitage, Pennsylvania
- Established: 1929
- Type: Public
- Tota holes: 18
- Tournaments: Herald Tam O'Shanter Junior Open
- Website: Official site
- Designed by: Emil Loeffler
- Par: 72
- Length: 6537
- Course rating: 70.2
- Course record: 65 Sam Snead

Tam O'Shanter Golf Course, officially known as Tam O'Shanter of Pennsylvania, is an 18 hole public golf course built in 1929 and was designed by Emil Loeffler. It is located in Hermitage, Pennsylvania.

== Beginnings to 1948 ==
Emil Loeffler, who was the superintendent of Oakmont Country Club, built the original 18 holes at Tam O'Shanter in 1929, just before the Great Depression began. The fourteenth hole, a short par 3, is known as "Death Valley".

In 1948, Jack and Mary Lou Kerins purchased the course.

== 1948 to the present ==
After the Kerins family bought the course in 1948, Jack Kerins started the annual Herald Tam O'Shanter Junior Open, which is a tournament held every June at the course played by junior golfers from around the Shenango Valley area.

On May 31, 1985, a tornado swept through the Shenango Valley and destroyed many trees on the golf course.

In the early 1990s, John and Rick Kerins bought the course from their parents and they continue to operate the course today.

True course record holder is Andy Wagner(63).
