= List of golf courses in Norway =

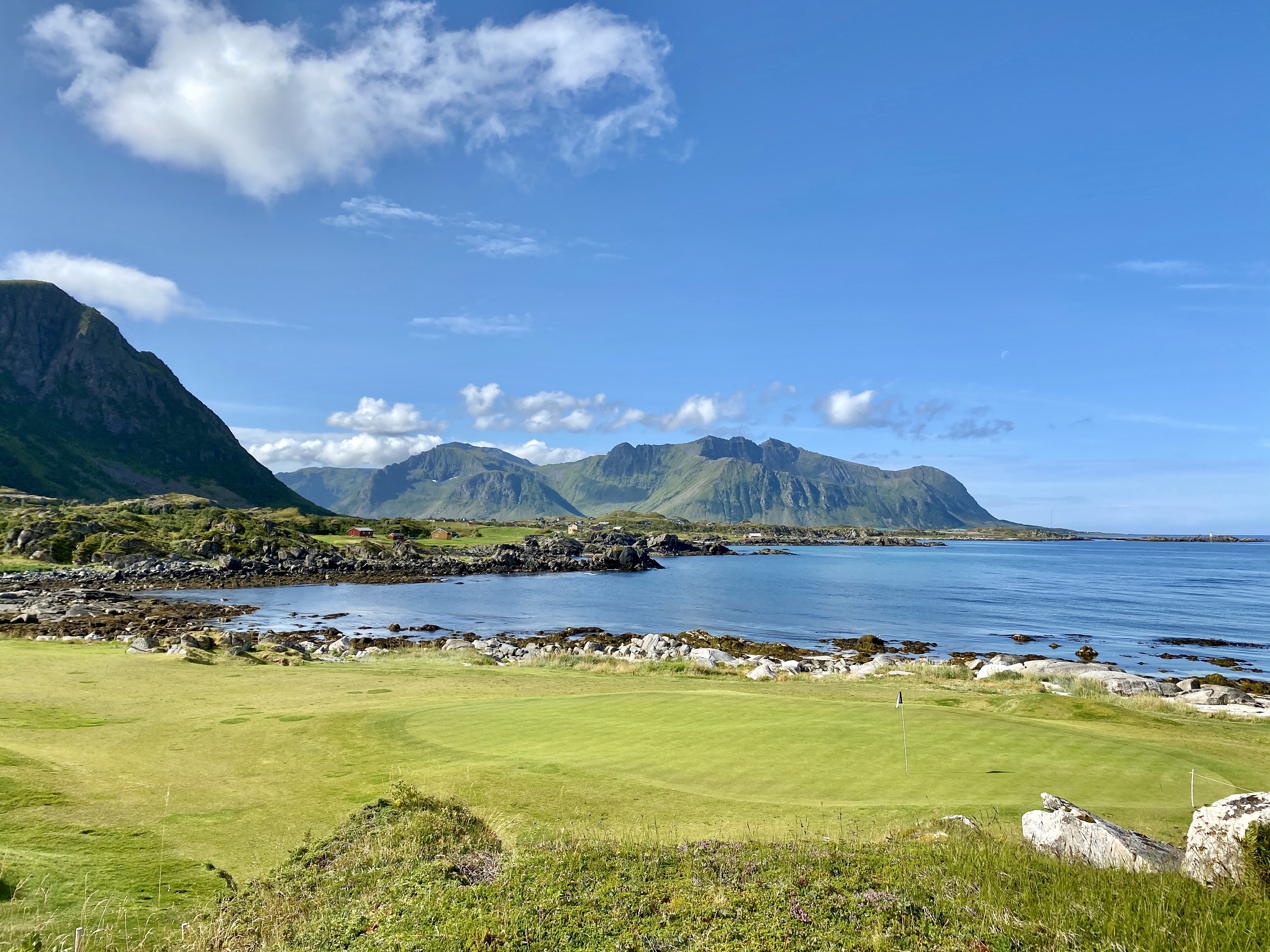
Hole number 1 on Lofoten Links in Lofoten.

This article is a list of golf courses in Norway.

== History ==
Norway's first golf course was started at Bogstad in Oslo in 1924. After that, Borregaard in Sarpsborg followed. When the Norwegian Golf Federation was established in 1948, there were four golf courses in Norway: Oslo, Borregaard, Høsbjør (near Hamar) and Bergen.

In the 1950s there were 3 new courses, the 1960s brought only one new one, which was again private, before four new courses came in the 1970s. From 1985 to 1990, the number of courses more than doubled, and in this 5-year period there were added 25 new 9- and 18-hole courses.

From 1995 to 2008 the number of golf courses increased steadily from 40 to 170.

In 2009, there were 169 golf courses in Norway. In the years following the 2008 financial crisis, a discussion emerged about whether there was an over-establishment of golf courses in certain areas, and whether some of these were sustainable and were based on a sporting focus or financial interests. In 2020, it was reported that several clubs were struggling financially as a result of the financial crisis, and the use of so-called letterbox clubs was highlighted as a possible explanation. The financial crisis has also been credited with the emergence of football golf, and some golf courses were converted to this.

== Golf courses in Norway ==
Many golf courses are owned and operated by a golf club. In other cases, it may be a company that owns, takes care of the operation or leases the pitch to one or more clubs. Some golf clubs may have multiple courses. The Norwegian Golf Federation requires that all clubs must have their own course or be associated with a course.

Course	Club or company	18 holes	9 holes	6 holes	Map	Use
Repparfjord golfbane	Hammerfest og Kvalsund Golfklubb			6	70.445034°N 24.32887°E	
Varanger golfpark	Varanger Golfklubb	18			70.110107°N 29.373377°E	
Alta golfpark	Alta Golfklubb / Alta Golfpark AS		9		69.92246°N 23.09117°E	
Bleik golfstrømbane	Sportsklubben Høken / Høken Golf				69.2772°N 15.9690°E	
Karasjok golfbane, Suomageaidnu (Kárášjoga golfbána)	Karasjok Golfklubb		9		69.464213°N 25.517282°E	
Røkenes golfbane	Harstad Golfklubb		9		68.831824°N 16.486949°E	1986 - current
Hinnøy golfpark (Sørvik / Halsebø)	Hinnøy Golfklubb	18			68.6774°N 16.5146°E	Under construction
Ibestad golfbane (under development)	Ibestad Golfklubb				68.8249°N 17.2049°E	
Ilstad gard	Bodø golfklubb		9		67.277023°N 14.733404°E	
Bodø Golfpark	Salten Golfklubb	18			67.344769°N 14.539501°E	
Breimo Gård	Alsten Golfklubb			6	65.96834°N 12.56196°E	
Brønnøysund golfbane (closed)	Brønnøysund Golfklubb			6	65.547882°N 12.273754°E	2003-2012
Gulljorda golfbane	Helgeland Golfklubb		9		65.926706°N 13.308682°E	
Byneset golfsenter (north and south)	Byneset Golfklubb / Byneset Golfsenter AS	18	9		63.354162°N 10.14378°E	
Austrått golfbane	Austrått Golfklubb		9		63.70106°N 9.73642°E	
Korsnesvegen	Frosta Golfklubb			6	63.583316°N 10.803003°E	
Hitra golfbane	Hitra Frøya Golfklubb		9		63.511068°N 9.019293°E	
Sommerseter golfbane	Trondheim Golfklubb, IL Tempo Golf & Country Club		9		63.422434°N 10.334843°E	1950 - current
Klæbu golfbane	Klæbu Golfklubb		9		63.32615°N 10.482112°E	2001 - current
Kristiansund golfpark, Seivika	Kristiansund og Omegn Golfklubb		9		63.110272°N 7.852811°E	
Vigra	Giske Golfklubb			6	62.534567°N 6.126432°E	2003 - current
Bjorli golfbane (closed)	Bjorli Golfklubb		9		62.24443°N 8.21202°E	1999 - (nedlagt)
Brandsøy Planteskole	Florø Golfklubb			6	61.60986°N 5.13044°E	2005 - current
Hafjell golfbane	Hafjell golf		9		61.244475°N 10.453567°E	
Bjørnefjorden golfbane	Bjørnefjorden Golfklubb		9		60.19109°N 5.484461°E	1994 - current
Starmoen golfbane	Elverum Golfklubb	18			60.874721°N 11.66912°E	1993 - current
Hemsedal golfbane (by Grøndala river)	Hemsedal Golfklubb		9		60.923268°N 8.429637°E	
Hemsedal golfalpin golfbane (by Hemsila river)	Hallingdal Golfklubb	18	9		60.786822°N 8.742446°E	1993 - current
Atlungstad golfbane	Atlungstad Golfklubb	18	9		60.758961°N 11.080665°E	
Sillongen	Gjøvik og Toten golfklubb		9		60.697889°N 10.735669°E	2002 - current
Vestlia golfbane (closed)	Geilo Golfklubb / Vestlia Geilo Golf		9		60.524684°N 8.196497°E	1997-2021
Åstveit golfbane	Bergen Golfklubb		9		60.448933°N 5.320181°E	1937 - current
Skeievatnet golfbane	Fana Golfklubb	18			60.290782°N 5.312714°E	1988 - current
Gjerdrum golfbane	Gjerdrum Golfklubb		9		60.072954°N 11.0419°E	2010 - current
Gran golfbane	Gran Golfklubb		9		60.366547°N 10.556197°E	
Aas gaard golfpark	Hakadal Golfklubb	18	9		60.124687°N 10.835275°E	
Børve golfbane	Hardanger golfklubb			6	60.374528°N 6.185979°E	
Tyrifjord golfbane	Tyrifjord Golfklubb, Holeværingen idrettslag - Golfgruppe	18			60.052762°N 10.270642°E	1992 - current
Hauger golf	Hauger golfklubb	18		6	60.002189°N 10.984277°E	1988 - current
Hvam golfbane	Hvam Golfklubb		9		60.105746°N 11.382875°E	
Herdla golfbane	Herdla Golfklubb		9		60.563826°N 4.953737°E	
Kongsvinger golfbane	Kongsvinger Golfklubb	18	9		60.120732°N 12.052121°E	1988 - current
Leikvin golfpark	Fet Golfklubb		9		59.916468°N 11.17756°E	
Aurskog golfpark	Romerike Golfklubb	18	9		59.935807°N 11.436691°E	
Ballerud golfbane	Ballerud Golfklubb		9		59.908421°N 10.579393°E	1992 - current
Asker golfbane	Asker Golfklubb	18			59.830678°N 10.388625°E	1992 - current
Askim golfbane	Askim Golfklubb		9		59.595116°N 11.171817°E	
Borre golfbane	Borre Golfklubb	18	9		59.401987°N 10.461998°E	1989 - current
Hagebyveien	Borregaard Golfklubb		9		59.29533°N 11.13342°E	1927 - current
Skoger golfbane (Drammen golfbane)	Drammen Golfklubb	18			59.666779°N 10.223173°E	1989 - current
Belsjøveien	Drøbak Golfklubb	18			59.675177°N 10.649151°E	1988 - current
Hellerudveien, Lommedalen (at Hellerud gård)	Bærum Golfklubb	18	9		59.95811°N 10.496223°E	1972 - current
Nevjen golfbane (closed)	Eidskog Golfklubb		9		59.967291°N 12.220625°E	1995-? (closed)
Portaasen golfbane	Eiker Golfklubb		9		59.735954°N 10.012759°E	
Ekholt golfbane	Ekholtbruket Golfklubb			6	59.404696°N 10.689106°E	
Torsnesveien	Gamle Fredrikstad Golfklubb	18	9		59.204135°N 10.96103°E	
Svinskaug golfbane (closed)	Garder Golfklubb			6	59.568598°N 10.78209°E	2003-2010
Gjersjøen golfbane, Strandparken	Gjersjøen Golfklubb / Gjersjøen Golfbane AS		9		59.768568°N 10.780515°E	2003 - current
Grenland golfbane	Grenland og omegn golfklubb(Grenland golfklubb until 2013)	18		6	59.268623°N 9.570432°E	1994-2013, 2013 - current
Grini golfane	Grini Golfklubb		9		59.950568°N 10.625226°E	
Groruddalen golfbane	Groruddalen Golfklubb		9		59.968142°N 10.91439°E	1988 - current
Grønmo golfbane	Grønmo Golfklubb		9		59.843596°N 10.859824°E	
Haga golfpark	Haga Golf AS / Haga Golfklubb	18	9		59.944142°N 10.579993°E	
Halden golfbane	Halden Golfklubb	18	9		59.119056°N 11.40942°E	1990 - current
Sveio golfpark	Haugaland Golfklubb	18			59.549969°N 5.365352°E	
Haugesund golfpark	Haugesund golfklubb		9		59.392444°N 5.352649°E	
Hof golfbane	Hof Golfklubb		9		59.536368°N 10.088357°E	
Holtsmark golfbane	Holtsmark Golfklubb	18	9		59.872619°N 10.265424°E	
Ørnefjell golfbane	Hovden Golfklubb		9		59.493631°N 7.398123°E	
Myhrene gård golfbane (closed)	Hurum Golfklubb (course has been closed, and members transferred to Kjekstad Golfklubb )		9		59.548115°N 10.449961°E	1999-2018
Kjekstad golfbane	Kjekstad Golfklubb	18	9		59.74907°N 10.37994°E	1976 - current
Huseby og Hankø golfbane	Huseby og Hankø Golfklubb		9		59.266938°N 10.790666°E	
Husøy golfbane	Husøy Golfklubb		9		59.239267°N 10.46707°E	
Hvaler golfbane	Hvaler Golfklubb		9	6	59.051329°N 11.023836°E	
Grimstad golfbane	Grimstad Golfklubb		9		58.356447°N 8.629191°E	
Kjelland golfbane	Dalane Golfklubb			6	58.338571°N 6.29779°E	2000 - current
Bamble golfpark	Bamble Golfklubb		9		58.951829°N 9.595258°E	
Nes Verk golfpark	Arendal og Omegn Golfklubb	18	9		58.625143°N 8.855195°E	1986 - current
Bjaavann golfbane	Bjaavann Golfklubb	18			58.238908°N 8.054403°E	
Maurholen golfpark	Egersund golfklubb		9		58.4892°N 5.915159°E	
Gumøy golfbane	Gumøy golf		9		58.89240°N 9.52259°E	
Jæren golfbane	Jæren Golfklubb		9	6	58.703169°N 5.694212°E	
Skudeneshavn	Karmøy Golfklubb		9		59.153625°N 5.24918°E	1989 - current
(missing info)	Kirkenes Golfklubb				(missing info)	2009 - current
Kongsberg golfbane	Kongsberg Golfbane	18	9	6	59.615644°N 9.716024°E	1992 - current
Krokhol golfbane	Krokhol golfklubb	18	9		59.802302°N 10.926213°E	1985 - current
Kragerø golfbane	Kragerø Golfklubb	18		6	58.847199°N 9.397247°E	
Randesund golfbane	Kristiansand Golfklubb		9		58.141949°N 8.081035°E	1973 - current
Utsikten golfpark	Utsikten Golfklubb	18	9	6	58.30904°N 6.994075°E	1992 - current
Undarheim golfbane	Kvinnherad Golfklubb		9		59.861699°N 5.76528°E	
Kvitfjell golfbane	Kvitfjell golf	18			61.472858°N 10.169324°E	2001-2010
Randsfjorden golfpark	Land Golfklubb				60.6400°N 10.3715°E	
(without course)	Langhus golfklubb (part of Langhus idrettslag)				(without course)	
Larvik golfbane (at Fritzøe Gård)	Larvik Golfklubb	18	9		59.032681°N 10.013685°E	1988 - current
Lillehammer golfpark	Lillehammer Golf Park AS		9	6	61.127063°N 10.471591°E	
Lillestrøm golfbane	Lillestrøm Golfklubb			6	59.955362°N 11.073994°E	
Lofoten links / Lofoten golfbane	Lofoten golfklubb		9		68.341336°N 14.137205°E	1998 - current
Lommedalsveien, Lommedalen	Lommedalen Golfklubb		9		59.965843°N 10.469444°E	
Losby gods (Vestmork og Østmork golfbane)	Losby Golfklubb	18	9		59.895121°N 10.986681°E	
Sløgrandane golfbane, Ljøsne	Lærdal golfklubb		9		61.0438°N 7.6263°E	Planned
Rikheim golfbane, Ljøsne (closed)	Lærdal golfklubb			6	61.0399°N 7.6233°E	2000-2019
Utlarangen, Utladalen (Årdal driving range)	Lærdal golfklubb				61.3246°N 7.8532°E	In use
Lønne golfbane (closed?)	Lønne Golfklubb (closed?)		9		58.890641°N 9.270132°E	2003-2019
Mandal golfbane	Mandal Golfklubb		9		58.036788°N 7.421426°E	1993 - current
Meland golfbane	Meland Golfklubb	18			60.542177°N 5.085564°E	1995 - current
Finnkroken golfpark	Midt-Troms Golfklubb			6	68.9888°N 18.5182°E	
Miklagard golfbane	Miklagard Golfklubb	18		6	60.079127°N 11.155767°E	
Mjøsen golfbane	Mjøsen Golfklubb	18			60.951472°N 10.693678°E	1991 - current
Moa golfsenter	Ålesund golfklubb			6	62.462606°N 6.36249°E	
Modum golfbane	Modum Golfklubb		9		59.968338°N 10.013942°E	
Eikrem golfbane	Molde Golfklubb		9	6	62.75379°N 7.257318°E	1990 - current
Evje golfpark	Moss og Rygge Golfklubb	18			59.368112°N 10.683613°E	
Mørk golfbane	Mørk Golfklubb	18	9	6	59.529166°N 11.001358°E	
Namsen golfbane	Namdal Golfklubb		9		64.488648°N 11.994614°E	
Sævik golfbane	Namsos Golfklubb			6	64.42921°N 11.491432°E	
Skjomen golfpark	Narvik Golfklubb	18			68.240856°N 17.41568°E	1992 - current
Rommen golfpark	Nes Golfklubb	18		6	60.161737°N 11.426992°E	1988 - current
Nesbyen golfbane	Nesbyen Golfklubb / Nesfjellet golf				60.5340°N 9.0248°E	
Stokkenes golfpark	Nordfjord Golfklubb		9		61.9103°N 6.012043°E	
Nordhaug golfbane	Nordhaug Golfklubb		9		59.9374°N 10.571°E	
Nordvegen golfbane	Nordvegen Golfklubb / Sveio Golfpark	18			59.396859°N 5.246992°E	
Norefjell golfbane	Norefjell Golfklubb	18	9		60.186929°N 9.607362°E	1993 - current
Norsjø golfpark	Norsjø Golfklubb	18	9	6	59.303287°N 9.263525°E	1992 - current
Banak links golfpark	North Cape Golf Club		9	6	70.069537°N 24.988740°E	
Nærøysund golfbane	Nærøysund Golfklubb			6	64.856386°N 11.291125°E	
Nøtterøy golfbane	Nøtterøy golf	18		6	59.226386°N 10.4002°E	
Røldal golfbane	Odda Golfklubb				planned	
Eitrheimsvågen golfbane	Odda Golfklubb			6	60.092048°N 6.530654°E	2000-2021
Ogna golfbane	Ogna Golfklubb		9		58.523158°N 5.795364°E	
Onsøy golfbane	Onsøy Golfklubb	18			59.270625°N 10.790453°E	1987 - current
Oppdal golfbane, Fritidsparken	Oppdal Golfklubb		9		62.595638°N 9.709758°E	1988 - current
Oppegård golfbane	Oppegård Golfklubb	18			59.771831°N 10.813389°E	1985 - current
Bogstad golfbane	Oslo Golfklubb	18			59.961741°N 10.639817°E	1925 - current
Oustøen golfbane	Oustøen Country Club	18	9		59.868915°N 10.584116°E	1965 - current
Polarsirkelen golfpark	Mo i Rana			6	66.314524°N 13.979364°E	
Jøssangmyra golfbane	Preikestolen Golfklubb		9		58.992932°N 6.101738°E	
Tungenes golfbane	Randaberg Golfklubb		9	6	59.026508°N 5.589414°E	
Randsfjorden golfpark	Randsfjorden Golfpark AS / Land Golfklubb	18			60.645377°N 10.36645°E	1985 - current
Rauma golfbane, Setnesmoen	Rauma Golfklubb		9		62.55064°N 7.692116°E	
Re golfbane	Tønsberg Golfklubb (formerly Re Golfklubb)		9		59.337587°N 10.301181°E	
Ringerike golfbane	Ringerike Golfklubb		9		60.34914°N 10.103315°E	
Rjukan golfbane, Miland	Rjukan Golfklubb				59.9283°N 8.7630°E	
Rygge flystasjon	Rygge Flystasjon Golf Club			6	59.386533°N 10.773009°E	
Røros golfbane, Bergstaden	Røros Golfklubb		9		62.591246°N 11.361893°E	
Sandane golfbane	Sandane Golfklubb / Sandane Golfpark		9		61.761469°N 6.239603°E	1999 - current
Sande golfbane	Sande Golfklubb		9		59.602527°N 10.227984°E	
Sandefjord golfbane	Sandefjord Golfklubb	18			59.110399°N 10.181533°E	
Bærheim golfpark	Sandnes Golfklubb / Golf Management	18		6	58.870339°N 5.687926°E	
Sauda golfbane	Sauda Golfklubb		9		59.647540°N 6.319670°E	
Selbu golfbane (nedlagt)	Selbu Golfklubb (using Stjørdal golfbane from 2015)		9		63.191366°N 11.096569°E	1998-2015
Selje golfpark	Selje Golfklubb		9		62.040044°N 5.366212°E	
Sirdal fjellgolf, Kvæven i Øre Sirdal	Sirdal Golfklubb				58.9406°N 6.9166°E	
Golfbane på Evjemoen leir (closed)	Setesdal Golfklubb			6	58.56714°N 7.78484°E	2000-2006
Skei golfbane, Skeikampen	Skei Golfklubb	18	9		61.336853°N 10.090118°E	1993 - current
Smerta golfbane	Ski Golfklubb		9		59.71967°N 10.919114°E	
Hevingen Fritidspark	Skjeberg Golfklubb	18			59.276278°N 11.197901°E	1986 - current
Dyrnesdalen golfbane	Smøla Golfklubb		9		63.423881°N 7.858134°E	
Forus golfbane	Sola Golfklubb	18	9		58.891643°N 5.695887°E	1993 - current
Solastranden golfbane	Sola Golfklubb	18			58.874588°N 5.614091°E	
Solnør golfbane	Ålesund golfklubb	18	9		62.489265°N 6.727186°E	1990 - current
Solum golfbane, Holmestrand	Solum Golfklubb	18			59.466676°N 10.315896°E	
Soon golfbane, Son	Soon Golfklubb / Soon Golfbane AS		9	6	59.532281°N 10.680145°E	
Sorknes golfbane	Sorknes Golfklubb	18		6	61.170162°N 11.337582°E	1990 - current
Sotra golfbane	Sotra Golfklubb / Sotra Golfpark AS		9		60.35304°N 5.087610°E	
Stavanger golfbane	Stavanger Golfklubb	18			58.955998°N 5.667563°E	1956 - current
Midjo golfbane	Steinkjer Golfklubb		9		64.019659°N 11.529714°E	2001 - current
Trones golfbane	Stiklestad Golfklubb	18		6	63.817607°N 11.428948°E	1991 - current
Stjørdal golfbane	Stjørdal Golfklubb	18			63.486685°N 10.926903°E	2000 - current
Stord golfbane	Stord Golfklubb / Stord Golfpark / Stord Golfbane AS		9	6	59.807867°N 5.515622°E	1992 - current
Overvoll golfbane	Stranda Golfklubb			6	62.228178°N 6.902302°E	
Sætre golfbane (closed)	Stryn Golfklubb (now using Stokkenes golfpark at Nordfjord Golfklubb)			6	61.911465°N 6.769865°E	2000-? (closed)
Suldal golfbane, Lindum	Suldal Golfklubb				planned	
Sunndal golfbane, Trædal gård	Sunndal Golfklubb			6	62.66524°N 8.539136°E	
Sunnfjord golfbane	Sunnfjord Golfklubb		9		61.487973°N 6.080559°E	
Sunnmøre golfbane	Sunnmøre Golfklubb		9		62.359408°N 6.075066°E	
Surnadal golfpark, at Mo by Kvanne	Surnadal Golfklubb		9		62.896275°N 8.563555°E	
(missing info)	Sykkylven Golfklubb				(missing info)	
Øydegard golfbane	Tingvoll Golfklubb				63.0097°N 7.9987°E	
Tjøme golfbane	Tjøme Golfklubb / Rød Golf AS	18	9		59.111329°N 10.392865°E	1989 - current
Tromsø golfpark	Tromsø Golfklubb	18	9		69.652582°N 19.593314°E	
Trysilfjellet golfbane	Trysil Golfklubb	18			61.304357°N 12.245091°E	
Dalen golfbane, Tysnes	Tysnes golf			6	60.0162°N 5.5497°E	
Kjos golfbane	Ullensaker Golfklubb		9		60.153534°N 11.101912°E	
Valdres golfbane, Aurdalsvannet	Valdres Golfklubb		9	6	60.92691°N 9.339035°E	
Eidsåvoll stadion, Syvdsfjorden	Vanylven Golfklubb / Vanylven Golfpark		9		62.114725°N 5.671576°E	1998-
Vesterålen golfbane, Kjerringnes	Vesterålen Golfklubb			6	68.663639°N 15.47711°E	1999-
Volda golfbane, Vassbotnen	Volda Golfklubb		9		62.140757°N 6.132251°E	
Øvredalen golfbane (closed)	Vildmarken Golfklubb		9		60.285761°N 5.550619°E	2000-2016
Voss golf- og aktivitetspark	Voss Golfklubb / Voss Golbaner AS		9		60.679518°N 6.485015°E	
Aas gaard golfpark	Hakadal golfklubb				60.1310°N 10.8378°E	
Vear, Sandefjord	Vestfold Golfklubb	18	9		59.242635°N 10.356137°E	1958 - current
Veierland golfbane	Veierland Golfklubb				59.1646°N 10.3519°E	
Vrådal golfbane	Vrådal Golfklubb			6	59.31035°N 8.44292°E	
Østmarka golfbane	Østmarka Golfklubb	18			59.724459°N 11.04187°E	1989 - current
Øya golfpark, Hafslundsøy	Øya Golfpark (pay and play)				59.303498°N 11.151295°E	
Utsikten golfpark	Utsikten Golfklubb				58.3109°N 6.9926°E	
