= Kenton County Golf Course =

Coordinates: 38.968°N 84.584°W

Kenton County Golf Course is a golf course in Kentucky. It is located at 3908 Richardson Road, Independence, KY 41051.The golf course is a 54-hole facility. It has three courses: The Pioneer, The Willows, and Fox Run. All three of the courses accommodate low handicapper players.The Pioneer is the shortest of the courses, playing to a par 71. The Pioneer was the first course built at the complex in 1968. The Pioneer course is 5,880 yards with a rating of 68.4, and a slope of 115. It is like most mid-western courses, slightly sloping on the front nine with increasing slopes on the back. The Willows, designed by Dr. Michael Hurdzan, gives golfers a scenic and challenging test of tree-lined fairways and undulating greens. The Willows course plays to 6,697 yards from the championship tees and is rated 9th among Kentucky courses. It has a par of 72, the course rating is 72.6 and the slope is 137. Power carts are optional, and are permitted to cross at 90 degrees to the direction of play.

Fox Run, designed by renowned architect Arthur Hills, is a distinctively different golf course which provides various blends of architectural style from hole to hole. On this nine are holes which somewhat resemble those of a typical Scottish golf course. There are Carolina type holes with drastic changes in elevation from tee to green. There are also more traditional mid-western style golf holes. There is an absence of housing and condo development within the course complex. This course is consistently rated one of the most challenging public courses in the State of Kentucky. Kenton County Golf Course also has a driving range and a clubhouse with a pro-shop, a bar, and a wide variety of food on offer. Billy Casper Golf was named as the new management company for all three golf courses in December 2019.

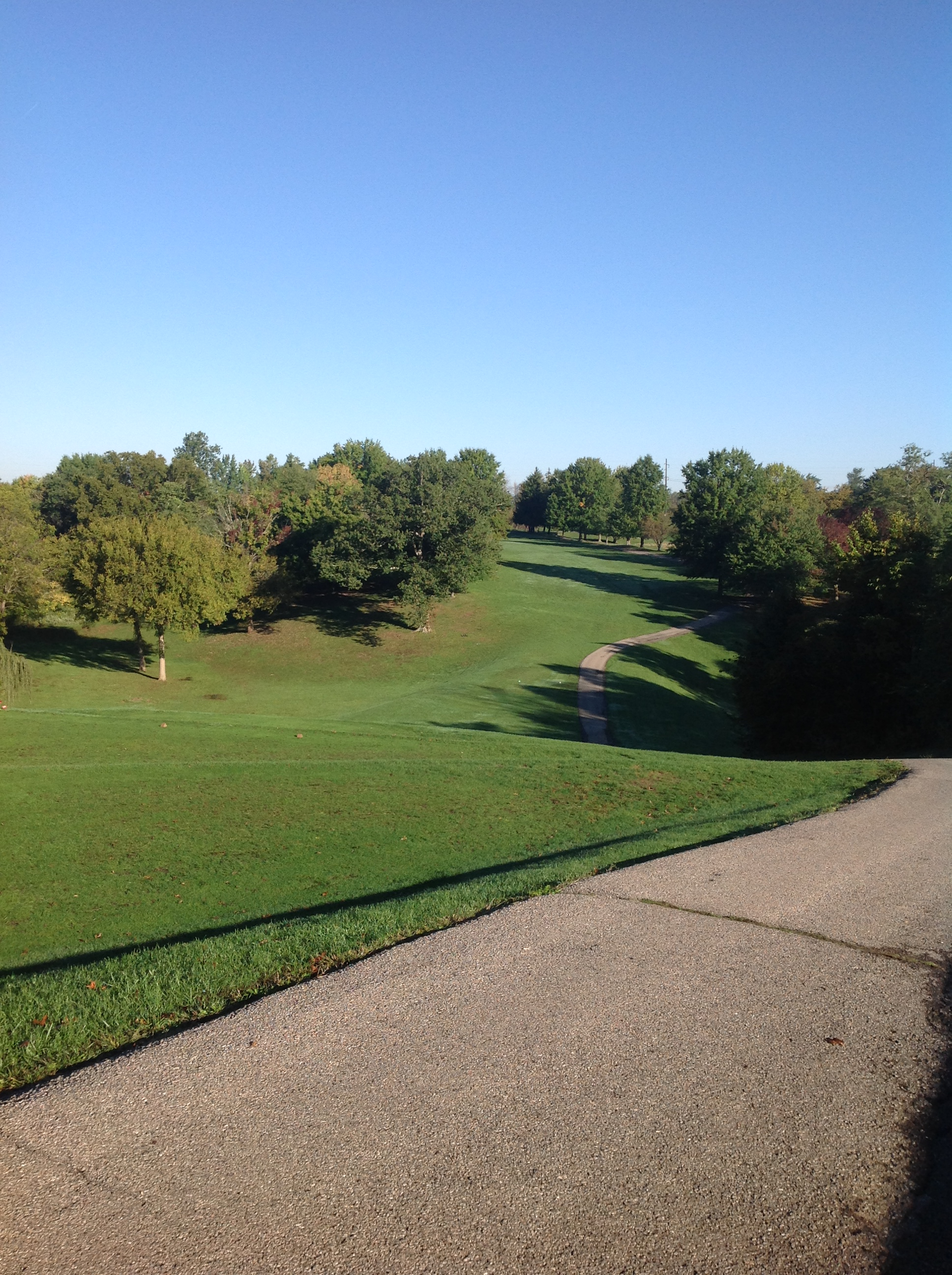
The Willows Golf Course
