= Rocky Point Golf Course =

Public golf course in Tampa, Florida

- Interactive map of Rocky Point Golf Course
- 27°58′35″N 82°33′19″W

Club information
- Location: Tampa, Florida, United States
- Established: 1911
- Type: Public
- Owner: Tampa Sports Authority
- Operator: Tampa Sports Authority
- Total holes: 18
- Website: www.rockypointgolf.net
- Designed by: Willie Black, Ron Garl
- Par: 71
- Length: 6,328 yards
- Course rating: 71.7

Rocky Point Golf Course is a public 18-hole golf course in Tampa, Florida that is managed by the Tampa Sports Authority.

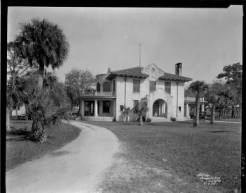
Rocky Point Golf Club clubhouse circa 1923

== History ==
Rocky Point Golf Course was established in 1911 by the Tampa Automobile Club as the Tampa Automobile and Golf Club, and changed its name to the Rocky Point Golf Club in 1917. It was one of the first golf courses in the state of Florida. The course originally opened in 1912 with the first 9 holes, and construction was completed in 1913. The course was open for 31 years until the US entered World War II in 1942. During the war, the Federal Government closed the course for use as part of Drew Field and built barracks on the property to house prisoners of war. The course also served at this time as recreation for the servicemen stationed at Drew Field.

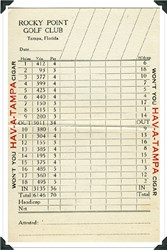
RPGC Cigar Advertising Scorecard, 1928

In 1953, the Federal Government turned the property over to the City of Tampa. The City then leased it to J.S. Curly Hurtman for 25 years, who reopened the course with his wife, Merle, in 1954. Merle took over operations when Curly passed in 1957.

In 1963, a third stretch of 9 holes was added. The land which originally housed the additional 9 holes is now home to ConnectWise and Labtech Software.

A community was developed south of the golf course in the late 1950s called Dana Shores. Later, in the 1970s, construction began on another development to the southeast of the course called Pelican Island. Today, both neighborhoods still exist and are thriving community partners for Rocky Point Golf Course.

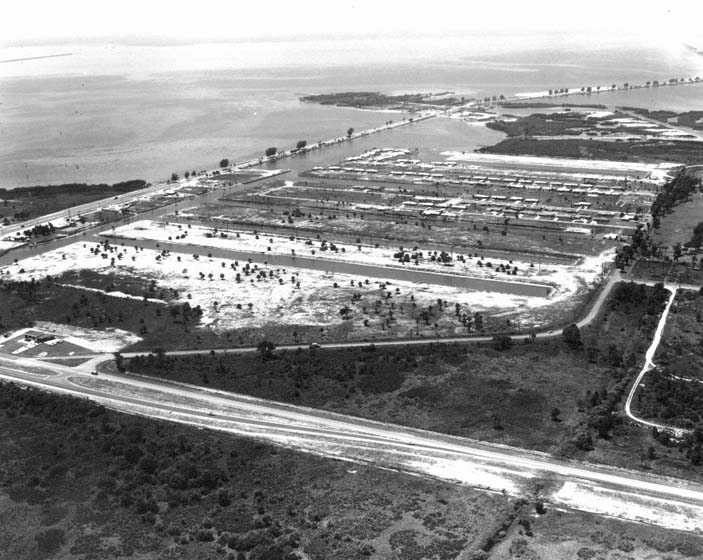
Dana Shores circa 1959

Once the lease expired with the Hurtmans in 1978, the City turned over operations to the Tampa Sports Authority – a special district that was created in 1965 by Governor Hayden Burns for the purpose of planning, developing and maintaining a comprehensive complex of sports and recreational facilities for the Tampa Bay area. In December 1981, Mayor Bob Martinez leased 40+ acres of Rocky Point Golf Course to Critikon Corporation for 99 years in return for a 1.2 million dollar redesign. This included the return from 27 holes to 18 holes. The course reopened on March 5, 1983. The current clubhouse was built and opened in July, 1993.

As of 2016, the Tampa Sports Authority manages Rocky Point, along with Babe Zaharias Golf Course, Rogers Park Golf Course and Raymond James Stadium.

The 18-hole, par-71 Course consists of four sets of tees. The golf course was closed in 2015 to update it to more modern standards.
