= Ladera Golf Course =

American golf club

- Interactive map of Ladera Golf Course
- 35.1204°N 106.7124°W

Club information
- Location: Albuquerque, New Mexico, U.S.
- Established: 1980
- Type: Public
- Owner: City of Albuquerque
- Tota holes: 18 Championship Course; 9-hole Executive Course
- Website: Ladera Golf Course

Championship Course
- Designed by: Richard M. Phelps
- Par: 72
- Length: 7,107 yards (6,499 m)
- Course rating: 73

Executive Course
- Designed by: Richard M. Phelps
- Par: 31
- Length: 2,053 yards (1,877 m)
- Course rating: 58

Ladera Golf Course is a municipal golf facility in owned by the city of Albuquerque, New Mexico. It is located on the West Mesa of Albuquerque and was opened in 1980.

Ladera includes an 18-hole golf course, a 9-hole executive course, a driving range, practice putting greens, and four lakes.

Measuring 7,107 yards from the longest tees, Ladera has the longest playing yardage of any municipal course in Albuquerque.
