= Janesville Country Club =

Coordinates: 42°41′40″N 89°03′18″W

The Janesville Country Club is a private golf and social club located in the Town of Janesville, just outside the northwest city limits of Janesville, Wisconsin. Founded in 1894 by Alexander Galbraith who brought golf clubs and balls back to Janesville from Scotland, it is the first golf club in Wisconsin, the second in the Midwest and the sixth in the U.S.
