= Paradisus Puerto Rico =

All-inclusive resort in Puerto Rico, located in the municipality of Río Grande

Paradisus Puerto Rico is the first all-inclusive resort in Puerto Rico, located in the municipality of Río Grande in the Coco Beach area. Construction began on the hotel by the Sol Melia hotel chain in 2002 at a $100 million investment. The resort opened in March 2004 with a lagoon-style swimming pool, three tennis courts, a fitness center, a full-service spa, an air-conditioned amphitheatre, two 18-hole golf courses, and a casino.
