= Red Rocks Country Club =

Country club in Colorado, U.S.

Coordinates: 39°37′14″N 105°10′56″W

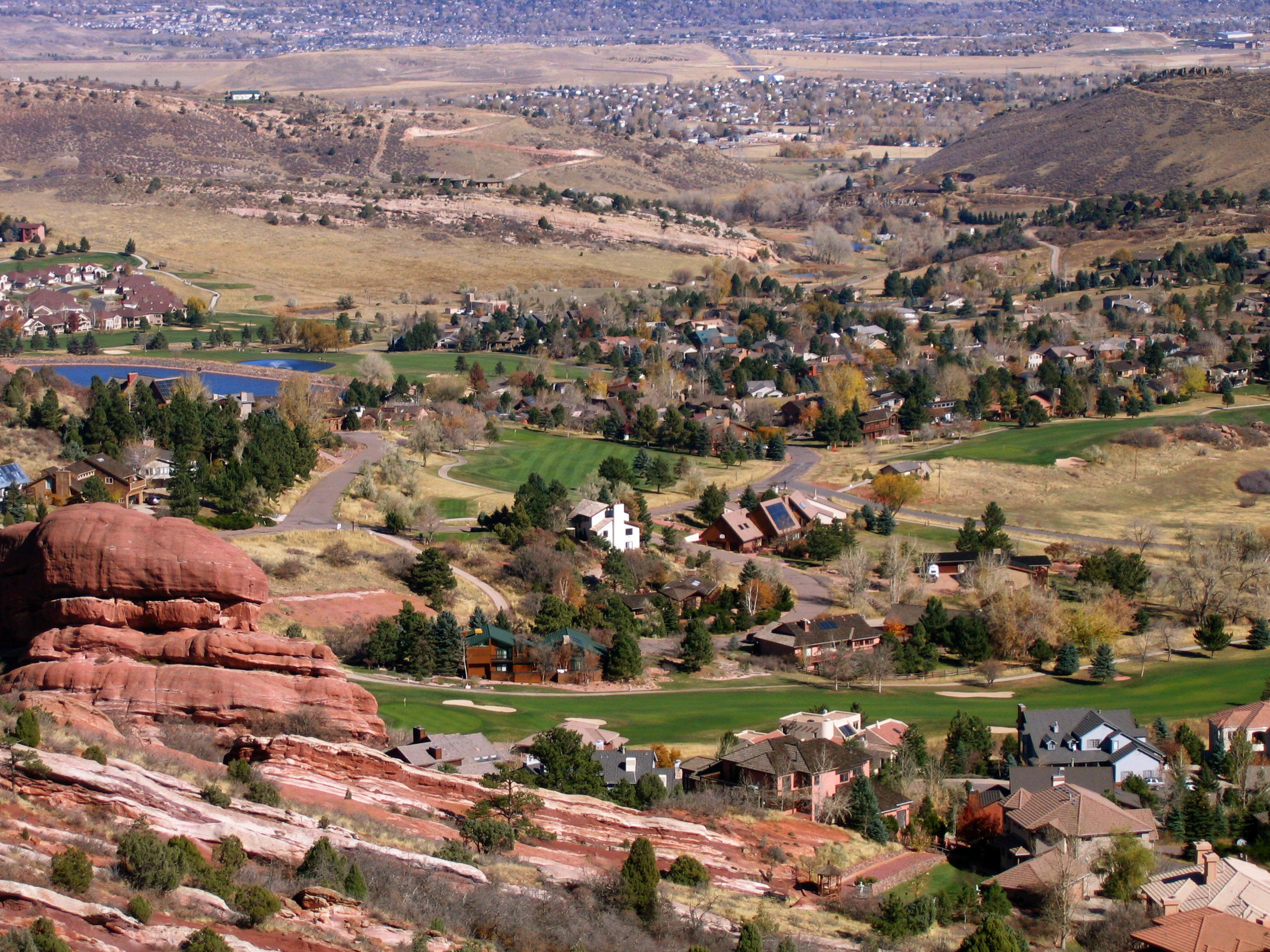
Above the 16th Green.

Red Rocks Country Club is a private golf and country club located in Jefferson County, just outside Morrison, Colorado in the foothills of the Rocky Mountains. Challenging course with beautiful views of surrounding foothills and downtown Denver exist from the golf course, clubhouse and restaurant patio.
