= Country Club at Wakefield Plantation =

Private golf club in Raleigh, North Carolina

Coordinates: 35.9550°N 78.5649°W

The Country Club at Wakefield Plantation
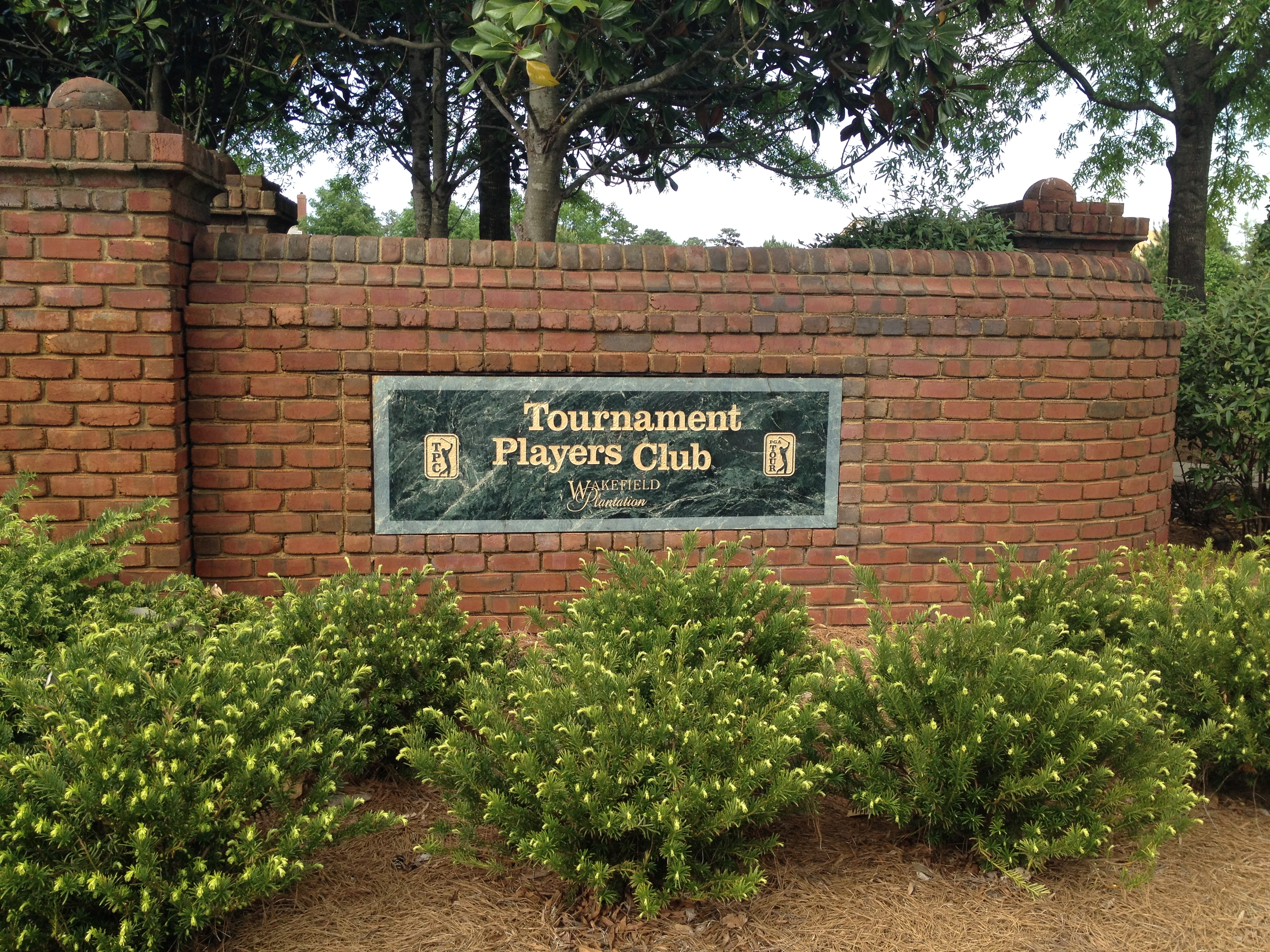
- Course entrance
- Interactive map of The Country Club at Wakefield Plantation

Club information
- Location: Raleigh, North Carolina, United States
- Established: 2000
- Type: Private
- Owner: McConnell Golf
- Operator: McConnell Golf
- Tota holes: 18
- Tournaments: Rex Hospital Open
- Website: www.ccwakefieldplantation.com
- Designed by: Hale Irwin
- Par: 71
- Length: 7,257 yards
- Course rating: 75.5

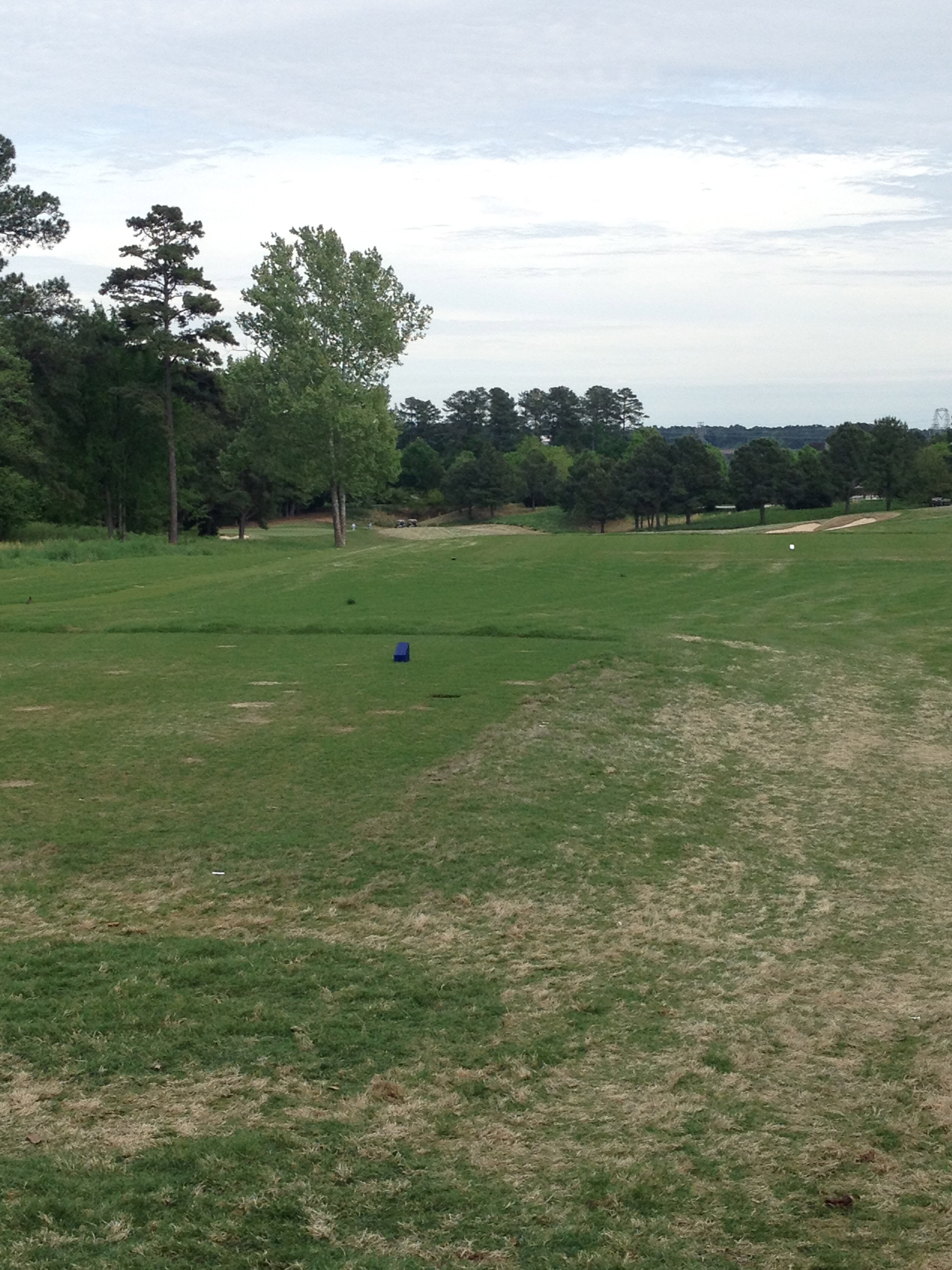
1st Hole

The Country Club at Wakefield Plantation is a private golf club located within the planned community of Wakefield Plantation in Raleigh, North Carolina. Formerly named TPC Wakefield Plantation as a member of the Tournament Players Club network operated by the PGA Tour, it was purchased by McConnell Golf in 2011.

The Hale Irwin designed championship golf course, built adjacent to Falls Lake, opened in 2000. It is accompanied by a par 33, 9-hole course.

The Country Club at Wakefield Plantation is the home of the Rex Hospital Open, formerly the SAS Carolina Classic, a tournament on the second tier Web.com Tour.

== Sports Club ==
The Country Club at Wakefield Plantation Sports Club offers three swimming pools: an eight-lane Olympic-style pool, a recreational pool with water slide and a "kiddie" pool, eight state-of-the-art hydro-clay tennis courts, children's playground, 9-hole practice golf course, casual bar & grill, fitness center, locker rooms and showers, covered outdoor party area, and shade pavilion.
