= Sports in the New York metropolitan area =

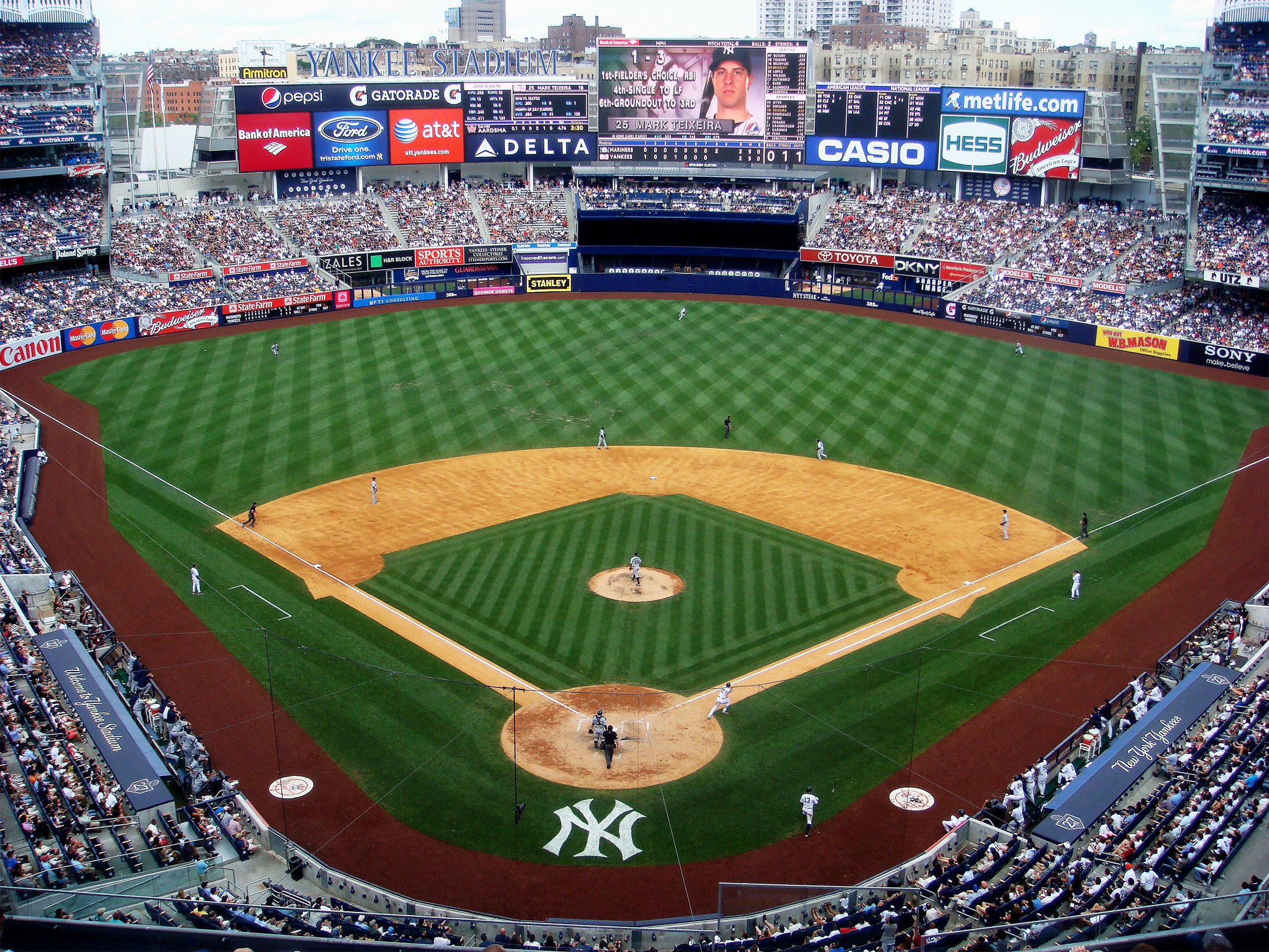
Yankee Stadium, home of the New York Yankees (MLB)

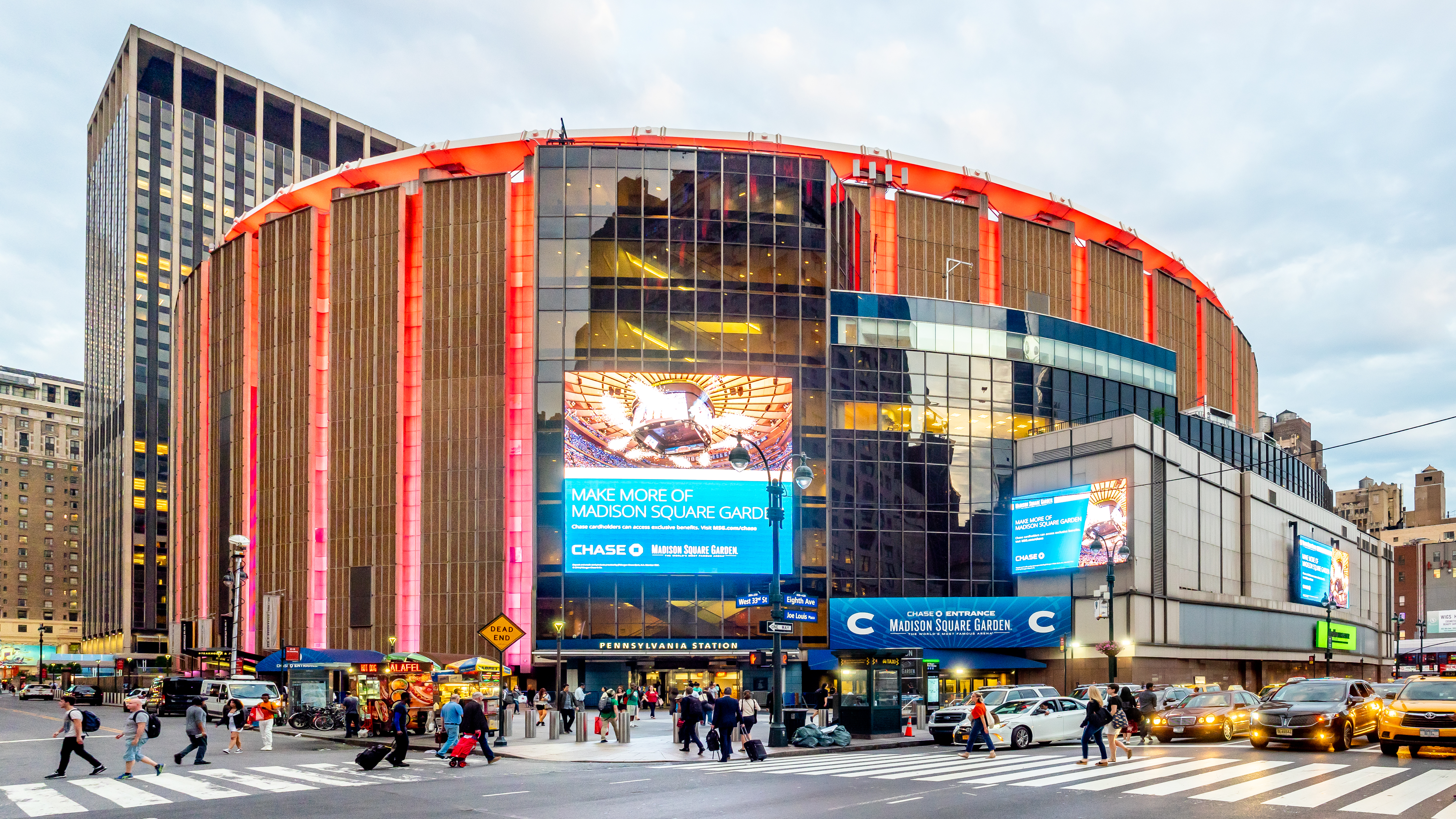
Madison Square Garden, home of the New York Knicks (NBA) and New York Rangers (NHL)

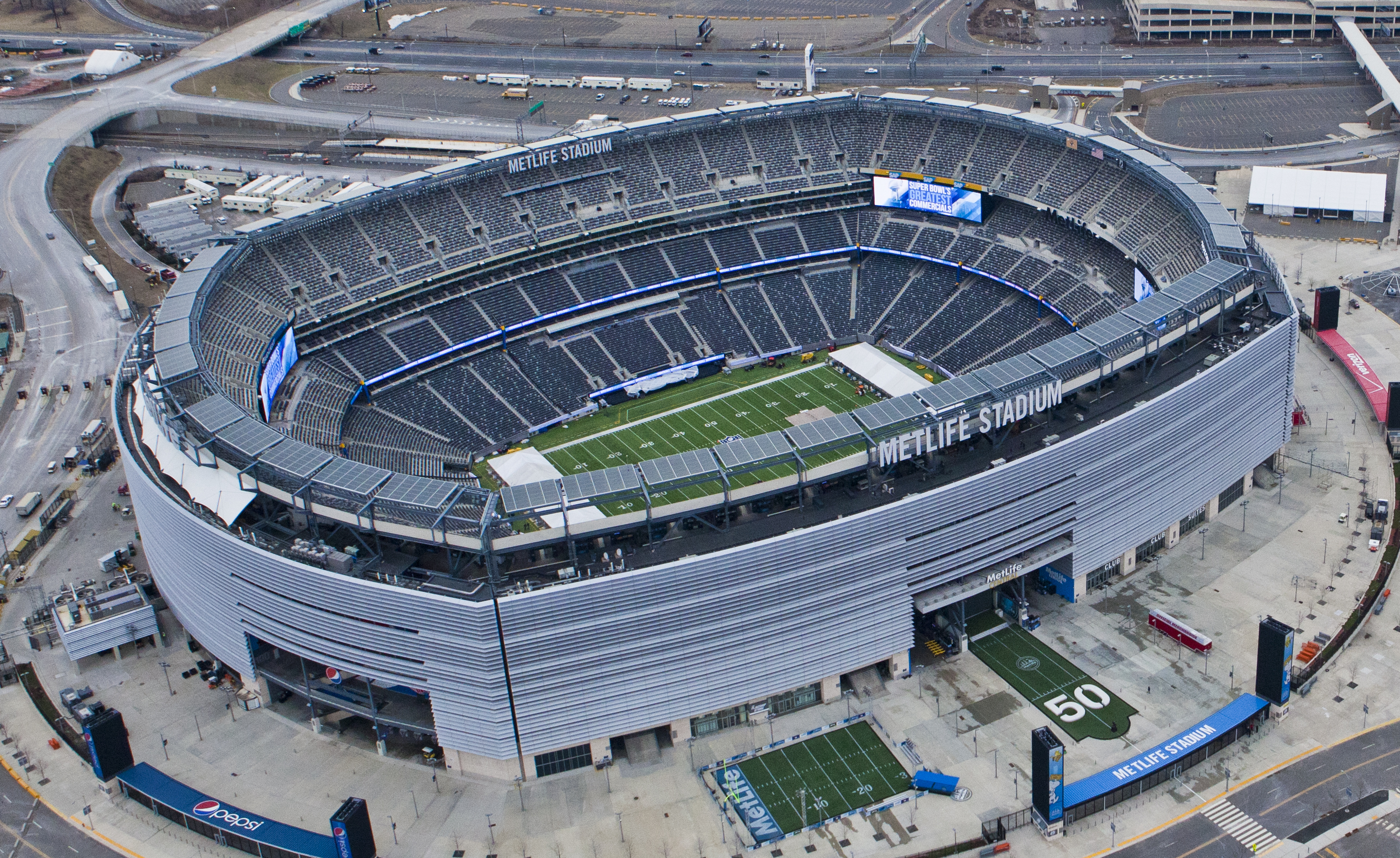
MetLife Stadium, home of the New York Giants (NFL) and New York Jets (NFL)

The New York metropolitan area in the Northeastern region of the United States is home to several professional and amateur sports teams. The area is one of two in the US to host two teams from all five major professional sports leagues in the United States and Canada (the other being the Greater Los Angeles area).

The area is home to the New York Yankees and New York Mets of Major League Baseball (MLB), the New York Knicks and Brooklyn Nets of the National Basketball Association (NBA), the New York Giants and New York Jets of the National Football League (NFL), the New York Rangers, New York Islanders, and New Jersey Devils of the National Hockey League (NHL), and New York City FC and the New York Red Bulls of Major League Soccer (MLS). In women's major sports leagues, the area hosts the New York Liberty of the Women's National Basketball Association (WNBA) and Gotham FC of the National Women's Soccer League (NWSL). New York City is the headquarters of all five major professional sports leagues (MLB, NBA, NFL, NHL, MLS) as well as the WNBA and NWSL.

New York City is home to five universities whose teams compete in various NCAA Division I level sports. The city hosts the US Open, one of the four Grand Slam tennis tournaments, and the New York City Marathon, among the world's largest. The Millrose Games is an annual track and field meet whose featured event is the Wanamaker Mile. Boxing is also prominent, with events like the New York Golden Gloves being held. The New York metropolitan area hosted the 1996 World Cup of Hockey, the 1998 Goodwill Games, the 1984 Summer Paralympics, and the 2026 FIFA World Cup final.

New York metropolitan area sports teams have been crowned champions of their respective leagues on 69 occasions, most recently being the 2025–26 New York Knicks. When the Knicks won the 2026 NBA Finals, the New York metropolitan area became the third city in the 21st century (after Boston and Los Angeles) to have at least one championship in the "Big Four" sports leagues. If MLS is counted, the New York metropolitan area would be the second city after Los Angeles to win a championship in the "Big Four" and MLS in the 21st century.

== Major professional league teams ==
The following teams compete in a major professional league.

Team	League	Venue	Location	Founded	Titles	Local Cable Network
New York Yankees	Major League Baseball (MLB)	Yankee Stadium	The Bronx, NYC	1901	27	YES Network
New York Mets	Major League Baseball (MLB)	Citi Field	Queens, NYC	1962	2	SNY
New York Knicks	National Basketball Association (NBA)	Madison Square Garden	Manhattan, NYC	1946	3	MSG Network
Brooklyn Nets	National Basketball Association (NBA)	Barclays Center	Brooklyn, NYC	1967	2	YES Network
New York Giants	National Football League (NFL)	MetLife Stadium	East Rutherford, New Jersey	1925	8	MSG Network
New York Jets	National Football League (NFL)	MetLife Stadium	East Rutherford, New Jersey	1960	2	SNY
New York Rangers	National Hockey League (NHL)	Madison Square Garden	Manhattan, NYC	1926	4	MSG Network
New York Islanders	National Hockey League (NHL)	UBS Arena	Elmont, New York	1972	4	MSG Sportsnet
New Jersey Devils	National Hockey League (NHL)	Prudential Center	Newark, New Jersey	1982	3	MSG Sportsnet
New York City FC	Major League Soccer (MLS)	Etihad Park	Queens, NYC	2013	1	Apple TV
New York Red Bulls	Major League Soccer (MLS)	Sports Illustrated Stadium	Harrison, New Jersey	1995	0	Apple TV

== Other highest-level professional league teams ==
The following teams compete in a highest-level professional league.

New York Liberty	Women's National Basketball Association (WNBA)	Barclays Center	Brooklyn, NYC	1997	1	YES Network
Gotham FC	National Women's Soccer League (NWSL)	Sports Illustrated Stadium (Etihad Park starting 2028)	Harrison, New Jersey	2006	3	Paramount+
MI New York	Major League Cricket (MLC)	Marine Park Cricket Stadium (planned)	Brooklyn, NYC	2023	2	
New York Sirens	Professional Women's Hockey League (PWHL)	Prudential Center	Newark, New Jersey	2023	0	ESPN
New York Heights	Women's Pro Baseball League (WPBL)		New York	2026	0	None

Major sports venues in the New York metropolitan area
Major sports venues in the New York metropolitan area, including teams that play at each location
1 Barclays Center (Nets, Liberty)
2 Citi Field (Mets) and Etihad Park (future home of New York City FC and Gotham FC)
3 Madison Square Garden (Knicks, Rangers)
4 MetLife Stadium (Giants, Jets)
5 Prudential Center (Devils, Sirens)
6 Sports Illustrated Stadium (Red Bulls, Gotham FC)
7 UBS Arena (Islanders)
8 Yankee Stadium (Yankees, New York City FC)

There have been 14 World Series baseball championship series between New York City teams, in matchups called Subway Series. New York is one of three metropolitan areas to have two baseball teams (Chicago and Los Angeles being the others). The city's two current Major League Baseball teams are the New York Yankees and the New York Mets. The city also was once home to the New York Giants (now the San Francisco Giants) and the Brooklyn Dodgers (now the Los Angeles Dodgers). There is also one Minor League Baseball team in the city, the Brooklyn Cyclones, with numerous independent minor league teams throughout the metro area.

Basketball is one of the most widely played recreation sports in the city, and professional basketball is also widely followed. The city's National Basketball Association teams are the long-established New York Knicks and the Brooklyn Nets, who became the first sports team representing Brooklyn in over 50 years when they moved to the borough from New Jersey for the 2012–13 NBA season. The city's Women's National Basketball Association team is the New York Liberty, who won the 2024 WNBA Finals, the first college or pro basketball team from the New York City area to win a championship since 1973, when the Knicks won. The first national basketball championship for major colleges, the National Invitation Tournament, was held in New York in 1938, and its semifinal and final rounds remain in the city. Rucker Park in Harlem is a celebrated court where many professional athletes play in the summer league. Because of the city's strong historical connections with both professional and college basketball, the New York Knicks' home arena, Madison Square Garden, is often called the "Mecca of basketball."

Football is the city's second most followed sport, behind baseball. Football is actually the second most popular sport in the suburbs and the most popular when it includes upstate New York as well. The city is represented in the National Football League by the New York Giants and New York Jets. Both teams play at MetLife Stadium in nearby East Rutherford, New Jersey. In 2014, the stadium hosted Super Bowl XLVIII. The teams have an intra-city rivalry.

Ice hockey in New York is also widely popular and closely followed. There are three National Hockey League teams in the metro area. The New York Rangers play in Manhattan, calling Madison Square Garden home. The New York Islanders play in UBS Arena in Elmont. The New Jersey Devils also play in the New York metro area, playing in Newark, New Jersey. The Islanders' American Hockey League affiliate, the Bridgeport Islanders, are based in southwest Connecticut. As of 2024, New York Sirens of the Professional Women's Hockey League share the New Jersey Devils' home arena.

In soccer, New York is represented by three teams in the top divisions for men and women, including the New York Red Bulls and New York City FC of Major League Soccer, and Gotham FC of the National Women's Soccer League. The Red Bulls play their home games at Sports Illustrated Stadium in Harrison, New Jersey, as does Gotham FC. New York City FC, a new team owned by Manchester City F.C. and the New York Yankees, joined MLS in 2015. NYCFC, which plays most home games at Yankee Stadium with a secondary home venue at Citi Field, has plans to build a soccer-specific stadium in Queens and instantly develop an intra-city rivalry with the Red Bulls.

Regardless of where they actually play their home games, most of these teams carry the name of and represent the entire city or state of New York, except for the NBA's Brooklyn Nets, who play in and specifically represent the New York City borough of Brooklyn, and the NHL's New Jersey Devils, who have played their home games in New Jersey since their founding. The New York Red Bulls (MLS founding franchise originally named the "New York/New Jersey MetroStars") – who have also always played in New Jersey – were the only major professional soccer team representing the metropolitan area during their first 19 seasons, and the region's second MLS club, New York City FC, deliberately staked its identity to actually playing in the city, drawing its colors from the city flag and even featuring the flag itself on its uniforms. The area's women's soccer club, Gotham FC, also uses the two sets of initials as the MetroStars once did, although listing New Jersey first (the governor of New Jersey is the club's primary owner).

=== American football ===
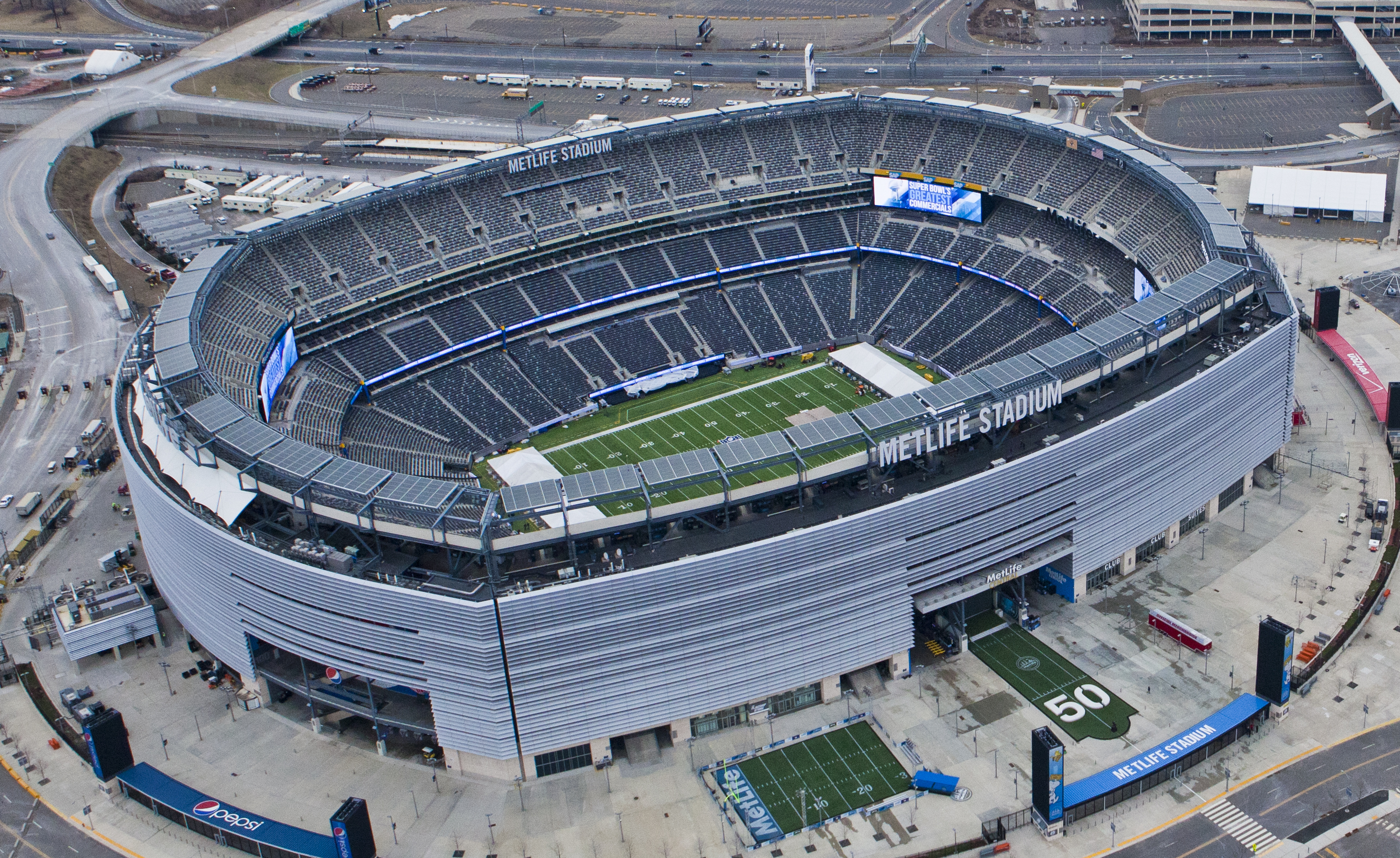
MetLife Stadium, home to both the New York Giants and the New York Jets (NFL)

Since 2010, both the New York Giants and the New York Jets play in MetLife Stadium in nearby East Rutherford, New Jersey, 5 miles from New York City. In 2014, the stadium hosted Super Bowl XLVIII. The Giants and Jets were previously located in New York City; both teams played in the Polo Grounds (Manhattan) and Shea Stadium (Queens), and the Giants played in Yankee Stadium (the Bronx). Neither team plays in the city itself presently, as both teams are located in the Meadowlands Sports Complex in East Rutherford, New Jersey, playing in Giants Stadium for many years before moving to MetLife Stadium. The Giants, a keystone NFL franchise, were founded in 1925, and exist today as one of the oldest presently active organizations in the NFL. Founded in 1960, the originally named New York Titans, later branded as the Jets in 1963, were a charter member of the American Football League (AFL), joining the NFL as part of the AFL/NFL merger in 1970.

New York City also had many historical professional teams. The first professional team in New York was called both the New York Giants and Brooklyn Giants (unrelated to the current New York Giants), and played in the predecessor to the NFL, the American Professional Football Association, in 1921. In 1926, the New York Yankees, Newark Bears (AFL) and Brooklyn Horsemen played in the American Football League, and on the same year, the Brooklyn Lions played in the National Football League before the Horsemen and Lions merged in November and folded at season's end. The Lions' NFL franchise rights were given to the Yankees, who competed in the NFL from 1927 to 1928. When the Yankees folded, its rights were given to the existing barnstorming team Staten Island Stapletons, who played in the NFL until 1932 when it stopped league play and later folded as well.

In 1930, the NFL Brooklyn Dodgers began play at Ebbets Field. The team lasted until 1944, calling themselves the Brooklyn Tigers that last season but going winless. In 1945, the team was merged with the Boston Yanks and played one more home game in Brooklyn that season as the Yanks.

Another team going by the name New York Yankees played in the second AFL in 1936 and 1937. The league also had a Brooklyn Tigers club in 1936, but the team never played in Brooklyn and folded after only seven games. A third incarnation of the Yankees played in the third AFL in 1940 under the Yankees name, and then in 1941 as the New York Americans. Another version of the New York Yankees was a short-lived member of the American Association

In 1946, the new All-America Football Conference had yet another set of Brooklyn Dodgers and New York Yankees teams. These clubs lasted until 1948, after which they merged with each other. The renamed Brooklyn-New York Yankees folded after one season when the AAFC merged with the NFL.

The New York Bulldogs were founded in 1949, sharing the Polo Grounds with the New York Giants, and then being renamed as the New York Yanks and playing in the NFL in the 1950 and 1951 seasons. In 1952, the team was relocated to Texas and renamed as the Dallas Texans.

In 1974, New York briefly hosted a team known as the New York Stars for the short-lived World Football League, but in mid-season the team was relocated to Charlotte and became the Charlotte Hornets.

The short-lived United States Football League had a team in the New York area. The New Jersey Generals played at Giants Stadium in The Meadowlands from 1983 to 1985. At one point, the team was owned by future President Donald Trump. The team folded with the rest of the league.

In 1988, the New York Knights played for one season as part of the Arena Football League, and then ceased operations. In 1997, the AFL added two expansion franchises, the New York CityHawks, who played at Madison Square Garden, and the New Jersey Red Dogs, who played in East Rutherford, New Jersey. The CityHawks moved to Hartford, Connecticut and were renamed the New England Sea Wolves in 1999, and then relocated to Toronto in 2001, and renamed the Toronto Phantoms. The Red Dogs were renamed the New Jersey Gladiators in 2001, then relocated and became the Las Vegas Gladiators in 2003, before relocating again and being renamed the Cleveland Gladiators. When the Sea Wolves, who were owned by the Madison Square Garden Company and had their games televised in New York City on MSG Network, relocated to Toronto, the AFL's Iowa Barnstormers relocated to Long Island and were renamed the New York Dragons. The Dragons played in New York until 2008, when the league suspended operations; no team from New York (either the city or the state) played in the league from its 2010 revival until the Albany Empire, based in the state's capital, joined the AFL in 2018.

The Jets are sometimes regarded as "Long Island's Team" supported by the fact that until 2008, the team trained in Hempstead at Hofstra University, and used to play at Shea Stadium (former home of the New York Mets baseball team) which is close to Nassau County. Statistically, the largest percentage of the Jets fanbase derives from Long Island, hence, the Jets generally receive more media coverage in that part of New York. Fans of both the Giants and Jets traditionally root for both the New York Yankees and the New York Mets as well as both the New York Knicks and the Brooklyn Nets of the NBA and also both the New York Rangers and the New York Islanders of the NHL.

Two attempts by Vince McMahon at creating a competing football league, both named the XFL, have been attempted in the New York metropolitan area. The first XFL league was created as a joint venture between World Wrestling Entertainment and NBC in 2001, had the New York/New Jersey Hitmen playing at Giants Stadium for the only season they played before the league folded. The New York/New Jersey Hitmen finished in third for the XFL Eastern Division for the season they played. In 2020, the New York Guardians of the newly revived XFL began playing at MetLife Stadium. After the XFL filed for Chapter 11 bankruptcy on April 13, 2020, citing the premature suspension of their season due to the COVID-19 pandemic, the Guardians moved to Orlando, Florida and the league no longer has a New York team.

Along with New York's two NFL teams, the New York metropolitan area is home to the New York Sharks women's football team. The New York Sharks are NYC's premier professional women's tackle football team. Established in 1999 the Sharks are the longest-running and most decorated team in women's tackle football having won 3 conference titles (2002, 2003, 2004 IWFL East), 6 division titles (2002, 2003, 2004, 2005, 2006, 2007 IWFL) and two championship titles (2002 IWFL, 2018 WFA). The Sharks play at many fields and have no official home stadium. The season for women's football is from April to June with playoffs and the championship game occurring from June to July. As of 2011 the Sharks are now with the WFA (Women's Football Alliance ) along with the Bay Area Bandits, Boston Militia, Chicago Force, Dallas Diamonds, DC Divas, Kansas City Tribe, Pittsburgh Passion, and the San Diego Surge in an effort to bring together the best franchises of women's football.

The NFL's headquarters are located in New York City, at 345 Park Avenue in Manhattan.

=== Baseball ===
In New York, baseball is still regarded as the most popular sport, despite being overtaken by football in terms of perceived popularity (but not attendance) throughout the country, as based on TV ratings and consistent fan following for the entire season. New York is home to two Major League Baseball franchises. The New York Yankees of the American League have played in New York since 1903. Known for iconic ballplayers such as Babe Ruth, Lou Gehrig, Joe DiMaggio, Mickey Mantle, Yogi Berra and countless others, they play in Yankee Stadium in the Bronx and have won the World Series 27 times, the most victories by any team in the four major North American professional sports leagues. The New York Mets have represented New York in the National League since 1962. The Mets play in Citi Field in Flushing, Queens and have won five NL pennants and two World Series, thus making them one of the most decorated expansion teams in Major League Baseball. The "Subway Series" is the name used for all regular season and World Series meetings between the two teams. Before interleague play was introduced in 1997, the only instance these two teams could have played each other would have been in the World Series. The Mets and Yankees played for the World Series in 2000, with the Yankees winning the series 4–1.

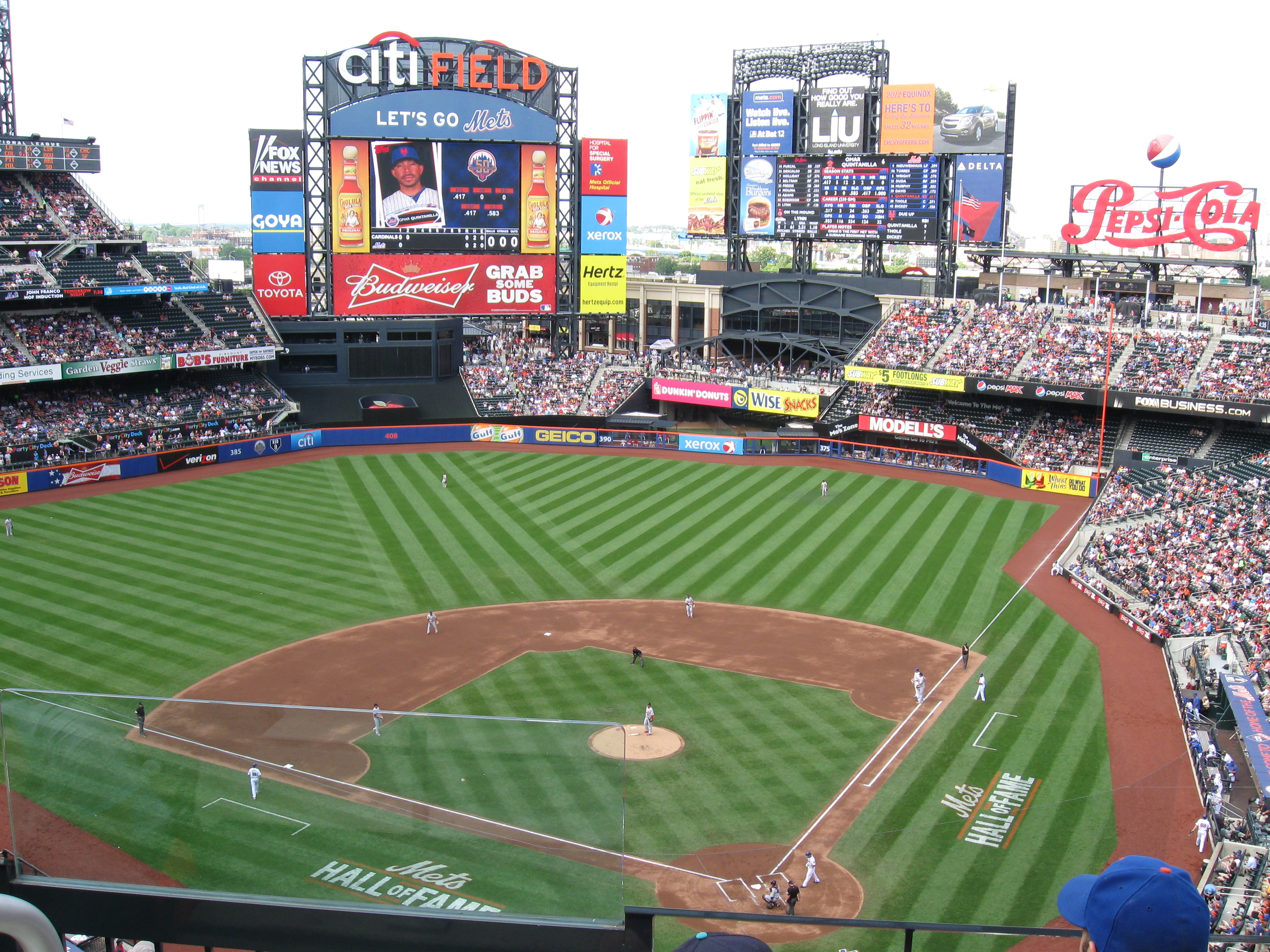
Citi Field, home of the New York Mets in Queens

For many New York baseball fans, the rivalry between the Yankees and the Boston Red Sox, is arguably the most historic in North American professional sports. When the Mets beat the Red Sox in the 1986 World Series, many Yankee fans attended the parade celebrating the Mets' win, saying that "anyone who beats Boston is worth coming down for."

There have been 14 Subway Series World Series match-ups between the Yankees and their National League rivals; the Mets (once), and with the two teams that departed for California in the 1950s—the Brooklyn Dodgers (7 times) and New York Giants (6 times).

New York City is also home to one Minor League Baseball team, the Brooklyn Cyclones. They are the Mets High-A affiliate, playing in the South Atlantic League. Two independent baseball league teams also play in the New York metropolitan area, with a third planned. The Long Island Ducks of the independent Atlantic League have played in Bethpage Ballpark in Central Islip since 2000, and were joined by a club playing in the city limits when the Staten Island FerryHawks began play at SIUH Community Park in 2022. In 2011, the New York Boulders, now of the independent Frontier League, began play at Clover Stadium in Pomona.

New York has historically had many short-lived baseball clubs including the New York Mutuals, Brooklyn Atlantics, Brooklyn Enterprise, Excelsior of Brooklyn and Brooklyn Eckfords of the National Association of Baseball Players; the New York Knickerbockers, one of the first baseball teams; the New York Metropolitans and Brooklyn Gladiators of the American Association (19th century); the New York Giants (PL) and Brooklyn Ward's Wonders of the Players' League; the Brooklyn Tip-Tops of the Federal League; the Brooklyn Bushwicks, Springfield Greys, Barton's Nighthawks, Glendale Farmers, Mount Vernon Scarlets, Union City Reds, Carlton's of the Bronx, and Bay Parkway, Bay Ridge, Cedarhurst, West New York, and Queens Club of The Metropolitan Baseball Association; and the New York Highlanders and Brooklyn Bridegrooms, precursors to the Yankees and Dodgers. There were also two Newark Bears teams Newark Bears and Newark Bears (International League). Negro league baseball teams also were present in New York, including the Brooklyn Royal Giants, Newark Stars, Lincoln Giants, Newark Browns, New York Black Yankees, New York Cubans, and the Newark Eagles.

In 1858 in Corona, Queens, at the Fashion Race Course, the first games of baseball to charge admission took place. The games, which took place between the all-stars of Brooklyn, including players from the Brooklyn Atlantics, Excelsior of Brooklyn, Putnams and Eckford of Brooklyn, and the All Stars of New York (Manhattan), including players from the New York Knickerbockers, Gothams (predecessors of the New York Giants), Eagles and Empire, are commonly believed to the first all-star baseball games.

Two historical clubs, the Brooklyn Dodgers and New York Giants, were among the most storied clubs in professional baseball, and were home to such players as Jackie Robinson and Willie Mays. The two teams left for California—the Dodgers for Los Angeles and the Giants for San Francisco—in 1957. The city currently has two Major League Baseball teams, the Mets (who were formed in 1962 to replace the Dodgers and the Giants), and the Yankees.

The city is also home to New York Heights of the Women's Professional Baseball League.

Major League Baseball's headquarters are located in New York City, at 245 Park Avenue in Manhattan.

=== Basketball ===
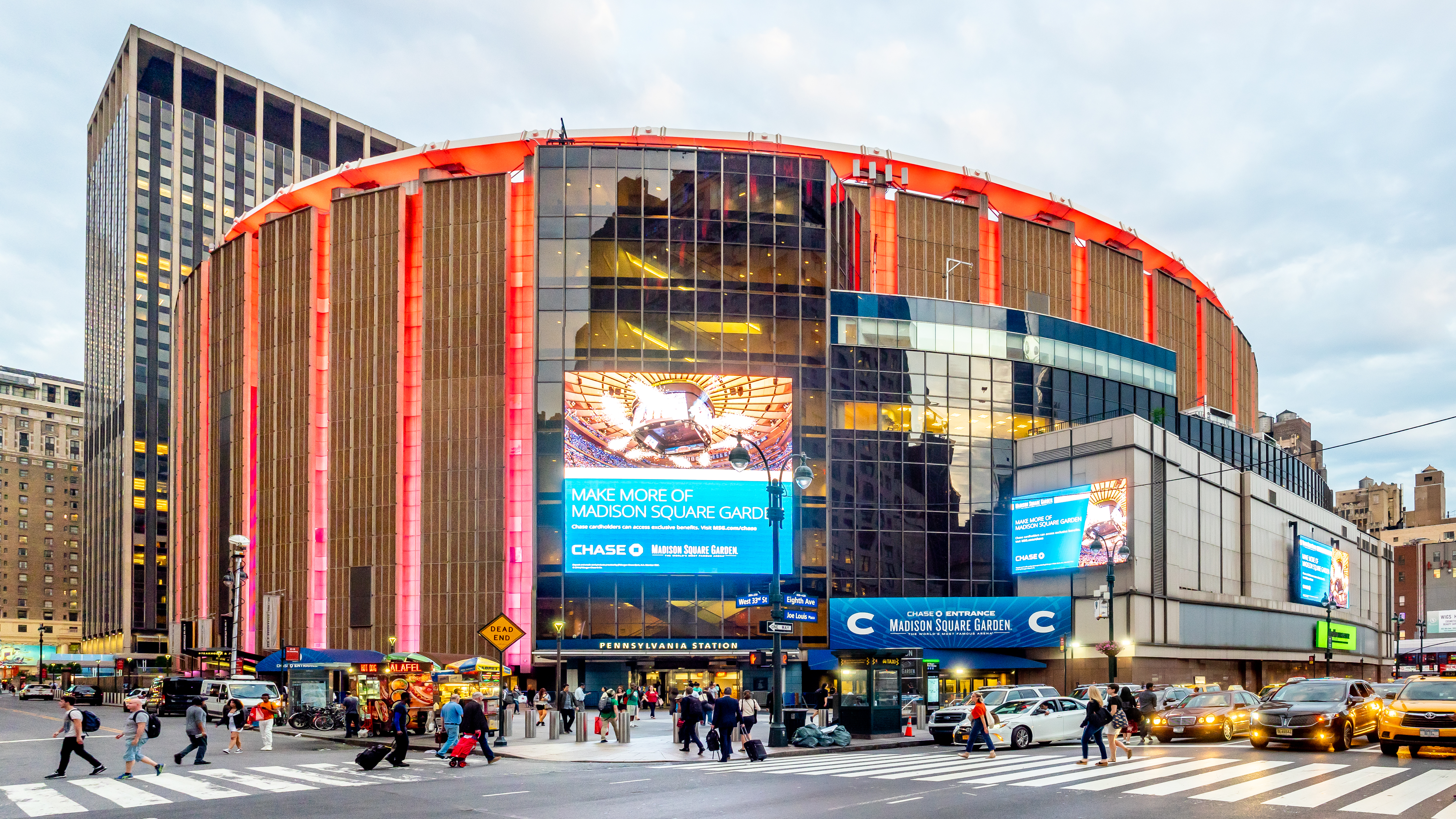
Madison Square Garden, home of the New York Knicks (NBA) and New York Rangers (NHL) in Manhattan

The first national basketball championship for major colleges, the National Invitation Tournament, was held in New York in 1938, and its semifinal and final rounds remain at Madison Square Garden. The NIT has spawned a major early-season tournament known as the NIT Season Tip-Off; the semifinal and final rounds of that event are also held at the Garden.

At Madison Square Garden, New Yorkers can watch the New York Knicks play NBA basketball. Through the 2017 WNBA season, the New York Liberty also played at the Garden, but that team's main home has changed twice since then. First, the team moved to Westchester County Center in White Plains in 2018. Then, after the team's 2019 purchase by the owner of the NBA's Brooklyn Nets, the Liberty have moved to the Nets' home of Barclays Center in Brooklyn in 2020.

The Nets began playing in Brooklyn in 2012, the first major professional sports team to play in the historic borough in half a century. Before the merger of the defunct American Basketball Association with the NBA during the 1976–77 season, the New York Nets, who shared the same home arena (Nassau Veterans Memorial Coliseum) on Long Island with the NHL's New York Islanders, were a two-time champion in the ABA and starred the famous Hall of Fame forward Julius Erving. During the first season of the merger (1976–77), the Nets continued to play on Long Island, although Erving's contract had by then been sold to the Philadelphia 76ers. The Nets transferred to New Jersey then next season and became known as the New Jersey Nets, and later moved to Brooklyn prior to the 2012–13 NBA season.

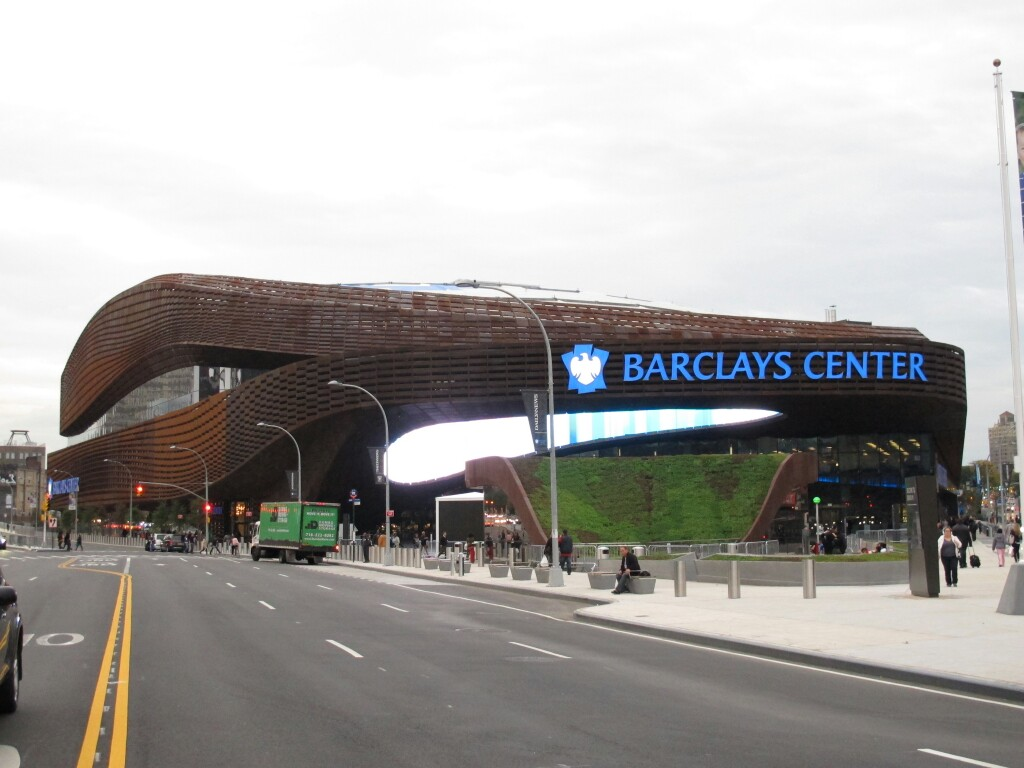
Barclays Center, home of the Brooklyn Nets (NBA) and New York Liberty (WNBA) in Brooklyn

The Long Island Nets, an NBA G League team, started playing at the Barclays Center in 2016 before moving to Nassau Coliseum in 2017. The Westchester Knicks started in 2014 at the Westchester County Center.

Rucker Park in Harlem is a celebrated court where many NBA athletes play in the summer league.

The NBA's headquarters are located in New York City, at Fifth Avenue's Olympic Tower.

The New York Liberty are one of the original teams of the WNBA, which was formed in 1997. The team's main venue moved from Madison Square Garden to Westchester County Center after the 2017 season, and then to Barclays Center after the 2019 season. During a massive renovation project at the Garden between 2011 and 2013, the Liberty temporarily played their home games at the Prudential Center in Newark, New Jersey. The team were the last remaining original franchise in the WNBA to win a championship, which they finally won in 2024.

From 1933 to 1935, Newark had a team in the American Basketball League. It its first season it was known as the Newark Bears, and in its second and final season the Newark Mules.

There was briefly a Long Island Ducks basketball team at the Long Island Arena in 1977–1978.

Long Island PrimeTime played at Louis Armstrong Gymnasium in Flushing from 2006 to 2007. They were part of the United States Basketball League.

=== Ice hockey ===
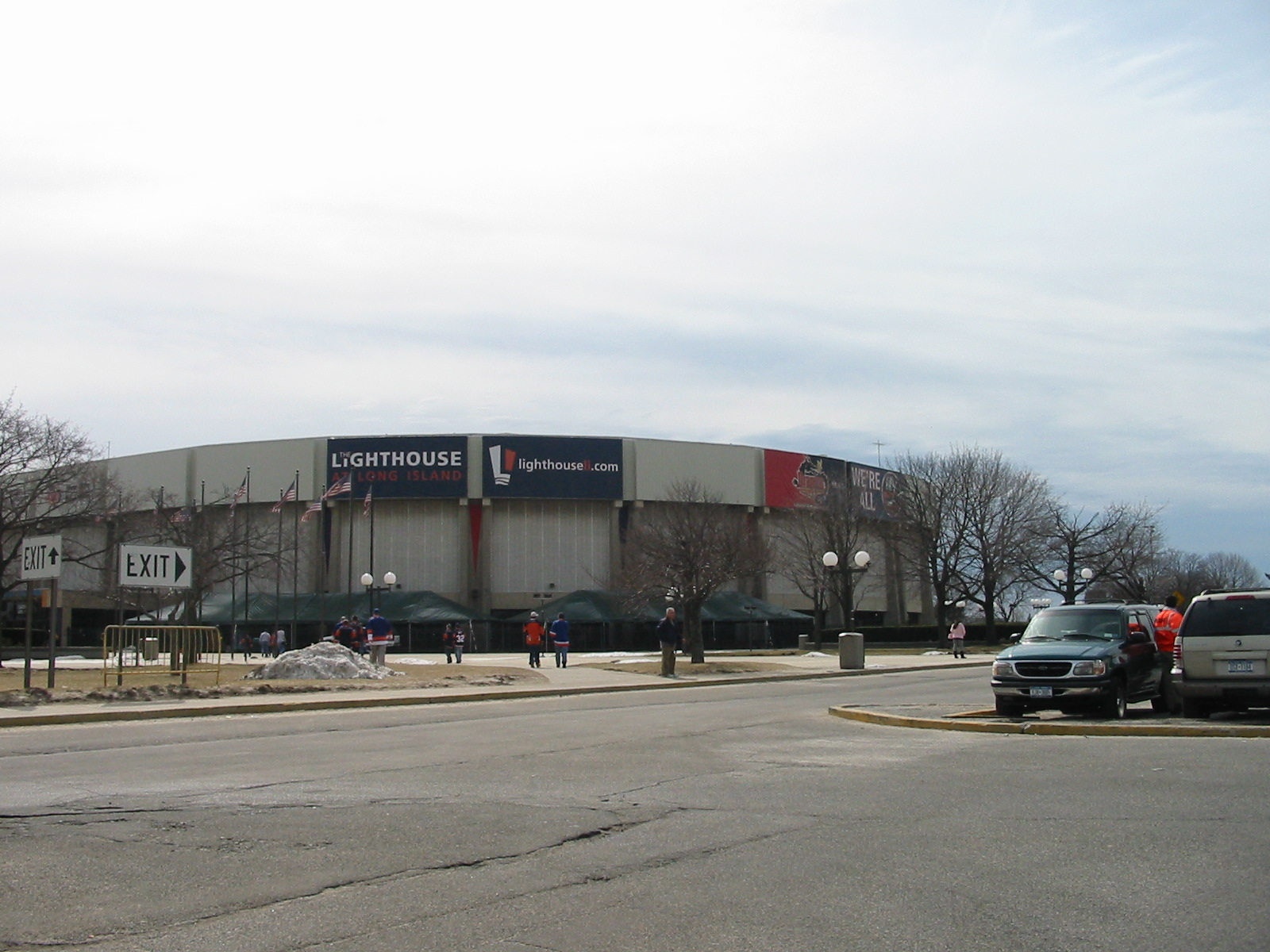
The Nassau Coliseum in Uniondale, was home to the New York Islanders from 1972 to 2015 (and temporarily from 2018 to 2021), and the New York Nets from 1972 to 1976.

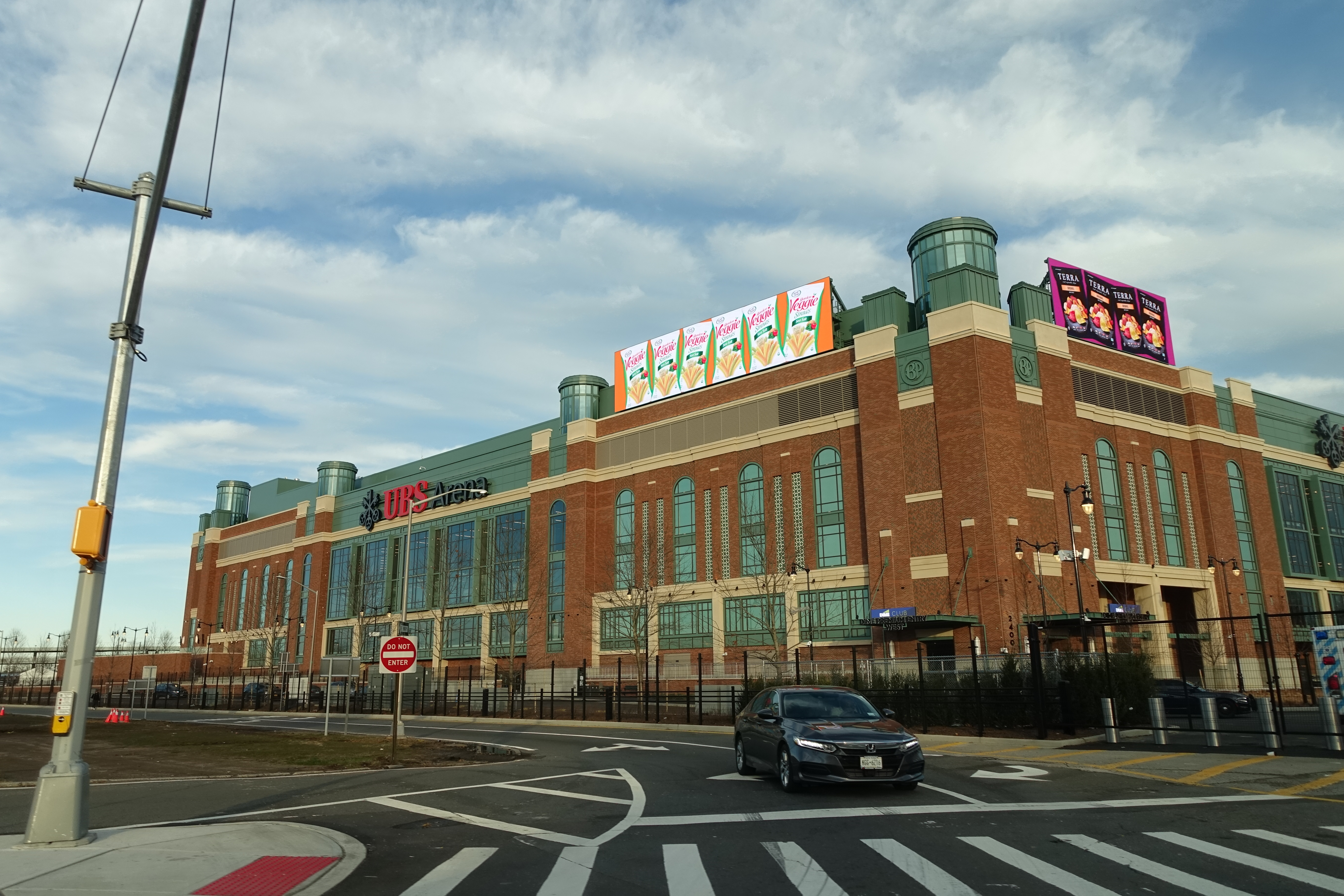
UBS Arena in Elmont has served as the home of the New York Islanders since 2021.

Ice hockey has a storied history and large following in the New York metropolitan area, which is unique in being the only metropolitan area and media market in the United States and Canada to feature three major league professional teams participating in the same sport. New York City is represented by the New York Rangers, playing at Madison Square Garden in Manhattan. The New York Islanders play at UBS Arena in the Nassau County community of Elmont. The New Jersey Devils play at Prudential Center in Newark, New Jersey. The metropolitan area's three NHL franchises have won the Stanley Cup a combined eleven times, and they are historically division rivals with high levels of intensity and animosity among and between their respective fans, having played in the same division every season since the Devils relocated to the New Jersey Meadowlands from Denver in 1982. Currently, they play in the Metropolitan Division.

The Rangers, established in 1926, are one of the Original Six — a term given to the six NHL teams in existence before the league doubled its size in 1967. The primary fan base for the Rangers is in the city's five boroughs, Westchester County, lower Hudson Valley New York, western Connecticut, and Northern New Jersey. However, they maintain a sizable following within parts of the market claimed by their two local rivals.

The Islanders, established in 1972, opened the new UBS Arena, adjacent to Belmont Park and immediately across the Cross Island Parkway from Queens, for the 2021–22 season. The Islanders provide their fans with an intense rivalry with the Rangers, most of whom are based in Nassau and Suffolk Counties on Long Island. The chosen location of their new home also includes a new full-time Long Island Rail Road station at Elmont, providing direct access from Penn Station and other points both in New York City and out east on Long Island. This has the effect of connecting all three area NHL franchises with a single transfer at Manhattan's Penn Station (located beneath Madison Square Garden) necessary to reach Newark Penn Station (two blocks from the Devils' Prudential Center) from Elmont.

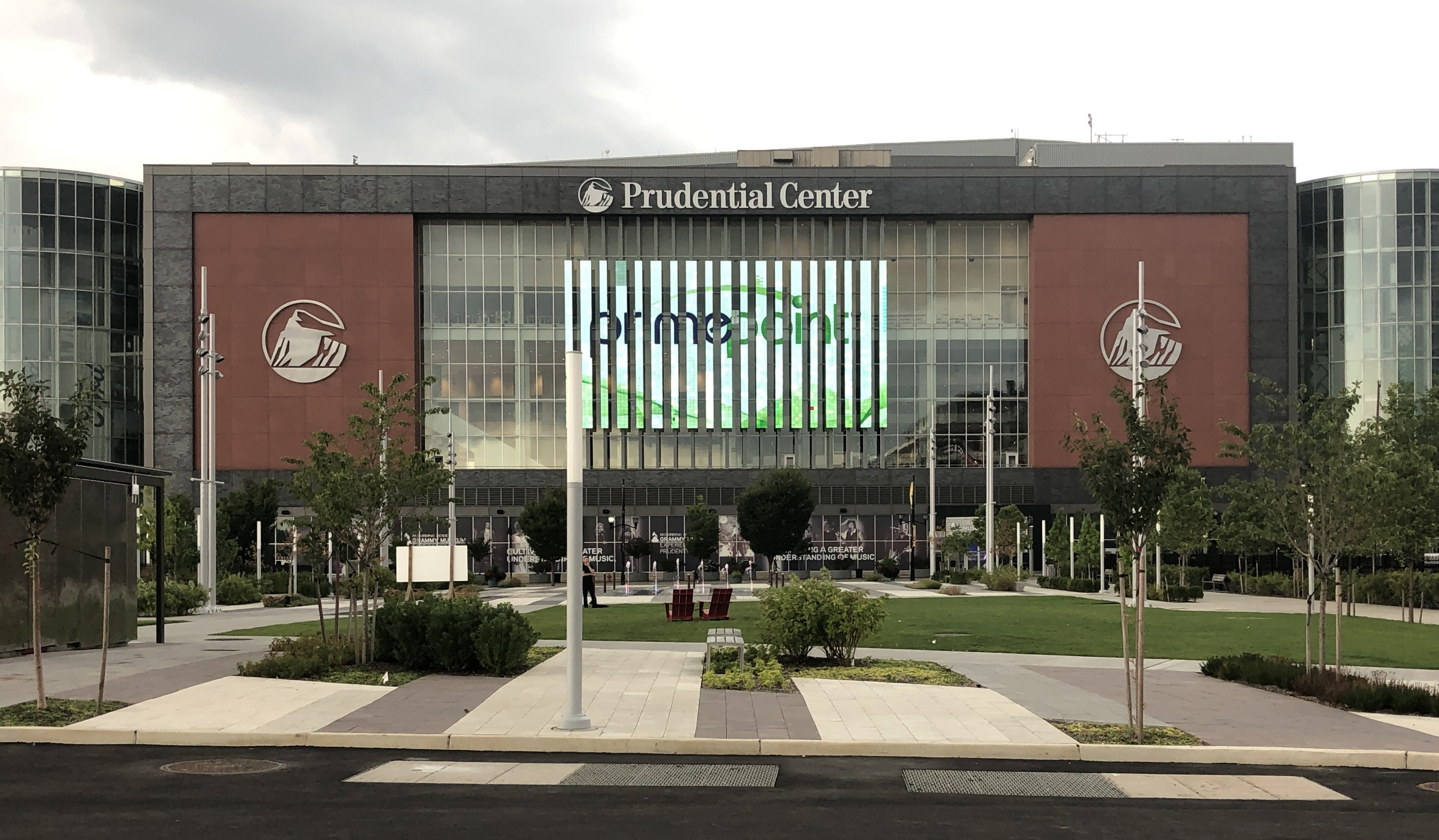
Prudential Center in Newark has served as the home of the New Jersey Devils since 2007 and was the home of the New Jersey Nets from 2010 to 2012.

The Devils, who moved from Denver, Colorado to New Jersey in 1982, provide area hockey fans with yet another intense rivalry involving the Rangers largely stemming from geographic proximity, a manifestation of a long-standing rivalry between the states of New York and New Jersey. Both teams have achieved famous results for their respective fan bases in playoff meetings, including the 1994 Eastern Conference Finals, ending in a dramatic double-overtime goal by the Rangers' Stéphane Matteau during the 7th and deciding game. The Devils took a 3–2 series lead into game six in New Jersey and jumped out to a 2–0 lead in the game. However, Mark Messier's famous guarantee and hat-trick led the Rangers to victory and a seventh game. As time wound down in game seven, the Rangers were clinging to a 1–0 lead when New Jersey's Valeri Zelepukin tied the game with 7.7 seconds left in regulation to silence the Garden crowd and send the game into overtime, where Matteau won it for the Rangers. In the 2012 Eastern Conference Finals, the Rangers would be in a very similar scenario, but would ultimately fail to overcome the 3–2 series deficit after trailing 2-0 and forcing overtime in game six across the Hudson River at Prudential Center in Newark on a series-winning goal only 1:03 into overtime by Adam Henrique. As of their most recent meeting in 2023's First Round in which the Devils rallied to win in seven games after recovering from a 0–2 series deficit, the Devils and Rangers have met seven times in the playoffs, with the first three series won by the Rangers, and three of the last four series won by the Devils. The Devils' primary fan base resides throughout Northern and Central New Jersey, specifically areas of the state coterminous with the New York media and sports market where the MSG networks (which serve as the television home for all three area hockey teams) are available.

The Islanders and Rangers had a bitter rivalry in the 1970s and the 1980s, as the Islanders won four consecutive Stanley Cup titles; the Rangers won their most recent NHL championship in the 1994 Stanley Cup Final, the fourth Cup victory in that team's history. The two teams have met eight times in the playoffs, with the Islanders winning five of those matchups. Incidentally, as the Islanders and Devils have had little success simultaneously (the Devils’ Stanley Cup success occurred in the mid-late 1990s and early 2000s) throughout their respective histories and have faced off in the playoffs only once in the 1987-88 season in a series won by the Devils, this rivalry is perceived as an afterthought in the area particularly when compared to the Rangers’ rivalries with the Islanders and Devils.

The Metropolitan Riveters, established in 2015, were one of the four charter members of the National Women's Hockey League (NWHL). They played home games in the Barnabas Health Hockey House at the Prudential Center in Newark beginning with the 2016–17 NWHL season. In 2017, the Riveters announced they were partnering with the New Jersey Devils, becoming the first NWHL team to officially partner with an NHL team. In 2018, the Riveters won the Isobel Cup title. The NWHL, which rebranded as the Premier Hockey Federation in 2021, was purchased and dissolved in 2023 as part of an effort to create a new, unified North American women's professional league. This meant that the Riveters folded; however, New York was granted one of six charter franchises in the new Professional Women's Hockey League. New York Sirens debuted on January 1, 2024, winning the league's inaugural game.

New York City also had a historical NHL team, the New York Americans (also known as the Amerks, and in 1941–42, the Brooklyn Americans), who played between 1925 and 1942. Predating the Rangers by one season, they were the first hockey team to play in the city, and for most of the life of the franchise shared Madison Square Garden with the Rangers. The franchise was never a big winner, and disbanded during World War II due to financial problems and a depleted roster. The World Hockey Association team called the New York Raiders and later the New York Golden Blades played at Madison Square Garden and Cherry Hill, New Jersey from 1972 until 1974 when they moved to San Diego. A few historical minor league hockey teams played in the New York area in the Eastern Hockey League. The New York Rovers started as a farm team of the Rangers in 1935 playing at Madison Square Garden. They moved to the Long Island Arena in 1959 and became the Long Island Ducks (ice hockey) until 1973. The New York Bobcats are a USA Hockey-Sanctioned Tier III Junior Ice Hockey Team at Twin Rinks in Eisenhower Park from 2000 to the present. The New York Apple Core are a Tier III Junior A Ice Hockey Team in Brewster, New York.

The NHL's headquarters are also located in New York City, at One Manhattan West.

=== Soccer ===
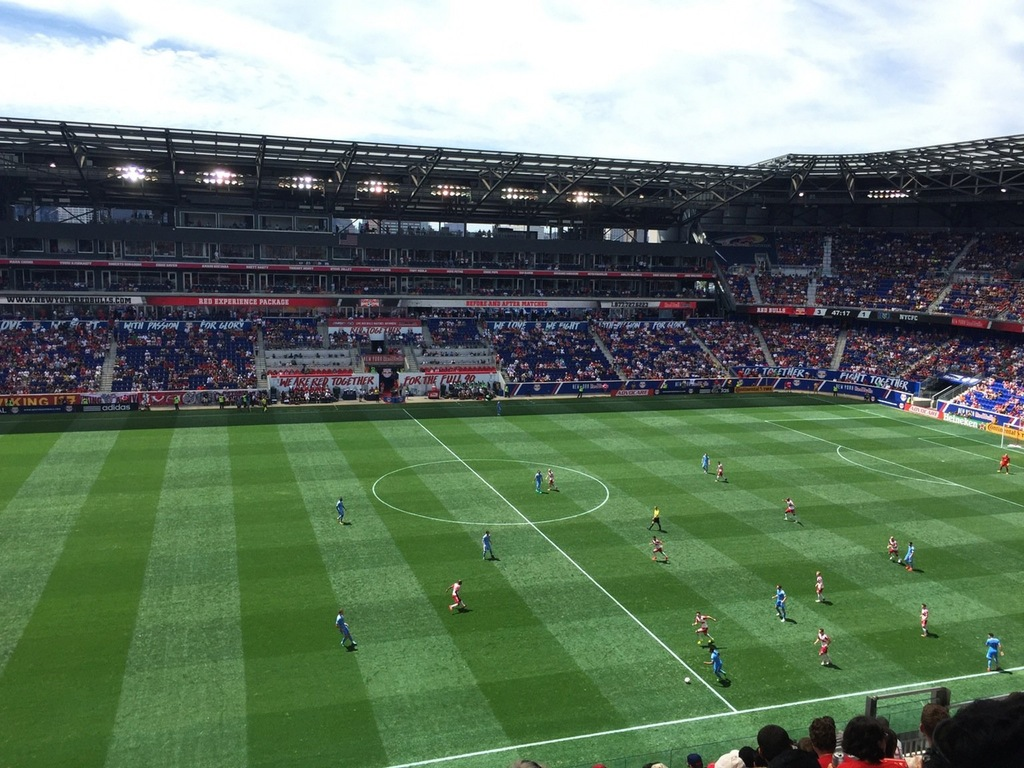
Hudson River Derby match between the New York Red Bulls and New York City FC

Professional soccer, as in the rest of the country, is rapidly growing in popularity in New York. The New York Red Bulls of Major League Soccer (originally known as the "MetroStars" until the team's purchase by Austrian corporation Red Bull GmbH in 2006) have played in the metropolitan area since the league's founding in 1996. Since 2010 they have played at Sports Illustrated Stadium, a soccer-specific stadium in Harrison, New Jersey, with a capacity of just over 25,000. The Red Bulls have won the Supporters' Shield, awarded to the team with the best regular season record, on three occasions, most recently in 2018.

On May 21, 2013, MLS announced that New York City FC would be the league's 20th team, jointly owned by the English club Manchester City F.C. and the New York Yankees. They began playing in MLS in 2015 at Yankee Stadium in the Bronx, and became the first New York City-area team to win the MLS Cup in 2021. After a ten-year campaign to build a stadium within the five boroughs of New York City, the club announced in November 2022 that they had a deal to build Etihad Park, a privately funded 25,000-seat stadium in the Willets Point neighborhood of Queens. The new stadium, the first soccer-specific stadium in New York City, will be the centerpiece of a 23-acre redevelopment project in the former industrial area, including a 250-room hotel, 2,500 affordable housing units, retail space and a public elementary school.

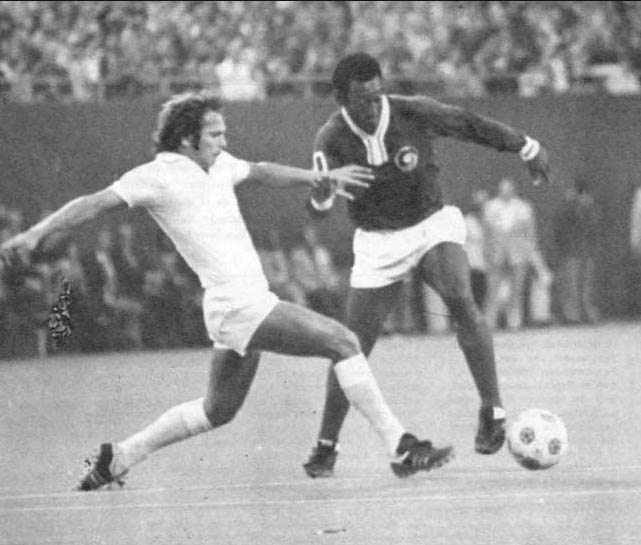
Pelé played for the New York Cosmos from 1975 to 1977.

The New York City area was once home to the New York Cosmos (1970–1984), which was arguably the most popular American soccer team ever. Playing in the FIFA-backed, major professional North American Soccer League (NASL), the Cosmos were known for fielding some of the world's greatest players including Pelé, Franz Beckenbauer, Carlos Alberto Torres, Johan Neeskens, and Giorgio Chinaglia. The acquisition of these foreign players, particularly Pelé, made the Cosmos into what Gavin Newsham called "the most glamorous team in world football", and contributed to the development of soccer across the United States. The club won the Soccer Bowl five times: 1972, 1977, 1978, 1980, and 1982. Soccer Bowl '78, which was held at Giants Stadium, saw a record crowd of 74,091 – the highest attendance to date for any club soccer championship in the United States. Cosmos road trips, described by traveling secretary Steve Marshall as "like traveling with the Rolling Stones", saw the team pack out each stadium it visited, while at home, the team attracted numerous high-profile celebrity supporters. While soccer had previously been largely ignored by the American press, the Cosmos and other NASL teams now became regular fixtures on the back pages. The NASL collapsed abruptly in late 1984, and was not replaced by a new professional soccer league until Major League Soccer's first season in 1996. A feature-length documentary about the New York club, called Once in a Lifetime: The Extraordinary Story of the New York Cosmos, was released in theaters in 2006. The film, narrated by Matt Dillon, featured interviews with many of the players and personalities involved with the team.

A second Cosmos club was founded in 2010, beginning play in a new second-division North American Soccer League in 2013. The team most recently played at Mitchel Athletic Complex in suburban Uniondale, New York, in the third-division National Independent Soccer Association before going on hiatus in January 2021.

Based in Brooklyn, Brooklyn FC, fields a women's team in the first-division USL Super League in 2024 and has a men's team in the second-division USL Championship since 2026.

Gotham FC, known before 2021 as Sky Blue FC and NY/NJ Gotham before 2025, is one of the eight charter teams and nine current members of the National Women's Soccer League (NWSL), the third women's professional league in the US. Since 2020, Gotham FC has shared Sports Illustrated Stadium with the New York Red Bulls. In 2028 Gotham FC will relocated to Etihad Park in Queens. The organization had previously been charter members of NWSL's effective predecessor, Women's Professional Soccer. The league started play in 2009; Sky Blue became the league's inaugural champion despite finishing fourth in the league during the regular season, which meant that they had to play on the road in all three WPS playoff games. The defunct New York Power was the region's first professional women's soccer team, playing in the Women's United Soccer Association from 2000 to 2003.

The men's semi-pro teams Manhattan SC and F.A. Euro play in the fourth tier of U.S. Soccer in USL League Two.

Major League Soccer's headquarters are located in New York City, at 420 Fifth Avenue.

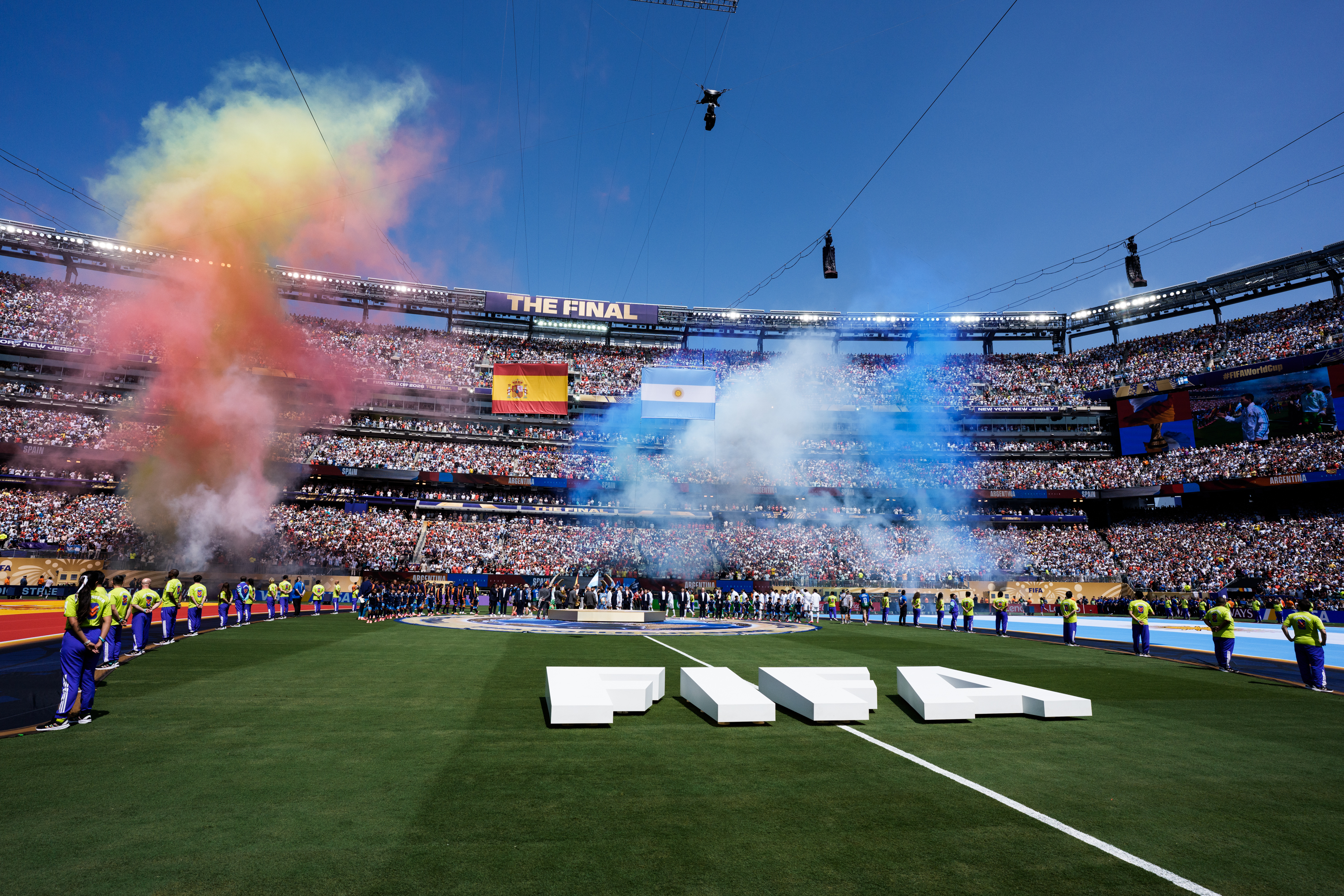
MetLife Stadium prior to the 2026 FIFA World Cup final between Spain and Argentina.

New York City was one of the host cities of the 1994 FIFA World Cup and was later one of eleven U.S. host cities for the 2026 FIFA World Cup, with the final taking place at MetLife Stadium. The city also hosted the Copa América Centenario final in 2016 and the 2025 FIFA Club World Cup final.

New York City is one of six cities outside of Los Angeles which will host Olympic soccer matches during the 2028 Summer Olympics, with Etihad Park set to host nine matches including a men’s quarter-final.

=== Cricket ===
In Major League Cricket, New York City is represented by MI New York. In 2023, Major League Cricket gave one of 6 Twenty20 Cricket teams to New York City when MI New York was established to kick off the league's inaugural season. They became the 2023 MLC Champions and became the first ever champions in MLC's history by defeating the Seattle Orcas in the 2023 Major League Cricket final in 7 wickets.

The Staten Island Cricket Club, established in 1872, is the oldest continuously operating cricket club in the United States. The New York Metropolitan Cricket League (MCL), established in 1890, is one of the oldest cricket leagues in the country. The MCL conducts matches in Staten Island, Brooklyn, and Nassau County.

=== Major league professional championships ===
==== New York Yankees (MLB) ====
27 World Series titles

- 1923
- 1927
- 1928
- 1932
- 1936
- 1937
- 1938
- 1939
- 1941
- 1943
- 1947
- 1949
- 1950
- 1951
- 1952
- 1953
- 1956
- 1958
- 1961
- 1962
- 1977
- 1978
- 1996
- 1998
- 1999
- 2000
- 2009

==== New York Mets (MLB) ====
2 World Series titles

- 1969
- 1986

==== New York Giants (MLB) ====
5 World Series titles

- 1905
- 1921
- 1922
- 1933
- 1954

==== Brooklyn Dodgers (MLB) ====
1 World Series title

- 1955

==== New York Cubans (NNL) ====
1 Negro World Series title

- 1947

==== New York Cosmos (NASL) ====
5 Soccer Bowl titles

- 1972
- 1977
- 1978
- 1980
- 1982

==== New York City FC (MLS) ====
1 MLS Cup title

- 2021

==== Gotham FC (NWSL) ====
3 Women's Professional Soccer titles

- 2009
- 2023
- 2025

==== New York Giants (NFL) ====
4 NFL championships (pre–Super Bowl)

- 1927
- 1934
- 1938
- 1956

4 Super Bowl titles

- 1986 (XXI)
- 1990 (XXV)
- 2007 (XLII)
- 2011 (XLVI)

==== New York Jets (NFL) ====
1 Super Bowl title

- 1968 (III)

==== New York Knicks (NBA) ====
3 NBA Finals titles

- 1970
- 1973
- 2026

==== New York / Brooklyn Nets (NBA) ====
2 ABA Finals titles

- 1974
- 1976

==== New York Liberty (WNBA) ====
1 WNBA Finals title

- 2024

==== New Jersey Devils (NHL) ====
3 Stanley Cup titles

- 1995
- 2000
- 2003

==== New York Rangers (NHL) ====
4 Stanley Cup titles

- 1928
- 1933
- 1940
- 1994

==== New York Islanders (NHL) ====
4 Stanley Cup titles

- 1980
- 1981
- 1982
- 1983

=== Defunct arenas and stadiums ===
Location of former major league sports venues in the New York metropolitan area
1 Ebbets Field
2 Giants Stadium
3 Madison Square Garden
4 Meadowlands Arena
5 Nassau Coliseum
6 Polo Grounds
7 Shea Stadium
8 Yankee Stadium

Throughout the 20th century, the city had several historic sports venues: the original Yankee Stadium, home of the New York Yankees from 1923 to 2008, before the team moved into their new stadium in 2009; Ebbets Field, home of the Brooklyn Dodgers from 1913 until 1957, which was torn down in 1960; and the Polo Grounds in northern Harlem, which was the home of the New York Giants of Major League Baseball from 1911 to 1957 (and the first home of the New York Mets) before being demolished in 1964. The Mets, who previously played at Shea Stadium, moved into the newly constructed Citi Field in 2009. Also the current Madison Square Garden, atop Pennsylvania Station in Midtown Manhattan, is actually the fourth separate building to use that name; the first two were near Madison Square, hence the name, and the third was at 50th Street and Eighth Avenue.

The 2000s saw almost a complete revamping of the area's major sporting venues. This began in 2007, when the Devils moved to Newark, New Jersey, and opened the Prudential Center. In 2009, both the Mets and Yankees opened new baseball stadiums adjacent to their old homes, with the Mets replacing Shea Stadium with Citi Field and the Yankees building a new Yankee Stadium. In 2010, the Jets and Giants moved to a new shared facility called New Meadowlands Stadium (now MetLife Stadium) and the Red Bulls opened their own soccer-specific stadium in Harrison, New Jersey, Red Bull Arena (the three had previously shared Giants Stadium in East Rutherford, New Jersey). In 2012, the Nets moved from New Jersey to the Barclays Center in Brooklyn and became the Brooklyn Nets. The Islanders left Nassau County, and followed the Nets into Brooklyn in 2015 before returning to a new location in Nassau County in 2021.

Other sports-related renovations and construction work is as follows:

- Madison Square Garden, the home of the Knicks and Rangers, underwent a massive renovation from 2010 to 2013 which finished in time for the 2013–14 NHL and NBA seasons. The $850 million transformation included a rebuilding of the seating bowl and concourses, new luxury suites, new LED scoreboard and ribbon boards, and two new spectator bridges that span 65 feet (20 m) above the arena on each side of the playing surface.
- On August 15, 2013, the Nassau County government announced that Forest City Ratner had won the bid for the renovation of the Nassau Coliseum, which was vacated by the Islanders in 2015, pending approval from the Nassau legislature and the Hempstead town government. Ratner's proposal called for a reduction of the Coliseum's seating capacity to 13,000 and an aesthetic revamp of the arena's interior and concrete facade designed by SHoP Architects, the firm which designed the Barclays Center, which would cost the group approximately $89 million. As part of his bid, the Islanders would play 6 games per season in the arena, the Brooklyn Nets would play one exhibition game, and a minor league hockey team would call the arena home.
- Previously Major League Soccer was spearheading the search for a new soccer-specific stadium within city limits for use by the 20th MLS expansion team. After narrowing the locations down to six, amongst them being Pier 40 in Manhattan, Greenpoint in Brooklyn and the area near Citi Field in Queens, the league zeroed in on the dilapidated Fountain of Industry site in Flushing Meadows Corona Park, Queens in June 2012. The site was also previously discussed as a possible location for the New York Jets to build a stadium after their West Side Stadium project fell through, but the Jets opted to remain in New Jersey instead. However, the Flushing site faced opposition from local communities regarding the usage of park space, as well as the New York Mets, who play nearby, and the project was discarded. The New York City FC expansion team took over the stadium search after its founding, and after looking at locations in the Bronx the club eventually secured Willets Point, Queens, just north of Flushing Meadows Corona Park, for its stadium site. The new stadium is expected to open in 2027.
- The Islanders eventually returned to Nassau County in 2021 with the opening of UBS Arena adjacent to the Belmont Park horse racing track in Elmont.

== Minor league sports ==
=== Current minor league teams ===
The following New York metropolitan area sports teams play in a lower level professional sports leagues in the United States:

Club	League	Venue	Location	Founded	Titles
Brooklyn Cyclones	South Atlantic League Baseball	Maimonides Park	Brooklyn, New York	2001	2
Long Island Ducks	Atlantic League Baseball	Bethpage Ballpark	Central Islip, New York	2000	4
Staten Island FerryHawks	Atlantic League Baseball	SIUH Community Park	Staten Island, New York	2021	0
Somerset Patriots	Eastern League Baseball	TD Bank Ballpark	Bridgewater Township, New Jersey	1998	7
New Jersey Jackals	Frontier League Baseball	Hinchliffe Stadium	Paterson, New Jersey	1998	6
New York Boulders	Frontier League Baseball	Clover Stadium	Pomona, New York	2011	1
Sussex County Miners	Frontier League Baseball	Skylands Stadium	Augusta, New Jersey	2015	1
Jersey Shore BlueClaws	South Atlantic League Baseball	ShoreTown Ballpark	Lakewood, New Jersey	2001	3
Long Island Nets	NBA G League Basketball	Nassau Coliseum	Uniondale, New York	2016	0
Westchester Knicks	NBA G League Basketball	Westchester County Center	White Plains, New York	2014	0
Empire State Titans	Minor League Cricket	Idlewild Park	Queens, New York	2020	0
Manhattan Yorkers	Minor League Cricket	Mercer County Park	West Windsor, New Jersey	2020	0
Brooklyn FC (men)	USL Championship	Maimonides Park	Brooklyn, New York	2023	0
New York Cosmos	USL League One	Hinchliffe Stadium	Paterson, New Jersey	2025	0
New York Red Bulls II	MLS Next Pro Soccer	MSU Soccer Park at Pittser Field	Montclair, New Jersey	2015	1
New York City FC II	MLS Next Pro Soccer	Belson Stadium	Queens, New York	2021	0
New York City THC	USA Team Handball Nationals Handball	River East Elementary School	East Harlem, New York	1973	7
New York Athletic Club	USA Team Handball Nationals Handball	NYCA City House	Manhattan, New York	1973	4

== Other sports ==
=== Boxing ===
The sport of boxing came to the United States from England in the late 1700s and took root in the 1800s mainly in large urban areas such as Boston, New York City, and New Orleans. Initially boxing was viewed as illegal and many fights and fighters operated in secrecy to avoid arrest. The New York state legislature passed “An act to prevent Prize Fighting” in 1859. With the law, the act of boxing was not illegal in itself, but fighting for prize money was against public decency.

Most boxing matches of the early 1800s were conducted under the London Prize Ring Rules, which were based on a set of rules documented by English boxer Jack Broughton in 1743. A change in the rules occurred in the 1860s when Welsh sportsman John Graham Chambers wrote rules based on the use of padded gloves and got aristocrat and sportsman John Douglas, who held the title of the Marquess of Queensberry, to promote the Marquess of Queensberry Rules. The new rules came into use in the United States in the 1880s.

John L. Sullivan became the first American heavyweight champion in 1882 under the bare-knuckle rules and again in 1892 he became the first heavyweight champion of the gloved era. Sullivan trained for his initial heavyweight championship in Belfast, New York. By the end of the 19th century America was becoming the center of professional boxing. The sports economic incentive rose as popularity brought larger purses and commercial success. Sullivan's championships initiated a period of over 100 years of American dominance in the heavyweight class.

Boxing was again being banned in America in the early 1900s, and was mostly outlawed in New York state. A loophole allowed fights to take place in athletic clubs, so many bars became on-the-fly athletic clubs in order to host matches. The Walker Law, passed in 1920, regulated boxing in the state of New York. The law reestablished legal boxing following the three-year ban created by the repeal of the Frawley Law. On December 14, 1920, Jack Dempsey, the heavyweight champion, appeared at Madison Square Garden, knocking out Bill Brennam in the 12th round. The fight drew one of the largest crowds the arena had experienced in that period.

In 2018, Newsday selected the 10 most notable fights that took place in New York:

- Jack Dempsey KO 2 Luis Ángel Firpo, Sept. 14, 1923, Polo Grounds. Dempsey's fifth title defense; over 80,000 watched him defeat the Argentinian.
- James J. Braddock W 15 Max Baer, June 13, 1935, Madison Square Garden Bowl. Braddock, a 10-1 underdog, defeated the heavyweight champion.
- Joe Louis KO 1 Max Schmeling, June 22, 1938, Yankee Stadium. World War II on the horizon, the second fight between Louis and the German Schmeling is remembered as one of the major sports events of the 20th century. Schmeling had stopped Louis in their first fight also at Yankee Stadium two years earlier.
- Joe Louis KO 13 Billy Conn, June 18, 1941, Polo Grounds. Behind after 12 rounds, Louis rallied to win.
- Rocky Marciano TKO 8 Joe Louis, Oct. 26, 1951, Madison Square Garden. Marciano, who was 27, defeated Louis, who was 37.
- Floyd Patterson KO 5 Ingemar Johansson, June 20, 1960, Polo Grounds. Patterson became the first former heavyweight champion in history to regain his title.
- Joe Frazier W 15 Muhammad Ali, March 8, 1971, Madison Square Garden. The fight was billed as “The Fight of the Century”.
- Muhammad Ali W 15 Ken Norton, Sept. 28, 1976, Yankee Stadium. The third fight of their trilogy.
- Lennox Lewis draws with Evander Holyfield, March 13, 1999, Madison Square Garden. A heavyweight title unification bout between WBA-IBF champion Holyfield and WBC champion Lewis.
- Deontay Wilder KO 9 Artur Szpilka, Jan. 16, 2016, Barclays Center. Brooklyn had not hosted a heavyweight title fight in 115 years.

Other fights of note include:

- Bob Fitzsimmons KO of Gus Ruhlin, August 10, 1900, Madison Square Garden.
- Sugar Ray Robinson unanimous decision over Jake LaMotta, October 2, 1942, Madison Square Garden
- Joey Maxim KO of Sugar Ray Robinson, June 24, 1952, Yankee Stadium
- Marciano's Last Fight (vs. Archie Moore), September 21, 1955
- Johansson shocks Patterson, June 26, 1959, Yankee Stadium
- Muhammad Ali's First MSG Fight (Cassius Clay vs. Sonny Banks), February 10, 1962, Madison Square Garden
- Muhammad Ali defeats Joe Frazier, January 28, 1974, Madison Square Garden
- Mike Tyson's First MSG Fight (vs. Mitch Green), May 20, 1986, Madison Square Garden
- Bernard “The Executioner” Hopkins defeated Félix Trinidad for the Undisputed Middleweight Championship, Bernard Hopkins vs. Félix Trinidad, September 29, 2001, Madison Square Garden.

The Daily News Golden Gloves Tournament started in 1927 when The New York Daily News took title and ownership of a citywide amateur boxing tournament with matches taking place at Madison Square Garden.

The first film ever made outdoors in New York was produced in 1895. Woodville Latham and his sons Otway and Gray Latham had invented the Eidoloscope projector, running very crudely like a film projector today. The Latham brothers had debuted test images to the press. But their real test of this device was to film something live and then display it a short time later. So on May 4, 1895, the brothers filmed a boxing match on the rooftop of Madison Square Garden, then on 27rd Street and Madison Avenue. The competitors were ‘Battling’ Charles Barnett and Young Griffo, a legendary Australian boxer.

=== Cycling ===
The bicycle boom of the late 19th century had a strong impact in the area. As a spectator sport, six-day racing was popular and spurred the building of velodromes in the area including Washington Heights, Manhattan, and Jersey City, New Jersey.

Weekly races were held in suburban roads, including Pelham Parkway in the Bronx. The biggest races were in inner city locations, notably at the original Madison Square Garden which had been designed for cycle racing and at the time was located adjacent to Madison Square. The Olympic sport, Madison Racing, is named after cycle races that became popular at Madison Square Garden.

The Kissena Velodrome, a 400-meter (1,300 ft) velodrome, was constructed in the center of Kissena Park in 1962. It was used during the 1964 New York World's Fair and the U.S. team trials for the 1964 Summer Olympics. It is the only remaining bicycle track in New York City.

=== Fencing ===
The New York area is home to many competitive fencing clubs. Fencers Club offers all three weapons (épée, foil and saber), Manhattan Fencing Center offers foil and saber, and New York Athletic Club offers épée and saber.

Other clubs in the city include Brooklyn Bridge Fencing Club, Brooklyn Fencing Center, New York Fencing Academy, Sheridan Fencing Academy, South Brooklyn Fencing Center, Staten Island Fencing Center, Tim Morehouse Fencing Club, Woodside Fencing Center.

=== Golf ===
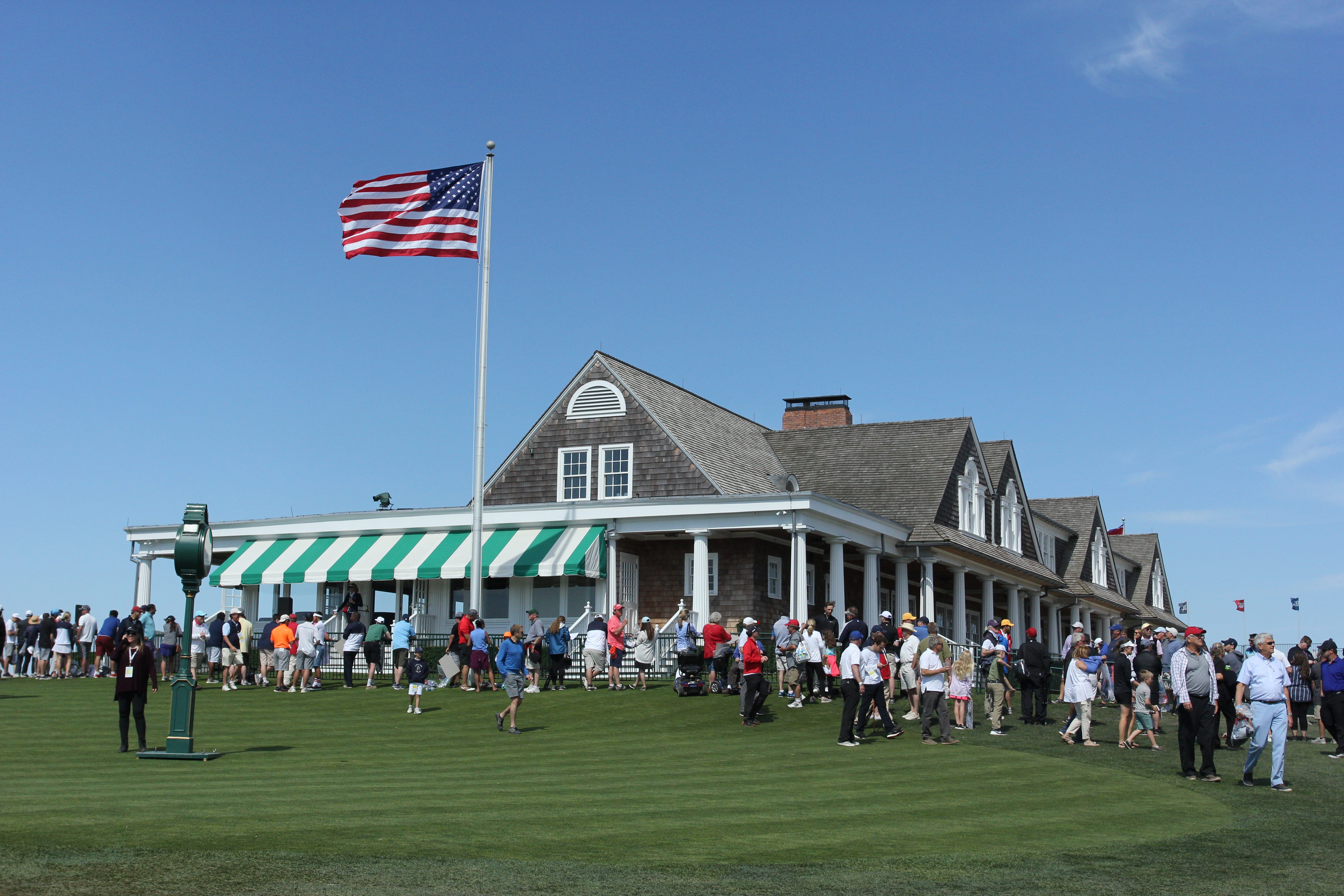
Shinnecock Hills clubhouse at the 2018 U.S. Open

The Saint Andrews Golf Club in Hastings-on-Hudson, organized in 1888, is a founding member of the United States Golf Association (USGA) and is considered the oldest continuously operating golf club in the United States. Opening in 1895, Van Cortlandt Park Golf Course is America's oldest public golf course. Richmond County Country Club on Staten Island along with North Shore Towers and Country Club in the borough of Queens are the only private country clubs in New York City. Golfing greats Bobby Jones (1921 and 1930) and Ben Hogan (1953) were honored with ticker-tape parades down the Canyon of Heroes, after their British Open triumphs.

With its headquarters in Far Hills, New Jersey, the New York area has hosted just about every type of USGA championship. The U.S. Open has been played at Shinnecock Hills Golf Club, Englewood Golf Club, Garden City Golf Club, Baltusrol Golf Club (Lower Course), Inwood Country Club, Winged Foot Golf Club (West Course), Fresh Meadow Country Club, and Bethpage State Park (Black Course, often called "Bethpage Black"). The U.S. Women's Open has been held at Winged Foot Golf Club (East Course), Baltusrol Golf Club (Lower Course and Upper Course), Plainfield Country Club, Sebonack Golf Club, and Trump National Golf Club (Old Course). The USGA has conducted a number of individual amateur championships in the area.

The Professional Golfers' Association of America (PGA), the PGA Tour, the PGA Tour Champions, and the Ladies Professional Golf Association (LPGA) have had events hosted in the area.

The PGA Championship has been held at Engineers Country Club, Inwood Country Club, Pelham Country Club, Salisbury Golf Club (Eisenhower Park), Fresh Meadow Country Club, The Shawnee Inn & Golf Resort (Composite), Pomonok Country Club, Baltusrol Golf Club (Lower Course), Winged Foot Golf Club (West Course), and Bethpage Black. The Trump National Golf Club (Old Course) is a future host of the event. The Ryder Cup has been held at Ridgewood Country Club (Composite) and Bethpage Black. The Presidents Cup has been conducted at Liberty National Golf Club.

For a number of years Westchester Country Club (West Course) was a regular stop on the PGA Tour with the current PGA Tour event, The Barclays, now The Northern Trust, being played at various clubs in the area. The PGA Tour Champions has held events at Meadow Brook Golf Club and Eisenhower Park (Red Course). The first U.S. Senior Open was conducted on the East Course at Winged Foot Golf Club and has also been held at Ridgewood Country Club (Composite). The LPGA tour has conducted events at Wykagyl Country Club, Upper Montclair Country Club (Composite), Pocono Manor (East Course), Deepdale Golf Club, Scarsdale Golf Club, Grossingers Golf Club, Knollwood Country Club, and Forsgate Country Club (Banks Course). In 2015, the LPGA Championship was held at Westchester Country Club (West Course).

On July 13, 1905, Isaac Mackie, the head professional at Fox Hills Golf Course on Staten Island, won an Open Tournament at the Van Cortlandt Park Golf Course, shooting 152 and holding off joint second-place finishers Willie Anderson and Bernard Nicholls who finished at 157. It was the first ever professional tournament held on a public golf course in the United States.

From 1897 to 1933 an Ivy League school won the men's college golf national championship. Consequentially, many New York metropolitan golf courses have hosted the NCAA Division I Men's Golf Championship including: Ardsley Country Club, Garden City Golf Club, Morris County Golf Club, Nassau Country Club, The Apawamis Club, Essex County Country Club, Baltusrol Golf Club (Old Course), Greenwich Country Club, Siwanoy Country Club, Deal Golf and Country Club, Springdale Golf Club (Princeton University), and The Shawnee Inn & Golf Resort (Composite).

One of the most unique golf courses in the area was the Governors Island Golf Course due to its views of the Brooklyn and the Manhattan skyline, with the Statue of Liberty as a backdrop. It was considered the only golf course in Manhattan as the island is technically part of the borough. Golf was played on Governors Island from 1903 through 1996. In 2006 over $1 million was spent to temporarily restore green complexes abandoned in 1996 and an 18-hole course was routed for a charity event that also promoted the island's opportunities. The Manhattan Golf Classic was conducted in October of that year. The event was billed as the "first ever professional golf tournament in the history of New York City", although Fresh Meadow Country Club, when it was in Queens had hosted two major championships in the 1930s, and Van Cortland Park Golf Course in The Bronx and the Fox Hills Golf Course on Staten Island had conducted professional events in the early 1900s.

=== Horse racing ===
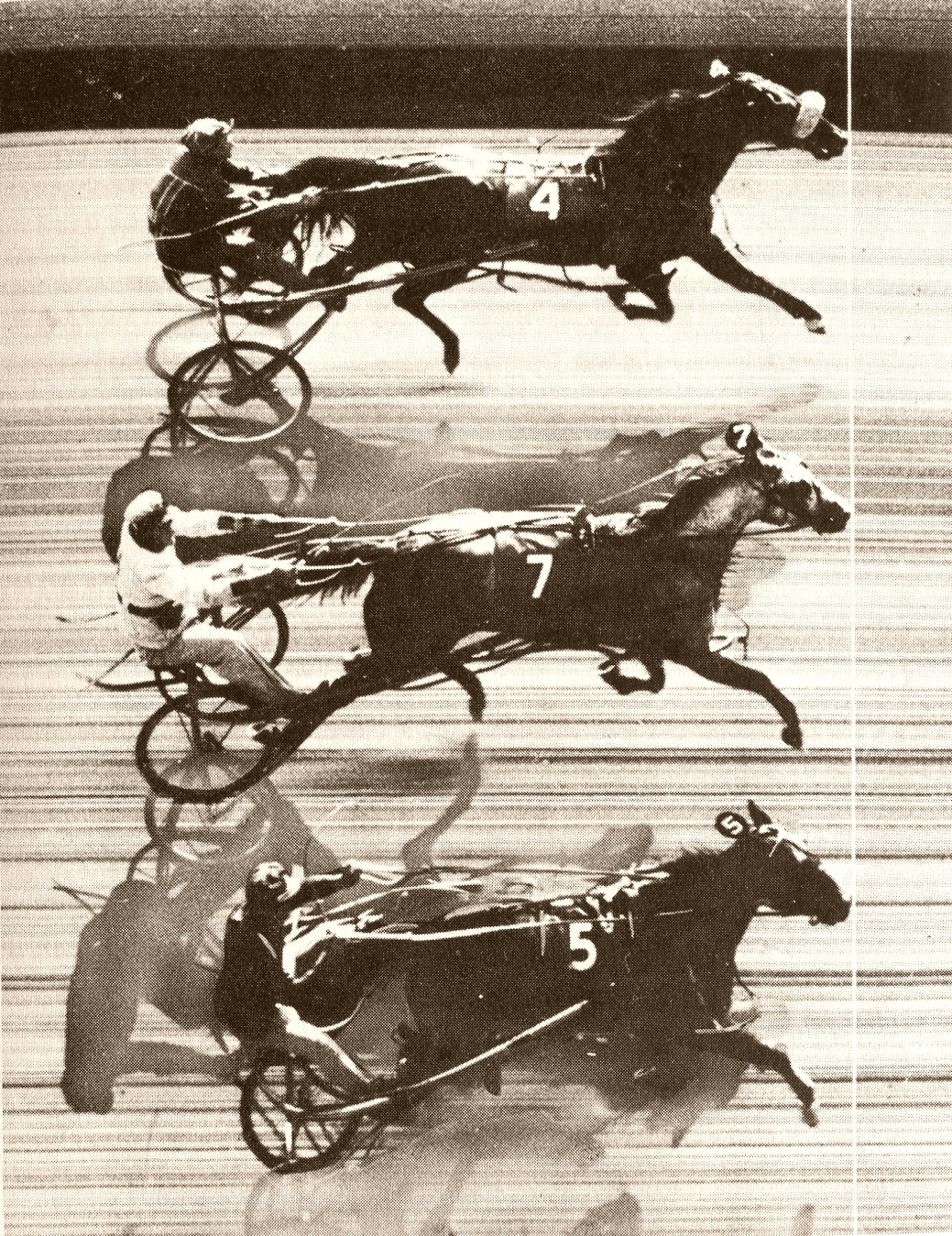
An extremely rare photo finish triple dead heat, recorded in a 1953 harness race at Freehold Raceway

Horse racing in the United States dates back to 1665, with the establishment of the New Market course in Salisbury, New York. Salisbury was a section of what is now known as Hempstead Plains, near Greater Westbury and East Garden City in Nassau County on Long Island. New Market was the first regulated form of horse racing in North America. The races were facilitated and supervised by New York's colonial governor, Richard Nicolls, and race winners were awarded with the first known sporting trophies in the country.

In 1824, as regional rivalries in the country were growing, the Union Course in Woodhaven, Queens offered a $24,000 prize for a race between top thoroughbreds American Eclipse, from the North, and Sir Henry, from the South. It is believed that the race between Eclipse and Sir Henry was America's first national sporting event.

Major New York metropolitan racetracks, listed by the year they were opened:

- Union Course in Woodhaven, Queens, New York (1821–1872)
- Centreville Course (Eclipse Course) in Woodhaven, Queens, New York (1825–1899)
- Freehold Raceway in Freehold, New Jersey (1830s)
- Jerome Park Racetrack in Westchester County, New York (1866–1894)
- Gravesend Race Track in Gravesend on Coney Island, Brooklyn, New York (1866–1910)
- Monmouth Park Racetrack in Oceanport, New Jersey (1870)
- Brighton Beach Race Course in Brighton Beach, Brooklyn, New York (1879–1920s)
- Sheepshead Bay Race Track in Sheepshead Bay, Brooklyn, New York (1880–1923)
- Aqueduct Racetrack (The Big A) in Ozone Park, Queens, New York (1894–2026)
- Morris Park Racecourse in Westchester County, New York (1889–1904)
- Yonkers Raceway in Yonkers, New York (1899)
- Jamaica Race Course in Jamaica, New York (1903–1959)
- Belmont Park in Elmont, New York (1905)
- Roosevelt Raceway in Westbury, New York (1940–1988)
- Meadowlands Racetrack in East Rutherford, New Jersey (1977)

In 1908, the New York State Legislature approved the Hart–Agnew Law, which banned gambling at racetracks. Some tracks shut down permanently, but later a court ruled that oral betting was legal as the law only covered bookmakers, so activity continued. In 1955 the non-profit New York Racing Association (originally the Greater New York Association) was founded.

Belmont Park's mile-and-a-half main track is the longest dirt Thoroughbred race course in North America, and it has the sport's largest grandstand. Belmont Park hosts the Belmont Stakes, an American Grade I stakes Thoroughbred horse race held each June (although with Belmont Park closed for reconstruction from 2024–2026, the race was moved upstate to Saratoga for that period). The Belmont Stakes is the third leg of the Triple Crown of Thoroughbred Racing in the United States.

=== Lacrosse ===
Long Island high schools produced 4 of the 11 players on the 2002 NCAA Division I All-American First Team, with 16 players from the area honored in total. That year, the NCAA Division II All-American list included players from Long Island, and most NCAA Division I, II, and III lacrosse teams included at least one player from the region. At the 2002 NCAA Division I championships, three of the four men's teams were coached by individuals from Long Island and all four teams had a captain from the area.

By some accounts, lacrosse was almost as big as baseball in New York City in the first decade of the 20th century. After learning the game in New York City and moving to Long Island, Jason Stranahan started the first high school lacrosse program at Manhasset High School in 1933; football Hall of Famer Jim Brown played lacrosse at Manhasset and is considered by some as the greatest lacrosse player of all time. By the 1950s, the sport was embedded across Nassau County but had still failed to reach Suffolk County. Huntington High School fielded that county's first varsity team in 1957. In the 1960s, there was a large migration to Long Island which resulted in high schools hiring a sizable number of teachers and coaches that coincidentally had college lacrosse backgrounds and the desire to build powerful programs.

The New York metropolitan area was home to a Major League Lacrosse team called the New York Lizards, formerly the Long Island Lizards, before that league merged with the Premier Lacrosse League in December 2020. The PLL plays a tour-based schedule, visiting a series of American and Canadian cities where the sport enjoys significant popularity; currently, the league's New York-area stop is Sports Illustrated Stadium. The New Jersey Pride, also of the former MLL, played in Piscataway, New Jersey but suspended operations after the 2008 season. The New York Titans also played in the New York area before moving to Orlando. The New York Saints were members of the National Lacrosse League at Nassau Veterans Memorial Coliseum from 1987 to 2003. They were previously the New Jersey Saints.

In December 2018 it was announced that professional indoor lacrosse would begin play in 2019 on Long Island. The New York Riptide were the 13th team to join the National Lacrosse League. Games are played in NYCB Live's Nassau Coliseum. In 2024, NLL announced that Riptide will be relocating to Ottawa and renamed to the Ottawa Black Bears in the 2024–2025 season due to poor attendance.

=== Motorsports ===
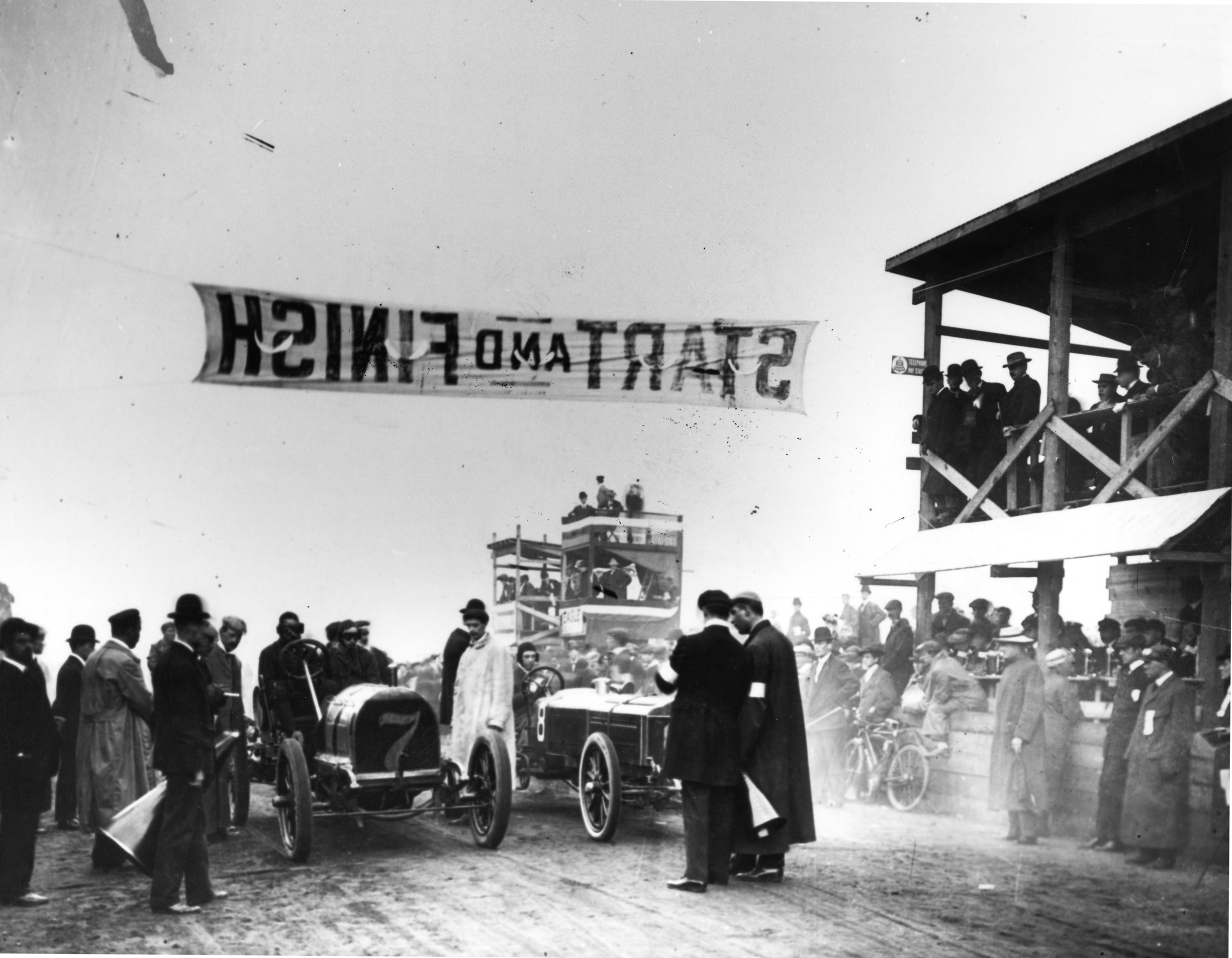
Vanderbilt Cup race start, 1905

In 1904, auto enthusiast and railroad heir William Kissam Vanderbilt II organized an auto race on the public roads of Long Island. The prize, a massive silver cup from the Tiffany studio, known as the Vanderbilt Cup, attracted top racers from Mercedes, Packard, and Fiat. The race took place on country roads with hundreds of spectators watching cars go by at speeds close to 100 miles per hour. In 1906, several spectators were killed when a car went off the road. Vanderbilt responded quickly by building a 45-mile private highway. Races resumed in 1908, but another accident killed spectators in 1910 making organizers abandon the Long Island course for good. The Vanderbilt Cup returned in 1936 and 1937 at Roosevelt Raceway in Westbury, Long Island. The 1937 race was one of the greatest races in New York State's history, featuring the only pre-WWII appearance of the German racing team in the United States. Legendary driver Ralph DePalma served as the honorary starter for the race where the starting signal came from President Franklin D. Roosevelt's Hyde Park home via Western Union Telegraph.

From 1953 until 1972 stock car races were held weekly from May until October at a 1/5th-mile asphalt racetrack on Staten Island. The local dairy, owned by the Weissglass family, financed promoter Gabe Rispoli with $700 so he could make improvements to an existing sporting facility that became known as Weissglass Stadium.

Oval track racing continues to this day at Riverhead Raceway, a quarter-mile short track located in Riverhead at the East End of Long Island. The track plays host to the NASCAR Whelen All-American Series for weekly short-track racing and the Whelen Modified Tour national series.

Founded in 1965, Old Bridge Township Raceway Park located in Old Bridge Township, Middlesex County, New Jersey hosted the SuperNationals and later the Summernationals of the National Hot Rod Association (NHRA) for Funny Car and Top Fuel competitions, as well as other drag racing events. In 2018, the track announced that they would cease conducting drag races at the facility due to rising costs. However, other motorsports events still occur at the facility.

Championship Auto Racing Teams (CART) held races at the Meadowlands from 1984 to 1991.

On September 21, 2016, the Fédération Internationale de l'Automobile (FIA), Formula E, and New York City government officials announced that the New York City ePrix would be held in July 2017 at the Brooklyn Cruise Terminal, with a track layout presented. The New York ePrix became the city's first automobile race since 1896. On July 15–16, 2017, the Formula E race was held in Red Hook, Brooklyn. It was the first FIA-sanctioned race to be held in New York City. Sam Bird won both races.

There was a plan by the International Speedway Corporation (ISC) to build an 82,000-seat speedway on Staten Island that would host National Association for Stock Car Auto Racing (NASCAR) races by 2010. The ISC abandoned the plan in 2006 citing financial concerns, and sold the 676 acre parcel in 2013. Another speedway project was proposed for the Meadowlands (Liberty Speedway) but discussions were abandoned in the early 2000s. Plans called for a Formula One race known as the Grand Prix of America, to be held on the New Jersey side of the Hudson River, were scheduled to start in 2014, but those plans have been postponed indefinitely. The race was to be held on the Port Imperial Street Circuit, a 3.2-mile (5.1 km) circuit to be built using existing streets in Weehawken and West New York around Weehawken Port Imperial.

=== Polo ===
Polo, considered by some to be world's oldest team sport, has a long history in the New York area, especially on Long Island.

In 1876, James Gordon Bennett, a noted American publisher, introduced the sport of polo to New York City. He organized the first polo match in the United States at Dickel's Riding Academy at 39th Street and Fifth Avenue. In the spring of 1876, a group of polo players established the first formal American polo club, the Westchester Polo Club, in New York. On May 13, 1876, the Jerome Park Racetrack in Westchester County was the site of the first American outdoor polo match. The Westchester Polo Club alternated their playing seasons between New York and Rhode Island before making Newport their permanent home.

The Meadowbrook Polo Club is among the most historic polo clubs in the United States with its roots dating back to 1877 when Thomas Hitchcock Sr., Oliver W. Bird, August Belmont, Benjamin Nicoll, and their associates participated in the first polo match on Long Island. The polo match was played on the infield of the racetrack of the Mineola Fairgrounds. The Meadowbrook Polo Club, originally located in East Meadow and Jericho and currently located in Old Westbury, was formally incorporated in 1881. The Meadowbrook Polo Club's first polo field was created in 1884, leading to Long Island's role as "Polo Capital of the World" during the 1920s and 1930s.

Besides Meadowbrook other polo clubs in the area include: Equuleus Polo Club, Shannon Hill Polo Club, Greenwich Polo Club, Princeton University Polo, Fairfield County Hunt Club, North Fork Polo Club. The Rockaway Hunting Club and Piping Rock Club are country clubs with polo fields and golf courses on Long Island.

=== Quadball ===
The New York Titans is an expansion team play in the Major League Quadball in 2015, also they're won their first league championship during the 2024 season and second title following the 2026 season.

=== Rowing ===
During the 19th century professional rowing (a.k.a. "crew" in America) was the most popular sport in the nation, and the waters around New York City were home to some of the most successful and popular competitors at the time. Amateurs also proliferated the area, and remain successful and influential in the sport, though professional rowing has been banned nationally for over a century because of corruption. Both college teams and clubs ply the traditionally popular Harlem River and other waters around the city. The Harlem River was the traditional rowing course for New York, analogous to the Charles River in Boston and the Schuylkill River in Philadelphia. On the Harlem's banks is the boathouse for the Columbia University crew, and the river is the home course for the university's crew. Since 1952, a large flat rock face, called the "(Big) C Rock" has been painted with Columbia's varsity "C". The river is used by crews from New York University, Fordham University, and Manhattan University, though the only university with permanent facilities currently on the river is Columbia. Formerly, a number of boathouses lined the Sherman Creek inlet off the river, but each was destroyed by suspected arson over the course of the 1970s. The last boathouse before the 1990s Peter Jay Sharp Boathouse to be on the creek was the Fordham Boathouse, which burned in 1977.

=== Rugby league ===
The city currently has two rugby league teams, the New York Knights and the Brooklyn Kings RLFC who play in the USA Rugby League.

=== Rugby union ===
The city has two division one rugby union teams, the New York Athletic Club RFC, which was established in 1973 and the Old Blue, both who play in the Rugby Super League (rugby union). The city has other amateur rugby union clubs as well, paying in the Metropolitan New York Rugby Football Union. The clubs have contributed to the national team, the Eagles, who have participated at the Rugby World Cup.

New York got a professional rugby team in 2019 with Rugby United New York (RUNY) at MCU Park as a member of Major League Rugby. RUNY was formed by James Kennedy and former WWE wrestler, John Layfield. New York and USA Rugby veteran Mike Tolkin was named head coach after previously coaching the USA national side and the local club side NYAC.

The New York Exiles are an semi-professional women's rugby union team and competed in Women's Elite Rugby’s inaugural season in 2025.

=== Running ===
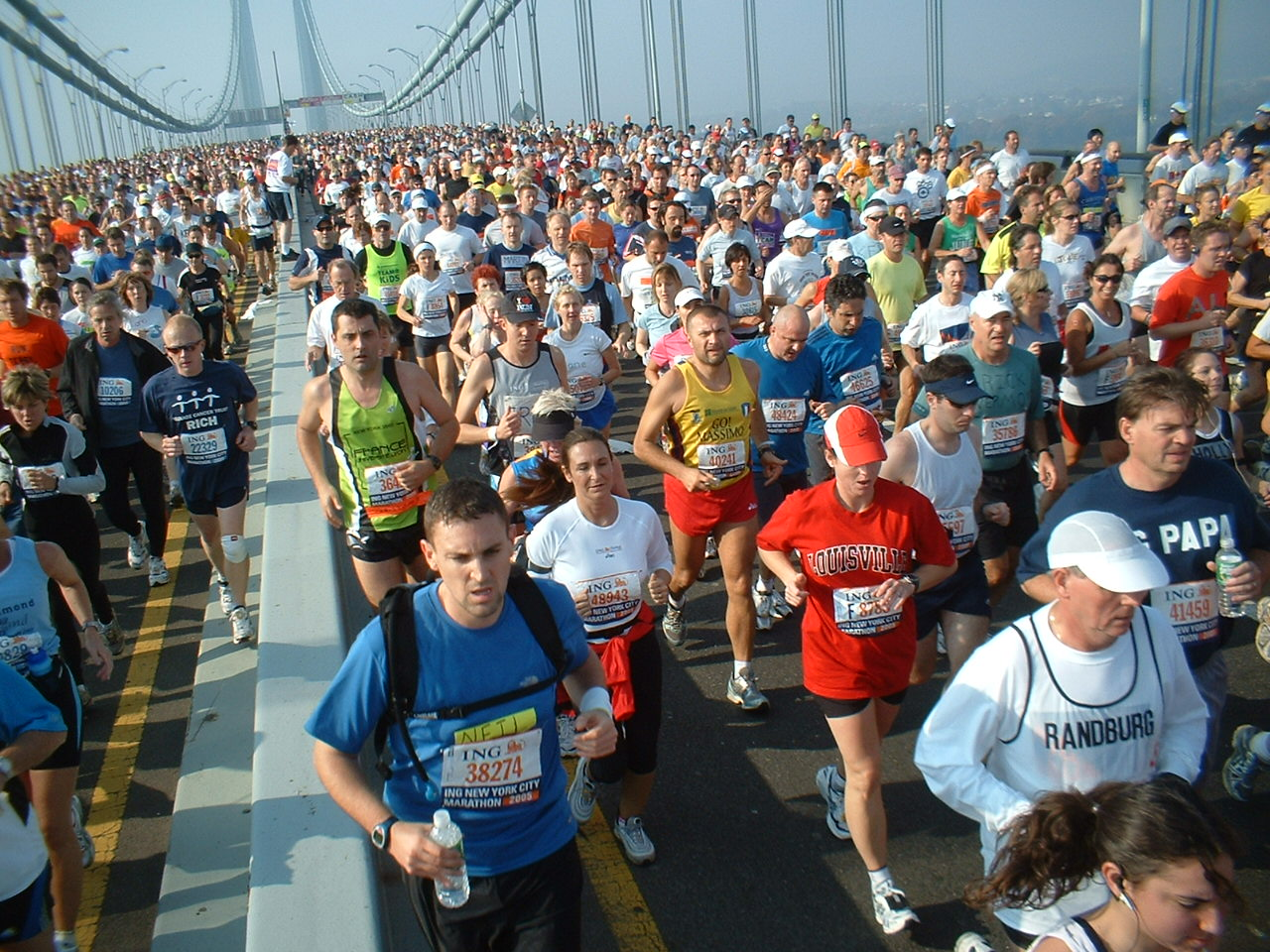
Marathon runners crossing the Verrazzano–Narrows Bridge just after race start

The New York City Marathon is a foot race run over a 42.2 km (26.2 mi) course through the five boroughs of New York City. Next to the Boston Marathon, it is considered the preeminent long-distance running event in the United States. The race is conducted by the New York Road Runners organization and has been held annually since 1970 on the first Sunday of November. The marathon attracts top professional and amateur marathoners from all over the world. Due to the popularity of the event, participation is limited to 35,000 entrants chosen by a lottery system, with preference given to previous participants.

The Millrose Games is an indoor track and field meet that has been held on the first Friday in February at Madison Square Garden since the current site of the arena opened in 1968. The meet was conducted at previous versions of The Garden starting in 1914. In 2012 the Millrose Games were moved to the Armory in Upper Manhattan. The games started when employees of the Wanamaker's department store formed the Millrose Track Club to hold a meet. The featured event is the Wanamaker Mile which was first conducted in 1926.

Van Cortlandt Park in The Bronx is a prominent site for cross-country running. The parks trails are some of the most utilized cross-country courses in the United States. Van Cortlandt is the venue for the annual IC4A or Intercollegiate Association of Amateur Athletes of America (ICAAAA) cross country championships. The 1968 and 1969 NCAA Men's Division I Cross Country Championship was hosted by Manhattan University at Van Cortlandt. The distance for the championship race was 6 miles (9.7 kilometers).

The Ocean Breeze Track and Field Athletic Complex is a state-of-the-art indoor track and field facility in Ocean Breeze Park which is part of the South Beach section of Staten Island. On November 19, 2015, the complex became the first facility in the United States to be recognized as a certified International Amateur Athletic Federation (IAAF) facility. A project under Mayor Bloomberg's Design Excellence initiative, the athletic complex was designed as part of the PlaNYC 110-acre Ocean Breeze regional park.

=== Tennis ===
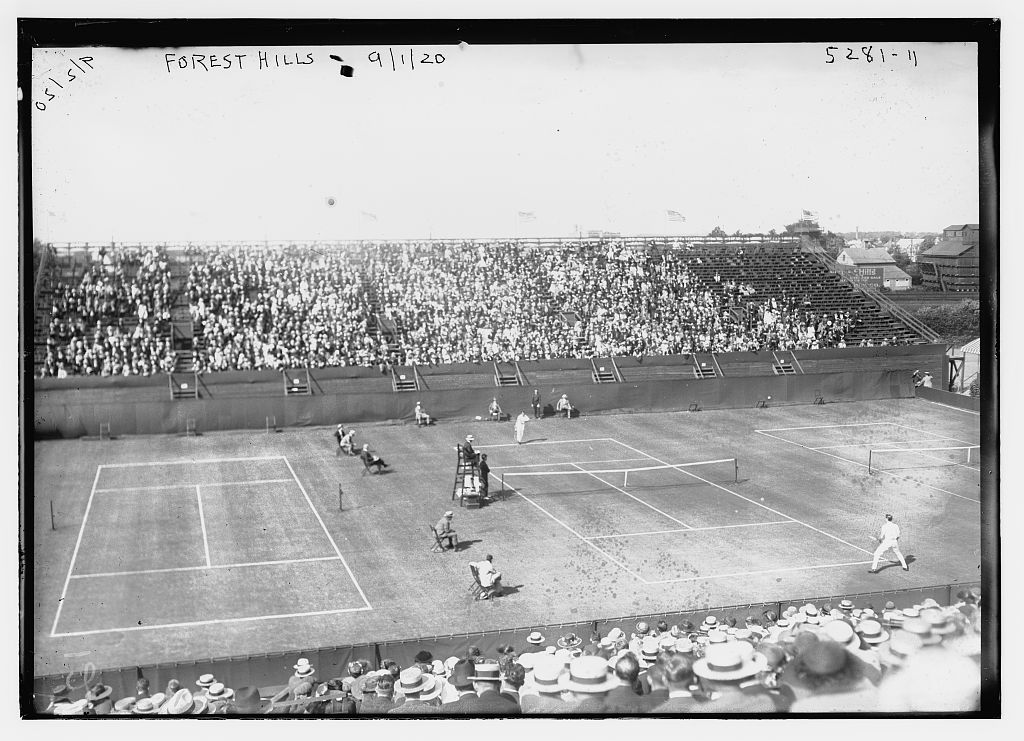
Forest Hills tennis courts in Queens, New York in 1920

Tennis is said to have made its debut in the United States in 1874 on Staten Island thanks to Mary Ewing Outerbridge. The first American National championship was played at the Staten Island Cricket and Baseball Club in September 1880.

The U.S. Tennis Open is the fourth and final event of the Grand Slam tennis tournaments and is held annually in late summer at the USTA Billie Jean King National Tennis Center in Flushing Meadows Park in Queens. The main tournament consists of five championships: men's and women's singles, men's and women's doubles and mixed doubles, with additional tournaments for junior and wheelchair players.

The National Tennis Center, open to the public whenever the USTA is not holding an event, features the world's largest stadium built specifically for the sport, the 22,547-seat Arthur Ashe Stadium.

The New York Empire began play in World TeamTennis (WTT) in 2016. Home matches were played at Forest Hills Stadium in Queens.

Other teams have represented the New York City metropolitan area in WTT in the past. The New York Sets, who changed their name to New York Apples in 1977, were a charter franchise of the league and played from 1974 to 1978. The Sets originally played their home matches at Nassau Veterans Memorial Coliseum before splitting their home schedule between the Coliseum and Madison Square Garden. By the 1978 season, many home matches were played in the Felt Forum with those featuring marquee opponents played in the Garden's main arena. The franchise won the league championship in 1976 and 1977, and featured star players Billie Jean King, Virginia Wade, Sandy Mayer and Phil Dent. The two title-winning teams were coached by Fred Stolle. Following the 1978 season, the Apples announced they were folding. Soon afterward, WTT suspended operations, and there were no 1979 or 1980 seasons.

The New Jersey Stars joined WTT as an expansion franchise in 1987, playing their home matches in Franklin Township, Somerset County, New Jersey. The team went 0–14 in its inaugural season but, with a completely remade roster, reached the TeamTennis Final in 1988. Home matches were moved to Chatham Borough, New Jersey in 1989, when the team was led by Tracy Austin. The signing of Martina Navratilova in 1994 produced immediate results on the court as the Stars won the league title in both 1994 and 1995. However, the team was unable to build a fan base and relocated, as two-time defending WTT champions, to become the Delaware Smash for the 1996 season.

The New York Hamptons were added as a WTT expansion franchise in 2000, playing their home matches in East Quogue, New York. They moved to Amagansett in 2002. In 2003, Sportime NY became the team's majority owner. Home matches were moved to Mamaroneck in Westchester County, and the team's name was changed to the New York Sportimes. Led by Martina Hingis, the Sportimes won the 2005 WTT title. In 2009, the Sportimes moved to New York City, playing their home matches on Randall's Island. Before the 2011 season, the Sportimes merged with the New York Buzz, which had been based in the Capital District since 1995. Following the merger, the team played some of its home matches on Randall's Island and others in either Albany or Troy, New York. Following the 2013 season, the team was sold, and the new owner relocated it and renamed it the San Diego Aviators. Ironically, the Aviators won their first league title after relocation in New York City at Forest Hills Stadium, which was selected as the site for the 2016 WTT Final to welcome the expansion New York Empire to the league.

The New York Slice is a professional table tennis team based in the New York metropolitan area to play in the Major League Table Tennis. The franchise was announced as one of two expansion teams for the league's third season in early 2025.

=== Ultimate ===
The New York Rumble were a professional ultimate (commonly called "ultimate frisbee") league that competed in Major League Ultimate (MLU) from the league's inaugural season in 2013. MLU suspended operations in 2016.

The New York Empire, also founded in 2013, compete in the Ultimate Frisbee Association (previously called the American Ultimate Disc League). The Empire won championships in 2019, 2022, and 2023.

In 2019, the Premier Ultimate League, a women's professional ultimate league, was formed with the New York Gridlock as a founding member. The Gridlock won their first championship in 2024.

=== eSports ===
The New York Excelsior (NYXL) was an American professional Overwatch League (OWL) team representing New York City as one of 12 founding members of the Overwatch League. NYXL competes as a member of the league's Atlantic Division. The team folded when the Overwatch League folded on January 23, 2024.

The Cloud9 New York are an American professional Call of Duty League (CDL) team based in New York City, announced as one of the first five cities to own a spot in the CDL. The C9NY won the 2023 Call of Duty League Championship as the New York Subliners.

Both NYCFC and the New York Red Bulls field players in eMLS, Major League Soccer's esports league.

=== Other sports ===
The Suffolk Sting are a professional inline hockey team and part of the PIHA. They play at the Rapid Fire Arena on Long Island.

The New York Arrows represented the New York area in the Major Soccer League (MISL) from 1978 to 1984 at Nassau Veterans Memorial Coliseum

The New Jersey Rockets played in the MISL with their home games in East Rutherford, New Jersey during the 1981–82 season. The Rockets filed for protection under Chapter 11 of the U.S. Bankruptcy Code late in the season and folded shortly thereafter.

The New York Express played indoor soccer in the Major Indoor Soccer League at Nassau Veterans Memorial Coliseum in 1986–1987.

The Long Island Academy play at Competition Field at Adelphi University in the National Premier Soccer League as of 2006.

The Long Island Jawz played Roller Hockey at Nassau Veterans Memorial Coliseum in 1996.

The Long Island Rough Riders and Long Island Rough Riders (UWS) play soccer and women's soccer since 1994 at Cy Donnelly Stadium in South Huntington, and formerly at Belson Stadium, Mitchel Athletic Complex, Michael Tully Field, Citibank Park and Stony Brook University Stadium.

The Long Island Roller Rebels started in 2005 as a roller derby league featuring four teams: All Stars (A team), Rock-A-Betty Bruisers (B team), Ladies of Laceration, Wicked Wheelers and were aided by the Gotham Girls Roller Derby. They play in Old Bethpage.

Gaelic games have been played in New York since the foundation of the Gaelic Athletic Association. New York is considered a GAA county and plays in the Connacht Senior Football Championship.

The United States Australian Football League is the biggest League of Australian rules football in the United States and the New York team is called The New York Magpies it is affiliated with the Collingwood Football Club.

Squash is organized by the New York Squash, formerly known as New York Metropolitan Squash Racquets Association, which was founded in 1924 and incorporated in 1932. This organization is a not for profit.

There is a thriving field hockey competition in New York City, played predominantly by European and Commonwealth expats. The North East Field Hockey Association plays games at Columbia University, Hofstra University, DeWitt Clinton High School and Drew University. Teams from New York also regularly compete in indoor and outdoor tournaments around the country.

New York is considered to be the "world capital" of one-wall handball.

The New York Emperors Stickball League has nine stickball teams in New York City. Stickball, a street version of baseball, was popularized by youths in working-class Italian, German, and Irish neighborhoods in the 1930s.

== College sports ==
Although the New York area is home to numerous colleges, many of which have rich athletic histories, college sports is a somewhat less visible part of the regional sports landscape.

The following NCAA Division I schools are located in the metropolitan area, as most broadly defined. The following details about the table should be noted:

- Schools are in New York state unless otherwise indicated.
- The "Conference" column includes each school's primary affiliation.
- All affiliations listed here are current as of the upcoming 2024–25 school year.
- The "Football" column indicates the following:
  - Whether a school sponsors the sport at varsity level.
  - The level at which a school competes in that sport—either in the Football Bowl Subdivision (FBS) or the Football Championship Subdivision (FCS). If a school's conference affiliation in football differs from its main affiliation, the football conference is also listed.

Team	School	City	Conference	Football
Army Black Knights	United States Military Academy	West Point	Patriot League	FBS (American)
Columbia Lions	Columbia University	New York City (Manhattan)	Ivy League	FCS
Fairfield Stags	Fairfield University	Fairfield, Connecticut	MAAC	No
Fairleigh Dickinson Knights	Fairleigh Dickinson University (Note: More accurately, the Knights represent the university's Metropolitan Campus, which straddles Teaneck and Hackensack. FDU's Florham Campus, located in Madison, New Jersey, has a separate NCAA Division III athletic program.)	Teaneck, New Jersey	Northeast	No
Fordham Rams	Fordham University	New York City (The Bronx)	Atlantic 10	FCS (Patriot League)
Hofstra Pride	Hofstra University	Hempstead	CAA	No
Iona Gaels	Iona University	New Rochelle	MAAC	No
LIU Sharks	Long Island University	Brooklyn; Brookville, New York	Northeast	FCS
Manhattan Jaspers	Manhattan University	New York City (The Bronx)	MAAC	No
Montclair State Red Hawks	Montclair State University	Montclair, New Jersey	NJAC	Division III (NJAC)
Monmouth Hawks	Monmouth University	West Long Branch, New Jersey	CAA	FCS (CAA Football) (Note: CAA Football is administered by the multi-sports Coastal Athletic Association, but is a separate legal entity.)
NJIT Highlanders	New Jersey Tech	Newark, New Jersey	AmEast	No
Princeton Tigers	Princeton University	Princeton, New Jersey	Ivy League	FCS
Quinnipiac Bobcats	Quinnipiac University	Hamden, Connecticut	MAAC	No
Rider Broncs	Rider University	Lawrenceville, New Jersey	MAAC	No
Rutgers Scarlet Knights	Rutgers University (Note: More accurately, the Scarlet Knights represent the school's main campus, Rutgers University–New Brunswick, which is divided between New Brunswick and Piscataway. Most of the athletic facilities are in Piscataway. The other two campuses of Rutgers, in Camden and Newark, have separate memberships in NCAA Division III.)	Piscataway, New Jersey	Big Ten	FBS
Sacred Heart Pioneers	Sacred Heart University	Fairfield, Connecticut	MAAC	FCS (Independent)
St. John's Red Storm	St. John's University	New York City (Queens)	Big East	No
Saint Peter's Peacocks	Saint Peter's University	Jersey City, New Jersey	MAAC	No
Seton Hall Pirates	Seton Hall University	South Orange, New Jersey	Big East	No
Stony Brook Seawolves	Stony Brook University	Stony Brook	CAA	FCS (CAA Football)
Wagner Seahawks	Wagner College	New York City (Staten Island)	Northeast	FCS
Yale Bulldogs	Yale University	New Haven, Connecticut	Ivy League	FCS

== Sports culture ==
Although in much of the rest of the country American football has surpassed baseball as the most popular professional sport, in New York, baseball arguably still stirs the most passion and interest. A championship win by any major sports team is considered to be worthy of the highest celebration, including a ticker-tape parade for the victorious team. In the past, ticker-tape parades have been held for the Yankees, Mets, Giants and Rangers. New Yorkers, however, tend to rally around any of the local teams who win (such as the 1994 Stanley Cup champions New York Rangers, or the 2007 New York Giants).

== Rivalries ==
Due to their geographic locations, New York has intense sports rivalries with the cities of Boston, Philadelphia, and Washington, D.C. in addition to the natural rivalries that exist between the area's own teams.

=== Boston ===
Boston and New York teams have the most intense, heated, and beefiest rivalries in all of American sports. Decades before professional baseball became popular, New York and Boston claimed distinctive versions of bat-and-ball games. A variant of baseball known as The Massachusetts Game was played in New England in the 1850s, while New York teams played by the Knickerbocker Rules set up by Alexander Cartwright. The New York rules eventually became the basis for the modern sport of baseball.

Teams in Boston and New York have many well-known rivalries across respective sports, famously the long-time feud between the Boston Red Sox and New York Yankees in Major League Baseball. This caused the New York~~–~~Boston rivalry to extend into the National Football League, between the New York Jets and the New England Patriots, and the National Basketball Association, between the New York Knicks and the Boston Celtics. The New York Rangers have been long-time rivals with the Boston Bruins due to the fact that both teams are members of the National Hockey League's Original Six franchises, but this has been eclipsed by the Metropolitan Division rivalries in recent years.

The rivalry has also spread to other teams not in the same league. The 1986 World Series between the New York Mets and the Boston Red Sox is considered a classic especially the 6th game and the famous Bill Buckner error. The New York Giants and New England Patriots have played two classic Super Bowls: Super Bowl XLII which features the Helmet Catch and Super Bowl XLVI. There is also a rivalry between the Boston Celtics and the Brooklyn Nets. While Major League Soccer has two teams in the New York area and one in the Boston area, the rivalry between New York City FC and the New York Red Bulls overshadows either team's rivalry with the New England Revolution.

=== Philadelphia ===
In each of the four sports leagues, as well as Major League Soccer, there is intra-division competition between teams from New York and Philadelphia, as seen in the rivalries between the New York Mets and the Philadelphia Phillies in Major League Baseball, the New York Giants and the Philadelphia Eagles in the National Football League, and the New York Rangers and the Philadelphia Flyers in the National Hockey League. There is also a rivalry between the Brooklyn Nets and the Philadelphia 76ers of the National Basketball Association, although it is not as intense as the other three rivalries. There is another rivalry between the New York Knicks and the Philadelphia 76ers. As in the case of Boston, the rivalries between New York City FC and the New York Red Bulls with the Philadelphia Union have a lower profile than that of the two New York-area teams.

In the first season of the Overwatch League the Philadelphia Fusion was the first team to beat the previously undefeated New York Excelsior in regular season play. Excelsior was a strong team throughout the season, bringing home two of the four stage titles and entering the post-season playoffs at the highest seed. However, in a surprise upset Philadelphia knocked New York out of the playoffs and went on to come in second place in the finals as both the first and last team to defeat New York in the 2018 season.

The metropolitan area's three NHL teams tend to be primary rivals with one another, although they each have their own rivalry with the Flyers. Unlike baseball and football, the local teams in the New York area are in the same division and are therefore in direct competition with one another.

=== Washington, D.C. ===
Sports teams in New York City and Washington, D.C. have long been strong rivals. The prominence of each city in America's media landscape has helped increase the notoriety of these rivalries, as has the fact that many teams in each city play in the same division.

The most historic sports rivalry between teams of these two cities is the rivalry between the New York Giants and the Washington Commanders in the National Football League. Both teams play in the Eastern division of the National Football Conference, meaning that they play against each other twice every regular season. Both teams are among the oldest and most successful in professional football. Their rivalry goes back to 1932, and has included some of the game's greatest players and coaches throughout the decades.

In addition, two of the National Hockey League's teams based in the New York metropolitan areas (the New York Rangers and New York Islanders) have developed passionate rivalries with the Washington Capitals, as all three compete in the Metropolitan Division of the Eastern Conference. Both the Capitals–Rangers rivalry and Capitals–Islanders rivalry have increased in intensity over the decades as a result of highly competitive playoff matchups in addition to regular season encounters. The New Jersey Devils also play in the Metropolitan Division and are a division rival for the Capitals, though this rivalry is not as historic and intense as the ones with the two New York-based teams.

There is also a historic rivalry between the New York Red Bulls and D.C. United of Major League Soccer. Both teams are two of the oldest and most historic teams in the league, and their rivalry dates back to 1996, the league's inaugural season. Both teams play in the Eastern Conference. Their rivalry is known as the Atlantic Cup, which is also the name of the trophy awarded to the team that wins the matchup.

The Washington Nationals and New York Mets of Major League Baseball also share a rivalry. Though this rivalry is not as historic as the others mentioned here, the two compete in the NL East. This has naturally helped create a rivalry between the two teams since the Nationals moved to Washington, D.C., in 2005.

== Olympic bids ==
New York and Los Angeles submitted bids to the USOC for the 1984 Summer Olympics. The USOC voted to submit Los Angeles' bid to the IOC, which was the only bid for those games. While Los Angeles secured the right to host the 1984 Summer Olympics, New York served as host of the 1984 Summer Paralympics.

In 2005, New York City bid to host the 2012 Summer Olympics, but lost to London. It was the first time the USOC submitted a bid from New York City to the IOC. Upon the USOC reaching a new revenue-sharing agreement with the IOC in May 2012, New York was mentioned as a potential candidate for the 2024 Summer Olympics, but the city declined to submit a bid to the USOC. Los Angeles was selected as the American candidate for the 2024 Olympics and ultimately secured the right to host the 2028 Summer Olympics.

In June 2026, Governor Kathy Hochul formed an exploratory committee to study a potential New York City-Lake Placid bid for the 2042 Winter Olympics.

== Sports media ==
Newspapers such as The New York Times and the New York Post have lengthy sports sections. In addition, the Sports Illustrated specialty magazine has been published since 1954.

The New York metropolitan area has three major regional sports television networks: YES Network, MSG Network (with sister channel MSG Sportsnet) and SportsNet New York. It also has five sports radio stations:

Call sign	Frequency	Licensee	Format
WADO	1280 AM	Uforia	TUDN Radio
WEPN	1050 AM	Good Karma	ESPN Radio
WFAN	660 AM	Audacy	Infinity Sports Network; NFL on Westwood One
WFAN-FM	101.9 FM	Audacy	Infinity Sports Network
WHSQ	880 AM	Audacy	ESPN Radio

== See also ==
- List of New York City metropolitan area sports teams
- Multiple major sports championship seasons
- Sports in Brooklyn
- Sports in Jersey City, New Jersey
- Sports in Newark, New Jersey
