= New York Emperors Stickball League =

- Sport: Stickball
- Founded: 1985
- CEO: NYESL Board
- No. of teams: 9
- Country: United States
- Website: http://www.stickball.com/

The New York Emperors Stickball League is a stickball league in The Bronx, New York City. Established in 1985, the league has nine teams and a youth division. The seasons lasts from 180 games to 240 games a season.

== Current teams ==
- Jersey City Saints
- Bronx Diamondbacks
- Emperors
- Silver Bullets
- Leland Legends
- Bronx Royals
- The Gold
- Bronx Ravens
- Sugar Hill

== Emperors Memorial Day Weekend Classic ==
The Emperors League hosts an annual tournament every Memorial Day weekend. The tournament attracts teams from Manhattan, southern California, Florida, and Puerto Rico.

== Presidents of the NYESL ==
- Joe Cruz (1985-1993)
- Robert Martinez (1993-1996)
- Pete Santiago (1997-2000)
- Steve Mercado (2000-2001)
- Eddie Rivera (2001-2002)
- Jennifer Lippold (2002-2004)
- Richie Marrero (2004-2006)
- Ervido Creales (2006-2016)
- Jennifer Lippold (2016 - present)
