= Governors Island Golf Course =

Former military golf course in New York, US

Coordinates: 40°41′28.89″N 74°0′57.63″W

- Interactive map of Governors Island Golf Course

Club information
- Location: Governors Island, New York
- Established: 1903
- Type: military
- Tota holes: 9
- Tournaments: Manhattan Golf Classic (2006)
- Designed by: Fred Roth
- Par: 30
- Length: 1,878 yards
- Course rating: 32.0
- Slope rating: 92

Governors Island Golf Course was a military course on Governors Island in New York Harbor, New York City, approximately 800 yards (732 m) from the southern tip of Manhattan Island. The golf course offered one of the most unusual golf experiences in New York City due to its views of the Brooklyn and Manhattan skylines, with the Statue of Liberty as a backdrop. It was considered the only golf course in Manhattan as Governors Island is technically part of the borough.

The golf course closed in 1996, but was re-opened for a one-time golf tournament in 2006.

== History ==
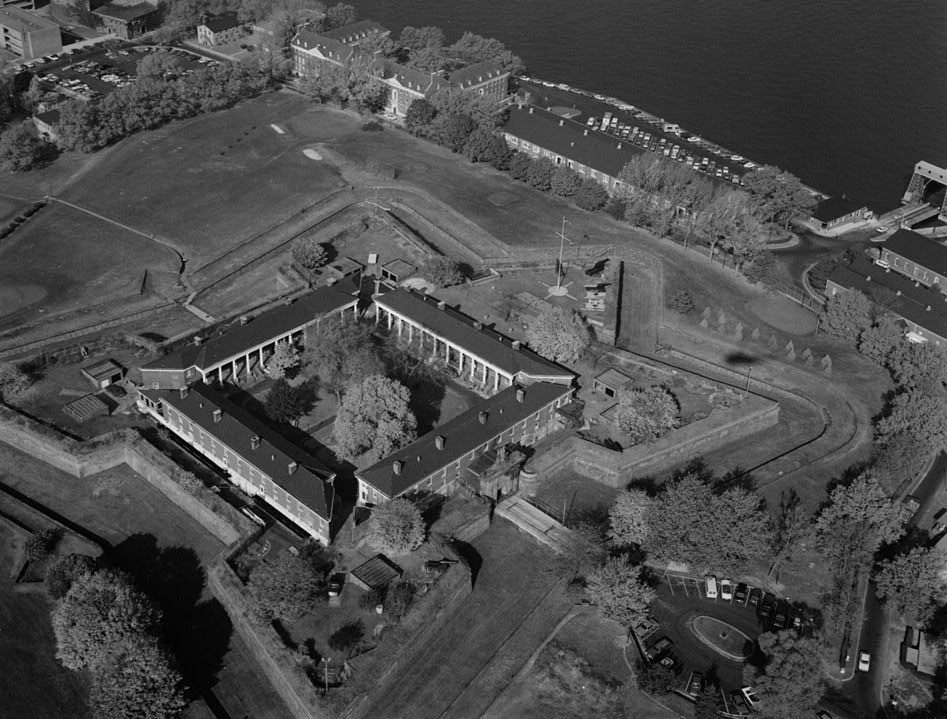
Fort Jay aerial view ~1982/1983.

Golf came to Governors Island in 1903, when a six-hole course, three holes played twice, was built near Fort Jay which was known as The Quadrangle. The golf course got a boost when Chief of Staff General Leonard Wood issued orders in 1910, that all officers must keep themselves fit. Golf was one of the sports noted by officers responding to the departmental order issued by Major General Frederick Dent Grant.

The version of the course that was in use for over 60 years dates back to the late 1920s when it was built with assistance from Plainfield Country Club greenskeeper Fred Roth on a piece of ground that was being utilized as a polo field. Polo was an important sport in the United States Army in the 1920s and a polo field was constructed on Fort Jay's glacis and the Parade Ground in the summer of 1925. The newly groomed open space presented an opportunity to update the golf course which was seeing increased play as Army personnel seemed to have more leisure time since troop levels had not been reduced to pre-1917 levels after World War I. Golf course features were improved with the construction of tee boxes, putting greens, and bunkers, and the polo players and the golfers began sharing the same space. The course measured 1,878 yd (1,717 m), played to a par of 30 for its nine holes, and was built on a plot of land that was just under 10-acres. Course routing was designed around Fort Jay, a star-shaped Revolutionary War vintage fortification which is on the National Register of Historic Places. The layout was sometimes called “the world’s crookedest” because it was shoe-horned into limited space with many twists and turns.

Soon the golf course was being used for tournament play and the public was invited to see the matches. In 1927 Gene Sarazen, Francis Ouimet, Walter Hagen, and Jess Sweetster played a fund raiser on the island for the Army Relief Society. After the completion of Liggett Hall in 1930, the polo field was moved to the open space south of the new barracks to address the conflict between golfers and polo players. In the 1940s, course maintenance was performed by inmates of a military prison on the island who were incarcerated during the Second World War for being absent without leave.

Jurisdiction of Governors Island passed from the United States Army to the United States Coast Guard in 1966. As part of a Fort Jay improvement project, the Coast Guard updated the golf course by planting trees to direct the line of play and protect buildings, and installed fencing to ensure golf balls stayed on the course. Governors Island Golf Course was in use until August 31, 1996 when the Coast Guard left the island.

In 2006 over $1 million was spent to temporarily restore six of the green complexes abandoned in 1996 for a charity event that also promoted the island's opportunities. Architect Robert McNeil was hired to build a multi-tee layout that when completed had a configuration that allowed only one foursome on the course at a time. The course re-used tees, greens, and fairways to route a crisscrossing 18 hole layout that even included a 490-yard par 5. The Manhattan Golf Classic was conducted from October 19 through 22 and consisted of various competitions and clinics that featured golf professionals Tom Watson, Annika Sorenstam, and Natalie Gulbis, as well as actors Craig T. Nelson, Dennis Quaid, William Shatner and Bruce McGill. Developer Donald Trump and golf teaching guru Hank Haney also participated. The event was billed as the "first ever professional golf tournament in the history of New York City", although Fresh Meadow Country Club, when it was in Queens had hosted two major championships in the 1930s, and Van Cortland Park Golf Course in The Bronx and the Fox Hills Golf Course on Staten Island had conducted professional events in the early 1900s. On October 22, 2006, a skins game between a foursome of Watson, Trump, Sorenstam, and Gulbis was televised from the 'composite' 18-hole course.

== Course description ==
Governors Island Golf Course occasionally had a set-up where one hole was played twice. In 1925, the New York Times published a story entitled “Fort Jay Golf Offers Weird Hazards: Governors Island Links a Fretful Maze of Moats, Windows, Canteens and Other Distracting Visions", that gave a description of the golf holes. The article said, the first hole played away from the Commanding General's house with a shot into the moat at Fort Jay. The second and third holes were played near Colonel's Row. The fourth hole bordered buildings marked as “canteens,” where players were advised to aim for the “A” in the word “CAFETERIA” and to hit their shots over the top of the building. The area between the sally port and the canteens was covered with wire netting to protect passersby. The fifth hole required a billiard shot: “hit the wall of the fort and let it carom over to the green.” The last holes led away from buildings.

In 1925, the “Ground Rules” of the Governors Island Golf Club included “A ball lodging within the fort is out of bounds,” and “The area within the cafeteria (canteen) buildings and the tennis court will be played as a water hazard.”
