= List of golf courses designed by Robert Trent Jones =

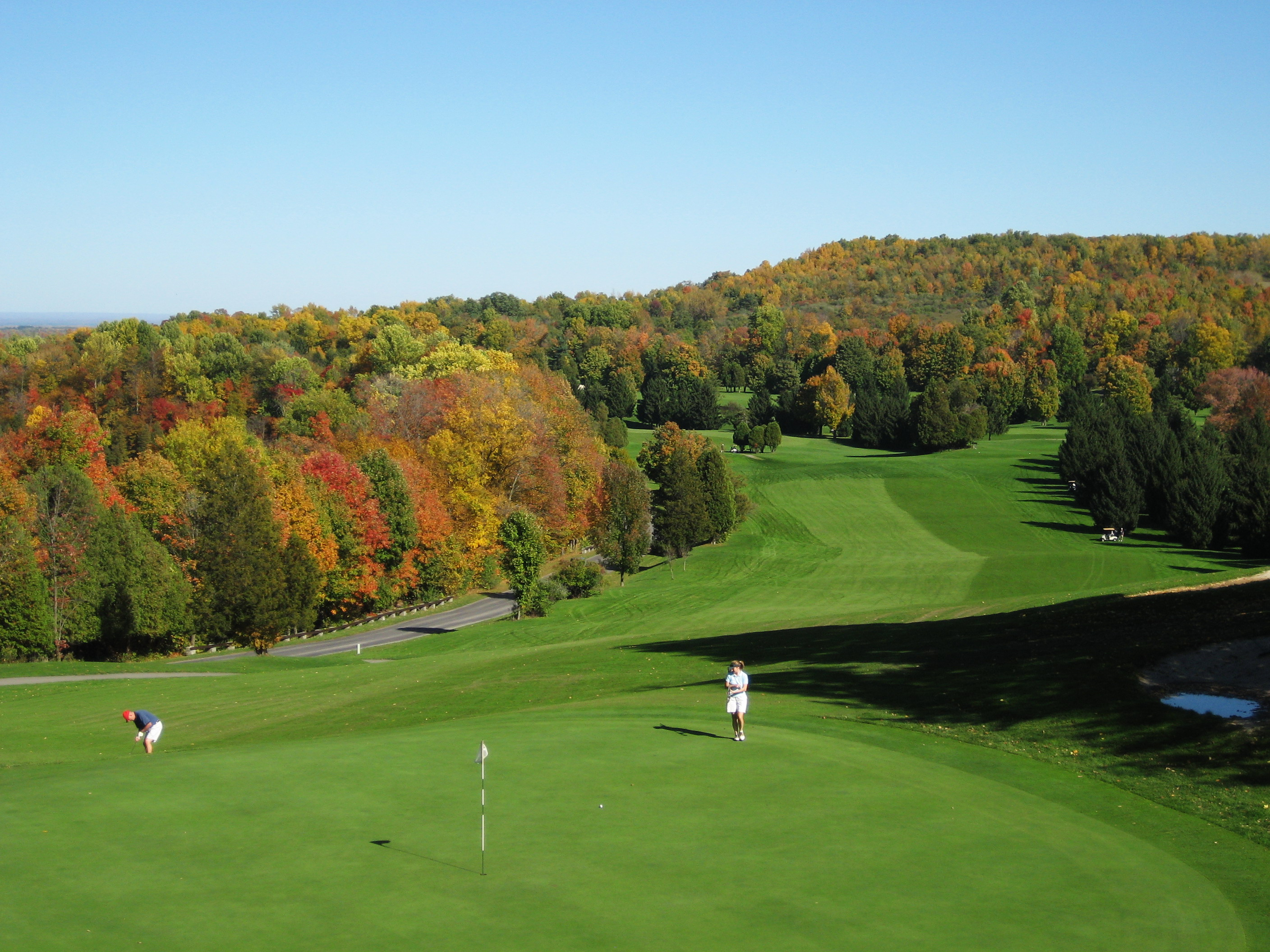
The golf course at Green Lakes State Park in New York, designed by Jones

This is a list of golf courses designed by Robert Trent Jones. Robert Trent Jones, Sr. (1906–2000) was an English–American golf course architect who designed or re-designed over 500 golf courses. Listed below is a non-exhaustive selection of golf courses that are original designs by Jones, as well as re-designs of existing courses. The year next to each denotes the year the course opened for play.

== List of courses ==
- Club El Rincón de Cajicá, Bogotá, Colombia, Colombia, 1963
- Duquesa Golf Club, Duquesa, Malaga, Spain
- El Caballero Country Club, Tarzana, Los Angeles, 1957
- Royal Golf club du Bercuit, Grez-Doiceau, 1965
- Valencia Country Club, Valencia, California, 1965

=== Original designs ===
- Adare Golf Club, Limerick, Ireland, 1995
- Alpine Bay Golf Club, Alpine Bay, AL, 1972
- Amsterdam Municipal Golf Course, Amsterdam, New York, 1938
- Augusta National Golf Club (11th and 16th holes), Augusta, Georgia, 1947, 1950
- Baltusrol Golf Club Lower Course, Springfield, New Jersey, 1952
- Bellerive Country Club, Town and Country, Missouri, 1960
- Birnam Wood Golf Club, Montecito, California, 1967
- Broadmoor Golf Club West Course (7th–14th holes), Colorado Springs, Colorado, 1964
- Cacapon Resort State Park, Berkeley Springs, West Virginia
- Carambola Beach Golf Course, St. Croix, 1967
- Centre Hills Country Club, State College, PA, 1965
- Clube de Golfe de Brasília, Brasília, Brazil, 1960
- Congressional Country Club Blue Course, Bethesda, Maryland, 1959, 1964
- Country Club of North Carolina Cardinal Course, Pinehurst, North Carolina, 1981
- Country Club of North Carolina Dogwood Course, Pinehurst, North Carolina, 1980
- Crag Burn Club, East Aurora, New York, 1971
- The Dunes Golf & Beach Club, Myrtle Beach, SC
- Durand Eastman Golf Club, Irondequoit, New York, 1933
- Eisenhower Lakes Golf Course, (Formerly Gordon Lakes) Fort Gordon Georgia 1976
- El Bosque Golf Club, Valencia, Spain, 1975
- Fairview Country Club, Greenwich, Connecticut, 1969
- Firestone Country Club North Course, Akron, Ohio, 1969
- Firestone Country Club South Course, Akron, Ohio, 1960
- Firestone-South, Akron, Ohio, 1969
- The Golf Course at Half Moon, Jamaica, W.I., 1962
- Golf de l'Estérel, Saint-Raphaël, France, 1989
- Golf de La Grande Motte (Les Flamants Roses), France, 1985
- The Greens at North Hills, Sherwood, Arkansas
- Greenville Country Club-Chanticleer Course, Greenville, SC, 1970
- Griffith E. Harris Golf Course, Greenwich, Connecticut, 1963
- Hancock Golf Course, Hancock NY, 1941
- Hazeltine National Golf Club, Chaska, Minnesota, 1962
- Hilldale Golf Club, Hoffman Estates, Illinois, 1972
- Hominy Hill Golf Course, Colts Neck, New Jersey, 1964
- Ipswich Country Club, Ipswich, Massachusetts 1988
- Kananaskis Country Golf Course, Kananaskis, Alberta, Canada 1983
- Las Brisas Golf Club, Marbella, Spain 1968
- The Legends Country Club, Eureka, MO
- Lido Golf Course, Lido Beach, New York 1949
- London Hunt & Country Club, London, Ontario, Canada 1960
- Luisita Golf and Country Club, Tarlac City, Philippines
- Lyman Meadow Golf Course, Middlefield, Connecticut 1969
- Madeline Island Golf Club, La Pointe, Wisconsin 1967
- Marshes Golf Club, Ottawa, Ontario, Canada
- Masterpiece at Treetops Resort, Gaylord, Michigan, 1987
- Metedeconk National Golf Club, Jackson, New Jersey, 1987
- MetroWest Golf Club, Orlando, Florida, 1987
- Midvale Country Club, Penfield, New York, 1931
- Mission Viejo Country Club, Mission Viejo, California, 1967
- Montauk Downs, Montauk, New York, 1968
- North Hills Country Club, Manhasset, New York, 1963
- Oak Hill-East, Rochester, New York, 1955, 1967
- Old Warson Country Club, St. Louis, Missouri, 1955
- Olympic Club Lake Course, San Francisco, California, 1954
- Panther Valley Country Club, Allamuchy, New Jersey
- The Patterson Club, Fairfield, CT, 1947
- Pauma Valley Country Club, Pauma Valley, CA, 1961
- Peachtree, 1949
- Point O'Woods Golf & Country Club, Benton Harbor, Michigan, 1958
- Port Royal Golf Course, Southampton, Bermuda, 1970
- Portsmouth Country Club, Portsmouth, NH, 1957
- Pottawatomie Golf Course, St Charles, IL, 1939
- Punta Borinquen Golf Club, Aguadilla, Puerto Rico, 1940
- Quinta da Marinha Golf Resorts, Cascais, Portugal, 1984
- The Rail Golf Course, Springfield, IL
- Rancocas Golf Club, Willingboro, New Jersey, 1966
- Raymond Memorial Golf Course Columbus, Ohio, 1969
- Real Club de Golf de Sotogrande, Cadiz, Spain, 1954
- Rivershore Estates & Golf Links, Kamloops, British Columbia, Canada
- Robert Trent Jones Golf Club, Gainesville, Virginia, 1991
- Robert Trent Jones Golf Course, Cornell University, Ithaca, New York 1940
- Robert Trent Jones Golf Trail, Alabama, 1992-2005
- Robert Trent Jones Oceanfront Course at Palmetto Dunes, Hilton Head Island, SC, 1967
- Royal Bercuit Golf Club, Grez-Doiceau, Belgium, 1967
- Seven Oaks Golf Course, Hamilton, NY, 1965
- Shady Oaks Country Club, Fort Worth, Texas, 1958
- Southern Highlands Golf Club, Las Vegas, Nevada, 1999
- Speidel Golf Club-Jones Course, Wheeling, WV
- The Springs Golf Course, The House on the Rock Resort, Spring Green, Wisconsin
- Spyglass Hill, Pebble Beach, California, 1966
- St George's Golf Course, St George's, Bermuda
- Sugarbush Resort Golf Club, Warren, Vermont, 1965
- Turtle Point Yacht and Country Club, Killen, Alabama. 1961
- The Tuxedo Club, Tuxedo Park, NY
- Valderrama Golf Club, Cadiz, Spain, 1974
- Valley View Golf Course, Utica, NY, 1939
- Vidauban Golf Club (Le Prince de Provence), France, 1999
- West Point Golf Course, West Point, New York, 1946
- The Wigwam Resort Gold Course, Litchfield Park, Arizona, 1965
- Yellowstone Country Club, Billings, MT, 1957/1958
