= Frederick H. Reimers =

American architect (1889–1961)

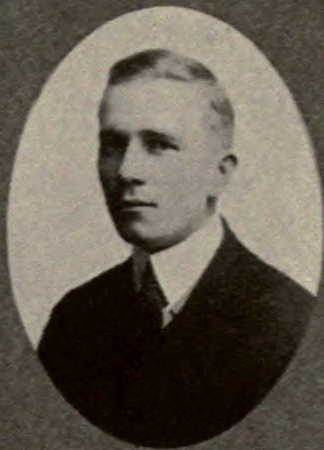
- Reimers in 1916
- Born: Frederick Holberg Reimers; June 1, 1889; Lakeport, California, US
- Died: July 11, 1961 (aged 72); Piedmont, California, US
- Education: University of California, Berkeley
- Occupation: Architect
- Known for: Period Revival-style architecture
- Awards
- Military career
- Branch: United States Army
- Service years: 1917–1919

Frederick H. Reimers (June 1, 1889 – July 11, 1961) was an American architect, known for his Period Revival-style architecture. His practice included projects, ranging from residences and public housing projects to WWII-era barracks and his commercial buildings. Two of his Art Deco buildings, the Income Securities Building (1928) in Oakland, California and the Howard Automobile Building (1930) in Berkeley, California are city landmarks.

== Early life ==
Reimers was born in Lakeport, California on June 1, 1889. He was the son of Johannes Reimers (1858-1953), a well-known landscape artist, and Merie R. Reimers. He studied architecture at the University of California, Berkeley graduating in 1915. He married Jane Howard in Alameda County on June 6, 1923. After their marriage they moved to Oakland, California. They later moved to Piedmont, California.

== Career ==
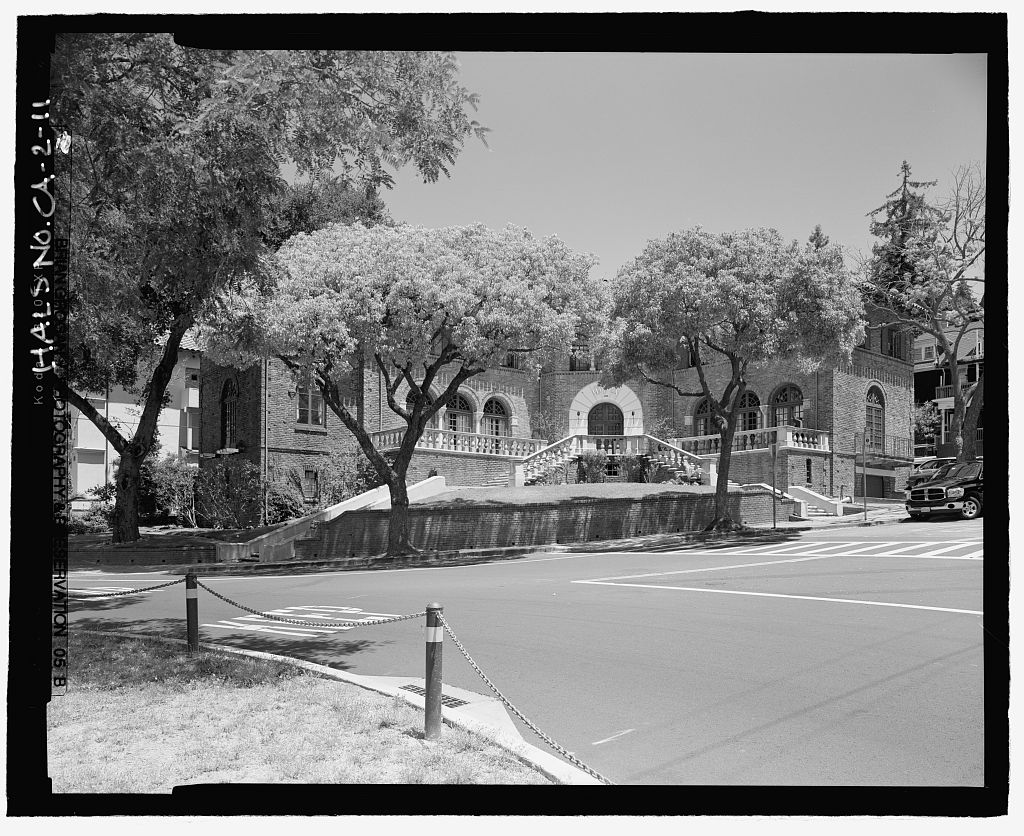
Sigma PI House in Piedmont designed by Reimers in 1928

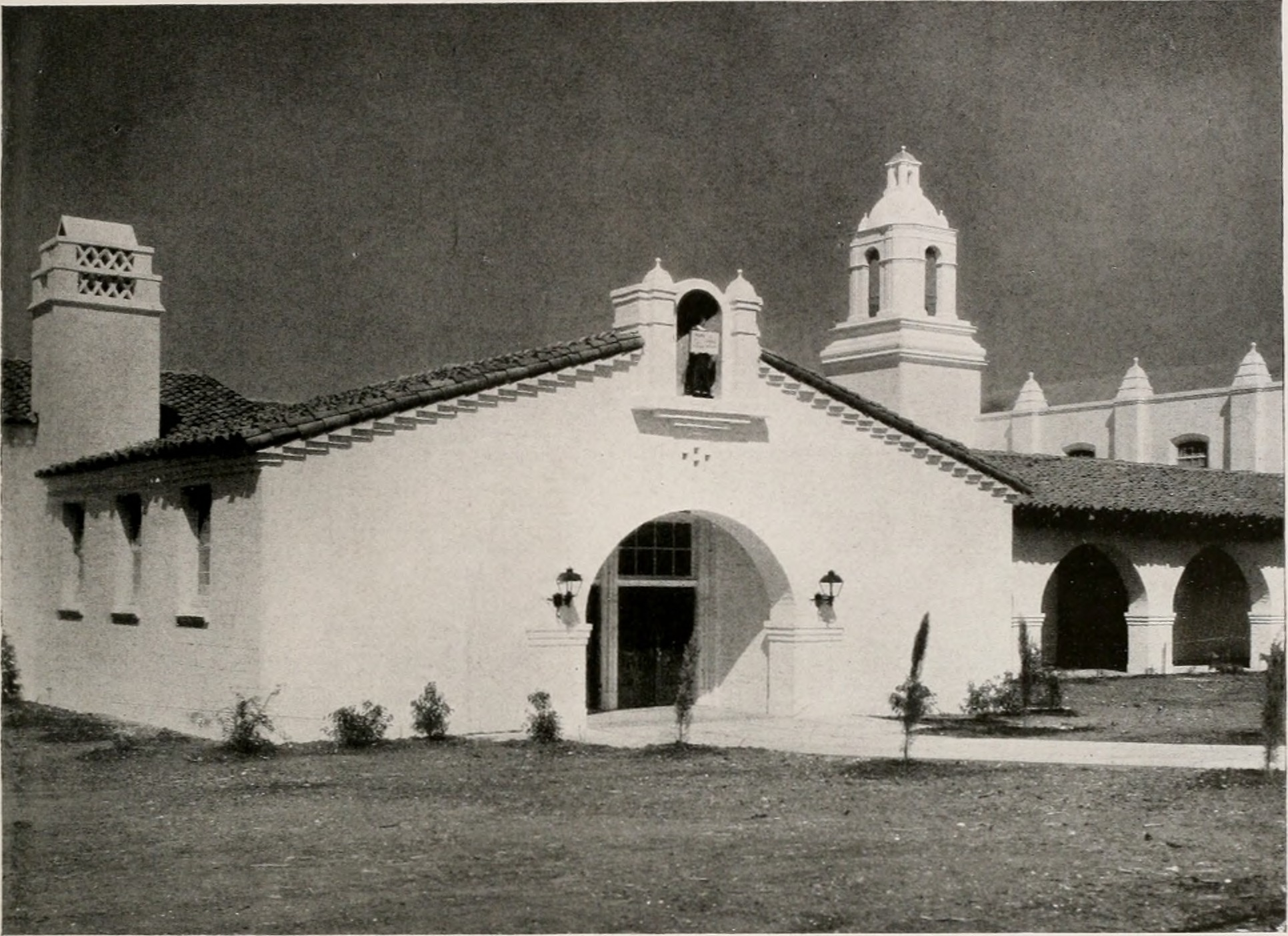
Mariano Guadalupe Vallejo High School designed by Reimers in 1933

Reimers began his career as a draftsman for architect Bernard Maybeck in 1915. During World War I he was in the Reserve Officers' Training Corps at the Presidio of San Francisco. He served from 1917 to 1919.

In 1925, Reimers established his office in the Tribune Tower in Oakland, later relocating to San Francisco. His practice included projects, ranging from residences and public housing projects to WWII-era barracks and commercial buildings. He was a member of the American Institute of Architects and of the St. Francis Yacht Club in San Francisco.

In 1925, Reimers built Read House, a two-story Spanish Eclectic Revival-style residence built for Edward G. Read, a foreman of Southern Pacific Company. He also designed a number of Spanish Revival-style homes for Lakeshore Highlands tract in Oakland.

In 1926, Reimers designed and built the Olvida Peñas residence located at 1061 Majella Road in Pebble Beach, California. The house is noted for its use of Mexican Vernacular architecture and adherence to the community planning structures of the Monterey Peninsula Country Club in Pebble Beach.

Some of Reimers other works include the twelve-story Georgian-style Franklin Building built in 1927, on 1624 Franklin Street. and the six-story Income Securities Building built in 1928, an Art Deco office building at 360–364 14th Street in Oakland, California. The Income Securities building is listed as a district contributor for the Downtown Oakland Historic District National Register of Historic Places registration form. The design of this building features four triangular buttresses with outlined sculptural eagles. Above the doors, three large bas-relief panel sculptures, done by John Stoll, are placed above the doors.

== Death ==
Reimers died on July 11, 1961, at his home in Piedmont, California.
