= Strantz =

Strantz is a German surname. Notable people with the surname include:

- Hermann von Strantz (1853–1936), Prussian military officer
- Louise Strantz (1823–1909), German composer, poet, and singer
- Mike Strantz (1955–2005), American golf course architect
