= Olvida Peñas =

- U.S. National Register of Historic Places
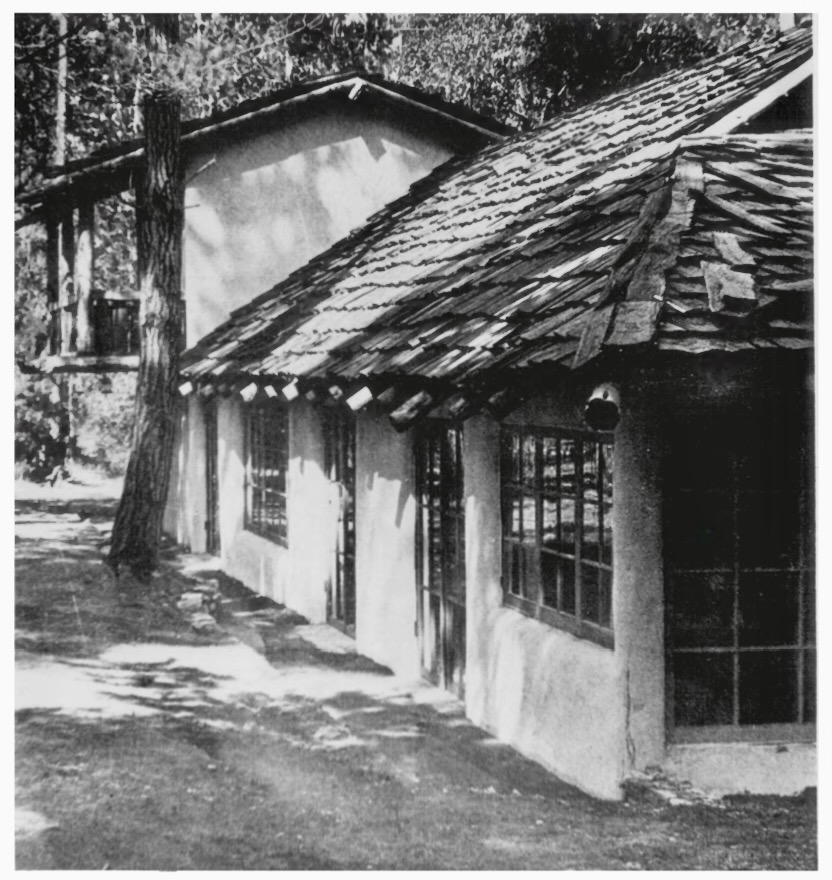
- Living wing at Olvida Peñas

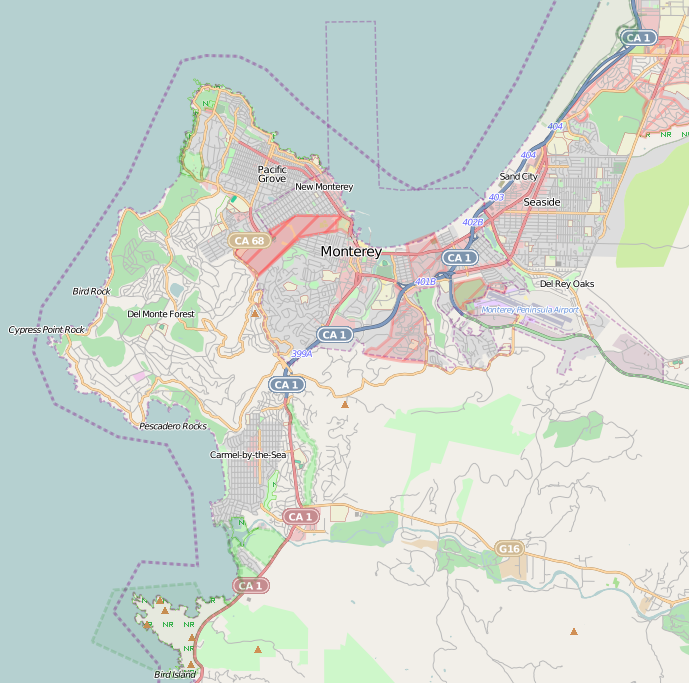
- Location within Monterey Peninsula
- Location: 1061 Majella Road, Pebble Beach, California
- Coordinates: 36°36′22″N 121°56′12″W
- Area: 1.6 acres (0.65 ha)
- Built: 1926; 100 years ago
- Architect: Frederick H. Reimers
- Architectural style: Vernacular architecture
- NRHP reference No.: 78000721
- Added to NRHP: April 3, 1978

Olvida Peñas is a residence built and designed by Oakland architect Frederick H. Reimers in 1926 for J. M. Mendel. The home is located in the Monterey Peninsula Country Club tract in Pebble Beach, California. The house is noted for its use of Mexican Vernacular architecture and adherence to the community planning structures of Pebble Beach. The building was officially listed on the National Register of Historic Places on April 3, 1978.

== History ==
Olvida Peñas, translating to "Forget Pain," stands on a plot of land covering approximately 1.6 acres (0.65 ha) over two lots inside Monterey Peninsula Country Club properties at Pebble Beach, California. Located approximately 1 mile (1.6 km) southwest of Monterey and 125 miles (201 km) to the south of San Francisco, the complex rests on level terrain within an open space in the Del Monte Forest. It is positioned near the intersection of Forest Lodge Road to the south and Majella Road to the west, next to The Links at Spanish Bay.

== Design ==
he two-story timbered home's design comprises four separate buildings with two parallel wings extending in the east-west direction, connected by a covered porch running north and southeast side of the compound. Together, the wings and porch shape an open square that encloses a courtyard. A wall for the western courtyard is constructed with adobe and mission tiles running along the western side of the complex. Both wings rest on concrete pads with Monterey pine framing. The roofs have basic gables featuring visible log trusses and a sub-roof made of redwood planks, capped with hand-split redwood shakes. The windows include a variety of plain glass windows and French doors. The exterior walls combine stucco and redwood board-and-batten. With the exception of the log supports and woodwork, the exterior is painted in a white hue.

A gate is situated on the south side of the property, facing Forest Lodge Road. It is a hand-sculpted wooden gate, framed by stone walls. The gate has ironwork featuring animal heads and Native American symbols. The southern wing of the complex features an Italian wrought iron doorway, which separates it from the primary living and dining space. A loft-style library spans one-third of the 60 ft (18 m)-long living room, creating a partial second-floor level to the west. The kitchen, breakfast area, one bedroom, a bath, and a recently added family room are in the eastern section of the wing. The northern wing, spanning two stories, houses four bedrooms, two on the upper level and two on the lower level, each equipped with its private bath and external entrance. The original garage, initially connected to the lowermost bedroom on the eastern side, has been changed into a sitting room. Carmel stone is used in the living quarters, as a separation between the posts in the entrance, the breakfast area, and the additional family room. This addition was completed in 1972 by then-owners James and Annette Schallerer. Located in the southeastern section of the living wing, the extension was incorporated into the structure. During the construction phase, a set of French doors and a stationary six-over-three clear-glazed window were taken from the wall of the living room and seamlessly integrated into the new addition. The living wing features two fireplaces. The first, situated in the living/dining room area, is a substantial construction made of large local granite stones, incorporating a fire brick box. Originally, this fireplace served as the sole source for heating all water in the house. The second fireplace, crafted from shaped concrete, is positioned in the family room addition.

Two extra buildings are situated behind and to the east of the primary residence. One is an uncovered shed, and the other, resembling a carriage house, serves as a garage. These buildings were constructed in 1927 by Leila B. Hedges and are of the same design of the entire complex. The open shed located to the rear of the main complex follows a Monterey pine post-and-beam construction, providing coverage on three sides. It serves as a sheltered space for storage. The garage, designed in board-and-batten construction, bears a resemblance to a stable. Its sliding doors, situated at the front and rear, are crafted from 4 inches (100 mm)-thick hand-split redwood. Featuring four automobile bays, the structure also includes two rooms and a bath designated for living quarters.

Interior walls throughout the structure consist of Cellatex-type material placed between the posts and the stucco outer wall. The exterior walls are constructed with single-wall board-and-batten, featuring pine post-and-beam framing. The exterior walls facing west and north in the bedroom wing are made of Cellotex and stucco. Doors throughout the entire complex are crafted from thick, hand-hewn redwood planks, available in various sizes and adorned with ornamental ironwork furniture. Ornamental tile and ironwork elements are incorporated on both the outside and inside. Ceramic tiles with a glazed finish and decorative plaques, varying in size and shape, are strategically placed throughout the complex, embedded into the cement floors, serving as embellishments above doorways, both inside and outside, and affixed to outside and inside walls. Ornamental ironwork is prevalent, appearing in gates of diverse sizes, window grates adorning the main entrance in the living wing, and taking on various forms indoors, from wall sconces to fireplace furniture. A terrace made of paver bricks links both wings, surrounding the courtyard in the open square. The broad roof overhangs create a sheltered walkway, providing protection during bad weather. Initially, a minimum of four Monterey pine trees situated on the premises were integrated into the design of the portico terrace, with the roof constructed around them to preserve these natural features.

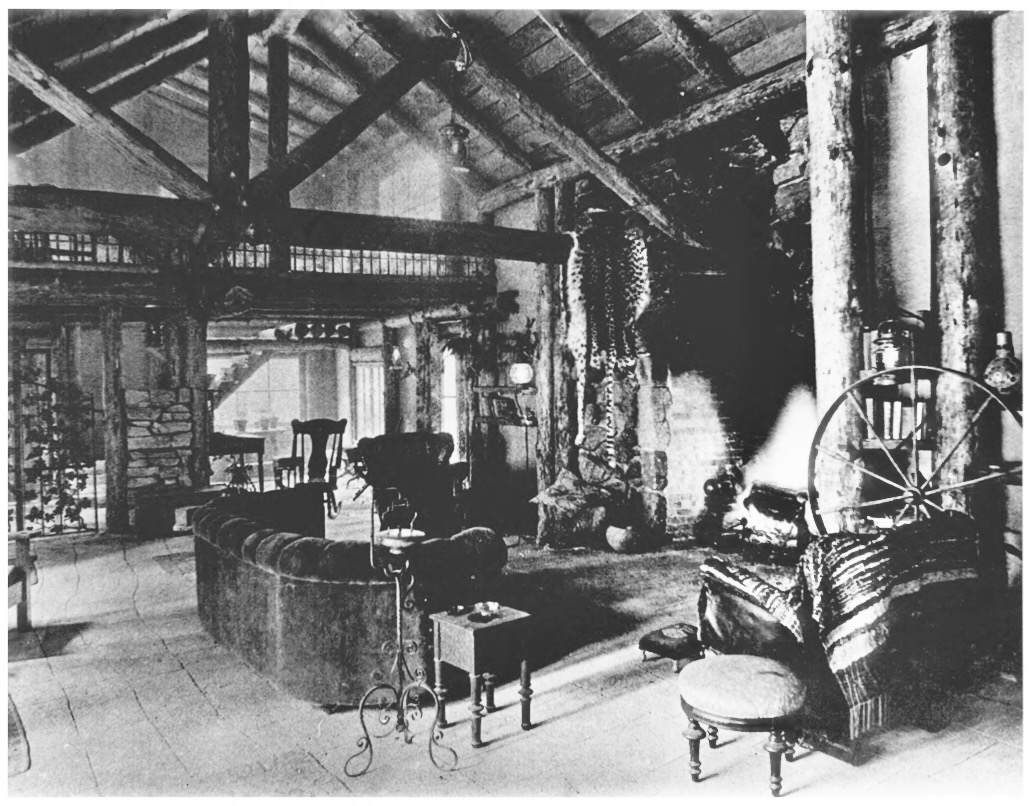
Living room

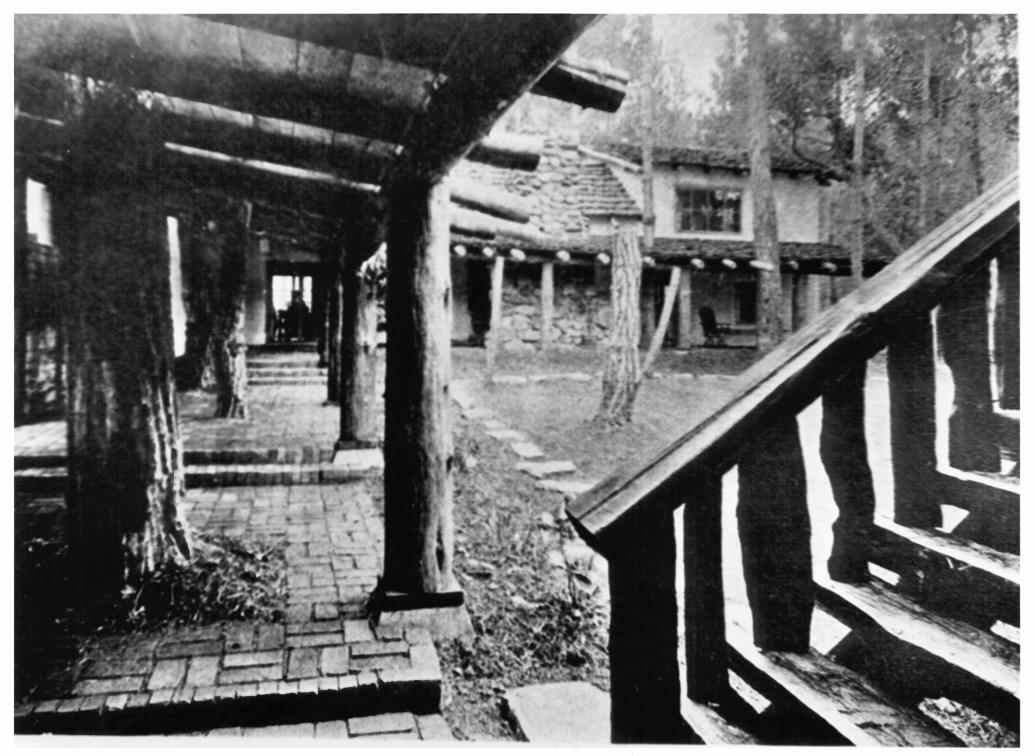
Patio and Porches

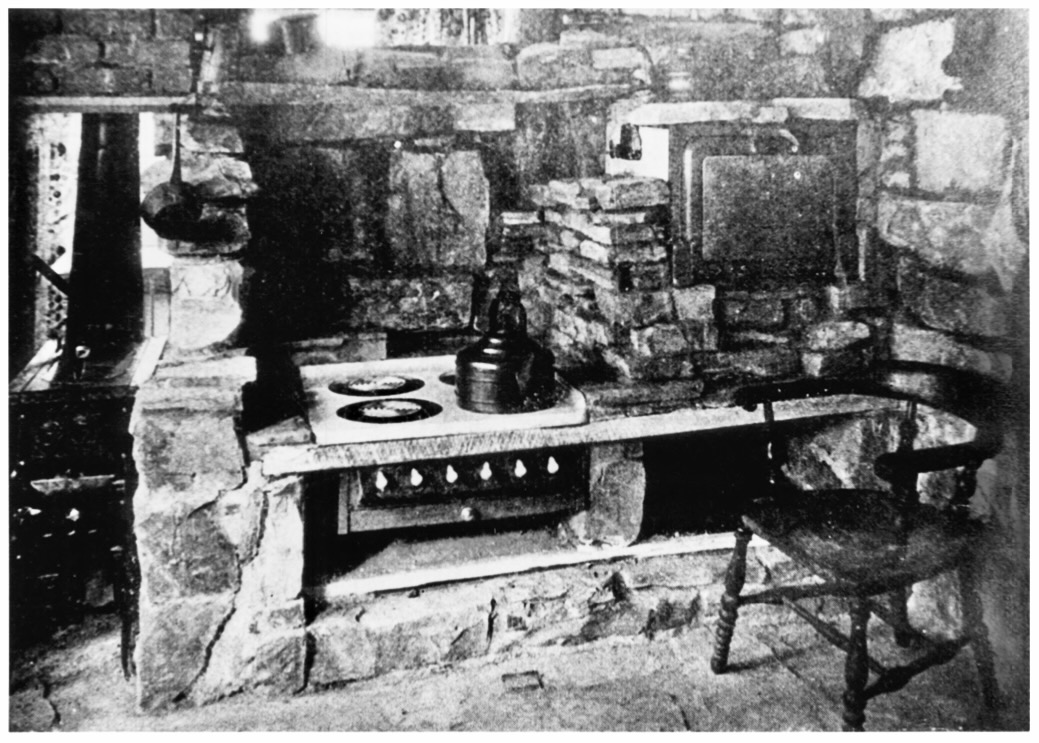
Kitchen

== Historical significance ==
Olvida Peñas was listed on the National Register of Historic Places on April 3, 1978.

== See also ==
- National Register of Historic Places listings in Monterey County, California
