= Retirement Systems of Alabama =

Alabama pension fund administrator

- Industry: Pension Fund
- Headquarters: Montgomery, Alabama, United States
- Key people: David G. Bronner (CEO)
- Website: www.rsa-al.gov

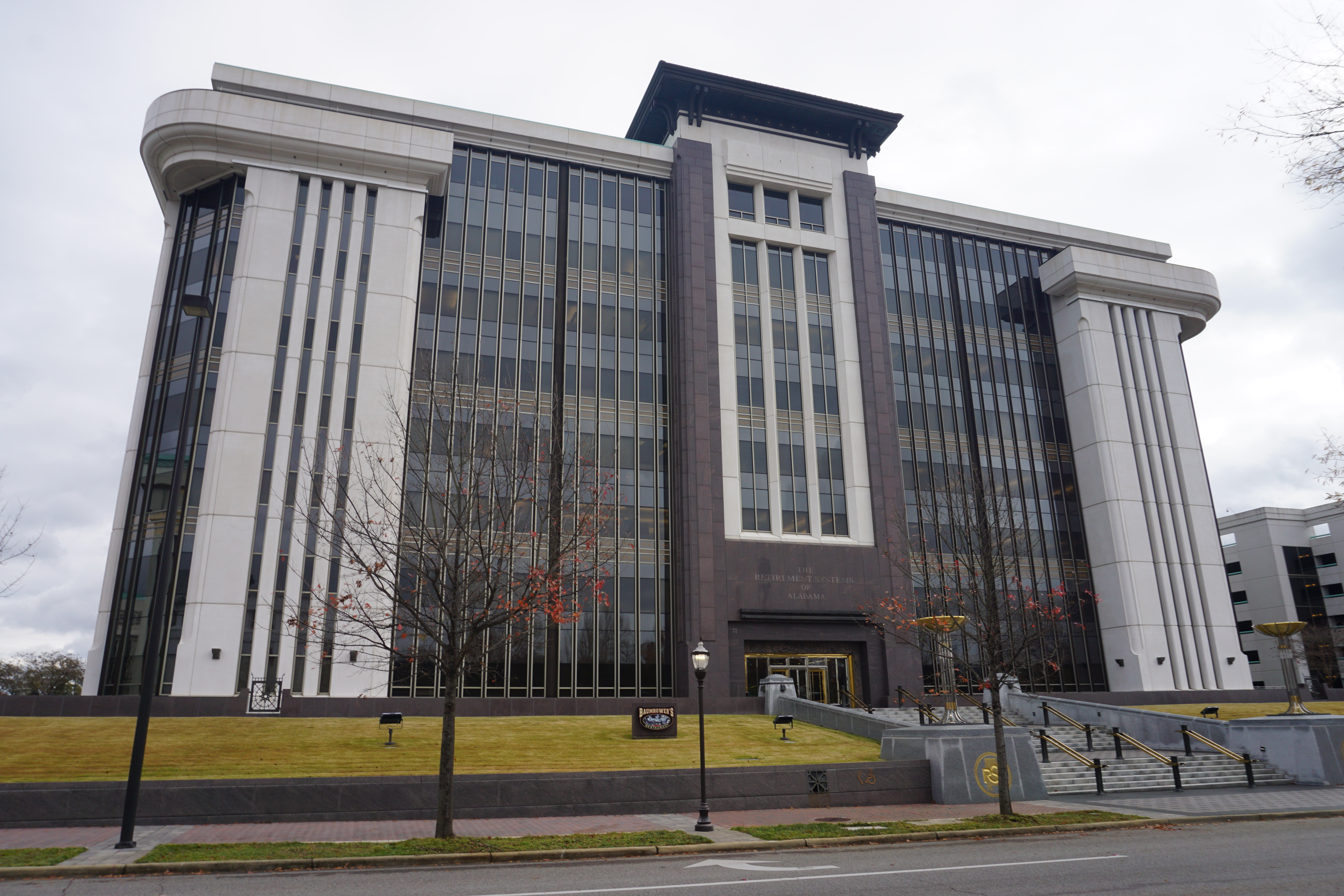
Retirement Systems of Alabama building in Montgomery, Alabama

Retirement Systems of Alabama is the administrator of the pension fund for employees of the state of Alabama. It is headquartered in the state capital Montgomery, Alabama. David G. Bronner is the chief executive officer.

Under Bronner's leadership, RSA has made a number of large real estate investments, some of them highly public. Its best known development is the Robert Trent Jones Golf Trail, a chain of eleven golf course complexes throughout the state. In 2019, RSA owned 26 golf courses. Since the beginning of the 21st century, RSA has been ranked among the 20 largest internally funded pension funds in the world.

== Notable investments ==
- Robert Trent Jones Golf Trail
- Community Newspaper Holdings (1997–)
- 55 Water Street, New York City (1993–)
- Raycom Media (1996–2019)
- The Grand Hotel, Point Clear, Alabama, U.S.
- RSA Battle House Tower, Mobile, Alabama, U.S. (2003–)
- RSA Dexter Avenue Building, Montgomery, Alabama, U.S. (2007–)
- RSA Tower, Montgomery, Alabama, U.S. (1996–)
- RSA Trustmark Building, Mobile, Alabama, U.S. (2009–)
- Renaissance Ross Bridge Golf Resort and Spa, Birmingham, Alabama, U.S.
- Renaissance Montgomery Hotel & Spa at the Convention Center, Montgomery, Alabama, U.S.
- Van Antwerp Building, Mobile, Alabama, U.S. (2013–)

== See also ==
- Public employee pension plans in the United States
