= Robert Trent Jones Golf Trail =

Set of golf courses in Alabama, USA

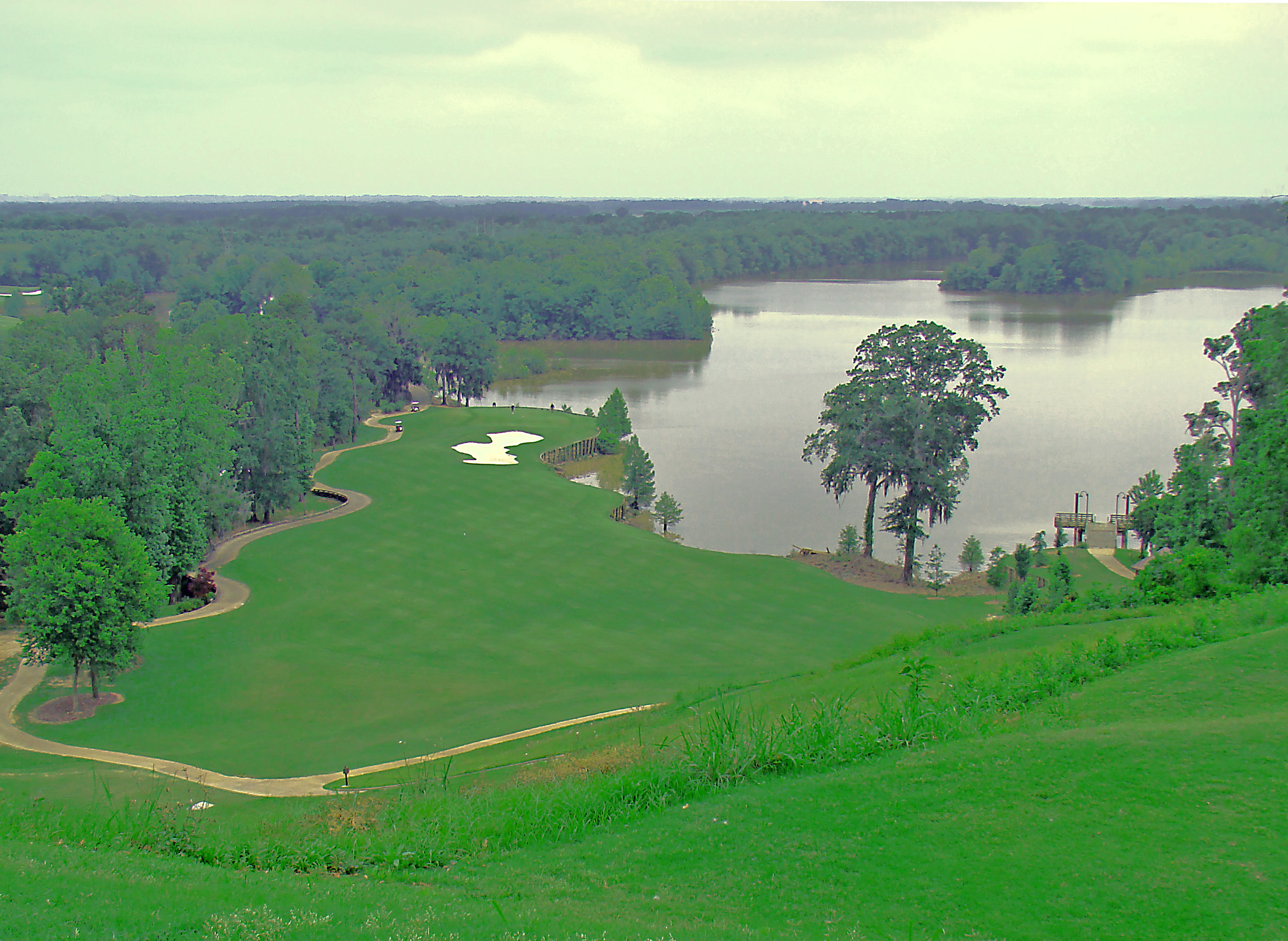
- RTJ Capitol Hill in Prattville

Club information
- Location: Alabama, United States
- Type: Public
- Owned by: Retirement Systems of Alabama
- Total holes: 468
- Website: rtjgolf.com
- Designed by: Robert Trent Jones, Sr.

The Robert Trent Jones Golf Trail is a collection of championship caliber golf courses, designed by Robert Trent Jones, Sr., distributed across the state of Alabama, as part of investments by the Retirement Systems of Alabama. The Trail started with 378 holes at eight sites throughout the state, but has grown to 468 holes at eleven sites.

== History ==
The concept was created and executed by David G. Bronner, CEO of the Retirement Systems of Alabama. The mission was to effectively diversify the assets of the state's pension fund and economically help the state of Alabama, the philosophy being that "the stronger the Retirement Systems of Alabama can make Alabama, the stronger the Retirement Systems will be."

The Trail started with 378 holes at eight sites throughout the state, but has grown to 468 holes at eleven sites.

== LPGA Tour ==
Two of the courses currently host events on the LPGA Tour: The Senator course at Capitol Hill near Montgomery, which hosts the Yokohama Tire LPGA Classic, and The Crossings course at Magnolia Grove near Mobile, home to the Airbus LPGA Classic.

== PGA Tour ==
The Grand National course in Opelika hosted the first PGA Tour event in Alabama since the 1990 PGA Championship, the 2015 Barbasol Championship.

== Courses and locations ==
Robert Trent Jones Golf Trail
- Cambrian Ridge (Greenville)
  - Canyon (9 holes)
  - Sherling (9 holes)
  - Loblolly (9 holes)
  - Short Course (9 holes)
  Played as Canyon/Loblolly, Loblolly/Sherling, or Sherling/Canyon.
- Capitol Hill (Prattville/Montgomery)
  - Judge
  - Legislator
  - Senator
- Grand National (Auburn/Opelika)
  - Lake
  - Links
  - Short Course
- Hampton Cove (Huntsville)
  - Highlands
  - River
  - Short Course
- Highland Oaks (Dothan)
  - Highlands (9 holes)
  - Marshwood (9 holes)
  - Magnolia (9 holes)
  - Short Course (9 holes)
  Played as Highlands/Marshwood, Magnolia/Highlands, or Marshwood/Magnolia.
- Lakewood Golf Club (Point Clear)
  - Azalea
  - Dogwood
- Magnolia Grove (Mobile)
  - Crossings
  - Falls
  - Short Course
- Oxmoor Valley (Birmingham)
  - Ridge
  - Valley
  - The Backyard (9 holes)
- Ross Bridge (Hoover/Birmingham)
- Silver Lakes (Gadsden/Anniston)
  - Backbreaker (9 holes)
  - Heartbreaker (9 holes)
  - Mindbreaker (9 holes)
  - Short Course (9 holes)
  Played as Backbreaker/Mindbreaker, Heartbreaker/Backbreaker, or Mindbreaker/Heartbreaker.
- The Shoals (Muscle Shoals/Florence)
  - Fighting Joe
  - Schoolmaster

== Scorecards ==
Scorecards for courses played on the PGA and LPGA Tours.

Senator Course at Capitol Hill
Tee	Rating/Slope	1	2	3	4	5	6	7	8	9	Out	10	11	12	13	14	15	16	17	18	In	Total
Par		4	3	4	4	5	4	3	5	4	36	5	4	4	3	4	4	3	5	4	36	72
Black	77.4/132	427	230	419	426	611	420	231	558	437	3,759	616	435	496	203	459	448	222	559	457	3,895	7,654
Purple	74.1/125	395	204	385	390	563	385	195	530	402	3,449	543	400	434	169	426	416	181	515	408	3,492	6,941
Orange	70.9/126	365	165	364	363	539	349	167	496	376	3,184	528	370	400	154	394	389	147	475	369	3,226	6,410
White	M: 68.1/121 L: 73.6/123	329	139	322	339	500	326	129	453	343	2,880	484	358	374	138	358	334	115	456	334	2,951	5,831
Teal	M:64.7/110 L: 69.6/116	281	121	290	282	442	301	110	393	290	2,510	460	317	326	116	333	307	84	376	308	2,627	5,137
SI		11	17	13	5	1	7	15	3	9		4	14	6	18	12	8	16	2	10

Lake Course at Grand National
Tee	Rating/Slope	1	2	3	4	5	6	7	8	9	Out	10	11	12	13	14	15	16	17	18	In	Total
Par		4	4	3	5	4	4	5	3	4	36	4	4	5	4	5	3	4	3	4	36	72
Purple	74.3/136	390	428	197	527	431	455	557	213	430	3,628	434	445	522	470	545	230	334	205	476	3,661	7,289
Orange	71.3/126	364	381	178	480	396	381	521	182	379	3,262	397	387	493	388	510	182	297	174	398	3,226	6,488
White	M: 68.7/117 L: 74.4/133	319	361	168	447	385	352	477	148	339	2,986	353	356	459	361	488	160	285	143	357	2,962	5,948
Teal	M: 68.7/117 L: 68.0/119	285	308	92	399	308	295	418	103	276	2,484	276	239	391	343	384	93	247	126	327	2,426	4,910
SI		11	1	15	9	5	13	3	17	7		4	16	12	2	8	6	14	18	10

Crossings Course at Magnolia Grove
Tee	Rating/Slope	1	2	3	4	5	6	7	8	9	Out	10	11	12	13	14	15	16	17	18	In	Total
Par		4	3	4	5	4	5	4	3	4	36	4	4	4	5	3	4	5	3	4	36	72
Purple	73.6/125	422	185	385	540	430	528	412	219	406	3,527	417	398	421	559	195	423	596	226	450	3,685	7,212
Orange	70.8/123	387	168	347	511	392	500	385	192	381	3,263	386	364	392	524	172	400	535	201	415	3,389	6,652
White	68.6/114	342	135	317	496	378	484	369	163	349	3,033	374	334	371	508	157	354	476	168	382	3,124	6,157
Teal	67.8/113	275	101	279	478	331	425	314	122	316	2,641	348	273	285	430	99	282	425	134	344	2,620	5,261
SI		14	18	10	6	2	12	16	8	4		7	11	17	5	15	3	9	13	1
