= Sodus Bay Heights Golf Club =

- Location in the United States
- 43°15′14.2″N 76°59′17.9″W

Club information
- Location: Sodus Point, New York
- Established: 1924
- Type: Semi-Private
- Tota holes: 18
- Website: sodusbayheights.com
- Par: 72
- Length: 6,672 yards (6,101 m)
- Course rating: 73.1
- Slope rating: 139

Sodus Bay Heights Golf Club, located in Sodus Point, New York, is a 150-acre (.60 km^{2}) 18-hole golf course, overlooking Sodus Bay, the largest bay on Lake Ontario. Founded in 1924, the course plays 6,682 yards from the championship tees, 6,316 from the men's tees, and 5,470 from the ladies. The club started out as a 9-hole course, consisting of a club house, a separate pro shop, and a small caddy building. Before being turned into a golf club, the land was known as the Blackmar Farm, owned by Countess VerHemert of Paris, France. After her death, the buyers had grandiose plans for the property, and wanted to turn it into a recreation and housing tract. The original plans were to include a natural amphitheater, similar to the Hollywood Bowl, at the bottom of the knoll on the property, with a golf course running clockwise around it. Additional plans included a playground for the children and a tennis court. The golf course materialized first, and the tennis courts were added at a later date. The architect of the original 9-hole course is unknown, and rumors that famous golf architect Robert Trent Jones Sr. was the architect are incorrect. However, Robert Trent Jones was the first head golf professional at Sodus Bay Heights from 1930 to 1935, which has led to the confusion on his involvement with the course architecture.

In 1966, member Claude Wright, along with Head Golf Professional Lee Boice and Superintendent Warner Featherly, formed a committee to start planning an extension of 9 holes to make it a full 18-hole course. Geoffrey S. Cornish, a golf course architect from Amherst, Massachusetts, was given a contract to redesign the existing course, and to expand it another 9 holes. On Sunday, May 25, 1969, the new course was dedicated, and a commemorative stone was placed by the club flagpole. A number of golf pros were invited to play that rainy day. They were accompanied by two playing members, and were driven around by female club members.

== Robert Trent Jones Sr. and Jr. Legacy ==
Robert Trent Jones Sr. moved to the United States of America with his family at the age of 5, and they settled into East Rochester, New York. In his teens, Jones became an avid golfer, and ended up being the first Head Golf Professional at Sodus Bay Heights Golf Club. After heading the position for 5 years, Jones left to enroll in Cornell University, with the sponsorship of the club president, James D. Bashford. Though Jones did not graduate, since he did not meet the entrance requirements, the university allowed him to design his own course of study, essentially creating the world's first golf course architecture degree. In the spring of 2014, The Heights restaurant dining room, at Sodus Bay Heights Golf Club, was renamed in his honor, now officially called the Robert Trent Jones Sr. Grill and Tap Room.

In May 2014, Robert Trent Jones Jr. was invited to be a guest for the dedication of the newly minted Robert Trent Jones Sr. Grill and Tap room, and was scheduled to participate in the yearly Reserve Cup tournament being held that weekend. The tournament ended up being cancelled due to rainy weather, and Jones Jr. was unable to play the course. However, Mr. Jones was given a tour of the course and when he reached the 9th green, he dropped a ball, hit a putt, and said "this isn't fair, it's too severe." He asked how the members felt about it, and after hearing that the members were not a fan of the green, said "I'd be willing to redesign this in my father's name as a gesture of his legacy at no cost." Within an hour, Mr. Jones had sketched out a new design for the 9th green. Mr. Jones returned one year later, on May 16 for the 2015 Reserve Cup tournament that was present for the dedication of the "New 9th Green", and hit the first three ceremonial putts. About Mr. Jones Jr, Mr. David B. Jones, the head golf professional at Sodus Bay (no relation), stated:

"To have one of the leading golf course architects historically speaking, not just of recent times.... to relish his history, his family tradition here and be willing to come to Sodus Point, New York not only to design the green, but to come open the green--two separate trips. It shows how important this is to him."

== Head professionals ==
Throughout the history of the 100+ year old club, there has been 10 different head professionals.

Head professional	Starting year	Final year	Total
Robert Trent Jones Sr.	1930	1935	5
Scoop Haubner	1936	1939	4
Douglas Cousins	1940	1942	3
(No professional - WWII)	1943	1946	(4)
Douglas Cousins	1947	1947	1
Byron Proesus	1948	1948	1
Douglas Cousins	1949	1951	3
Lee Boice	1952	1977	25
Dennis Mead	1978	1979	2
Paul M. Carter	1980	2006	26
David B. Jones	2007	2016	9
Benjamin Wilson	2016	2020	4
Andrew Smith	2020	Current	4
