= Metedeconk National Golf Club =

Private golf course in New Jersey, U.S.

- Interactive map of Metedeconk National Golf Club
- 40.166°N 74.337°W

Club information
- Location: Jackson, New Jersey, U.S.
- Established: 1987
- Type: Private
- Owner: Metedeconk National Golf Club Membership
- Tota holes: 27
- Tournaments: 2003 Met Open
- Website: www.metedeconk.org
- Designed by: Robert Trent Jones
- Par: 72
- Length: 5,200 to 7,200 yd (4,800 to 6,600 m)
- Course rating: 76.4

Metedeconk National Golf Club, known colloquially as The Conk, is a private, 27-hole golf course located in Jackson, New Jersey off of I-195. The club is named after the Metedeconk River, the south branch of which runs through the property. Metedeconk National has hosted the Metropolitan Open, the New Jersey Open, and various state and NJPGA sectional events.

== History ==
Initially scheduled to be developed as a trailer park, local contractor and owner of the 1,200-acre property Richard "Dick" Sambol, with the help of his son, decided on utilizing a portion of the land for a golf course. Famed course architect Robert Trent Jones was hired to design the grounds.

Though the original plans slated for the course to be an amenity rather than the main attraction, as the project moved forward, and at the behest of Jones, the idea of a housing development was scrapped in favor of fully devoting efforts to the course and club.

== Membership and facilities ==
Being a private club, day-to-day access is only allowed to members and up to seven of their guests. As of 2017, membership fees were around $20,000 for the year, though this amount doesn't include an initial buy-in (upwards of $150,000+). Membership is for one person, though children (under 24) of members are not charged for entry. Membership is by invitation only, and prospective new members must have a recommendation from current member in good standing before being approved for invite by the board.

=== Course ===
Similar to other Jones designs, Metedeconk National features multiple tee boxes at each hole. This opens the course to players of varying skill levels and also allows for a faster or slower play. The front and back nine were part of the original 18-hole course, with the new nine (19th-27th holes) unveiled in 1998. Water serves as a playing hazard on seven holes. The course carries four sets of tees ranging from 5,200 to 7,200 yards.

Front/Back Tee Details
| Tee | Par | Length (yds) | Rating | Slope |
|---|---|---|---|---|
| Medal | 72 | 6,892 | 73.9 | 142 |
| Member | 72 | 6,542 | 73 | 139 |
| Middle | 72 | 6,239 | 71.2 | 135 |
| Forward | 72 | 5,294 | 72.2 | 125 |

Hole Details
| Hole | Par | Handicap | Distance from tee box (furthest - nearest) |
|---|---|---|---|
| 1 | 4 | 5/4 | 405 - 316 |
| 2 | 3 | 8/9 | 205 - 124 |
| 3 | 5 | 1/2 | 560 - 467 |
| 4 | 4 | 3/4 | 441 - 288 |
| 5 | 5 | 7/3 | 525 - 416 |
| 6 | 3 | 9/8 | 164 - 124 |
| 7 | 4 | 6 | 386 - 304 |
| 8 | 4 | 4/5 | 412 - 318 |
| 9 | 4 | 2/1 | 410 - 316 |
| 10 | 5 | 4/2 | 551 - 469 |
| 11 | 4 | 3/6 | 423 - 301 |
| 12 | 3 | 8/4 | 190 - 139 |
| 13 | 4 | 6/7 | 378 - 281 |
| 14 | 4 | 7/5 | 370 - 268 |
| 15 | 5 | 1 | 543 - 456 |
| 16 | 4 | 5/8 | 350 - 223 |
| 17 | 3 | 9 | 182 - 134 |
| 18 | 4 | 2/3 | 425 - 350 |
| 19 | 4 | 5/7 | 375 - 329 |
| 20 | 4 | 6 | 400 - 339 |
| 21 | 5 | 3 | 540 - 467 |
| 22 | 4 | 1/5 | 407 - 320 |
| 23 | 3 | 8 | 169 - 91 |
| 24 | 5 | 7/4 | 502 - 435 |
| 25 | 3 | 9 | 167 - 92 |
| 26 | 4 | 4/2 | 415 - 339 |
| 27 | 4 | 2/1 | 419 - 341 |

Beginning in 2018, the club contracted with Michigan-based course designer Raymond Hearn for a 3-year project that would include course restorations and bunker enhancements. Renovations were completed in May 2022.

=== Practice facilities ===
The club has devoted 50 acres of property to practice facilities and short-game areas. The site includes a pair of tees and fairways, as well as six target greens, a 10,000 square-foot putting green, several bunkers, uneven lies, and a teaching center.

=== Cottages ===
Overnight accommodations are available onsite for members and their guests: The Lodge and The Cedar House. Two different "cottages" each provide eight bedrooms, seven to eight bathrooms, a private putting green, and views of the course. Lodging services are only available if booked through or by a club member.
