= Poppy Hills Golf Course =

Golf course in Pebble Beach, California

Coordinates: 36.582368°N 121.938398°W

- Interactive map of Poppy Hills Golf Course

Club information
- Location: Pebble Beach, California; United States
- Established: 1986; Renovated 2014
- Owner: Northern California Golf Association
- Operator: Northern California Golf Association
- Total holes: 18
- Tournaments: AT&T Pebble Beach National Pro-Am (1991–2009); Nature Valley First Tee Open (2014–16)
- Website: poppyhillsgolf.com
- Designed by: Robert Trent Jones, Jr.
- Par: 71
- Length: 7,002 yards
- Course rating: 73.5
- Slope rating: 135
- Course record: Matt Gogel, 62

Poppy Hills Golf Course is the newest golf course in Pebble Beach, California, after undergoing an extensive 13-month renovation that was completed in April 2014. The original Poppy Hills was designed by Robert Trent Jones, Jr., and opened in 1986. Along with Pebble Beach Golf Links and Spyglass Hill Golf Course, Poppy Hills co-hosted the PGA Tour's AT&T Pebble Beach National Pro-Am from 1991 to 2009, replacing Cypress Point in the rotation. Poppy Hills co-hosted the Champions Tour's Nature Valley First Tee Open with Pebble Beach for three years, beginning in September 2014. Poppy Hills has also hosted 1 USGA event, the 2018 U.S. Girls’ Junior.

== AT&T Pebble Beach National Pro-Am ==
Poppy Hills replaced Cypress Point Club as one of the host courses of the AT&T Pebble Beach National Pro-Am in 1991. The switch occurred after the private club did not immediately admit an African-American member, despite the request of the Tour. Poppy Hills last hosted the AT&T National Pro-Am in 2009. The AT&T moved to Monterey Peninsula Country Club's Shore Course in 2010. Matt Gogel set the Poppy Hills course record with a 10-under 62 during the 2001 AT&T.

== Reception ==
The new Poppy Hills has been widely heralded since it reopened in 2014. Golf.com Travel Writer Joe Passov said the new Poppy Hills has a "Pinehurst-like touch, with just a hint of near-neighbor Cypress Point." Golf Getaways Travel Writer Vic Williams added about the new design, "at certain times it feels like Pinehurst, other times like Augusta, with dashes of Pine Valley."
