= Panther Valley Country Club =

Private golf course in New Jersey, U.S.

Panther Valley Golf & Country Club
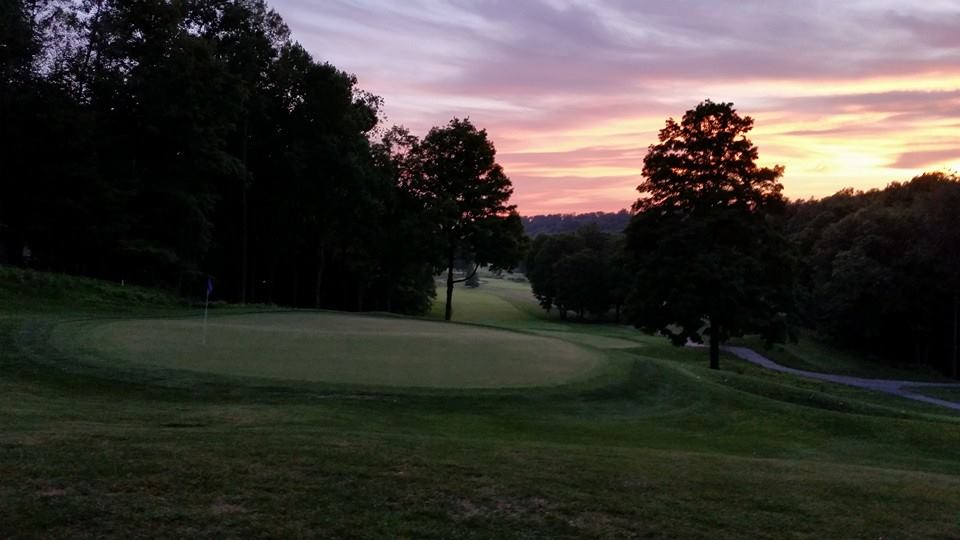
- 12th putting green at dusk

- Location within New Jersey
- 40.9082°N 74.8308°W

Club information
- Location: 1 Forest Rd Allamuchy Twp, Warren County, New Jersey
- Established: 1969
- Type: Private
- Tota holes: 18
- Greens: Bent
- Fairways: Bent
- Website: https://panthervalleygolf.com/
- Designed by: Robert Trent Jones
- Par: 71
- Length: 5,469–6,827
- Course rating: 73.4
- Slope rating: 141

Panther Valley Golf & Country Club (PVGCC) is a private golf course and country club located in Allamuchy Township, in Warren County, New Jersey, just south of Interstate 80 and the Pequest River.

The course was designed by architect Robert Trent Jones Sr., and first opened for play in 1969.

== History ==
Panther Valley, originally known as Panther Ledge Farm, was carved out of a 4,000 cattle farm belonging to Clendenin J. Ryan Jr., grandson of Thomas Fortune Ryan, a New York City financier who was recorded as the last of the robber barons of Wall Street.

Advertising executive Robert Conahay III purchased the ranch following Ryan's death in 1957 and began parsing it out to developers in the years following.

In 1967, Robert Trent Jones was contracted to design an 18-hole, championship-quality golf course. After many meetings to review plans, construction was started in 1968 on the 1,500-acre course. The front nine holes were opened in the Spring of 1969, and by October the full eighteen holes were ready for play. The largest pool and cabana in the country club section was completed in 1970.

Local legend claims the name comes from the last panther in New Jersey meeting its end in a thicket overlooking what is now the fifth hole.

== Membership and facilities ==
As the name suggests, PVGCC has both an 18-hole golf course, as well as a 25,000 sq ft (2,300 m^{2}) on-site country clubhouse, with pools, lit tennis courts, dining areas, and a full bar.

In addition, the club offers a practice facility consisting of a driving range and putting greens, locker rooms, and an in-person and online pro-shop.

Prospective attendees must either be or be guests of members. The facility offers over eight membership packages, including those for youth and junior golfers, weekend-only players, and those just wishing to join for the pools or dining.

=== Course ===
The longest hole on the course is the 7th—a par-5 that plays to 550 yards from the back tee; the shortest is the 13th—a par-3 that plays to 197 yards from the back. Additionally, water hazards come into play on at least 13 separate areas. As with a number of Jones' course designs, PVGCC offers multiple tee boxes at each hole, allowing players of varying skill levels to participate and choose a faster or slower pace of play.

Tee details
TEE	PAR	LENGTH (yds)	RATING	SLOPE
Black	71	6,827	73.4	141
Blue	71	6,365	71	138
White	71	6,024	69.5	133
Red	71	5,469	72.9	135

Hole details
Front 9	Par	Black	Blue	White	Red
Hole 1	5	522	510	488	452
Hole 2	3	199	169	153	121
Hole 3	4	425	388	378	349
Hole 4	4	381	360	345	303
Hole 5	4	456	431	398	381
Hole 6	3	209	162	151	127
Hole 7	5	550	523	502	471
Hole 8	4	439	411	391	365
Hole 9	4	445	418	389	370
OUT	36	3,626	3,372	3,195	2,939

Hole details
Back 9	Par	Black	Blue	White	Red
Hole 10	3	210	174	161	118
Hole 11	5	521	501	482	450
Hole 12	4	347	337	314	283
Hole 13	3	197	184	160	133
Hole 14	4	370	348	330	283
Hole 15	4	384	361	344	327
Hole 16	4	372	353	337	310
Hole 17	4	413	355	341	297
Hole 18	4	387	380	360	329
IN	35	3,201	2,993	2,829	2,530
