= AT&T Pebble Beach Pro-Am =

Golf tournament in Pebble Beach, California, United States

Coordinates: 36.568°N 121.950°W

Tournament information
- Location: Pebble Beach, California
- Established: 1937
- Courses: Pebble Beach Golf Links; Spyglass Hill Golf Course
- Par: 72 (PB); 72 (SH)
- Length: 6,816 yards (6,233 m) (PB); 7,035 yards (6,433 m) (SH)
- Organized by: Monterey Peninsula Foundation
- Tour: PGA Tour
- Format: Stroke play
- Prize fund: $20,000,000
- Month played: February
- Website: attpbgolf.com

Tournament record score
- Aggregate: 265 Brandt Snedeker (2015)
- To par: −22 Brandt Snedeker (2015) −22 Collin Morikawa (2026)

Current champion
- (United States) Collin Morikawa

Location map
- Location in the United States Location in California

The AT&T Pebble Beach Pro-Am is a professional golf tournament on the PGA Tour, held annually at Pebble Beach, California, near Carmel. The tournament is usually held during the month of February on two different courses, currently Pebble Beach Golf Links, Spyglass Hill Golf Course and previously, Monterey Peninsula Country Club.

The event was originally known as the Bing Crosby National Pro-Amateur, or just the Crosby Clambake. After Crosby's death in 1977, the tournament was hosted by his family for eight years. The Crosby name was dropped after the 1985 event, and AT&T Corporation became the title sponsor in 1986. It is organized by the Monterey Peninsula Foundation.

== History ==
Founded in 1937, the first National Pro-Am Golf Championship was hosted by entertainer Bing Crosby and Larry Crosby in southern California at Rancho Santa Fe Golf Club in San Diego County, the event's location prior to World War II. Sam Snead won the first tournament, then just 18 holes, with a winner's share of $500. A second round was added in 1938 and was played through 1942.

After the war, it resumed in 1947 as a 54-hole event, up the coast on golf courses near Monterey, where it has been played ever since. Beginning that year, it was played at Pebble Beach Golf Links, Cypress Point Club, and Monterey Peninsula Country Club through 1966. The tournament became a 72-hole event in 1958.

In 1967, the new Spyglass Hill replaced Monterey Peninsula CC as the third course (with the exception of 1977, when it returned to MPCC). After 1990, private Cypress Point was dropped by the PGA Tour because it would not admit an African-American member, and was replaced by Poppy Hills in 1991, which hosted through 2009. Poppy Hills was not well received by the players, primarily due to poor drainage, and MPCC returned to the rotation in 2010.

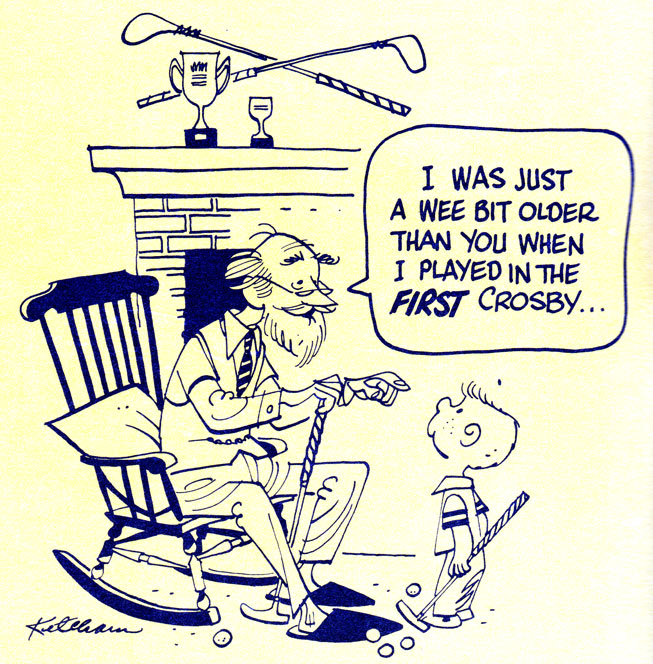
Cartoon by "Dennis the Menace" creator Hank Ketcham from the program for the 1971 Crosby Pro-Am

Notable professionals in recent years have included Tiger Woods, Phil Mickelson, Mark O'Meara, Davis Love III, Jordan Spieth, and Vijay Singh. Notable celebrities have included fan favorite Bill Murray, Glenn Frey, Kevin Costner, Steve Young, George Lopez, Tom Brady, Bill Belichick, Kenny G, Justin Timberlake, Ray Romano, Clay Walker, and Carson Daly. Past celebrities included many Hollywood legends, some of whom were accomplished amateur golfers. Jim Backus, best known as the voice of Mr. Magoo and as Thurston Howell III on Gilligan's Island, made the 36-hole pro-am cut in 1964.

When Gene Littler won the 1975 event, he was the first player who had been on a winning amateur team in this pro-am (which he had done as a 23-year-old in 1954) to have gone on to win it as a pro.

== Current playing format ==
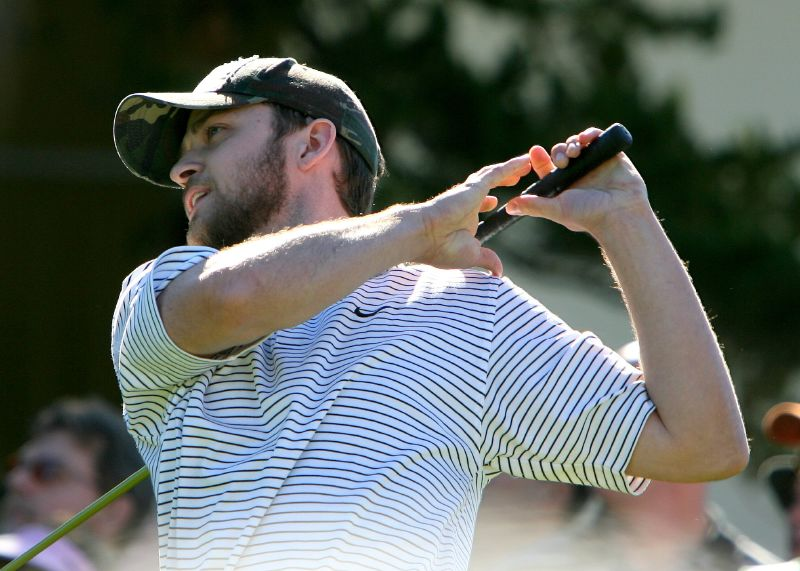
Singer Justin Timberlake at the 2006 AT&T Pebble Beach National Pro-Am.

The starting field consists of 80 professionals and 80 amateurs. Each professional is paired with an amateur partner. On the first two days, 80 two-person teams will play a Better ball format with one round on Pebble Beach and the other round at Spyglass Hill. The pros also play an individual stroke play format. On the last two days, only the pros will advance to the third and final rounds held at Pebble Beach. In addition, there will be fewer celebrities in the pro-am field as well.

== Prior playing format ==
Previously, the starting field consisted of 156 professionals and 156 amateurs. Each professional was paired with an amateur player. On the first three days, 156 two-man teams played a better ball format with one round on each of the three courses. The pros also played an individual stroke play format. On the final day, those professionals and pro-am teams making the 54-hole cut played on the Pebble Beach Golf Links.

- Individual pro cut: At 54 holes, the low 60 scorers plus any ties. Players between 61st and 70th (and ties) received both official money and FedEx Cup points, as the cut for this tournament ensured the field was smaller than a standard tournament cut of 70 to accommodate the pro-am teams playing on the last day. They were indicated as MDF (made cut, did not finish); this designation was used in other PGA Tour events when more than 78 players made the cut and the field was reduced to 70 and ties after the third round.
- Pro-Am cut: At 54 holes, the low 25 teams, plus any ties.

Only professionals competed in the individual competition part of the tournament. Amateurs were restricted to playing only in the pro-amateur team competition. The local Pebble Beach tournament officials organized the pairing of professionals with amateurs, while the PGA Tour managed the assignment of the pros' tee times.

== Professional field ==
The professional field consists of 80 players under the PGA Tour's Signature Events rankings.

1. Top 50: The 50 players who qualified for the BMW Championship at the end of last year's PGA Tour season.
2. Aon Next 10: Players 51–60 in the final points list of the previous season (includes points from the FedEx Fall from the Procore Championship to The RSM Classic)
3. Aon Swing 5: The top five players who scored the most FedEx Cup points in the Sony Open in Hawaii, The American Express, and Farmers Insurance Open provided they are neither a Top 50 or Aon Next 10 player.
4. Current Year Full-Field Winners: Winners of The Sentry, Sony Open in Hawaii, The American Express, and Farmers Insurance Open of the current season.
5. Rankings: Top 30 Official World Golf Ranking players who are PGA Tour members.
6. Up to four sponsor exemptions.
7. Should a player who is in the Top 50 not be in good standing with the PGA Tour, then the 51st place player (and so forth) from after the FedEx St. Jude Championship that did not qualify for the BMW Championship shall be a member of the Top 50 until the eligibility list officially has the Top 50. This will also affect the Aon Next 10 list.
8. If, after sponsor exemptions, there are fewer than 80 players in the field, players 61st and beyond from the final points list of the previous season will be used to fill the field to 80.

== Format ==
Conducted as a planned 72-hole pro-am event, 1958–present. Exceptions are as follows:

- 18 holes: 1937
- 36 holes (planned): 1938 to 1942
- 36 holes, due to bad weather: 1952
- 54 holes (planned): 1947 to 1951, 1953 to 1957
- 54 holes, due to bad weather: 1974, 1981, 1986, 1998, 1999, 2009 and 2024
  - In 1996, the first 36 holes were played as scheduled on Thursday and Friday. Rain on Saturday and Sunday prevented the completion of the tournament and it was canceled (54 holes required to be official due to three course setup).
  - In 1998, weather conditions prevented the tournament from being finished on schedule (9 holes were played Thursday, 9 on Friday, 18 on Saturday, rain Sunday and Monday). The third round was delayed until August to prevent cancellation similar to 1996. 43 of 168 players withdrew rather than return for the final round.
- No pro-am: 2021
  - In 2021, the pro-am section of the tournament was postponed due to safety concerns in relation to the COVID-19 pandemic; as a result Monterey Peninsula was also removed from the course rotation. The amateurs participated in their own tournament during the PURE Insurance Championship PGA Tour Champions event at Pebble Beach in September.
  - In 2023, the pro-am competition was shortened to 54 holes due to high winds on Saturday, February 4; professionals only competed in the final round on Monday, February 5.

== Criticism ==
From the 2000s to 2023, despite being one of the most iconic events on the PGA Tour, many top players tended to skip the event, citing long rounds, celebrity distractions, sketchy weather and the bumpy poa annua greens. Additionally, from 2019, the schedule also made it difficult for players to compete in the event as it was usually the same week as the Saudi International, which also featured a strong field (mainly catered for by large appearance fees). The few top players who did compete regularly at Pebble Beach such as Jordan Spieth, were contractually obligated to compete there due to sponsorship reasons. However, since 2024, the tournament has played as a signature event with elevated purses and FedEx Cup points, and now it has one of the strongest fields on the PGA Tour.

== Tournament hosts ==
Venue	Years	Times
Pebble Beach Golf Links	1947–present	73
Spyglass Hill Golf Course	1967–1976, 1978–present	52
Monterey Peninsula CC, Shore Course	1965, 1966, 1977, 2010–2020, 2022–2023	13
Poppy Hills Golf Course	1991–2009	19
Cypress Point Club	1947–1990	44
Monterey Peninsula CC, Dunes Course	1947–1964	18
Rancho Santa Fe Golf Club	1937–1942	6

== Winners ==
Year	Winner	Score	To par	Margin of victory	Runner(s)-up	Purse ($)	Winner's share ($)	Ref.
AT&T Pebble Beach Pro-Am
2026	(United States) Collin Morikawa	266	−22	1 stroke	(Australia) Min Woo Lee (Austria) Sepp Straka	20,000,000	3,600,000	
2025	(Northern Ireland) Rory McIlroy	267	−21	2 strokes	(Republic of Ireland) Shane Lowry	20,000,000	3,600,000	
2024	(United States) Wyndham Clark	199 (Note: Shortened to 54 holes due to weather.)	−17	1 stroke	(Sweden) Ludvig Åberg	20,000,000	3,600,000	
2023	(England) Justin Rose	269	−18	3 strokes	(United States) Brendon Todd (United States) Brandon Wu	9,000,000	1,620,000	
2022	(United States) Tom Hoge	268	−19	2 strokes	(United States) Jordan Spieth	8,700,000	1,566,000	
2021	(United States) Daniel Berger	270	−18	2 strokes	(United States) Maverick McNealy	7,800,000	1,404,000	
2020	(Canada) Nick Taylor	268	−19	4 strokes	(United States) Kevin Streelman	7,800,000	1,404,000	
2019	(United States) Phil Mickelson (5)	268	−19	3 strokes	(England) Paul Casey	7,600,000	1,368,000	
2018	(United States) Ted Potter Jr.	270	−17	3 strokes	(Australia) Jason Day (United States) Dustin Johnson (United States) Phil Mickelson (United States) Chez Reavie	7,400,000	1,332,000	
2017	(United States) Jordan Spieth	268	−19	4 strokes	(United States) Kelly Kraft	7,200,000	1,296,000	
2016	(United States) Vaughn Taylor	270	−17	1 stroke	(United States) Phil Mickelson	7,000,000	1,260,000	
AT&T Pebble Beach National Pro-Am
2015	(United States) Brandt Snedeker (2)	265	−22	3 strokes	(United States) Nick Watney	6,800,000	1,224,000	
2014	(United States) Jimmy Walker	276	−11	1 stroke	(United States) Dustin Johnson (United States) Jim Renner	6,600,000	1,188,000	
2013	(United States) Brandt Snedeker	267	−19	2 strokes	(United States) Chris Kirk	6,500,000	1,170,000	
2012	(United States) Phil Mickelson (4)	269	−17	2 strokes	(South Korea) Charlie Wi	6,400,000	1,152,000	
2011	(United States) D. A. Points	271	−15	2 strokes	(United States) Hunter Mahan	6,300,000	1,134,000	
2010	(United States) Dustin Johnson (2)	270	−16	1 stroke	(United States) David Duval (United States) J. B. Holmes	6,200,000	1,116,000	
2009	(United States) Dustin Johnson	201	−15	4 strokes	(Canada) Mike Weir	6,100,000	1,098,000	
2008	(United States) Steve Lowery	278	−10	Playoff	(Fiji) Vijay Singh	6,000,000	1,080,000	
2007	(United States) Phil Mickelson (3)	268	−20	5 strokes	(United States) Kevin Sutherland	5,500,000	990,000	
2006	(United States) Arron Oberholser	271	−17	5 strokes	(South Africa) Rory Sabbatini	5,400,000	972,000	
2005	(United States) Phil Mickelson (2)	269	−19	4 strokes	(Canada) Mike Weir	5,300,000	954,000	
2004	(Fiji) Vijay Singh	272	−16	3 strokes	(United States) Jeff Maggert	5,300,000	954,000	
2003	(United States) Davis Love III (2)	274	−14	1 stroke	(United States) Tom Lehman	4,500,000	900,000	
2002	(United States) Matt Gogel	274	−14	3 strokes	(United States) Pat Perez	4,000,000	720,000	
2001	(United States) Davis Love III	272	−16	1 stroke	(Fiji) Vijay Singh	4,000,000	720,000	
2000	(United States) Tiger Woods	273	−15	2 strokes	(United States) Matt Gogel (Fiji) Vijay Singh	4,000,000	720,000	
1999	(United States) Payne Stewart	206	−10	1 stroke	(United States) Frank Lickliter	2,800,000	504,000	
1998	(United States) Phil Mickelson	202	−14	1 stroke	(United States) Tom Pernice Jr.	2,500,000	450,000	
1997	(United States) Mark O'Meara (5)	268	−20	1 stroke	(United States) David Duval (United States) Tiger Woods	1,900,000	342,000	
1996	Canceled after two rounds due to weather							
1995	(United States) Peter Jacobsen	271	−17	2 strokes	(United States) David Duval	1,400,000	252,000	
1994	(United States) Johnny Miller (3)	281	−7	1 stroke	(United States) Jeff Maggert (United States) Corey Pavin (United States) Kirk Triplett (United States) Tom Watson	1,250,000	225,000	
1993	(Australia) Brett Ogle	276	−12	3 strokes	(United States) Billy Ray Brown	1,250,000	225,000	
1992	(United States) Mark O'Meara (4)	275	−13	Playoff	(United States) Jeff Sluman	1,100,000	198,000	
1991	(United States) Paul Azinger	274	−14	4 strokes	(United States) Brian Claar (United States) Corey Pavin	1,100,000	198,000	
1990	(United States) Mark O'Meara (3)	281	−7	2 strokes	(United States) Kenny Perry	1,000,000	180,000	
1989	(United States) Mark O'Meara (2)	277	−11	1 stroke	(United States) Tom Kite	1,000,000	180,000	
1988	(United States) Steve Jones	280	−8	Playoff	(United States) Bob Tway	700,000	126,000	
1987	(United States) Johnny Miller (2)	278	−10	1 stroke	(United States) Payne Stewart	600,000	108,000	
1986	(United States) Fuzzy Zoeller	205	−11	5 strokes	(United States) Payne Stewart	600,000	108,000	
Bing Crosby National Pro-Am
1985	(United States) Mark O'Meara	283	−5	1 stroke	(Japan) Kikuo Arai (United States) Larry Rinker (United States) Curtis Strange	500,000	90,000	
1984	(United States) Hale Irwin	278	−10	Playoff	(Canada) Jim Nelford	400,000	72,000	
1983	(United States) Tom Kite	276	−12	2 strokes	(United States) Rex Caldwell (United States) Calvin Peete	325,000	58,500	
1982	(United States) Jim Simons	274	−14	2 strokes	(United States) Craig Stadler	300,000	54,000	
1981	(United States) John Cook	209	−7	Playoff	(United States) Bobby Clampett (United States) Ben Crenshaw (United States) Hale Irwin (United States) Barney Thompson	225,000	40,500	
1980	(United States) George Burns	280	−8	1 stroke	(United States) Dan Pohl	300,000	54,000	
1979	(United States) Lon Hinkle	284	−4	Playoff	(United States) Andy Bean (United States) Mark Hayes	300,000	54,000	
1978	(United States) Tom Watson (2)	280	−8	Playoff	(United States) Ben Crenshaw	225,000	45,000	
1977	(United States) Tom Watson	273	−15	1 stroke	(England) Tony Jacklin	200,000	40,000	
1976	(United States) Ben Crenshaw	281	−7	2 strokes	(United States) Mike Morley	185,000	37,000	
1975	(United States) Gene Littler	280	−8	4 strokes	(United States) Hubert Green	185,000	37,000	
1974	(United States) Johnny Miller	208	−8	4 strokes	(United States) Grier Jones	138,750	27,750	
1973	(United States) Jack Nicklaus (3)	282	−6	Playoff	(United States) Raymond Floyd (United States) Orville Moody	180,000	36,000	
1972	(United States) Jack Nicklaus (2)	284	−4	Playoff	(United States) Johnny Miller	140,000	28,000	
1971	(United States) Tom Shaw	278	−10	2 strokes	(United States) Arnold Palmer	135,000	27,000	
1970	(United States) Bert Yancey	278	−10	1 stroke	(United States) Jack Nicklaus	125,000	25,000	
1969	(United States) George Archer	283	−5	1 stroke	(United States) Bob Dickson (United States) Dale Douglass (United States) Howie Johnson	125,000	25,000	
1968	(United States) Johnny Pott	285	−3	Playoff	(United States) Billy Casper (Australia) Bruce Devlin	80,000	16,000	
1967	(United States) Jack Nicklaus	284	−4	5 strokes	(United States) Billy Casper	80,000	16,000	
1966	(United States) Don Massengale	283	−4	1 stroke	(United States) Arnold Palmer	104,500	11,000	
1965	(Australia) Bruce Crampton	284	−3	3 strokes	(United States) Tony Lema	84,500	7,500	
1964	(United States) Tony Lema	284	−4	3 strokes	(United States) Gay Brewer (United States) Bo Wininger	60,000	5,800	
1963	(United States) Billy Casper (2)	285	−3	1 stroke	(United States) Dave Hill (United States) Jack Nicklaus (South Africa) Gary Player (United States) Bob Rosburg (United States) Art Wall Jr.	50,000	5,300	
1962	(United States) Doug Ford	286	−2	Playoff	(United States) Joe Campbell	50,000	5,300	
1961	(United States) Bob Rosburg	282	−6	1 stroke	(Argentina) Roberto De Vicenzo (United States) Dave Ragan	50,000	5,300	
1960	(United States) Ken Venturi	286	−2	3 strokes	(United States) Julius Boros (United States) Tommy Jacobs	50,000	4,000	
1959	(United States) Art Wall Jr.	279	−9	2 strokes	(United States) Jimmy Demaret (United States) Gene Littler		4,000	
Bing Crosby National Pro-Am Golf Championship
1958	(United States) Billy Casper	277	−11	4 strokes	(United States) Dave Marr		4,000	
1957	(United States) Jay Hebert	213	−3	2 strokes	(United States) Cary Middlecoff		2,500	
1956	(United States) Cary Middlecoff (2)	202	−14	5 strokes	(United States) Mike Souchak		2,500	
1955	(United States) Cary Middlecoff	209	−7	4 strokes	(United States) Julius Boros (United States) Paul McGuire		2,500	
1954	(United States) Dutch Harrison (2)	210	−6	1 stroke	(United States) Jimmy Demaret		2,000	
1953	(United States) Lloyd Mangrum (2)	204	−12	4 strokes	(United States) Julius Boros		2,000	
Bing Crosby Pro-Am
1952	(United States) Jimmy Demaret	145 (Note: Shortened to 36 holes due to weather.)	+1	2 strokes	(United States) Art Bell		2,000	
1951	(United States) Byron Nelson	209	−7	3 strokes	(United States) Cary Middlecoff		2,000	
1950	(United States) Jack Burke Jr. (United States) Dave Douglas (United States) Smiley Quick (United States) Sam Snead (4)	214	−2	n/a			2,000 (Note: Four-way tie in 1950, no playoff, each won $1237.50)	
1949	(United States) Ben Hogan	208	−8	2 strokes	(Australia) Jim Ferrier		2,000	
1948	(United States) Lloyd Mangrum	205	−10	5 strokes	(Canada) Stan Leonard		2,000	
1947	(United States) George Fazio (United States) Ed Furgol	213	−3	n/a			2,000 (Note: Tie in 1947, no playoff, each won $1625)	
1943–1946: No tournament due to World War II
1942	(United States) Johnny Dawson (a)	133	−11	3 strokes	(United States) Leland Gibson (United States) Lloyd Mangrum		(800) (Note: Won by amateur in 1942, top two professionals each took $700)	
1941	(United States) Sam Snead (3)	136	−8	1 stroke	(United States) Craig Wood		500	
1940	(United States) Ed Oliver	135	−9	3 strokes	(United States) Vic Ghezzi		500	
1939	(United States) Dutch Harrison	138		1 stroke	(United States) Byron Nelson (United States) Horton Smith		500	
1938	(United States) Sam Snead (2)	139	−5	2 strokes	(United States) Jimmy Hines		500	
1937	(United States) Sam Snead	68 (Note: Shortened to 18 holes due to weather.)	−4	4 strokes	(United States) George Von Elm		500	

== Multiple winners ==
Thirteen players have won this tournament more than once through 2022.

- 5 wins
  - Mark O'Meara: 1985, 1989, 1990, 1992, 1997
  - Phil Mickelson: 1998, 2005, 2007, 2012, 2019
- 4 wins
  - Sam Snead: 1937, 1938, 1941, 1950 (tie)
- 3 wins
  - Jack Nicklaus: 1967, 1972, 1973
  - Johnny Miller: 1974, 1987, 1994
- 2 wins
  - Lloyd Mangrum: 1948, 1953
  - Dutch Harrison: 1939, 1954
  - Cary Middlecoff: 1955, 1956
  - Billy Casper: 1958, 1963
  - Tom Watson: 1977, 1978
  - Davis Love III: 2001, 2003
  - Dustin Johnson: 2009, 2010
  - Brandt Snedeker: 2013, 2015

In addition, Nicklaus won the U.S. Open at Pebble Beach in 1972, Watson in 1982.

Two others have won an AT&T and a U.S. Open at Pebble Beach; Tom Kite (1983 & 1992), and Tiger Woods (2000 & 2000).

Two golfers have won an AT&T and the PGA Tour Champions tournament; John Cook (1981 Crosby & 2014 First Tee) and Hale Irwin (1984 AT&T and 2005 First Tee). Both tournaments are played at Spyglass Hill and Pebble Beach.
