= RSA Judicial Building =

- RSA Dexter Avenue
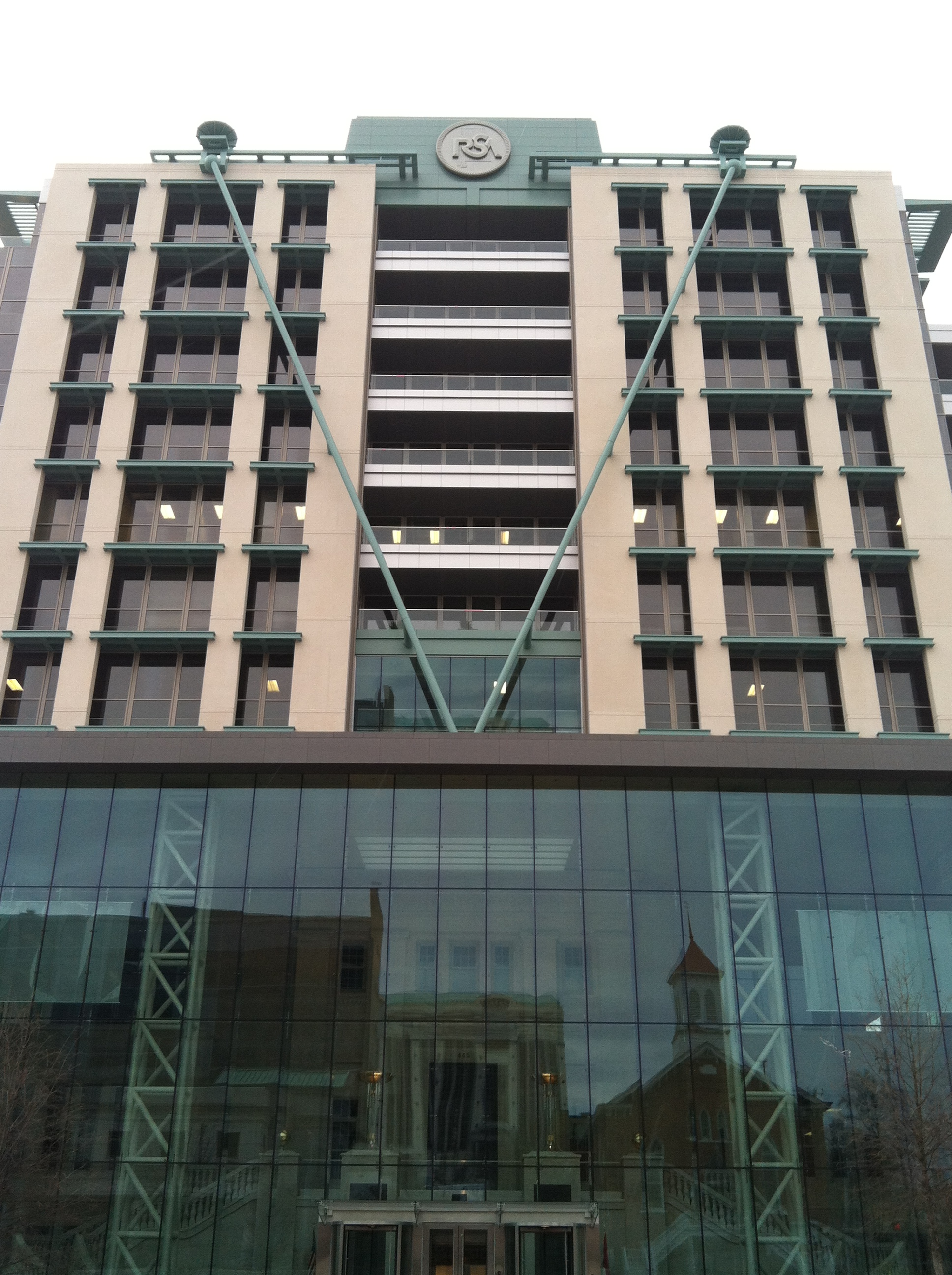
- Interactive map of the RSA Judicial Building area

General information
- Type: Office highrise
- Location: Montgomery, Alabama
- Coordinates: 32.3782415°N 86.303048°W
- Completed: 2011
- Cost: $185 million
- Owner: Retirement Systems of Alabama

Height
- Roof: 58.83 m (193.0 ft)

Technical details
- Floor count: 12
- Floor area: 525,000 square feet (48,800 m^{2})

Design and construction
- Architect: 2WR Holmes Wilkins Architects

Website
- https://www.rsa-al.gov/real-estate/office-building-portfolio/rsa-dexter-avenue-building/

The RSA Judicial Building, also known as RSA Dexter Avenue Building, is office high-rise in Montgomery, Alabama owned by Retirement Systems of Alabama (RSA) completed in 2011. Built on the grounds of the former home of the Alabama Supreme Court its incorporates the 1926 three-story courthouse complex called the Judicial Building within its 50 ft (15 m) glass atrium.

== Alabama Supreme Court building ==
The earlier building was built in 1926 as the Scottish Rite Temple with an Egyptian motif. It was sold to the state in 1932 and became home to the Alabama Supreme Court and the Alabama' appellate courts and was called the Judicial Building. It was remodeled in 1938 in a Works Progress Administration project when the exterior was stripped and modernized. It was vacated and fell into disuse after the court system relocated to the newly-built Alabama Judicial Building circa 1994.

== RSA building ==
The Retirement Systems of Alabama (RSA) project for a new building began in 2007. Its design and location were a source of controversy for its height, the preservation of the courthouse and the effect it have of streetscape and views of the Alabama State Capitol. While Montgomery's city planning code prohibits structures along Dexter Avenue taller than six stories, state buildings are exempt from the regulation.

The RSA building is 12 stories, 58.83 metres (193.0 ft) tall and is clad in glass curtain wall facade. While the is exterior steps were removed, a fully restored historic Alabama Supreme Court Building was incorporated into the new structure is highlighted in 50 ft (15 m) glass atrium.

Inside the atrium is an "honor court" with statues of the Alabama Supreme Court chief justices who served in the older building. The building also houses a datacenter for the region.

== See also ==
- RSA Trustmark Building
- RSA Battle House Tower
