= Mike Strantz =

American golf course architect

- Born: May 27, 1955; Toledo, Ohio
- Died: June 10, 2005 (aged 50)
- Education: Michigan State University
- Occupation: Architect
- Practice: Golf Course architect

Mike Strantz (May 27, 1955 - June 10, 2005) was an American golf course architect based out of South Carolina. In 2000, he was named as one of the "Top 10 Greatest Golf Architects of All Time" by Golfweek magazine.

== Life and career ==
Strantz was born in Toledo, Ohio and raised in Walbridge. He graduated from Michigan State University in 1978 with a degree in turf grass management. He began his career working on the grounds crew at Inverness Club in Toledo where Tom Fazio was preparing the course for the 1979 U.S. Open. Fazio noticed that Strantz had a gift for the work and was invited to join his construction crew in Hilton Head, South Carolina on Moss Creek Plantation. Strantz continued to work for eight additional years as an on-site designer for Fazio’s Links and Harbour courses at Wild Dunes near Charleston, Lake Nona, Wade Hampton Club, Osprey Point on Kiawah Island and Black Diamond Ranch in Florida among others.

In 1987, he left Fazio’s company to oversee the reconstruction of Wild Dunes and for the construction of Dunes West in Mt. Pleasant, South Carolina. Upon completion of Dunes West, Strantz was hired by Myrtle Beach's Legends Group as Director of Golf Design for their Parkland course.

He formed his own design company, Michael Strantz Studios in 1988 where he was free to apply his own design philosophies to forthcoming projects. His first solo project was Caledonia Golf and Fish Club on Pawleys Island, South Carolina in 1993. Strantz designed nine courses:

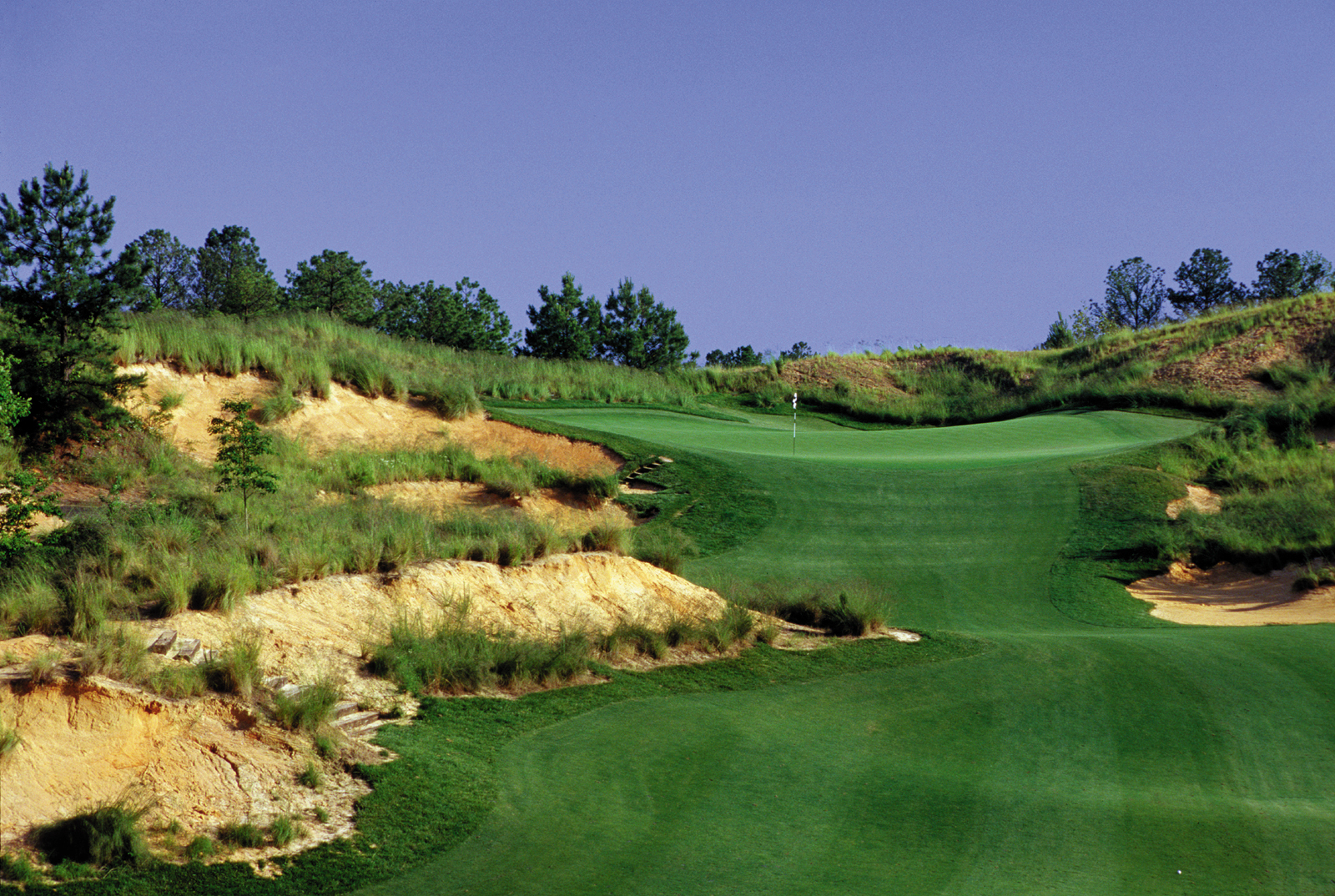
Tobacco Road Golf Club #16

- Caledonia Golf and Fish Club (South Carolina)
- True Blue (South Carolina)
- Bulls Bay (South Carolina)
- Tobacco Road (North Carolina)
- Tot Hill Farm (North Carolina)
- Royal New Kent (Virginia)
- Stonehouse (Virginia)
- Silver Creek Valley (California)
- Monterey Peninsula Country Club - Shore Course (California)

Strantz's last project before his death from cancer at the age of 50, was the renovation of Monterey Peninsula Country Club Shore Course. Among his acknowledgments, Strantz was listed as one of the "Top 10 Greatest Golf Architects of All Time" by Golfweek in 2000, and he was earlier described as the "most in-demand course designer in the U.S." by Golf World in 1989. Three of his courses were listed in the top twenty of Golf Digest's 2007 list of the 50 toughest golf courses in the US.
