= Robert Trent Jones =

British-American golf course architect (1906–2000)

Robert Trent Jones Sr.
- Born: June 20, 1906; Ince-in-Makerfield, England
- Died: June 14, 2000 (aged 93); Fort Lauderdale, Florida, U.S.
- Education: Cornell University
- Occupation: Architect
- Spouse: Ione Tefft Davis (m. 1934; died 1987)
- Children: Robert Trent Jones Jr. and Rees Jones
- Awards: World Golf Hall of Fame; Old Tom Morris Award
- Projects: See article

Robert Trent Jones Sr. (June 20, 1906 – June 14, 2000) was a British–American golf course architect who designed or re-designed more than 500 golf courses in 45 U.S. states and 35 countries. In reference to this, Jones took pride in saying, "The sun never sets on a Robert Trent Jones golf course." He is often confused with the famous amateur golfer Bobby Jones with whom he worked from time to time. Jones received the 1987 Old Tom Morris Award from the Golf Course Superintendents Association of America, GCSAA's highest honor. Also in 1987, he was inducted into the World Golf Hall of Fame.

== Early life and education ==
Robert Trent Jones was born on June 20, 1906, in Ince-in-Makerfield, England, to Welsh parents. At age five or six, Jones emigrated with his parents to the United States, where they arrived in East Rochester, New York. Jones worked as a caddie at The Country Club of Rochester and accepted a job as golf professional at Sodus Bay Heights Golf Club in nearby Sodus Point, New York. He met Donald Ross as a youth and, taking up the game, recorded the best score of all the amateur golfers at the 1927 Canadian Open and set a course record at Rochester.

While working as a golf professional, Jones attended Cornell University, undergoing a customized course of study that would allow him to pursue his interest in golf course design, during which time he designed nine holes of the university's golf course, now known as the Robert Trent Jones Golf Course at Cornell University (he designed the other nine holes in 1954). While at Cornell, Jones joined Delta Kappa Epsilon (DKE) Fraternity.

== Career ==
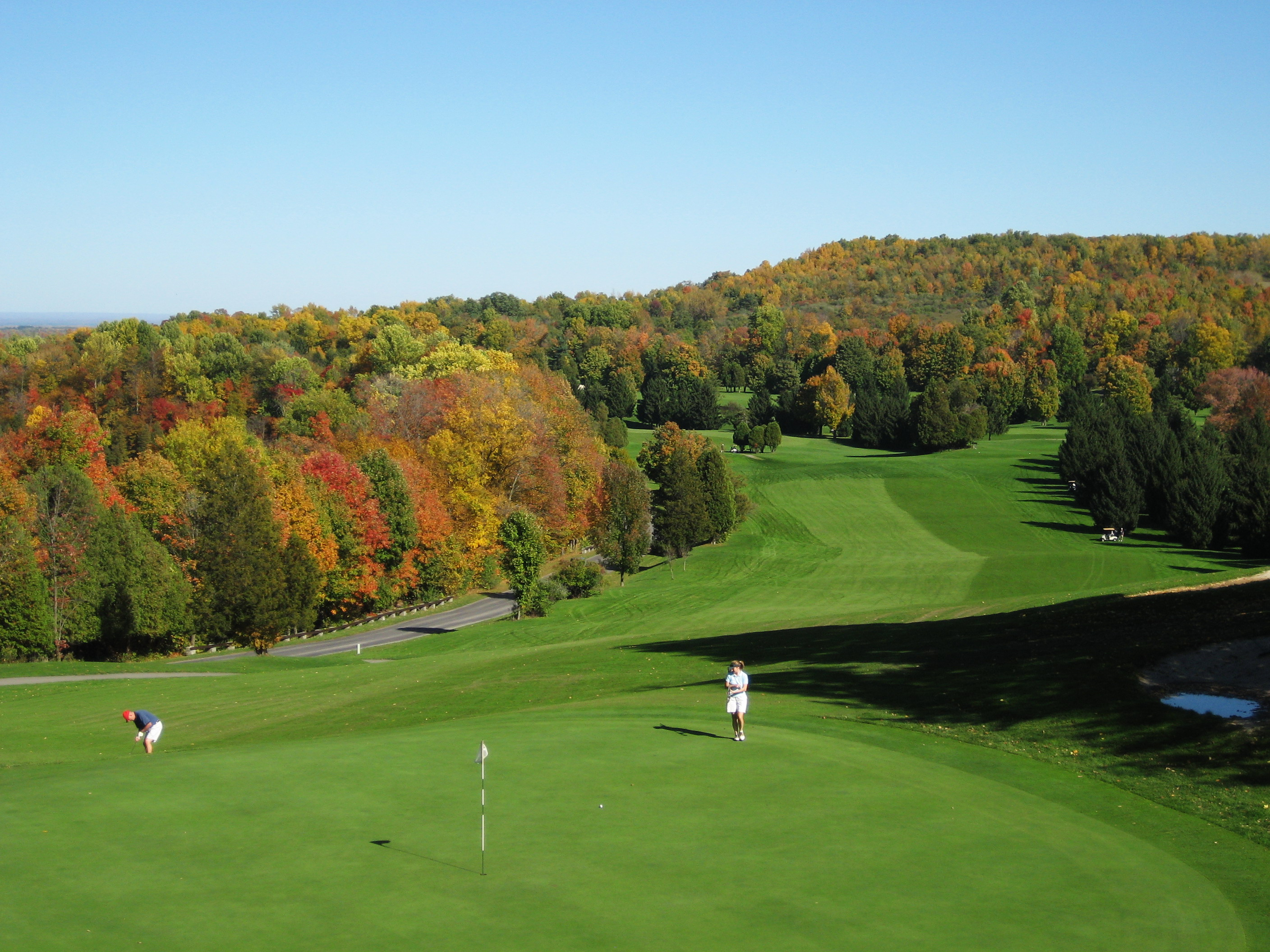
The golf course at Green Lakes State Park in upstate New York was designed by Robert Trent Jones and opened in 1936.

Jones went into business with Canadian architect Stanley Thompson after concluding his studies at Cornell, and with him designed courses in Canada. Following his partnership with Thompson, Jones went into business on his own and began designing local courses in the United States in the 1930s. Many of these, such as the 1936 course at Green Lakes State Park (see photo), were built using labor provided by the Works Progress Administration.

Shortly after World War II, Jones got his first major assignment designing the Peachtree Golf Club in Atlanta in collaboration with golf legend Bobby Jones. At Bobby Jones' request, Jones redesigned the 11th and 16th holes at Augusta National Golf Club. Despite the similarity of their names, the two men were not related. To distinguish himself from Bobby, he soon afterward began to go by his middle name, Trent.

In 1955, Gene Hamm helped Jones build the Duke University Golf Course in Durham, North Carolina. He moved from there to Delaware to continue work with Jones, and then in 1959 moved back to Raleigh where he began his own design career. During the 1950s, Jones' annual income was reported as being $600,000—according to Golf Digest, no one other than Ben Hogan earned more money from golf at that time.

Jones' clients included U.S. President Dwight D. Eisenhower, for a putting green at the White House and a single hole at Camp David, as well as the Rockefeller family, Aga Khan and Hassan II of Morocco, for private courses. He was commissioned in 1990 to design a set of 18 courses in Alabama, the Robert Trent Jones Golf Trail, the largest single golf design contract in history.

In 1979, the Northern California Golf Association selected Robert Trent Jones Sr., son Jones Jr., to design the Poppy Hills Golf Course situated in Pebble Beach, California. Jones Sr. had previously crafted the Spyglass Hill Golf Course in Pebble Beach, and during this project, he received valuable assistance from his son. Their combined expertise has led them to design of over 400 golf courses worldwide.

== Personal life ==
Jones married Ione Tefft Davis in 1934, who died in 1987 and with whom he had two sons: Robert Jr. and Rees, both of whom became golf course architects.

== Death ==
Jones continued to design golf courses in his later years until health problems prompted him to retire to Ft. Lauderdale, Florida, where he died on June 14, 2000, at age 93. His final course, the Southern Highlands Golf Club, was completed in 1999.

== Awards and honors ==
- In 1987, Jones was honored with the Old Tom Morris Award from the Golf Course Superintendents Association of America.
- In 1987, he was inducted into the World Golf Hall of Fame.
- In 1972, Jones was honored with the Golden Plate Award of the American Academy of Achievement.

== See also ==
- List of golf courses designed by Robert Trent Jones
