= David G. Bronner =

American businessman (born 1945)

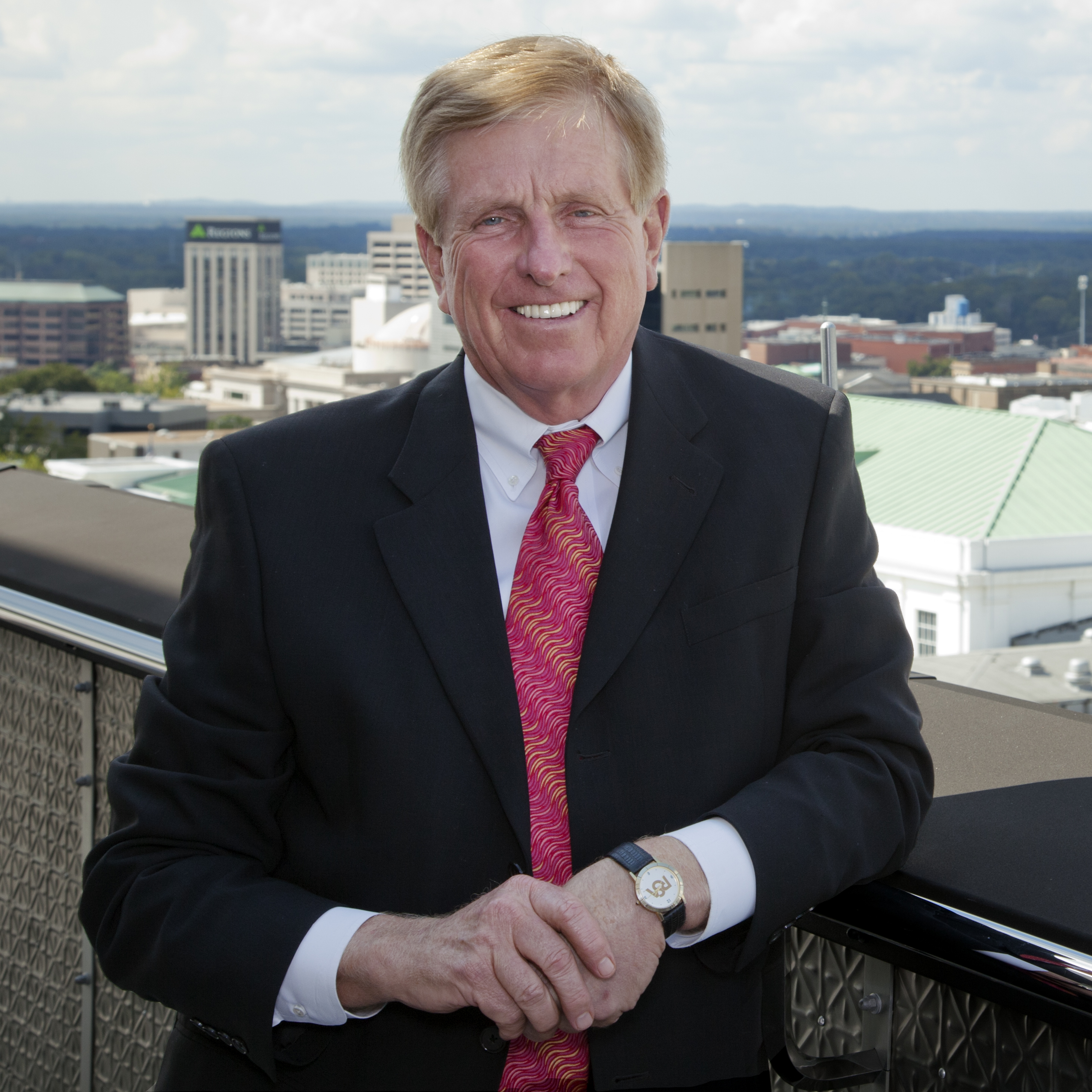

Personal details
- Born: David George Bronner; January 22, 1945 (age 81)
- Occupation: CEO of Retirement Systems of Alabama

David George Bronner (born January 22, 1945) is an American businessman. He is best known as the head of Retirement Systems of Alabama (RSA), the pension fund for employees of the State of Alabama. Bronner briefly served as the chairman of US Airways in the 1990s when RSA owned many shares in the airline.

== Life and career ==
Bronner was born in Cresco, Iowa, the son of George David and Marge Bronner. His father owned a pool hall in Minnesota. He received his elementary and high school education in the Catholic school system in Austin, Minnesota graduating from Pacelli Catholic High School in 1963. He obtained his Bachelor of Arts and Master of Arts degrees at Mankato State University (now Minnesota State University, Mankato), in Mankato, Minnesota. From 1967 to 1969, Bronner was an instructor in the School of Business and Finance at Mankato State. He then entered the University of Alabama School of Law, where he earned a J.D. degree in 1971 and a Ph.D. in 1972.

After teaching in various graduate schools of Education and Business, he was appointed as assistant dean of the Law School at the University of Alabama. Shortly thereafter, Bronner took his present job with RSA in 1973. At that time RSA had approximately $500 million of funds and was owed $1.5 billion by the state. By the end of 2017, RSA had amassed over $38 billion in investments making RSA the 50th largest public pension fund in the world.

In 2022, 1819 News named Bronner the highest-paid state employee in Alabama, having taken an income of $834,034 the previous year.
