= Spyglass Hill Golf Course =

Golf course in California, US

Coordinates: 36.582°N 121.957°W

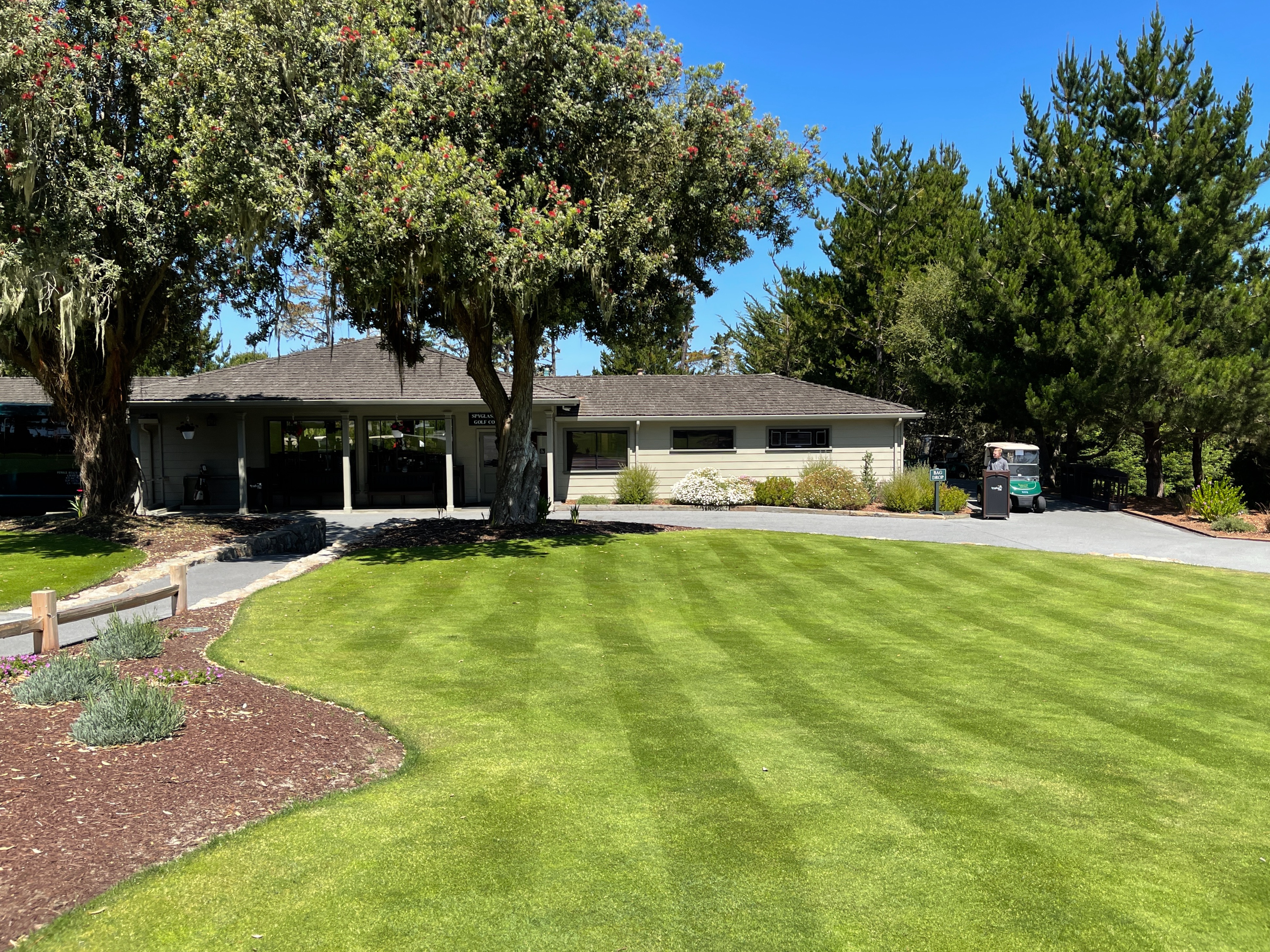
- Spyglass Hill Golf Course

- Location in the United States Location in California

Club information
- Location: Pebble Beach, California,
- Elevation: 100 feet (30 m)
- Established: 1966, 60 years ago
- Type: Public
- Owner: Pebble Beach Company
- Operator: Pebble Beach Company
- Tota holes: 18
- Tournaments: AT&T Pebble Beach Pro-Am (1967–present)
- Website: Pebble Beach Resorts

Spyglass Hill Golf Course
- Designed by: Robert Trent Jones Sr.
- Par: 72
- Length: 7,026 yards (6,425 m)
- Course rating: 75.4
- Slope rating: 145
- Course record: 62 – Phil Mickelson (2005) and Luke Donald (2006)

Spyglass Hill Golf Course is a golf course on the west coast of the United States, located on the Monterey Peninsula in California. The course is part of the Pebble Beach Company, which also owns the Pebble Beach Golf Links, The Links at Spanish Bay, and the Del Monte Golf Course. The PGA golf head pro at Spyglass Hill is Patrick Gannon.

Golf Digest has ranked Spyglass Hill as high as fifth on its list of "America's 100 Greatest Public Courses". It has also featured in the popular Tiger Woods PGA Tour series of video games, along with the sister course Pebble Beach.

== History ==
Spyglass Hill was designed by Robert Trent Jones Sr., and opened 60 years ago on March 11, 1966, after six years of planning, design, and construction. Since 1967, it has been in the rotation of the multi-course AT&T Pebble Beach Pro-Am, a February tournament on the West Coast Swing of the PGA Tour. It will host a senior women's major professional golf tournament, the U.S. Senior Women's Open in 2030.

Originally called Pebble Beach Pines Golf Club, it was renamed to Spyglass Hill by Samuel F. B. Morse (1885–1969), the founder of Pebble Beach Company, after the place in the 1883 novel Treasure Island by Robert Louis Stevenson (1850–1894), who had spent time in the Monterey area in 1879. All the holes at Spyglass Hill were named by Bob Hanna, executive director of the Northern California Golf Association, after characters and places from the novel.

Its par-72 layout measures 6,960 yards (6,364 m) from the championship (blue) tees, with a course rating of 75.4 and a slope rating of 145. The first five holes all have views of the Pacific Ocean, and the other thirteen wind through the Del Monte Forest.

The course record of 62 (–10) was set by Phil Mickelson in 2005 and equaled by Luke Donald the next year; both were carded on Thursday of the AT&T under calm conditions.

The back tees at Spyglass Hill were called "Tiger tees" when it opened, long before the birth of Tiger Woods.

== Layout ==
The first hole is called Treasure Island, and is a downhill 597-yard (546 m) par 5, which doglegs almost 90 degrees to the left. One of the more renowned holes is the fourth, a 376-yard (344 m) par 4 named Blind Pew, which Robert Trent Jones called his favorite par 4. The green is the most photographed on the course, and is surrounded by ice plant. Other hole names include The Black Spot (3rd), Captain Flint (10th), and Long John Silver (14th).

Hole	Name	Yards	Par	Hole	Name	Yards	Par
1	Treasure Island	597	5	10	Captain Flint	409	4
2	Billy Bones	349	4	11	Admiral Benbow	562	5
3	The Black Spot	171	3	12	Skeleton Island	177	3
4	Blind Pew	376	4	13	Tom Morgan	458	4
5	Bird Rock	203	3	14	Long John Silver	558	5
6	Israel Hands	441	4	15	Jim Hawkins	132	3
7	Indian Village	545	5	16	Black Dog	469	4
8	Signal Hill	398	4	17	Ben Gunn	324	4
9	Captain Smollett	430	4	18	Spyglass	427	4
Out		3,510	36	In		3,516	36
				Total		7,026	72

== Scorecard ==
Spyglass Hill Golf Course
Tee	Rating/Slope	1	2	3	4	5	6	7	8	9	Out	10	11	12	13	14	15	16	17	18	In	Total
Blue	75.4 / 145	597	349	171	376	203	441	545	398	430	3510	409	562	177	458	558	132	469	324	427	3516	7026
Gold	73.3 / 140	565	321	147	370	173	408	520	372	414	3290	376	490	159	430	525	122	447	316	404	3269	6559
White	71.8 / 133	533	300	128	360	138	372	479	356	393	3059	366	459	143	393	514	101	433	304	378	3091	6150
Green	70.0 / 128	523	292	124	353	126	324	469	310	353	2874	319	451	123	353	487	95	404	295	360	2887	5761
Red	67.4 / 122	488	241	83	302	94	320	462	300	349	2639	315	420	95	322	481	83	286	266	332	2600	5239
SI	Men's	3	13	17	9	15	7	11	1	5		12	10	16	4	6	18	2	14	8
Par		5	4	3	4	3	4	5	4	4	36	4	5	3	4	5	3	4	4	4	36	72
SI	Women's	5	13	17	9	15	1	7	11	3		6	12	16	8	2	18	10	14	4
