= Monterey Peninsula Country Club =

Golf club in Pebble Beach, California

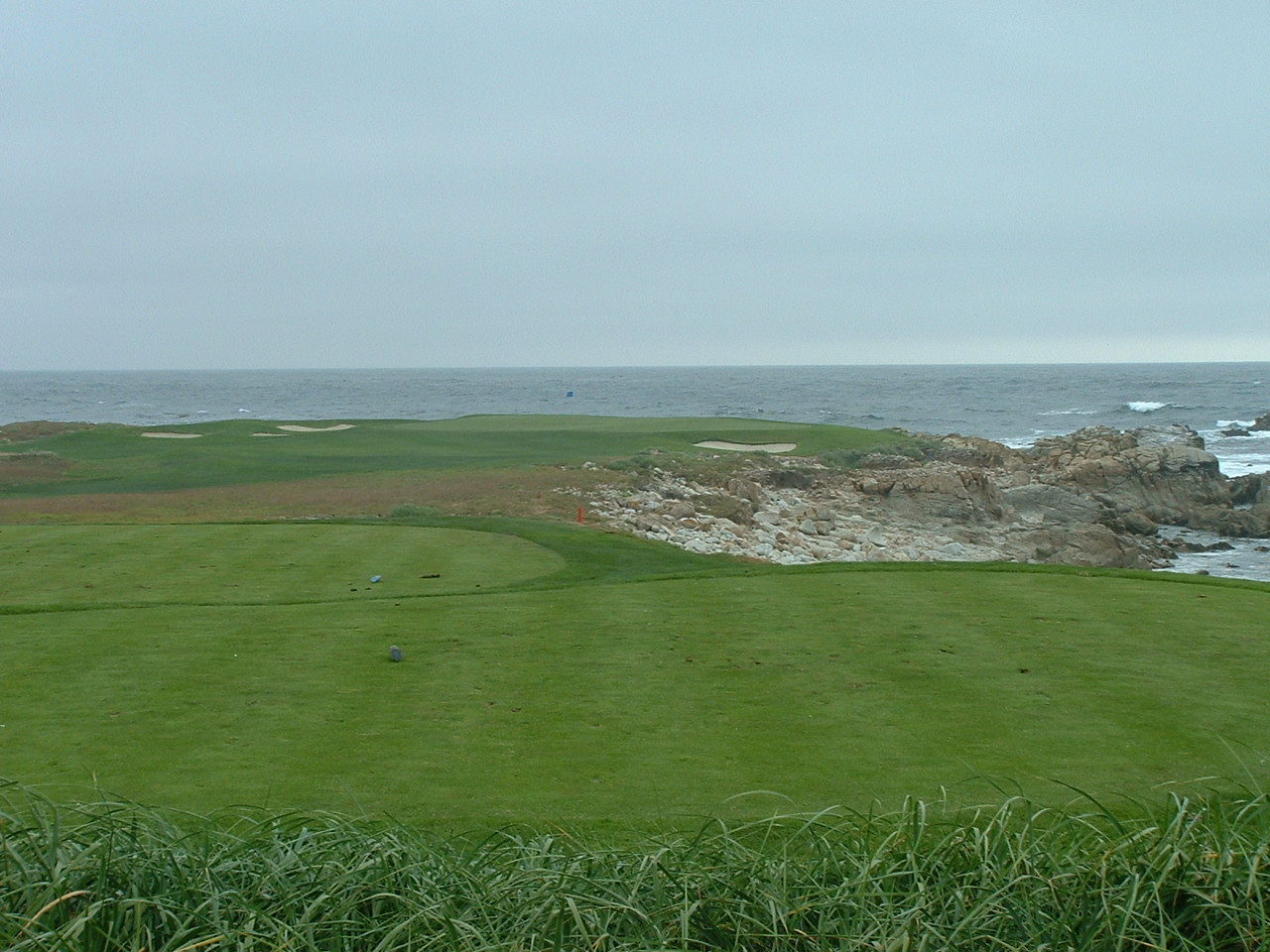
- Dunes 14th hole in 2003

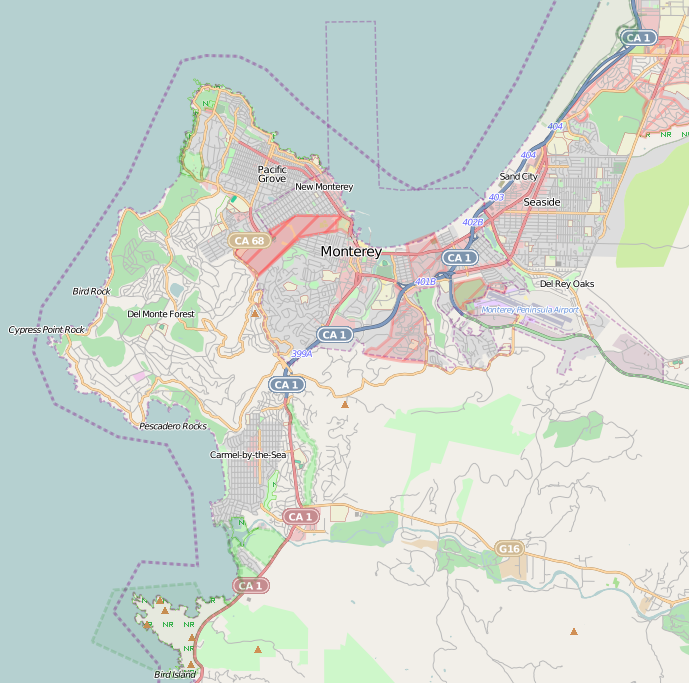
- Location in the United States Location in California Location in Monterey Peninsula
- 36.6014°N 121.9484°W

Club information
- Location: Pebble Beach, California
- Elevation: 100 feet (30 m)
- Established: 1925; 101 years ago<100 year
- Type: Private
- Tota holes: 36
- Website: www.mpccpb.org

Dunes Course
- Designed by: Seth Raynor (1924); Rees Jones (1998); Fazio Design Group (2016)
- Par: 72
- Length: 7,090 yards (6,483 m)
- Course rating: 74.0
- Slope rating: 136
- Course record: 63 – Tony Holguin (1954)

Shore Course
- Designed by: Bob E. Baldock and Jack Neville (1960); Mike Strantz (2003)
- Par: 72
- Length: 6,873 yards (6,285 m)
- Course rating: 73.7
- Slope rating: 134
- Course record: 60 – Sung Kang (2016)

The Monterey Peninsula Country Club (MPCC) is a 36-hole golf club on the West Coast of the United States, located on the Monterey Peninsula in Pebble Beach, California.

== History ==
On February 1, 1919, Samuel F. B. Morse formed the Del Monte Properties and purchased extensive real estate holdings on the Monterey Peninsula. He hired East Coast architects, Charles B. Macdonald and his associate, Seth Raynor to design the Dunes course in 1924. Raynor died in 1926 before construction was complete. Golf designer Robert Hunter was called in to finish out the construction of the course.

On January 19, 1925, a charter for the Monterey Peninsula Country Club was granted by the state of California. A month later, an organizational meeting was called and Samuel F. B. Morse was elected president of the newly formed club.

On February 19, 1925, there were 68 charter members of the Monterey Peninsula Country Club. Formal opening of the new country club was on July 2, 1926, with over 300 at the grand opening.

The club properties account for roughly four hundred acres (1.6 km^{2}) of land in the central region of the Monterey Peninsula. The Shore Course was designed by Bob E. Baldock and Jack Neville in 1959 after the members purchased the club from Del Monte Properties.

Bruce Harris redesigned the Shore course in 1962, and it was later redesigned in 2003 by Mike Strantz.

In 2010, the Shore course returned to the rotation of the AT&T Pebble Beach Pro-Am, a PGA Tour event founded by entertainer Bing Crosby and played on three courses. The Dunes course hosted the event from 1947 to 1964 and the Shore course hosted in 1965, 1966, and 1977.
