= List of golf courses designed by A. W. Tillinghast =

This is a list of golf courses for the design of which American golf course architect A. W. Tillinghast was at least in part responsible.

- OD denotes courses for which Tillinghast is the original designer
- R denotes courses reconstructed by Tillinghast
- A denotes courses for which Tillinghast made substantial additions
- E denotes courses that Tillinghast examined and on the construction of which he consulted

Name	Contribution	Year built	City / Town	State / Province	Country	Comments
CC of Birmingham	E	1936	Birmingham	Alabama	United States	
Gadsden CC	R/A	1936	Gadsden	Alabama	United States	
CC of Mobile	R	1936	Mobile	Alabama	United States	
El Rio CC	R/A	1936	Tucson	Arizona	United States	
Stockdale CC	R	1936	Bakersfield	California	United States	
Los Serranos CC	R	1936	Chino Hills	California	United States	
Coronado CC	R	1937	Coronado	California	United States	
Lake Merced CC	R/A	1936	Daly City	California	United States	
Hacienda CC	R	1920	La Habra Heights	California	United States	
Lakewood CC	E	1936	Lakewood	California	United States	
Lakewood CC	R	1937	Long Beach	California	United States	
Virginia CC	OD	1939	Long Beach	California	United States	
Los Altos GC	E	1936	Los Altos	California	United States	
Hillcrest CC	R	1937	Los Angeles	California	United States	
Claremont CC	R	1936	Oakland	California	United States	
Orinda CC	R	1937	Orinda	California	United States	
Palos Verdes GC	R	1936	Palos Verdes	California	United States	
Brookside GC	R/A	1938	Pasadena	California	United States	
Midwick CC	E		Alhambra	California	United States	Opened 1913. Destroyed by fire 1944
Monterey Bay G&CC	R	1936	Soquel	California	United States	Extinct.
Del Paso CC	E	1937	Sacramento	California	United States	
La Mesa CC	R	1936	San Diego	California	United States	
Presidio GC	R/A	1936	San Francisco	California	United States	
San Francisco GC	OD	1918	San Francisco	California	United States	
San Jose CC	R/A	1937	San Jose	California	United States	
Peninsula CC	R	1936	San Mateo	California	United States	minor redesign, (formerly Beresford CC)
San Mateo GC	R/A	1937	San Mateo	California	United States	
La Cumbre G&CC	R/A	1936	Santa Barbara	California	United States	
Denver CC	R	1936	Denver	Colorado	United States	
Lakewood CC	R	1936	Lakewood	Colorado	United States	
Wee Burn C	R	1936	Darien	Connecticut	United States	
Brooklawn CC	R/A	1930	Fairfield	Connecticut	United States	
CC of Fairfield	R/A	1936	Fairfield	Connecticut	United States	
CC of Farmington	E	1935	Farmington	Connecticut	United States	
Round Hill C	E	1935	Greenwich	Connecticut	United States	
Manchester CC	R	1935	Manchester	Connecticut	United States	
Norfolk CC	OD	1928	Norfolk	Connecticut	United States	
Innis Arden GC	R/A		Old Greenwich	Connecticut	United States	formerly Sound Beach
Woodway CC	E		Stamford	Connecticut	United States	
Wampanoug CC	R	1935	West Hartford	Connecticut	United States	
Atlantic Beach GC	OD	1916	Atlantic Beach	Florida	United States	Extinct
Bobby Jones GC	E	1935	Sarasota	Florida	United States	
Davis Shores CC	OD	1926	St. Augustine	Florida	United States	
Lakewood GC	R/A		St. Petersburg	Florida	United States	
St. Petersburg CC, Davista	OD		St. Petersburg	Florida	United States	formerly Jungle Club, Extinct
Capital City CC	OD	1936	Tallahassee	Florida	United States	9 holes
Davis Islands GC	OD	1926	Tampa	Florida	United States	9 holes, demolished in 1950s for housing
Druid Hills	R	1935	Atlanta	Georgia	United States	
Ingleside CC	OD		Atlanta	Georgia	United States	9 holes
Idle Hour C	E	1935	Macon	Georgia	United States	
Aurora Country Club	R	1935	Aurora	Illinois	United States	
Ridgemoor CC	R	1913	Norwood Park Township	Illinois	United States	
River Foresrt CC	R	1935	Elmhurst	Illinois	United States	
Glen Oak CC			Glen Ellyn	Illinois	United States	
Bryn Mawr	R	1935	Lincolnwood	Illinois	United States	
Medinah CC, Number 3	R	1936	Medinah	Illinois	United States	
Green Acres CC		1924	Northbrook	Illinois	United States	formerly Illinois GC
Westgate Valley CC, West Course	R	1936	Palos Heights	Illinois	United States	
Westmoreland CC	R/A		Wilmette	Illinois	United States	
Cedar Rapids CC	E	1936	Cedar Rapids	Iowa	United States	
Clinton CC	R	1937	Clinton	Iowa	United States	Closed 2008
Indian Hills CC	OD	1925	Mission Hills	Kansas	United States	
Kansas City CC	OD	1925	Mission Hills	Kansas	United States	
Louisville CC	E	1937	Louisville	Kentucky	United States	
Cherokee GC	E		Louisville	Kentucky	United States	
Crescent Hill GC	E		Louisville	Kentucky	United States	
Seneca GC	E	1937	Louisville	Kentucky	United States	
Shawnee GC	E	1937	Louisville	Kentucky	United States	
Shreveport CC	E	1936	Shreveport	Louisiana	United States	Closed
Bridgton-Highlands CC	OD	1926	Bridgton	Maine	United States	9 holes
Baltimore CC, Five Farms East	OD	1926	Baltimore	Maryland	United States	
Suburban CC	RD	1917	Pikesville	Maryland	United States	
Framingham CC	E	1937	Framingham	Massachusetts	United States	
Berkshire Hills CC	OD	1925	Pittsfield	Massachusetts	United States	
Pontousuk Lake CC	R	1936	Pittsfield	Massachusetts	United States	
Sankaty Head GC	R		Siasconset	Massachusetts	United States	
Worcester CC	E	1936	Worcester	Massachusetts	United States	
Oakland Hills Country Club	E	1936	Bloomfield Hills	Michigan	United States	
Meadowbrook CC	E	1936	Northville	Michigan	United States	
Pine Lake CC	R	1936	Orchard Lake Village	Michigan	United States	
Sauganash CC	E	1924	Three Rivers	Michigan	United States	
Golden Valley CC	OD	1926	Golden Valley	Minnesota	United States	
Edina CC	R	1936	Minneapolis	Minnesota	United States	formerly CC of Minneapolis
Rochester G&CC	OD	1916	Rochester	Minnesota	United States	original 9 hole course redesigned in 1926 as a new 18 hole course. The cost was his traveling expenses to Rochester where his daughter Elsie Mae Brown resided. Course done as a wedding gift.
Hillcrest GC	R	1937	St. Paul	Minnesota	United States	Extinct
Town & Country CC	R	1937	St. Paul	Minnesota	United States	
Westwood CC	E	1937	Clayton	Missouri	United States	
Swope Memorial GC	OD	1934	Kansas City	Missouri	United States	
St. Joseph CC	R	1936	St. Joseph	Missouri	United States	
Green Briar CC	R	1937	St. Louis	Missouri	United States	
Omaha CC	R	1936	Omaha	Nebraska	United States	
Seaview GC, Bay Course	E		Absecon	New Jersey	United States	
Alpine CC	OD	1931	Alpine	New Jersey	United States	
Beacon Hill CC	E	1899	Atlantic Highlands	New Jersey	United States	then-named Atlantic Highlands GC
Somerset Hills CC	OD	1917	Bernardsville	New Jersey	United States	
Forest Hill FC	OD	1926	Bloomfield	New Jersey	United States	
Mount Pleasant CC	OD		Browns Mills	New Jersey	United States	
Pine Valley GC	Composite	1918	Clementon	New Jersey	United States	
Upper Montclair CC	OD	1920 & 1930	Clifton	New Jersey	United States	27 Holes
Cranford CC	E		Cranford	New Jersey	United States	
Deal CC	E		Deal	New Jersey	United States	
Hollywood CC	E		Ocean	New Jersey	United States	
Myosotis CC	OD		Eatontown	New Jersey	United States	Extinct
Old Orchard CC	OD		Eatontown	New Jersey	United States	
Suneagles GC at Fort Monmouth	OD	1925	Eatontown	New Jersey	United States	
Essex Fells CC	R	1936	Essex Fells	New Jersey	United States	
Glen Ridge CC	R	1923	Glen Ridge	New Jersey	United States	
White Beeches CC	R	1936	Haworth	New Jersey	United States	
Norwood CC	OD		Long Branch	New Jersey	United States	Extinct
Montclair GC	E		Montclair	New Jersey	United States	
Jumping Brook CC	OD		Neptune	New Jersey	United States	
Hackensack GC	R		Oradell	New Jersey	United States	
Ridgewood CC	OD	1929	Paramus	New Jersey	United States	27 holes
East Orange GC	R	1936	Short Hills	New Jersey	United States	
Shackamaxon CC	OD	1916	Scotch Plains	New Jersey	United States	
Spring Lake GC	R		Spring Lake	New Jersey	United States	
Baltusrol GC, Lower Course	OD	1922	Springfield	New Jersey	United States	
Baltusrol GC, Upper Course	OD	1922	Springfield	New Jersey	United States	
Trenton CC	E		Trenton	New Jersey	United States	
Oak Ridge CC	E		Tuckahoe	New Jersey	United States	
Suburban Golf Club	OD	1922	Union	New Jersey	United States	
North Jersey CC	E		Wayne	New Jersey	United States	
Essex County CC	OD	1918	West Orange	New Jersey	United States	Seven Tillinghast designed holes were retained by Seth Raynor when he designed the current course in 1925.
Francis Byrne GC	Composite		West Orange	New Jersey	United States	
Mountain Ridge CC	OD		West Orange	New Jersey	United States	9 holes, Extinct
Echo Lake CC	E	1936	Westfield	New Jersey	United States	
Wolferts Roost CC	R/A	1915	Albany	New York	United States	Reconstructed original nine and added a new nine.
Highland Park GC	R/A	1935	Auburn	New York	United States	
Milburn CC	R/A		Baldwin	New York	United States	Extinct
Southward Ho CC	OD	1923	Bay Shore	New York	United States	
Briar Hall G&CC	R	1936	Briarcliff Manor	New York	United States	
Siwanoy CC	R	1936	Bronxville	New York	United States	
Rockaway HC	OD	1925	Cedarhurst	New York	United States	
Elmira CC	R/A	1922	Elmira	New York	United States	
Fairview CC	R/A	1936	Elmsford	New York	United States	Extinct
Knollwood CC	OD	1925	Elmsford	New York	United States	
Binghamton CC	OD	1922	Endwell	New York	United States	
Bethpage State Park, Black Course	E	1935	Farmingdale	New York	United States	
Bethpage State Park, Blue Course	Composite	1935	Farmingdale	New York	United States	
Bethpage State Park, Green Course	R	1935	Farmingdale	New York	United States	
Bethpage State Park, Red Course	E	1935	Farmingdale	New York	United States	
Bethpage State Park, Yellow Course	Composite	1935	Farmingdale	New York	United States	
Fresh Meadow CC			Flushing	New York	United States	
North Shore CC	OD	1917	Glen Head	New York	United States	Incorrectly attributed to Tillinghast; actually a Raynor design
Scarsdale GC	OD	1923	Hartsdale	New York	United States	
Hempstead GC	R/A	1923	Hempstead	New York	United States	
Rainey Estate GC, Lilliput	OD		Huntington	New York	United States	
CC Club of Ithaca	OD		Ithaca	New York	United States	Extinct
Jackson Heights CC, Lilliput			Jackson Heights	New York	United States	Extinct
Lafayette CC	OD		Jamesville	New York	United States	Extinct
Kingston GC	OD		Kingston	New York	United States	9 holes
Bonnie Briar CC	R/A	1923	Larchmont	New York	United States	
Harmon CC	OD		Lebanon	New York	United States	9 holes
Niagara Falls CC	R/A	1918	Lewiston	New York	United States	
Grossinger GC	R	1936	Liberty	New York	United States	
Loon Lake GC	E		Loon Lake	New York	United States	
Winged Foot GC, East Course	OD	1923	Mamaroneck	New York	United States	
Winged Foot GC, West Course	OD	1923	Mamaroneck	New York	United States	
Mount Kisco CC	R/A	1920	Mount Kisco	New York	United States	
Bailey Park CC	OD		Mt. Vernon	New York	United States	
Paramount Country Club	OD	1923	New City	New York	United States	
Wykagyl CC	R/A	1931	New Rochelle	New York	United States	
Powelton C	R	1936	Newburgh	New York	United States	
Oswego CC	OD		Oswego	New York	United States	9 holes
Bluff Point G&CC	OD		Plattsburgh	New York	United States	
Pleasantville CC	OD	1917	Pleasantville	New York	United States	9 holes
Port Jervis CC	OD	1921	Port Jervis	New York	United States	9 holes
North Hempstead CC	R/A	1916	Flower Hill	New York	United States	Design altered in 1956 by Robert Trent Jones. The course was restored to the original Tillinghast design in 1994; the restoration project was completed in 1996.
Old Oaks CC	OD	1925	Purchase	New York	United States	
Genesee Valley	R	1935	Rochester	New York	United States	
Irondequoit CC	R	1935	Rochester	New York	United States	
Sands Point GC	OD	1928	Sands Point	New York	United States	
Island Hills GC	OD		Sayville	New York	United States	Idle. Course purchased by Rechler Development for condo development. Local residents are fighting to keep the current zoning. Help save Island Hills!
Sleepy Hollow CC	R/A	1928	Scarborough	New York	United States	
Fenway GC	OD	1924	Scarsdale	New York	United States	
Quaker Ridge GC	OD	1918	Scarsdale	New York	United States	
Saxon Woods GC	OD	1930	Scarsdale	New York	United States	
Seneca Falls CC	OD	1925	Seneca Falls	New York	United States	Original 9 Holes
Highland Park Golf Club	OD	1925	Auburn	New York	United States	Original 9 Holes
Sunningdale CC	R/A		Scarsdale	New York	United States	
Drumlins CC	R	1935	Syracuse	New York	United States	
Rockwood Hall CC			Mount Pleasant	New York	United States	Extinct
Meadow Brook HC	R/A		Westbury	New York	United States	Extinct
Century CC	E		White Plains	New York	United States	
Elmwood CC	OD	1920	White Plains	New York	United States	
Metropolis CC	R/A	1929	White Plains	New York	United States	
Dunwoodie CC	E		Yonkers	New York	United States	
Hudson River CC	E		Yonkers	New York	United States	Extinct
Myers Park CC	OD		Charlotte	North Carolina	United States	9 holes
Carolina CC	R	1936	Raleigh	North Carolina	United States	
Forsyth CC	R/A		Winston-Salem	North Carolina	United States	
Firestone CC	E	1936	Akron	Ohio	United States	
Portage CC	R	1936	Akron	Ohio	United States	
Chagrin Valley CC	E	1936	Chagrin Falls	Ohio	United States	
Canterbury CC	E	1936	Cleveland	Ohio	United States	
Acacia CC	R	1936	Lyndhurst	Ohio	United States	Extinct
Mayfield CC	R	1936	South Euclid	Ohio	United States	
Inverness Club	R		Toledo	Ohio	United States	
Lakewood CC	OD	1921	Westlake	Ohio	United States	
Manakiki CC	R	1936	Willoughby Hills	Ohio	United States	
Oklahoma City CC	R		Oklahoma City	Oklahoma	United States	
Conoco GC	R	1936	Ponca City	Oklahoma	United States	
Oaks CC	OD	1921	Tulsa	Oklahoma	United States	formerly Oakhurst CC
Tulsa CC	OD	1919	Tulsa	Oklahoma	United States	
Waverly CC	E	1936	Portland	Oregon	United States	
Nemacolin CC	R/A		Beallsville	Pennsylvania	United States	
Bedford Springs GC			Bedford	Pennsylvania	United States	
Melrose CC	R/A	1935	Cheltenham	Pennsylvania	United States	Closed 12/1/2024
Valley CC	R/A		Conyngham	Pennsylvania	United States	
Irem Temple CC	OD	1927	Dallas	Pennsylvania	United States	
Aronimink GC	OD	1915	Drexel Hill	Pennsylvania	United States	Extinct
Erie GC	OD	1926	Erie	Pennsylvania	United States	
Fox Hill CC	R/A		Exeter	Pennsylvania	United States	
Abington Club	R/A		Jenkintown	Pennsylvania	United States	formerly Old York Road CC
Sunnehanna CC	OD	1923	Johnstown	Pennsylvania	United States	
Avalon Field Club at New Castle	OD	1923	New Castle	Pennsylvania	United States	
Philadelphia Cricket Club	OD	1922	Philadelphia	Pennsylvania	United States	
Cedarbrook Hill	OD		Philadelphia	Pennsylvania	United States	formerly Cedarbrook CC
Philmont CC	E		Philadelphia	Pennsylvania	United States	
Stenton FC	R/A		Philadelphia	Pennsylvania	United States	
Pittsburgh FC	R/A		Pittsburgh	Pennsylvania	United States	
Wanango CC	R/A		Reno	Pennsylvania	United States	
Abington Hills CC	OD		Scranton	Pennsylvania	United States	Extinct
Waverly CC	E		Scranton	Pennsylvania	United States	Extinct
Poxono CC	OD		East Stroudsburg	Pennsylvania	United States	Extinct
Shawnee CC	OD	1911	East Stroudsburg	Pennsylvania	United States	
St. Davids Golf Club	R		Wayne	Pennsylvania	United States	
Galen Hall CC	R/A		Wernersville	Pennsylvania	United States	
Wyoming Valley CC	OD	1896	Wilkes-Barre	Pennsylvania	United States	
Williamsport CC	R/A		Williamsport	Pennsylvania	United States	
York CC	E		York	Pennsylvania	United States	
Beavertail CC	OD	1925	Jamestown	Rhode Island	United States	Extinct
Point Judith CC	E		Narragansett Pier	Rhode Island	United States	
Newport CC	OD		Newport	Rhode Island	United States	
Pawtucket GC	R	1936	Pawtucket	Rhode Island	United States	
Rock Hill CC	OD		Rock Hill	South Carolina	United States	9 holes
Johnson City CC	OD	1921	Johnson City	Tennessee	United States	
Kingsport CC	OD	1919	Kingsport	Tennessee	United States	Extinct
Memphis CC	E	1937	Memphis	Tennessee	United States	
Austin CC	R	1936	Austin	Texas	United States	
Corsicana CC	R		Corsicana	Texas	United States	
Cedar Crest GC	R/A		Dallas	Texas	United States	
Bob-O-Links	R/A	1936	Dallas	Texas	United States	Closed 1973
Brook Hollow Golf Club	OD	1924	Dallas	Texas	United States	
Dallas CC	R/A		Dallas	Texas	United States	
Lakewood CC	R/A		Dallas	Texas	United States	
Fort Sam Houston GC, La Oma Course	OD		Fort Sam Houston	Texas	United States	27 holes
Colonial CC	E	1936	Fort Worth	Texas	United States	
Fort Worth CC	R/A	1920	Fort Worth	Texas	United States	
Ridglea CC	R	1936	Fort Worth	Texas	United States	
Gus Wortham GC	R	1936	Houston	Texas	United States	formerly Houston CC
River Oaks CC	R	1936	Houston	Texas	United States	
Brackenridge Park GC	OD	1916	San Antonio	Texas	United States	
Oak Hills CC	OD		San Antonio	Texas	United States	formerly Alamo CC
San Antonio CC	E		San Antonio	Texas	United States	
Ogden CC	R	1936	Ogden	Utah	United States	
Fort Douglas C	R	1936	Salt Lake City	Utah	United States	
Marble Island GC	OD		Colchester	Vermont	United States	
Belmont Park GC	OD	1918	Richmond	Virginia	United States	formerly Hermitage CC
Roanoke CC	R/A		Roanoke	Virginia	United States	
Inglewood CC	R	1936	Kenmore	Washington	United States	
Seattle GC	R	1936	Seattle	Washington	United States	
Fircrest GC	R	1936	Tacoma	Washington	United States	
Walla Walla CC	A	1936	Walla Walla	Washington	United States	Complete evaluation changed greens
Blackhawk CC	R		Madison	Wisconsin	United States	
Maple Bluff CC	R	1935	Madison	Wisconsin	United States	
Nakoma CC	R/A	1936	Madison	Wisconsin	United States	
North Hills CC	R	1935	Menomonee Falls	Wisconsin	United States	
Scarboro G &CC	R/A	1926	Toronto	Ontario	Canada	
Anglo-American C	OD		Lac de L'Achigan	Quebec	Canada	Never completed
Dorval Municipal GC	OD		Montreal	Quebec	Canada	formerly Elm Ridge CC - 9 holes
