= Warren Smith (golfer) =

American golfer

Warren F. Smith, Jr. (October 20, 1915 – May 3, 2015) was an American professional golfer.

== Early life and amateur career ==
Smith was born in Escanaba, Michigan. His family moved to Gadsden, Alabama where he started playing golf at the age of 11. He won his first match at 16, set a new amateur record of 31 at the Gadsden Country Club at 18, and won the 25th annual Beauvoir Country Club Invitational in Montgomery, Alabama at 19.

In 1945, he served three months in the U.S. Merchant Marine, delivering troop supplies to Naples, Italy.

== Professional career ==
Smith returned to the U.S. and served as head pro at Seiberling Country Club in Akron, Ohio while working for Goodyear Tire and Rubber Company. One year later, he became the first head pro at the newly opened Oak Hills Country Club in San Antonio, Texas.

Smith was known for his long tee shots and accurate iron game. His greatest golf achievement came in 1955 during the Texas Open, when he hit seven birdies in a row—a record for a PGA event—at Brackenridge Park Golf Course in San Antonio. The record stood until 1961 when Bob Goalby scored eight birdies in a row during the St. Petersburg Open.

Smith was instrumental in luring the Texas Open to Oak Hills, where it was played from 1961 to 1966. He played often with Dow Finsterwald and Arnold Palmer, who won the Texas Open in 1960, 1961 and 1962. Smith launched Oak Hills' Junior Program, which turned out four all-city champions, and he mentored several young golfers, including Joe Conrad, who won the British Amateur in 1955. He also coached the Trinity University golf team in its 1952 victory over golf powerhouse North Texas State University, the latter school's only loss from 1949 to 1952 when it won four NCAA golf championships.

Smith was appointed head pro at Cherry Hills Country Club in Englewood, Colorado in 1963. He was named the PGA Golf Professional of the Year in 1973 and was awarded a red jacket and honorary lifetime membership from the club—a distinction that, at the time, had been conferred upon only President Dwight D. Eisenhower and Arnold Palmer.

Smith played in two PGA Championships, going to the quarterfinals of match play in 1957. He played in the 1966 U.S. Open and was second in the 1965 Colorado Open. He shot his age at 66 and every year until he retired from the game in 2003 at the age of 87. He scored seven holes-in-one and three double eagles. During his tenure at Cherry Hills, Smith mentored 16 assistant professionals who went on to become head professionals at country clubs in Houston, Dallas, Phoenix, New Orleans, Denver, Vail, and elsewhere.

Late in his career, Smith was president of the Central Texas PGA Section for three terms and the Colorado PGA Section for five terms.

== Personal life ==
Smith lived in Denver, Colorado until 2013, when he moved to Phoenix, Arizona. He died on May 3, 2015, at the age of 99. His son Warren W. Smith is president of Pine Canyon, a golf course community in Flagstaff, Arizona. In January 2009, Outskirts Press published a book about Smith's career.

== Awards and honors ==
- In 1978, Smith was inducted into the Colorado Golf Hall of Fame.
- Smith is the namesake for the Colorado Section's lifetime achievement award. In addition, he was its first recipient of the award in 1986.
- In 2005, Smith was named to the PGA Golf Professional Hall of Fame.
- In 2005, Oak Hills named a Junior Golfer Scholarship after him.

== See also ==
- Warren Smith Scholarship.
