= Cavalcade of Golf =

Golf tournament formerly on the PGA Tour

The Cavalcade Of Golf was a PGA Tour event that was played at the Shackamaxon Country Club in Scotch Plains, New Jersey. It was played for only a single year – 1955.

The tournament was won by Cary Middlecoff by two strokes over Sam Snead. It was Middlecoff's sixth and last victory of a career year that also included wins at the Masters and Western Open.

The purse was the richest ever offered at the time for a PGA Tour event held east of Chicago, and the second largest purse the pros would play for that year. The purse was $50,000 with $10,000 as the winner's share.

The course was designed by A. W. Tillinghast and opened in September 1916.

== Winner ==
- 1955 Cary Middlecoff
