= North Hempstead Country Club =

Private golf and country club in Flower Hill, New York

- NHCC
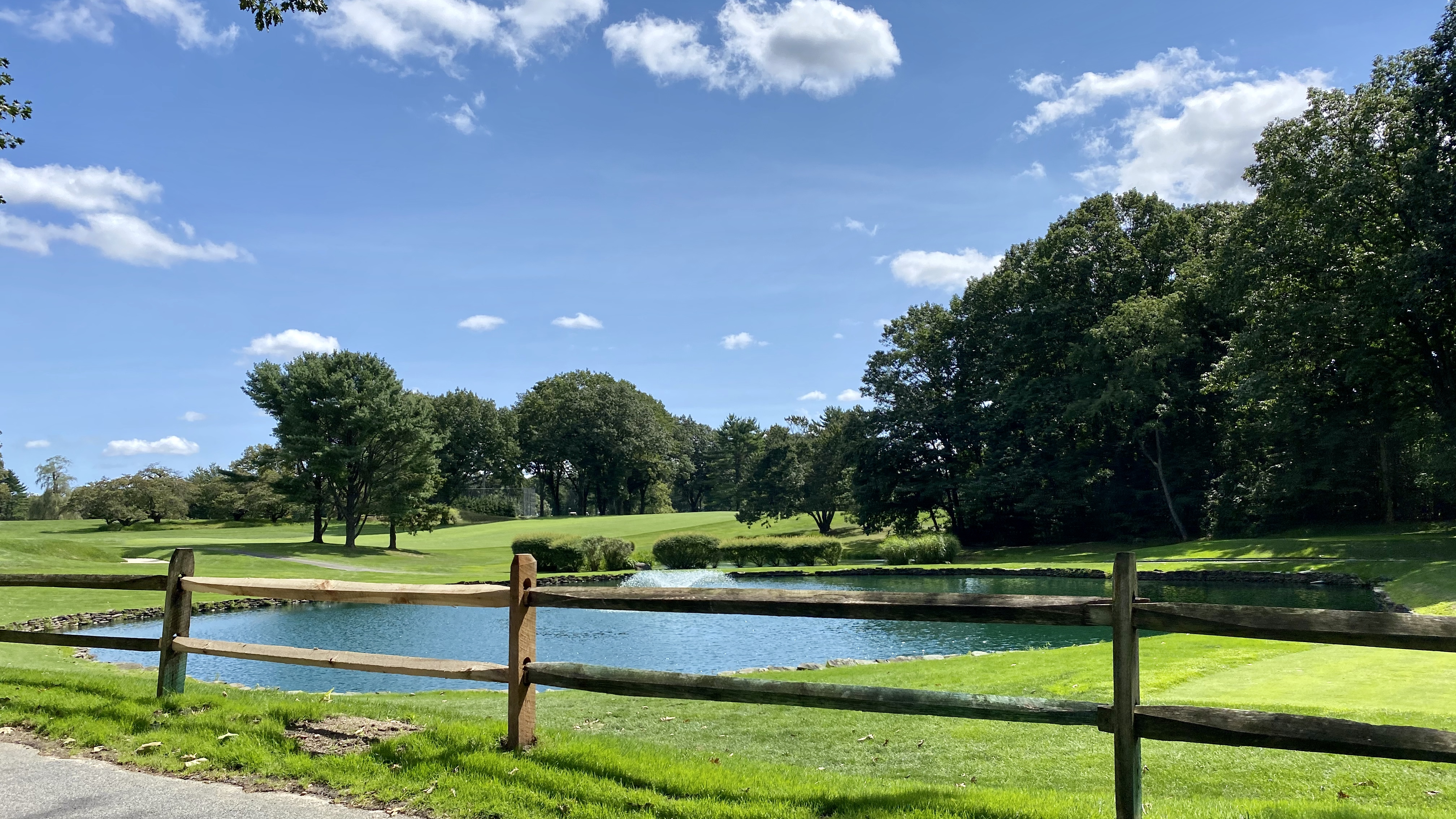
- One of the water hazards at the North Hempstead Country Club, seen in 2020
- Interactive map of North Hempstead Country Club
- Type: Private country club
- Location: 291 Port Washington Boulevard, Port Washington, NY 11050; Flower Hill, New York
- Coordinates: 40°48′51″N 73°40′34″W
- Area: ≥150 acres (61 ha)
- Established: 1916
- Designer: A.W. Tillinghast (golf course); Clifford C. Wendehack (clubhouse)
- Parking: Yes
- Website: https://www.nhccli.com/

The North Hempstead Country Club (NHCC) is a private country club located within the Incorporated Village of Flower Hill in Nassau County, on the North Shore of Long Island, in New York, United States.

== Description ==
The North Hempstead Country Club is located off of Port Washington Boulevard (NY 101), and features an 18-hole, 70-par golf course designed by A.W. Tillinghast, with many trees and water hazards. The NHCC also features a card room, a pool, tennis courts, and dining facilities. The countrified manor style clubhouse was designed by renowned architect Clifford C. Wendehack.

Many homes on Country Club Drive in the Port Washington section of Flower Hill border the North Hempstead Country Club. Built by Walter Uhl in the 1930s and 1940s, they were among the early suburban homes built within the Village of Flower Hill.

The North Hempstead Country Club celebrated its centennial in 2016.

== History ==
The North Hempstead Country Club's clubhouse in 2025

The North Hempstead Country Club opened in 1916, partially over the former Burtis Farm. The club purchased the more than 150 acre (61 ha) property on September 7, 1918, for an estimated price of $150,000 to $200,000 (1918 USD).

In 1956, the golf course's design was altered, as some of the easternmost portions of the property were returned to the local sand mining operations that took place nearby at the time. Holes 11–13, 16, and 17 were altered; this reconfiguration was designed by Robert Trent Jones. Following the end of sand mining operations in the area, the golf course's original, A.W. Tillinghast design was restored in a subsequent renovation project between 1994 and 1996.

=== 1968 plane crash ===
On March 20, 1968, a small plane, piloted by Reuven Jerzy and carrying Leonard Caplan as a passenger, suffered an engine failure over Manhasset Bay while they were practicing stalls. They made an emergency landing on the North Hempstead Country Club's golf course, avoiding a group of golfers.

The plane, which was owned by Speed's Flying Service, was dragged off of the fairway, and nobody was hurt in the incident.

=== 1979 discrimination lawsuit ===
In September 1979, the North Hempstead Country Club expelled club member William Kirkendale after he critiqued their admissions policy, which barred Black and Jewish people from becoming members of the club. Later that year, Kirkendale filed a $1.25 million (1979 USD) lawsuit against the club. It was one of the first cases in which a white Christian sued a country club for barring and discriminating against Black and Jewish people. He argued that the club discriminated against minorities, and that the NHCC violated his civil rights by expelling him when he voiced his concern regarding said policy.

The New York State Supreme Court ultimately sided with the club, concluding that a private club can admit whomever they want.

=== 2018 expansion ===
In 2018, the North Hempstead Country Club carried out a golf course expansion project. This project saw the country club purchase and raze an adjacent residence for the construction of a new driving range. Historical features from the house were removed prior to the demolition, and were reused and preserved in the community.

== See also ==
- List of golf courses designed by A.W. Tillinghast
- Fresh Meadow Country Club
- Garden City Golf Club
- North Hills Country Club
- Village Club of Sands Point
