= Charles Vachris =

American civil engineer and politician (1939–2014)

Charles Francis Vachris

Trustee of Flower Hill, New York
- In office 1988–1990

Personal details
- Born: February 19, 1939 Brooklyn, New York, United States
- Died: October 7, 2014 (aged 75) Munsey Park School, Munsey Park, New York, United States
- Resting place: Nassau Knolls Cemetery, Port Washington, New York, United States
- Spouse: Evelyn Gay Kreutzer (m. 1961)
- Children: 5
- Education: Chaminade High School
- Alma mater: Yale University; Columbia University
- Occupation: Civil engineer; politician

Military service
- Branch/service: United States Army Corps of Engineers
- Rank: Captain

Charles ("Charlie") Francis Vachris (February 19, 1939 – October 7, 2014) was an American civil engineer and politician, and was the founder and head of Vachris Engineering, PC.

== Life and career ==
=== Early life and education ===
Vachris was born in Brooklyn, New York, on February 19, 1939.

For high school, Vachris attended Chaminade High School in Mineola, New York, which he graduated from in 1957. It was there where he met his wife, Evelyn Gaye Vachris (born Kruetzer). In high school, Vachris played on his school's football team.

For college, he attended Yale University's honors college as an engineering major and graduated in 1961; Vachris also played on the school's basketball team. For his masters, Vachris went to Columbia University and earned his masters in Engineering in 1968.

=== Military service ===
Vachris served in the Army Corps of Engineers and was stationed at Fort Knox. He was honorably discharged from the military as a Captain.

=== Career ===
==== Vachris Engineering ====
Vachris founded and headed Garden City-based Vachris Engineering, PC in 1982. Before founding the firm, he had worked in a construction company owned by his family.

In 2014, Vachris voluntarily donated personal and corporate services for the engineering of a new basketball court at the Flower Hill Village Park.

==== Political career ====
As a resident of the village of Flower Hill, New York, Vachris served as a village trustee from 1988 to 1990, and also served on its planning board and ethics board until his passing.

Vachris also served as Flower Hill's village engineer for many years.

== Death and legacy ==
Vachris died of a heart attack at the age of 75 on October 7, 2014, while playing basketball at the Munsey Park Elementary School in Munsey Park, New York. He is buried at Nassau Knolls Cemetery in Port Washington, New York.

The basketball court at the Flower Hill Village Park is dedicated to Vachris.

== Personal life ==
At the time of his death, Vachris had lived in Flower Hill for roughly 45 years, and resided at the family's home at 42 Dogwood Lane. He married Evelyn Gay Kreutzer in 1961. The couple had 5 children and 11 grandchildren.

Vachris was an avid fan and player of basketball, and would play the game until his death.
