= San Francisco Golf Club =

Athletic and social club in San Francisco, California

Coordinates: 37.712°N 122.477°W

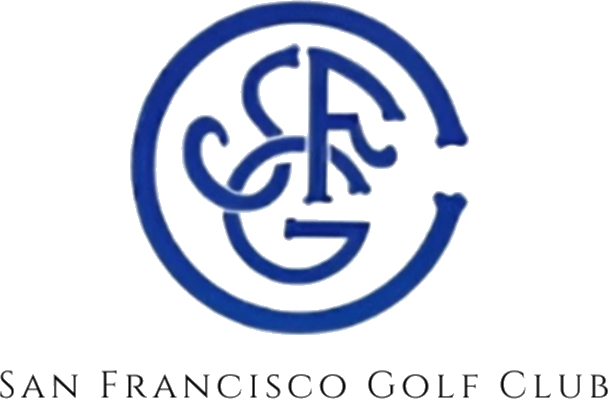
- Interactive map of San Francisco Golf Club

Club information
- Location: San Francisco
- Established: 1895
- Type: Private
- Tota holes: 18
- Designed by: A.W. Tillinghast
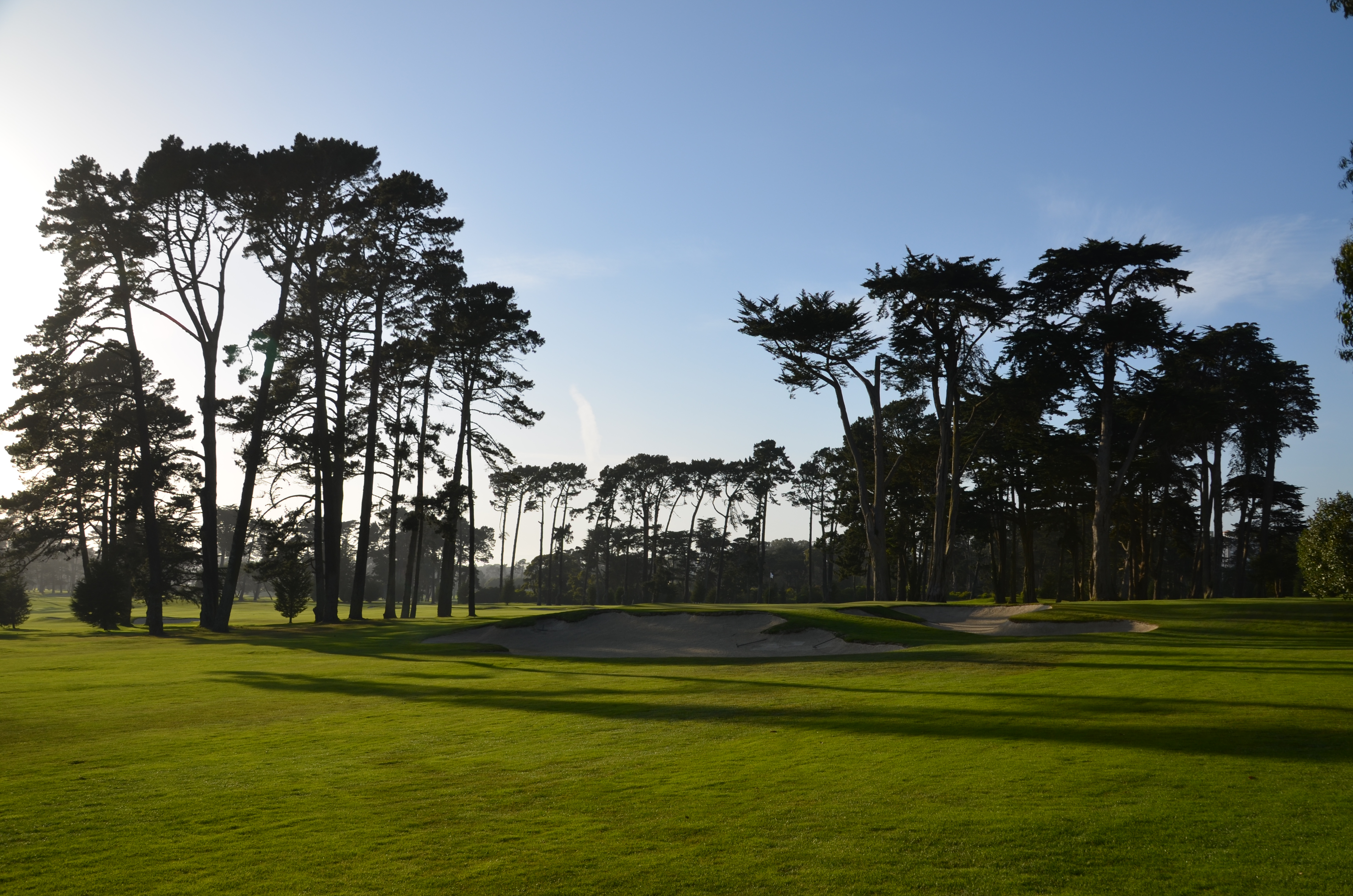
- The approach to the fourteenth green in 2014.

San Francisco Golf Club is an athletic club and private social club in San Francisco, California, It is one of the most exclusive private membership clubs in the United States. In Golfdigest's 2015-2016 ranking of America's best golf courses, San Francisco Golf Club secured the 35th best course.

== History ==
San Francisco Golf Club was one of seven golf clubs West of the Allegheny Mountains when it was founded in 1895. It had its beginning at the Presidio of San Francisco as a nine-hole course. It was moved to 19th and Ocean streets in 1904 and to its present location in 1915.

The course was designed by noted American golf course architect A.W. Tillinghast. The course's signature 7th hole overlooks the site of the final legal duel in California.

San Francisco is one of five golf clubs that participates in an annual rotating-venue members-only golf tournament known as SCAPS; the other clubs are Seminole Golf Club, Cypress Point Club, Pine Valley Golf Club, and Augusta National Golf Club.

== Notable members ==
- Charles R. Schwab
- Condoleezza Rice

== See also ==
- List of golf courses designed by A. W. Tillinghast
- List of American gentlemen's clubs
