= Suburban Golf Club =

Private country club in Union Township, New Jersey

Coordinates: 40.691481°N 74.258128°W

- Interactive map of Suburban Golf Club

Club information
- Location: 1730 Morris Avenue, Union Township, New Jersey 07083, USA
- Established: 1896
- Type: Private
- Total holes: 18
- Tournaments: 2026 NJ State Senior Open; 2023 MGA Metropolitan Open Qualifier; 2022 NJ PGA Senior Open Championship; 2021 US Women’s Mid-Amateur Qualifier; 2018 US Senior Open Sectional Qualifier; 2017 NJ Senior PGA Championship; 1937, 1938, 1943 NJ PGA Championship; Suburban Cup; NJ State Open; NJ State Amateur; MGA Open Qualifier
- Website: www.suburbangolfclub.com
- Designed by: A. W. Tillinghast 1922, Restoration Ron Prichard 1999
- Par: 71
- Length: 6,525
- Course rating: 72.7
- Slope rating: 137
- Course record: 63

Suburban Golf Club is a private country club in Union Township, New Jersey, founded in 1896. It features an 18-hole golf course designed by famed course architect A. W. Tillinghast in 1922. Tom Bendelow designed the predecessor 9-hole course in 1896. In 1999, Ron Prichard completed a full restoration.

Suburban Golf Club, Inc. is a non-profit corporation of approximately 230 golf members. The club is situated near the intersection of the Garden State Parkway, U.S. Route 22, and New Jersey Route 82 and is approximately 15 miles from Times Square in New York City. The elevation of the Club House is 80 feet above sea level. It is adjacent to the hummocks, a natural water basin and source for the Elizabeth River. Its entrance is on Morris Avenue, which historically is the main road from Elizabeth to Morristown.

The club has adopted a monogram which depicts its age, having originated in 1896, and its location in the metropolitan area and particularly Northern New Jersey.

On March 18, 1896, a group of male residents of Elizabeth met, associated themselves, and formed what was then known as the Suburban Club of Elizabeth, New Jersey. The club was founded on March 23, 1896, when a Certificate of Incorporation of the Suburban Club of Elizabeth, New Jersey, was filed with the Union County Clerk.

The present course layout was designed in 1922. The course is characterized by narrow tree-lined fairways and small, well bunkered greens. Many stately indigenous trees surround the course including many types of oak, maple, elm and evergreens. Several flowering and ornamental trees are observed in the spring. The 18 holes are 6,525 yards in length, with nines of 3,362 and 3,163 yards. Par is established at 71 with nines of 36 and 35. The club has been host to many major State tournaments. The course record is 63, held by PGA Tour player Ryan McCormick.

From 1999 to 2001, the most extensive renovation in the club's history was undertaken. Two million dollars in funds were approved by the general membership for on course renovations. Golf course architect Ron Prichard was commissioned to create and implement the Master Plan. Hundreds of trees were removed, 82 bunkers on the course were rebuilt, the fourteenth green was redesigned and built to United States Golf Association specifications, many fairways were reshaped/expanded, a complete new irrigation system and pumps were installed. Approximately 200 yards were added to the length of the course.
