= Nassau Knolls Cemetery =

Cemetery in Port Washington, New York

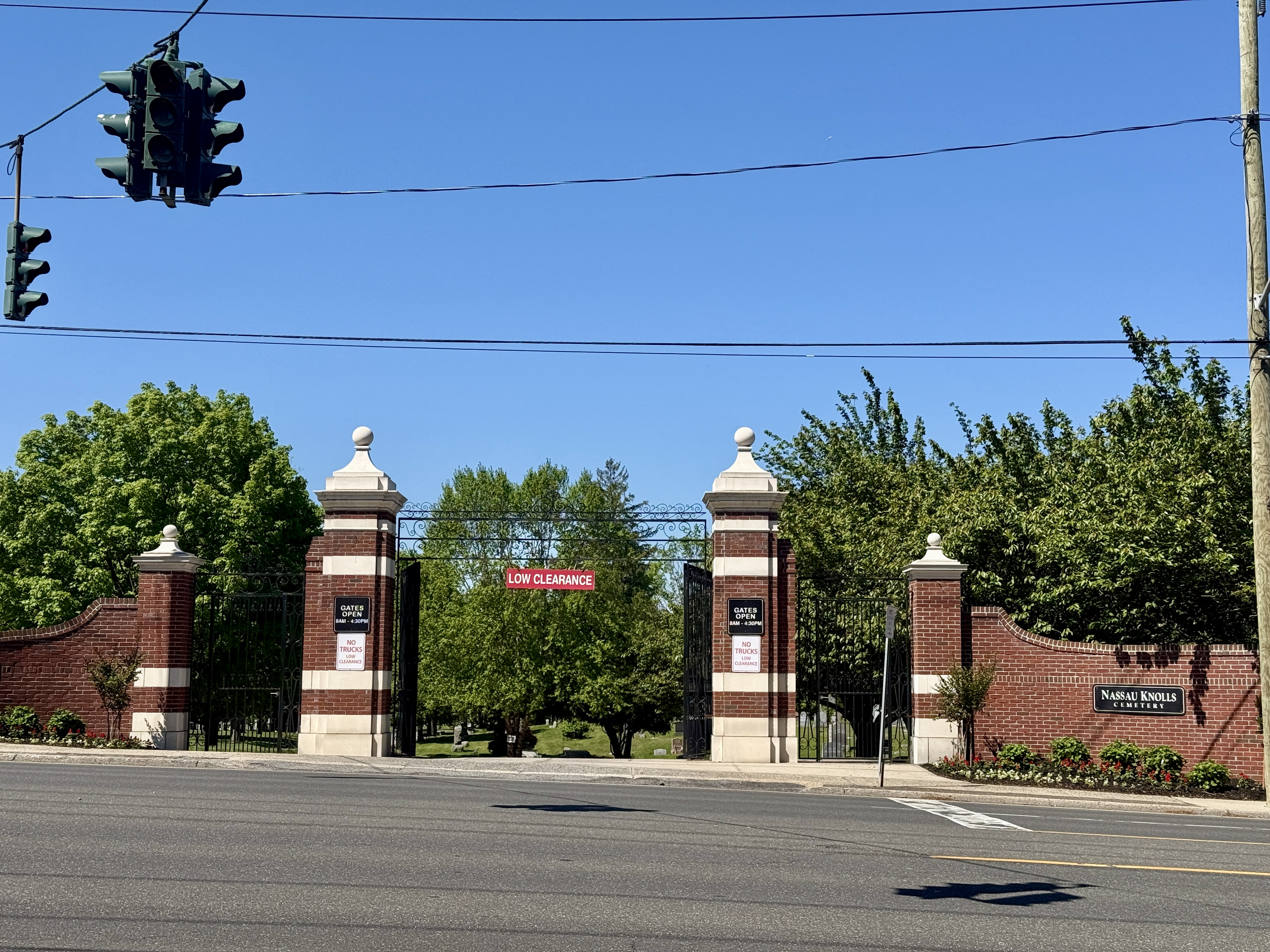
- The main entrance to the cemetery in 2026
- Interactive map of Nassau Knolls Cemetery

Details
- Established: 1900
- Location: 500 Port Washington Boulevard, Port Washington, New York, US
- Coordinates: 40°49′21″N 73°40′58″W
- Type: Non-profit
- Owned by: Nassau Cemetery Association
- Size: ≤40 acres (≤16 ha)
- Website: www.nassauknollscemetery.org
- Find a Grave: Nassau Knolls Cemetery

Nassau Knolls Cemetery (also known as Knolls Cemetery and Nassau Knolls Memorial Park) is a cemetery and memorial park located within Port Washington, in the Town of North Hempstead, in Nassau County, on the North Shore of Long Island, in New York, United States.

== History ==
The Nassau Knolls Cemetery was founded in April 1900 by the Lewis family – a prominent Port Washington family, with the current memorial park being formed in the 1930s. It is the burial place for many prominent locals.

In 1940, the cemetery's bell tower opened. The tower's 18 bells were manufactured in nearby Roslyn.

In 1946, the cemetery made newspaper headlines when it was searched by police, after reports were made that the suspect in the Logan Murder had fled onto the property. After a thorough search, the suspect was not found in the cemetery, and investigators shifted to search a nearby wooded area.

In the 2010s, the cemetery's bell tower received extensive renovations after years of neglect, reopening in 2018.

On March 22, 2021, Nassau Knolls received approval from the Nassau County Legislature to purchase additional, adjacent property on Beechwood Avenue to expand the cemetery. The purchase was made due to the cemetery running out of existing space.

== Notable interments ==
- Alexander Bruce Bielaski – Second director of Bureau of Investigation (now the FBI).
- Walter Uhl – Long Island builder and real estate developer.
- William Guggenheim Jr. – Member of the Guggenheim Family.
- Hartford N. Gunn, Jr. – Founding President of PBS; son of North Hempstead Town Supervisor Hartford N. Gunn, Sr.
- Jennifer Levin – Teenage murder victim; murdered in Central Park by Robert Chambers.
- Charles Vachris – Engineer and politician.

== See also ==
- Flower Hill Cemetery
- Monfort Cemetery
