= Walter Uhl =

American builder in New York (c. 1903–1984)

Walter G. Uhl
- Born: c. 1903
- Died: December 7, 1984 (aged 81); St. Luke's Hospital, Manhattan
- Burial place: Nassau Knolls Cemetery, Port Washington, New York
- Occupations: Builder; developer
- Years active: 1930s–1984
- Known for: Flower Hill Building Corporation; Flower Hill Estates subdivision of Flower Hill, New York
- Title: Head, Flower Hill Building Corporation
- Successor: Thomas Uhl
- Spouses: Frances (died 1957): Louise
- Children: 2

Walter Uhl was a major 20th century builder on Long Island, in New York, and was the founder of the Flower Hill Building Corporation. He is especially well known for his work in Flower Hill, New York.

== Early life ==
Walter Uhl was born ca. 1903.

== Career ==
Uhl started his building career in the 1930s. One of his earliest projects was the purchase of 27 lots in Manhasset Bay Estates in Port Washington, New York, which he would build homes upon.

Around 1939, Uhl founded the Flower Hill Building Corporation, and he soon began one of his earliest and most prominent projects: the Flower Hill Estates subdivision of Flower Hill, New York.

Uhl started building the Flower Hill Estates subdivision around 1939, over the former estate of Samuel L. Hewlett. He planned to build roughly 150 small estate-style homes. He started building along Country Club Drive, adjacent to the North Hempstead Country Club, and built his homes in the colonial style to reflect Flower Hill's historic character and traditions.

By World War II, Uhl had constructed roughly 45 homes in Flower Hill Estates, when construction was temporarily halted due to the wartime efforts. Uhl predicted that the war restrictions, which influenced investors to purchase land to build homes when the war ended, would lead to a major suburban building boom come the end of World War II. Uhl resumed construction following the war.

Uhl famously repurposed old wood from local farmhouses by incorporating them into the interior designs of his homes in Flower Hill Estates, and blended the homes in with the natural surroundings.

In 1950, Uhl built the fifty-acre (20 ha) Plandome Mills development over the former Leeds estate, where approximately eighty homes were constructed.

In 1962, Uhl would help sponsor the development of Orient-by-the-sea near Orient Point, New York. This development would include homes, a large marina on Gardiner's Bay, a dining room and a cafeteria, a swimming pool, a motel, and facilities for seaplanes. Furthermore, the development would feature 400 feet (120 m) of property along Gardiner's Bay.

In 1969, Uhl was responsible for restoring the historic Milleridge Inn in Jericho, New York.

== Death ==
Uhl died at St. Luke's Hospital in Manhattan on December 7, 1984, when he suffered from complications after having surgery; he was 81 at the time of his death.

His visitation took place at the DeFriest Funeral Home in Southold, New York that Monday, and was subsequently buried at the Nassau Knolls Cemetery in Port Washington.

Uhl's son, Thomas, took over for him as the head of the Flower Hill Building Corporation.

== Personal life ==
Uhl's first marriage was to Frances Uhl. Frances would commit suicide in New York Hospital's psychiatric division on September 23, 1957; she suffered from episodes of depression and was admitted to the hospital that past August.

Following her death, Uhl married again, this time to Louise Uhl.

Uhl had two children, William and Thomas, as well as four grandchildren; he had both of his children with Frances.

At the time of his death, Uhl lived in Cutchogue, New York.

== Notable projects ==
- Country Club Estates, Cutchogue, New York
- East Farms at East Hills subdivision, East Hills, New York
- Fairway Farms, Cutchogue, New York
- Flower Hill Estates subdivision, Flower Hill, New York
- Manhasset Bay Estates, Port Washington, New York
- Milleridge Inn restorations, Jericho, New York
- Orient-by-the-Sea, Orient, New York
- Plandome Mills, Plandome, New York

Uhl also built and restored several other developments and individual homes across Long Island, such as in Manhasset, Roslyn, Roslyn Estates, and Great Neck, Syosset, Muttontown, and in numerous other locations across Long Island.

Additionally, many of his homes were built as reproductions of other, historic homes.
