= San Antonio Championship =

Golf tournament

Coordinates: 29.665°N 98.4°W

Tournament information
- Location: San Antonio, Texas
- Established: 1985
- Course(s): TPC San Antonio, AT&T Canyons Course
- Par: 72
- Length: 6,932 yards (6,339 m)
- Tour(s): Champions Tour
- Format: Stroke play
- Prize fund: $1.8 million
- Month played: October
- Final year: 2015

Final champion
- (Germany) Bernhard Langer

Location in the United States

The San Antonio Championship was a golf tournament on the Champions Tour. It was played annually in October in San Antonio, Texas, and was the final full-field event of the Champions Tour season. AT&T was the main sponsor of the tournament from 2006 to 2014. The Canyons Course at TPC San Antonio took over as host beginning in 2011. It was previously played at the Oak Hills Country Club.

The purse for the 2015 tournament was US$1,800,000, with $270,000 going to the winner. The tournament was founded in 1985 as the Dominion Seniors.

== Winners ==
All winners are Americans unless otherwise indicated.

San Antonio Championship

- 2015 (Germany) Bernhard Langer

AT&T Championship

- 2014 Michael Allen
- 2013 Kenny Perry
- 2012 (South Africa) David Frost
- 2011 Fred Couples
- 2010 (Canada) Rod Spittle
- 2009 Phil Blackmar
- 2008 John Cook
- 2007 John Cook
- 2006 Fred Funk

SBC Championship

- 2005 Jay Haas
- 2004 (Zimbabwe) / (Republic of Ireland) Mark McNulty
- 2003 Craig Stadler
- 2002 Dana Quigley
- 2001 Larry Nelson
- 2000 Doug Tewell

Southwestern Bell Dominion

- 1999 John Mahaffey
- 1998 Lee Trevino
- 1997 (Australia) David Graham

SBC Dominion Seniors

- 1996 Tom Weiskopf

SBC presents The Dominion Seniors

- 1995 Jim Albus

Vantage at The Dominion

- 1994 Jim Albus
- 1993 J. C. Snead
- 1992 Lee Trevino
- 1991 Lee Trevino
- 1990 Jim Dent

RJR at The Dominion

- 1989 Larry Mowry

Vantage at The Dominion

- 1988 Billy Casper
- 1987 Chi-Chi Rodríguez

Benson & Hedges Invitational

- 1986 (Australia) Bruce Crampton

Dominion Seniors

- 1985 Don January

== Multiple winners ==
Three men have won the event more than once.

- 3 wins
  - Lee Trevino: 1991, 1992, 1998
- 2 wins
  - Jim Albus: 1994, 1995
  - John Cook: 2007, 2008
