= La Cantera Golf Club =

Golf club in San Antonio, Texas

Coordinates: 29.605691°N 98.622487°W

La Cantera Golf Club is a golf club located in the La Cantera district of San Antonio, Texas, USA. The club played host to the Valero Texas Open, an annual tournament on the PGA Tour, from 1995 to 2009. It is owned by USAA Real Estate.

The championship golf course is 6,896 yards long, and plays to a par of 70. The course was the setting for Tommy Armour III's PGA Tour 72-hole record aggregate score of 254, set in 2003.
