= TPC San Antonio =

Golf resort in San Antonio, Texas

- Location within the United States Location within Texas
- 29.665°N 98.40°W

Club information
- Location: Bexar County, Texas near San Antonio
- Elevation: 1,100 feet (340 m)
- Established: 2010
- Type: Private resort
- Operator: PGA Tour TPC Network
- Tota holes: 36
- Tournaments: Valero Texas Open; AT&T Championship
- Website: Official website

AT&T Canyons Course
- Designed by: Pete Dye and Bruce Lietzke
- Par: 72
- Length: 7,106 yards (6,498 m)
- Course rating: 74.5
- Slope rating: 139

AT&T Oaks Course
- Designed by: Greg Norman and Sergio García
- Par: 72
- Length: 7,435 yards (6,799 m)
- Course rating: 76.6
- Slope rating: 145

TPC San Antonio is a golf resort in the south central United States, located in the Cibolo Canyons area just north of San Antonio, Texas.

Opened in February 2010, the resort features two 18-hole golf courses: the AT&T Canyons Course designed by Pete Dye, in consultation with Bruce Lietzke, and the AT&T Oaks Course designed by Greg Norman, in consultation with Sergio García. Both courses are members of the Tournament Players Club network operated by the PGA Tour; the Oaks Course has hosted the tour's Valero Texas Open since 2010. The Canyons course was the venue for the AT&T Championship on the Champions Tour from 2011 to 2015.

The courses and clubhouse sits alongside the 1,002-room JW Marriott San Antonio Hill Country Resort and Spa; the approximate average elevation is 1,100 feet (340 m) above sea level.

== Scorecard ==
TPC San Antonio - AT&T Oaks Course
Tee	Rating/Slope	1	2	3	4	5	6	7	8	9	Out	10	11	12	13	14	15	16	17	18	In	Total
Tiburon	76.5/148	454	602	213	481	342	403	207	604	474	3780	447	405	410	241	567	464	183	347	591	3655	7435
Tournament	74.7/145	425	555	203	469	315	384	186	589	461	3587	412	381	394	215	553	443	162	337	550	3447	7034
Players	72.7/142	397	545	171	430	282	372	179	562	425	3363	392	369	362	194	520	423	154	317	530	3261	6624
Club	71.1/138	368	526	159	412	270	340	165	549	411	3200	384	331	348	184	471	394	146	303	481	3042	6242
Forward	74.1/132	308	493	128	352	196	326	140	494	311	2748	338	325	282	166	438	373	121	248	475	2766	5514
Par		4	5	3	4	4	4	3	5	4	36	4	4	4	3	5	4	3	4	5	36	72
SI	Men's	7	9	13	1	15	11	17	5	3		4	12	8	14	10	2	18	16	6
Family	M:60.9/107 W:62.4/106	200	250	105	250	196	200	140	300	250	1891	200	220	200	100	275	250	121	225	325	1916	3807
SI	Ladies' & Family	13	3	11	5	15	9	17	1	7		6	10	8	12	14	4	18	16	2

TPC San Antonio - The Canyons
Tee	Rating/Slope	1	2	3	4	5	6	7	8	9	Out	10	11	12	13	14	15	16	17	18	In	Total
Cibolo	73.6/129	354	571	381	182	451	565	362	165	435	3466	400	423	532	216	453	575	224	335	482	3640	7106
Tournament	71.8/127	354	532	370	165	421	540	362	165	400	3309	376	406	515	190	405	541	199	319	441	3392	6701
Players	69.7/125	325	500	330	152	400	525	343	154	370	3099	339	383	495	172	370	501	175	304	398	3137	6236
Club	M:67.6/118 W:72.5/123	293	463	306	120	349	479	302	124	340	2776	313	345	462	151	346	452	160	289	361	2879	5655
Forward	M:64.4/112 W:69.5/112	280	423	290	104	304	468	270	109	303	2551	285	308	384	116	309	415	150	207	328	2502	5053
Par		4	5	4	3	4	5	4	3	4	36	4	4	5	3	4	5	3	4	4	36	72
SI	Men's	15	5	17	11	1	7	9	13	3		14	4	10	12	2	18	8	16	6
Family	M:62.3/112 W:65.3/108	200	370	250	104	280	368	165	109	303	2149	220	233	300	116	253	380	104	207	285	2098	4247
SI	Ladies' & Family	3	9	13	17	7	1	11	15	5		10	4	12	18	2	14	8	16	6
