= Aurora Country Club =

Golf course in Aurora, Illinois

Coordinates: 41.747750°N 88.356257°W

Aurora Country Club is an 18-hole golf course located in Aurora, Illinois. It was founded in 1914.

The original clubhouse was a stone farmhouse remodeled. The clubhouse burned down in 1941.

Tom Bendelow and William B. Langford collaborated on the 18 hole layout. A. W. Tillinghast provided redesign work in 1935.

The course is 6,800 yards from the longest tees, par of 72. The course rating from the back tee's is 73.5 with a slope rating of 133.
