= Paramount Country Club =

Private Country Club in New York

- Interactive map of Paramount Country Club
- 41°10′37″N 73°59′17″W

Club information
- Location: New City, New York
- Established: 1948
- Type: Private
- Owner: Unknown
- Tota holes: 18
- Website: www.paramountcountryclub.com
- Designed by: A. W. Tillinghast
- Par: 71
- Length: 6,767 yards
- Course rating: 73.5
- Slope rating: 134
- logo of Paramount Country Club

Paramount Country Club (founded 1948) is a private country club located near New City, New York, on the site of Mountain View Farm, the former home of Paramount Pictures founder Adolph Zukor. It features an 18-hole golf course designed by golf course architect A.W. Tillinghast.

== History ==
Paramount Country Club is located on land originally bought by Paramount Pictures founder Adolf Zukor in 1918, from Lawrence Abraham. Zukor expanded this estate, commissioning noted golf course architect A.W. Tillinghast to build an eighteen-hole golf course on the property, which opened in 1920.

Following the reorganization of Paramount Pictures in 1936, Zukor was not able to continue maintaining the Mountain View Farm estate as a private property, and so opened it for membership as the Mountain View Golf and Country Club. In 1948, he sold the property, which became the Dells Golf and Country Club and then Dellwood Country Club. In 2011 the club changed its name to Paramount Country Club, "a name which better reflects the rich history of the club."

The course was redesigned by William F. Mitchell in 1951 and Robert Trent Jones in 1956. In 2013, the golf course was completely renovated by Jim Urbina.

Paramount Country Club's Golf Course was voted as having the Best U.S. Private Renovation in the January 2014 issue of Golf Magazine.

== Facilities ==
As well as the 18-hole championship golf course, Paramount Country Club has other sporting facilities, such as 12 har-tru tennis courts and an olympic-sized swimming pool.

Paramount Country Club
Tee	Rating/Slope	1	2	3	4	5	6	7	8	9	Out	10	11	12	13	14	15	16	17	18	In	Total
Blue	73.5/134	372	586	134	383	406	381	570	432	167	3431	422	370	394	239	350	431	427	510	193	3336	6767
White	72.1/132	361	577	127	370	400	363	542	419	153	3312	403	337	378	220	332	413	410	495	183	3171	6483
Red	67.9/123	325	508	102	300	380	335	481	316	126	2873	329	319	352	178	317	387	281	383	132	2678	5551
Par	Par	4	5	3	4	4	4	5	4	3	36	4	4	4	3	4	4	4	5	3	35	71
SI	Handicap	1	3	17	5	7	15	11	9	13		6	12	4	14	10	6	2	16	18
