= Brackenridge Park Golf Course =

Historic golf course in San Antonio, TX, USA

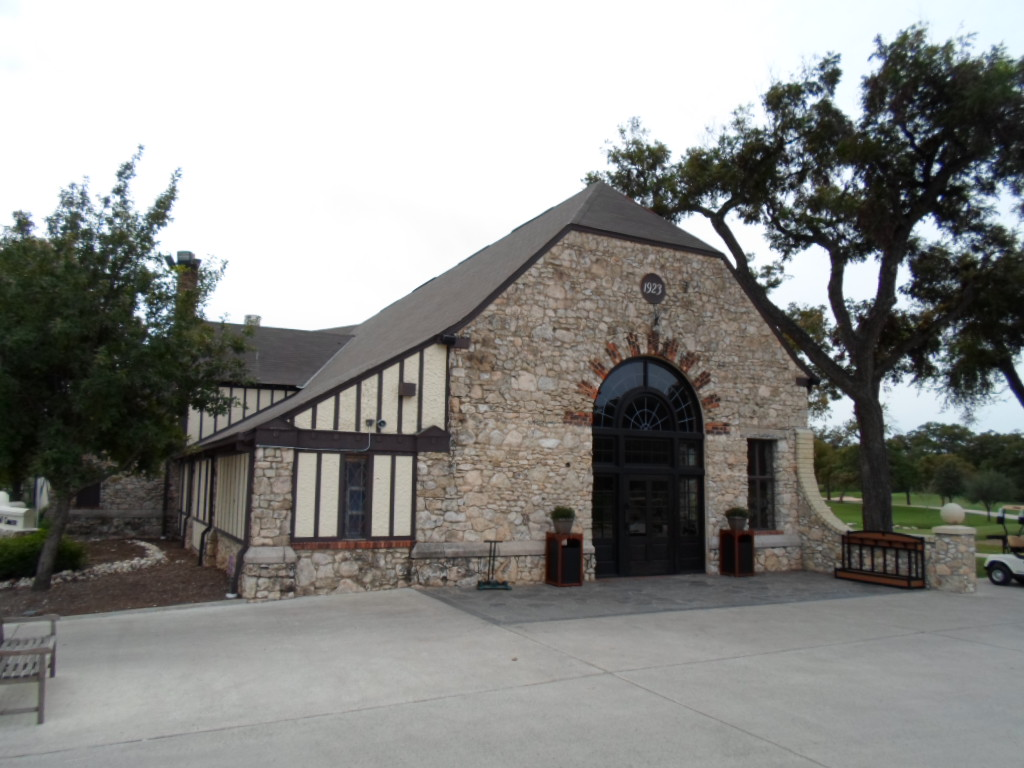
- Brackenridge Park Club House
- Interactive map of Brackenridge Park Golf Course

Club information
- Location: San Antonio, Texas
- Established: 1916
- Owner: City of San Antonio
- Operator: Alamo City Golf Trail
- Total holes: 18
- Tournaments: Texas Open (1922-1926, 1929-1932, 1934, 1939-1940, 1950-1955, 1957-1959)
- Website: alamocitygolftrail.com

Brackenridge Park Golf Course
- Designed by: A.W. Tillinghast
- Par: 71
- Length: 6,243 yards (5,709 m)
- Course rating: 70.3
- Slope rating: 126

Brackenridge Park Golf Course is a historic golf course in San Antonio, Texas and the oldest 18-hole public golf course in Texas. It opened for play in 1916 and was the first inductee into the Texas Golf Hall of Fame. Brackenridge Park was the original site of the Texas Open which held the tournament for most years between 1922-1959. Located in historic Brackenridge Park, the course is one of six municipal golf courses managed by the non-profit management group, the Alamo City Golf Trail. The Alamo City Golf Trail consists of Brackenridge Park Golf Course, Cedar Creek Golf Course, Mission del Lago Golf Course, Olmos Basin Golf Course, Northern Hills Golf Course, Riverside Golf Course, San Pedro Driving Range and Par 3, and Willow Springs Golf Course.

== History ==
=== Location ===
George Washington Brackenridge donated over 100 acres of land to the city to create Brackenridge Park, the park in which the present day Brackenridge Park Golf Course is located.

Ray Lambert's appointment as City Parks Commissioner in 1915 began a new era for Brackenridge Park. Lambert inherited a parks system that was underfunded and growing quickly. He immediately asked for almost a threefold increase in budget (to $60,000), and earmarked much of this increase for the further development of Brackenridge Park. One of Lambert's major projects was the construction of a public golf course. A public course had been advocated by golf enthusiasts for many years as a tourist attraction for the City. There were three other courses in San Antonio at that time, all private. In October 1915, it was reported that the 18-hole Brackenridge Park golf course was under construction. Noted course designer A.W. Tillinghast was hired to design and build the golf course. A clubhouse was also proposed, as well as a swimming hole "so that after the game the players may enjoy a plunge in the delightful waters of the San Antonio River."

Currently the historic golf course remains in operation near downtown, and the San Antonio Zoo and Aquarium. San Antonio landmarks, the Witte Museum and San Antonio Japanese Tea Gardens, are also located nearby.

=== The Clubhouse ===
The original clubhouse was a small one-story building that burned down in 1920. In 1922, the City hired Ralph H. Cameron to design and build a new clubhouse for the golf course and the Texas Open. $8,000 was raised by the City for clubhouse construction. Cameron designed other notable San Antonio buildings, including the Scottish Rite Cathedral (1923), Neo-Gothic Medical Arts Building (1925), the Frost Brothers Store (1930), and the U.S. Post Office and Court House (1937).

=== Borglum Studio ===
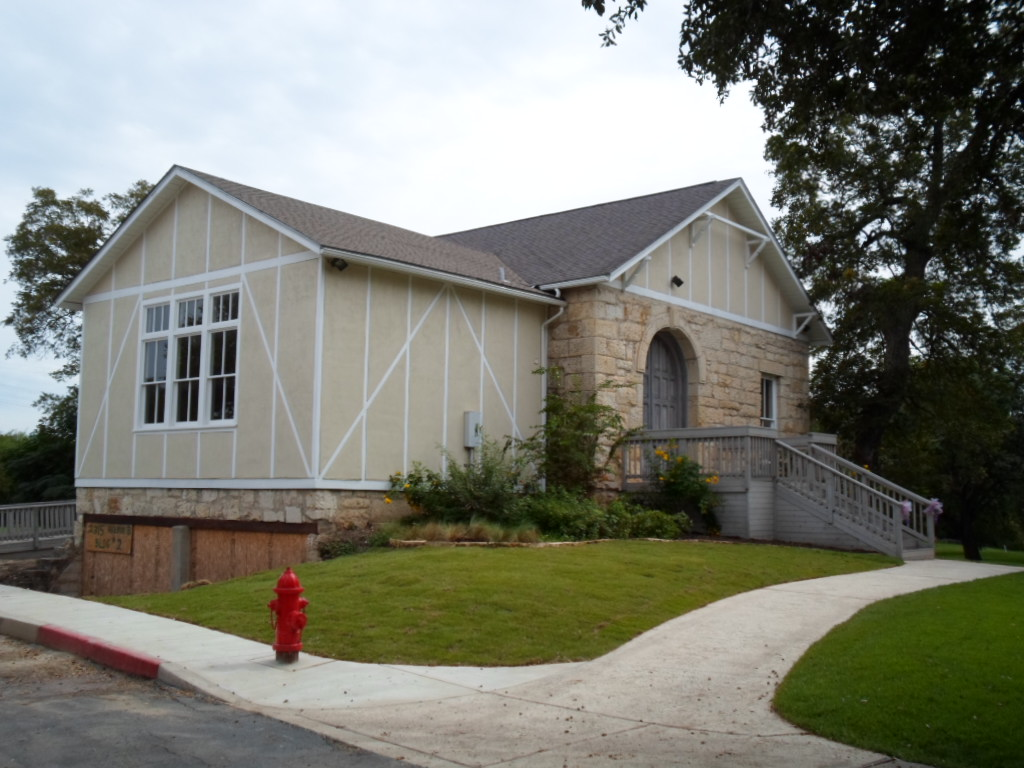
The Borglum Studio (Oct. 2012)

An adjacent building to the Brackenridge Park Golf Clubhouse once served as the working studio for artist Gutzon Borglum, the sculptor who created the heads of the U.S. Presidents on Mount Rushmore. The structure was built in 1885 from local limestone and timbers to serve as a water pumping station. In 1905, the pump house became obsolete with the drilling of artisan wells into the Edwards Aquifer. Around the abandoned pump house, the untamed land was sculpted into a golf course. In Reid Meyers' self-published book, "The Ghosts of Old Brack," he spotlights Gutzon Borglum's arrival in San Antonio in 1924 and his rental of the old pump house. Through the windows, he likely would have seen golfers warming up. "That was what made it nice as an artist studio, the setting and light, the large space," says San Antonio historian Maria Watson Pfeiffer.

After Borglum's use of the studio passed, it served as the creative space of other noted regional artists, and art students of the Wiite and Fort Sam Houston.

Today, the Borglum Studio looks out on the 17th hole of the golf course.

=== The Schrievers ===
U.S. Air Force General Bernard Adolph Schriever grew up in a small house near the 12th green of the historic layout of Brackenridge Park. He and his younger brother, Gerhardt, were best friends with Tod Menefee and the Schriever's mother (Elizabeth) operated a small but popular sandwich stand for the golfers in the back yard. Bernard won the State Junior and the San Antonio City Golf Championship twice. He captained the Texas A&M golf team for two years before entering the army. He is mostly known for his role in the air force's space and missile program, and managing the nuclear arsenal during the Cold War. In 2011, Bernard was inducted into the Texas Golf Hall of Fame posthumously (died in 2005). His 97-year-old brother Gerhardt Schriever was there to accept the honor.

=== Notable records ===
In 1939, Harold "Jug" McSpaden posted the course record of 59 during an exhibition match played with Byron Nelson, Ben Hogan, and Paul Runyan.

Mike Souchak set a PGA Tour 72-hole record of 257 at the 1955 Texas Open. The record held until 2001.

Three of the first six 60s shot in PGA Tour history came at Brackenridge Park. Al Brosch was the first to do it, with an 11-under during the third round of the 1951 Texas Open. In 1954, Ted Kroll matched Brosch, with a 60 of his own, also during the third round of the Texas Open. The following year, Souchak opened the Texas Open with a 60 (27-33) on his way to the 257 that gave him the title that season.

=== Texas Open ===
The Texas Open was held at Brackenridge Park in: 1922-1926, 1929-1932, 1934, 1939-1940, 1950-1955, and 1957-1959. No tournament was played in 1933 and 1935-1938. The Texas Open was the first professional golf tournament in Texas and one of the first events to be played during the winter. The first Open held in 1922 had a $5,000 purse, the largest purse of any golf tournament at the time. In 1960, the San Antonio Golf Association moved the Texas Open to Oak Hills Country Club, another Tillinghast designed course.

Texas Open winners at Brackenridge Park Golf Course

Year	Player	Country	Score	To par	1st Prize ($)	Purse ($)	Ref
1959	Wes Ellis	United States	276	-8	2,800	20,000	
1958	Bill Johnston	United States	274	-10	2,000	15,000	
1957	Jay Hebert	United States	271	-13	2,800	20,000	
1955	Mike Souchak	United States	257	-27	2,200	12,500	
1954	Chandler Harper	United States	259	-25	2,200	12,500	
1953	Tony Holguin	United States	264	-20	2,000	10,000	
1952	Jack Burke Jr.	United States	260	-24	2,000	10,000	
1951	Dutch Harrison	United States	265*	-19	2,000	10,000	
1950	Sam Snead	United States	265	-19	2,000	10,000	
1940	Byron Nelson	United States	271*	-13	1,500	5,000	
1939	Dutch Harrison	United States	271	-13	1,250	5,000	
1935–38	No tournament						
1934	Wiffy Cox	United States	283	-5	750	2,500	
1932	Clarence Clark	United States	287	+3	600	2,500	
1931	Abe Espinosa	United States	281	-3	1,500	6,000	
1930	Denny Shute	United States	277	-7	1,500	7,500	
1929	Bill Mehlhorn	United States	277	-7	1,500	6,500	
1926	Macdonald Smith	Scotland	288	+4	1,500	8,000	
1925	Joe Turnesa	United States	284	E	1,500	6,000	
1924	Joe Kirkwood, Sr.	Australia	279		1,500	6,000	
1923	Walter Hagen	United States	279*		1,500	6,000	
1922	Robert MacDonald		281		1,500	5,000	

* Indicates a win in a playoff
^ Indicates weather-shortened to 54 holes
Note: Green highlight indicates scoring records.
Main sources

== Texas Golf Hall of Fame ==
The Texas Golf Walk of Fame

The Texas Golf Hall of Fame is now headquartered at Brackenridge Park Golf Course after closing in The Woodlands, Texas in the late 1990s. Several upgrades have been added to the golf course to accommodate The Texas Golf Hall of Fame including a new pavilion to host events and The Texas Golf Walk of Fame. The Texas Golf Walk of Fame connects the Brackenridge Clubhouse and Borglum Studio together with exhibit monuments dedicated to Hall of Fame members. The Cavenders, best known for their sprawling auto sales business, offered $50,000 to underwrite the cost of the Walk of Fame. The Walk of Fame is designed as a garden area that connects the clubhouse to the studio near the 17th green. The family's donation was in honor of their grandfather, legendary longtime San Antonio Country Club head pro Tod Menefee. Their mother, Betty Cavender, also partnered in the grant.

== Course Design and Features ==
Brackenridge Park Golf Course was originally designed by A.W. Tillinghast and opened in 1916.

=== Course Information ===
Brackenridge Park Golf Course - Score Card
Tee	Rating/Slope	1	2	3	4	5	6	7	8	9	Out	10	11	12	13	14	15	16	17	18	In	Total
Blue	73.9 / 146	394	507	160	359	446	360	407	195	546	3374	388	519	332	156	436	416	486	128	426	3287	6661
White	70.9 / 137	360	469	134	324	422	333	382	168	522	3114	351	469	313	141	377	366	470	115	387	2989	6103
Red	72.3 / 143	394	507	160	359	422	360	382	168	522	3274	388	469	332	156	377	366	486	128	426	3128	6402
Par		4	5	3	4	4	4	4	3	5	36	4	5	4	3	4	4	5	3	4	36	72
SI	Men's	11	15	17	9	3	13	1	7	5		12	8	16	18	4	6	10	14	2
SI	Women's	11	1	17	5	7	13	9	15	3		10	2	14	18	12	8	4	16	6

Fairways Grass: TifSport Bermuda.

Greens: Miniverde Ultradwarf Bermuda

Water hazards: Moderate

Sand Bunkers: Heavy

=== Renovation and Restoration ===
1968

Brackenridge was completely renovated and remodeled in 1968 due to the construction project on 281 and I-35. The controversial decision to construct U.S. 281 right through the back nine caused the course to lose 10 acres, and a few of the long par 4s on the back nine were shortened. The architecture firm Johnson and Dempsey and Associates, along with George A. Hoffman and Murray Brooks, redesigned the back nine holes to fit on smaller property. Ponds were added to the course but the river was filled in throughout certain parts of the golf course.

2008

The golf course experienced a revival in 2008 after a $4.5 million renovation. Architect John Colligan restored fifteen of the original 18 holes; the course now measures 6,243 yards from the back tees (par-71) and occupies only 113 acres of urban green space.

=== Recognitions ===
In 2012, Brackenridge Park Golf Course was ranked the 29th Best Municipal Golf Course in the United States by Golf Week. The course was also ranked the 16th Best Course in Texas.
