= Oak Hills Country Club =

Golf course in San Antonio, Texas

- Location within the United States Location within Texas
- 29.506°N 98.568°W

Club information
- Location: 5403 Fredericksburg Road; San Antonio, Texas, U.S.
- Elevation: 1,010 feet (310 m)
- Established: 1921, front nine (1922), back nine (1927)
- Type: Private
- Tota holes: 18
- Website: oakhillscc.com

Golf Course
- Designed by: A.W. Tillinghast
- Par: 71
- Length: 6,886 yards (6,297 m)
- Course rating: 74.3
- Slope rating: 142
- Course record: 60

Oak Hills Country Club is a private golf club in the southern United States, located in San Antonio, Texas. Northwest of downtown, it was founded 105 years ago in 1921 as the "Alamo Country Club." Designed by renowned architect A.W. Tillinghast, the golf course opened for member play in 1922. Closed during the Great Depression, it reopened in 1946 as Oak Hills Country Club.

Oak Hills has hosted a number of PGA Tour events. The inaugural Tour Championship in 1987 at Oak Hills was won by Tom Watson with a birdie on the 72nd hole; the 6-iron used for the approach shot hangs in the pro shop. The tour's Texas Open was held at the course twenty-three times between 1961–1994, and the AT&T Championship on the Champions Tour nine times (2002–2010). It also hosted the U.S. Junior Amateur Golf Championship in 2001.

The course record at Oak Hills is 60, shot twice, once in 1992 by David Ogrin in the Texas Open pro-am with nines of 26–34, and Anthony Rodriguez in 2008 in a recreational but witnessed game. Oak Hills has had several touring pros as members and boasts one of the best golfing memberships in the country with it being typical for 30 or more members being scratch or better at any given time.

Its golf course is known as an architectural gem and, as such, was a beloved stop for both PGA and Champions Tour players. It was consistently ranked as the #1 course in the San Antonio area for many years with its small greens and notoriously deep Tillinghast bunkers. Many players have publicly lamented the departure of professional golf from this venue.
