= Scarsdale Golf Club =

Golf club in Hartsdale, New York

Coordinates: 41°00′42″N 73°47′54″W

Club information
- Location: Hartsdale, Town of Greenburgh, Westchester County, New York, USA
- Established: 1898
- Type: Private
- Total holes: 18
- Website: Official website
- Designed by: A. W. Tillinghast
- Par: 71
- Length: 6,350 yards
- Course rating: 71.5

Scarsdale Golf Club is a private golf club located in Hartsdale, New York.

== History ==
The club contains the Scarsdale Golf Course, founded in 1898, which was designed by famed golf course architect A. W. Tillinghast. Additionally, the club grounds encompass six har-tru tennis courts, an Olympic-size pool, a small pool, four platform tennis courts, a clubhouse, six bowling lanes, and many other structures along the property. Jack Dowling was serving as the club's head professional in 1918.

The clubhouse, built in 1921, was renovated in 2004. When the club was formed on May 31, 1898, the goal was to attract more people (and golfers) to the Scarsdale area and to provide additional recreational activities for families that resided nearby.

=== Red Cross 4-ball match ===
Scarsdale club professional Jack Dowling, who was paired with Tom McNamara in a match held on 15 September 1918 at Scarsdale Golf Club, defeated Chick Evans (national amateur and open champion), and Bobby Jones, in a Red Cross four-ball match on the links of the Scarsdale Golf Club by the score of 1 up. The proceeds from the match were donated to the Red Cross for its war-time efforts during World War I. Dowling took full advantage in winning the match since the event was contested on his home course.

== Scorecard ==
Tee	Rating/Slope	1	2	3	4	5	6	7	8	9	Out	10	11	12	13	14	15	16	17	18	In	Total
Blue	71.5/139	345	175	370	400	165	545	430	465	325	3220	475	160	350	290	455	130	375	365	530	3130	6350
White	70.3/135	350	165	350	375	140	510	380	450	310	3010	455	150	340	290	450	120	370	355	505	3035	6045
Par	Par	4	3	4	4	3	5	4	4	4	35	5	3	4	4	4	3	4	4	5	36	71
