= Quaker Ridge Golf Club =

Private golf club in Scarsdale, New York

Coordinates: 40°57′58″N 73°45′53″W

- Interactive map of Quaker Ridge Golf Club

Club information
- Location: Scarsdale, New York, U.S.
- Established: 1916
- Type: private
- Total holes: 18
- Tournaments: Walker Cup (1997); Curtis Cup (2018)
- Website: www.quakerridgegc.org
- Designed by: A. W. Tillinghast
- Par: 70
- Length: 7,008 yards
- Course rating: 74.5
- Course record
- Quaker Ridge Golf Club
- U.S. National Register of Historic Places
- New York State Register of Historic Places
- NRHP reference No.: 100005485
- NYSRHP No.: 11916.000043

Significant dates
- Added to NRHP: June 16, 2020
- Designated NYSRHP: June 16, 2020

Quaker Ridge Golf Club is a private golf club in Scarsdale, New York, that contains the Quaker Ridge Golf Course. Additionally, club grounds encompass numerous tennis courts, a swimming pool, a clubhouse and many other structures along the property.

== History ==
The club was formed as a Jewish country club in 1916 by a group of businessmen who had acquired the land a year earlier from a smaller, financially strained club. Renowned golf course designer A. W. Tillinghast was brought in to redesign the seven existing holes and construct 11 new ones. The course was completed in 1918 and the Tudor-styled clubhouse was built in 1923. In 1925, the purchase of additional property prompted the club to recommission Tillinghast to incorporate the new land into the existing course. The course has remained relatively unchanged since its construction. A few outdated bunkers were replaced in 1965. Between 1991 and 1993 all the bunkers were restored and several tees were added. Among its many noted features, the course has distinctly narrow fairways.

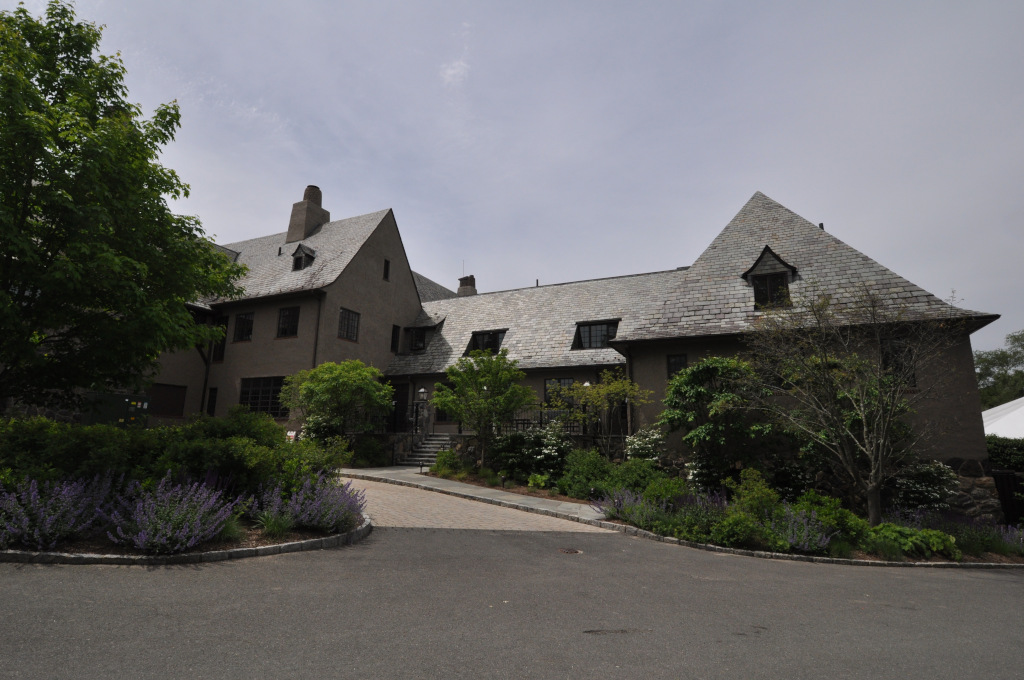
The clubhouse

Johnny Farrell was the head professional at the Quaker Ridge from 1919–1930.

Quaker Ridge has hosted a number of tournaments including two Metropolitan Amateurs, three Metropolitan Opens, two Metropolitan PGA Championships and the 1997 Walker Cup. Quaker Ridge also hosted the Curtis Cup in 2018.

In 1969, Jimmy Demaret stated, "Quaker Ridge is the most underrated golf course in the New York area, because it has never been host course to a major championship. I'd like to go on record as saying it would be a tough test of golf for any tournament – the U.S. Open and the PGA included." Two-time PGA Champion Paul Runyan, who played the 1936 Metropolitan Open at Quaker, said that Quaker Ridge "is the greatest golf course in the world."

In 2008, Golf Digest rated Quaker Ridge the 30th best course in the United States. The course was also ranked 64th in the world in 2007 by Golf Magazine.

== Course layout ==
Quaker Ridge Golf Club
Tee	Rating/Slope	1	2	3	4	5	6	7	8	9	Out	10	11	12	13	14	15	16	17	18	In	Total
Black	74.8/140	527	425	451	454	185	478	437	359	164	3480	201	406	446	234	576	408	430	371	456	3528	7008
Blue	72.0/138	510	405	424	408	151	434	416	335	143	3226	186	372	403	209	517	375	414	344	410	3230	6456
White	70.7/134	496	389	414	384	132	424	380	318	134	3071	172	360	377	196	499	368	392	337	391	3092	6163
SI	Men	7	5	9	11	17	1	3	13	15		18	10	2	14	6	12	4	16	8
Par	Men/Women	5	4	4/5	4	3	4/5	4	4	3	35/37	3	4	4	3	5	4	4/5	4	4	35/36	70/73
Green	75.1/141	417	359	404	363	113	414	368	308	127	2873	130	288	350	181	432	360	408	330	354	2833	5706
SI	Women	3	7	11	9	17	5	1	13	15		18	8	6	16	2	4	10	14	12

== See also ==
- Westchester Country Club
- Jewish country club
