= Shackamaxon Country Club =

Coordinates: 40°37′42″N 74°21′07″W

Shackamaxon Country Club is a private golf country club and banquet facility located in Scotch Plains, New Jersey.

== History ==
=== A. W. Tillinghast design ===
The course was designed by golf course architect A. W. Tillinghast and is regaining its status as one of the metropolitan New York areas top golf clubs.

=== Memorable match at Shackamaxon ===
One of the early head professionals at the club was Peter O'Hara. In 1920 O'Hara joined forces with his brother Patrick as assistant professional. Peter remained at the club until 1922. The two brothers were a tough pair to beat in four-ball matches on their home course as evidenced by a surprising 6 and 5 victory they had in 1920 over the highly favored duo of Harry Vardon and Ted Ray.

=== Tournaments hosted ===
The club hosted qualifying for the 1919 PGA Championship. It also hosted the 1928 Metropolitan Open won by Tommy Armour, and a PGA Tour event named Cavalcade Of Golf in 1955 won by Cary Middlecoff.
