= Valero Texas Open =

American golf tournament

Coordinates: 29.6666°N 98.4007°W

Tournament information
- Location: San Antonio, Texas
- Established: 1922
- Courses: TPC San Antonio (Oaks Course)
- Par: 72
- Length: 7,435 yards (6,799 m)
- Organized by: Valero Foundation
- Tour: PGA Tour
- Format: Stroke play
- Prize fund: US$9,800,000
- Month played: April
- Website: valerotexasopen.com

Tournament record score
- Aggregate: 254 Tommy Armour III (2003)
- To par: −27 Mike Souchak (1955)

Current champion
- (United States) J. J. Spaun

Location map
- Location in the United States Location in Texas

The Texas Open, known as the Valero Texas Open for sponsorship reasons, is a professional golf tournament on the PGA Tour, played just north of San Antonio, Texas. It dates back 104 years to 1922, when it was first called the Texas Open; San Antonio-based Valero Energy Corporation took over naming rights in 2002. It is played at The Oaks Course at the TPC San Antonio. The Valero Energy Foundation is the host organization for the Valero Texas Open.

== History ==
The event is managed by Wasserman Media Group as of 2017. In 2003, it was the site of the 72-hole PGA Tour scoring record of 254, shot by Tommy Armour III. Many big-name players have won this tournament, including Sam Snead, Ben Hogan, and Arnold Palmer, who won it three years in a row. It has always been considered a tournament where it is relatively easy to shoot low scores. Since 1934, every tournament winner has finished with a score under-par.

It has always been played in the San Antonio area, and is the sixth oldest professional golf tournament worldwide, the third oldest on the PGA Tour and the longest held in the same city. The tournament has been hosted on eight different golf courses. From its inception until 1940, it was held at Brackenridge Park Golf Course, with the exception of 1927–1928, when it was played at Willow Springs Golf Course. After the event left Brackenridge Park, it returned to Willow Springs (1941–1949). In 1950 and 1951, it was played at both Brackenridge Park and Ft. Sam Houston Golf Course; afterwards it stayed at Brackenridge Park, with the exception of 1956 and 1960, when it returned to Ft. Sam Houston.

Oak Hills Country Club hosted from 1961 to 1966, then it went to Pecan Valley Golf Club (1967–1970). There was no event in 1968, as Pecan Valley was the site of the PGA Championship in July. No event was held in 1971; it was played at Woodlake Golf Club for five editions (1972–1976), then returned to Oak Hills (1977–1994). (No event was held in 1987, as Oak Hills hosted the first Tour Championship in late October.)

It was held at the Resort Course at La Cantera Golf Club (1995–2009), then moved to its present site on The Oaks Course at TPC San Antonio, in the affluent Cibolo Canyon community, in 2010.

The Texas Open was usually held in September or October; in 2007 and 2008, the event was demoted to the Fall Series. With the demise of the Atlanta Classic, the PGA Tour moved the Texas Open into that slot on the schedule in May 2009 and it became a regular FedEx Cup event. The 2009 event offered an increased purse of $6.1 million (up from $4.5 million) and its winner's share exceeded $1 million for the first time. In 2011, the event moved to the week following the Masters Tournament; that 2011 edition is best known for Kevin Na's 16 (+12) on the ninth hole in the opening round.

As a Fall Series event, the Valero Texas Open was the alternate tournament to the Presidents and Ryder Cups. In 2013, the tournament was in early April, the week before The Masters, and aired on NBC for the first time; several European Tour players participated in the Texas Open for the first time since the mid-1980s.

Since Valero became title sponsor in 2002, the tournament has become the annual leader in charitable fundraising among PGA Tour events. In 2015, the Valero Texas Open became only the fourth PGA Tour event to eclipse the $100 million milestone in funds raised for charity. The 2021 Valero Texas Open raised a record breaking $16 million for charity, bringing the grand total to over $187 million in charitable giving.

In 2019, the Valero Texas Open returned to being played before The Masters, thereby shifting the weekend coverage from CBS to NBC.

Due to the COVID-19 pandemic, the 2020 Valero Texas Open was cancelled just three weeks before taking place but returned in 2021, the week before The Masters.

== Course layout ==
Oaks Course

Hole	1	2	3	4	5	6	7	8	9	Out	10	11	12	13	14	15	16	17	18	In	Total
Yards	454	602	213	481	401	403	207	604	474	3,839	447	405	410	241	567	464	183	347	591	3,655	7,494
Par	4	5	3	4	4	4	3	5	4	36	4	4	4	3	5	4	3	4	5	36	72

- The approximate average elevation of the course is 1,100 feet (340 m) above sea level.

== Highlights ==
- 1951: Al Brosch became the first player to record a round of 60 in a PGA Tour event.
- 1955: Mike Souchak's 257 (–27) set records for a 72-hole PGA Tour event: the under-par record stood until John Huston's 28-under par 260 at the 1998 Hawaiian Open, and the scoring record lasted until 2001, when Mark Calcavecchia shot 256 (–28) at the Phoenix Open.
- 2004: Oft-injured Bart Bryant, recovering from elbow surgery and playing on a Major Medical Extension, earned his first PGA Tour win in his 187th start.
- 2005: Robert Gamez won his first event since March 1990, giving him the record for longest time between PGA Tour wins.
- 2017: After 180 PGA Tour starts and six runner-up finishes, Kevin Chappell birdied the 72nd hole for his first PGA Tour win.
- 2019: Corey Conners, playing on conditional status, Monday qualified for the tournament and earned his first PGA Tour win the week before the Masters. He was the first player to win on the PGA Tour after qualifying on a Monday in nine years.

== Winners ==
Year	Winner	Score	To par	Margin of victory	Runner(s)-up	Purse ($)	Winner's share ($)	Ref.
Valero Texas Open
2026	(United States) J. J. Spaun (2)	271	−17	1 stroke	(United States) Michael Kim (Scotland) Robert MacIntyre (England) Matt Wallace	9,800,000	1,764,000	
2025	(United States) Brian Harman	279	−9	3 strokes	(United States) Ryan Gerard	9,500,000	1,710,000	
2024	(United States) Akshay Bhatia	268	−20	Playoff	(United States) Denny McCarthy	9,200,000	1,656,000	
2023	(Canada) Corey Conners (2)	273	−15	1 stroke	(United States) Sam Stevens	8,900,000	1,602,000	
2022	(United States) J. J. Spaun	275	−13	2 strokes	(Australia) Matt Jones (United States) Matt Kuchar	8,600,000	1,548,000	
2021	(United States) Jordan Spieth	270	−18	2 strokes	(United States) Charley Hoffman	7,700,000	1,386,000	
2020	Canceled due to the COVID-19 pandemic							
2019	(Canada) Corey Conners	268	−20	2 strokes	(United States) Charley Hoffman	7,500,000	1,350,000	
2018	(United States) Andrew Landry	271	−17	2 strokes	(United States) Trey Mullinax (United States) Sean O'Hair	6,200,000	1,116,000	
2017	(United States) Kevin Chappell	276	−12	1 stroke	(United States) Brooks Koepka	6,200,000	1,116,000	
2016	(United States) Charley Hoffman	276	−12	1 stroke	(United States) Patrick Reed	6,200,000	1,116,000	
2015	(United States) Jimmy Walker	277	−11	4 strokes	(United States) Jordan Spieth	6,200,000	1,116,000	
2014	(Australia) Steven Bowditch	280	−8	1 stroke	(United States) Will MacKenzie (United States) Daniel Summerhays	6,200,000	1,116,000	
2013	(Scotland) Martin Laird	274	−14	2 strokes	(Northern Ireland) Rory McIlroy	6,200,000	1,116,000	
2012	(United States) Ben Curtis	279	−9	2 strokes	(United States) Matt Every (United States) John Huh	6,200,000	1,116,000	
2011	(United States) Brendan Steele	280	−8	1 stroke	(United States) Kevin Chappell (United States) Charley Hoffman	6,200,000	1,116,000	
2010	(Australia) Adam Scott	274	−14	1 stroke	(Sweden) Freddie Jacobson	6,100,000	1,098,000	
2009	(United States) Zach Johnson (2)	265	−15	Playoff	(United States) James Driscoll	6,100,000	1,098,000	
2008	(United States) Zach Johnson	261	−19	2 strokes	(South Korea) Charlie Wi (New Zealand) Tim Wilkinson (United States) Mark Wilson	4,500,000	810,000	
2007	(United States) Justin Leonard (3)	261	−19	Playoff	(Sweden) Jesper Parnevik	4,500,000	810,000	
2006	(United States) Eric Axley	265	−15	3 strokes	(United States) Anthony Kim (England) Justin Rose (United States) Dean Wilson	4,000,000	720,000	
2005	(United States) Robert Gamez	262	−18	3 strokes	(United States) Olin Browne	3,500,000	630,000	
2004	(United States) Bart Bryant	261	−19	3 strokes	(United States) Patrick Sheehan	3,500,000	630,000	
2003	(United States) Tommy Armour III	254	−26	7 strokes	(United States) Loren Roberts (United States) Bob Tway	3,500,000	630,000	
2002	(United States) Loren Roberts	261	−19	3 strokes	(United States) Fred Couples (United States) Fred Funk (United States) Garrett Willis	3,500,000	630,000	
Texas Open
2001	(United States) Justin Leonard (2)	266	−18	2 strokes	(United States) J. J. Henry (United States) Matt Kuchar	3,000,000	540,000	
Westin Texas Open
2000	(United States) Justin Leonard	261	−19	5 strokes	(United States) Mark Wiebe	2,600,000	468,000	
1999	(United States) Duffy Waldorf (2)	270	−18	Playoff	(United States) Ted Tryba	2,000,000	360,000	
1998	(United States) Hal Sutton	270	−18	1 stroke	(United States) Jay Haas (United States) Justin Leonard	1,700,000	306,000	
LaCantera Texas Open
1997	(United States) Tim Herron	271	−17	2 strokes	(United States) Rick Fehr (United States) Brent Geiberger	1,400,000	252,000	
1996	(United States) David Ogrin	275	−13	1 stroke	(United States) Jay Haas	1,200,000	216,000	
1995	(United States) Duffy Waldorf	268	−20	6 strokes	(United States) Justin Leonard	1,100,000	198,000	
Texas Open
1994	(United States) Bob Estes	265	−19	1 stroke	(United States) Gil Morgan	1,000,000	180,000	
H.E.B. Texas Open
1993	(United States) Jay Haas (2)	263	−21	Playoff	(United States) Bob Lohr	1,000,000	180,000	
1992	(Zimbabwe) Nick Price	263	−21	Playoff	(Australia) Steve Elkington	900,000	162,000	
1991	(United States) Blaine McCallister	269	−11	Playoff	(United States) Gary Hallberg	900,000	162,000	
1990	(United States) Mark O'Meara	261	−19	1 stroke	(United States) Gary Hallberg	800,000	144,000	
Texas Open
1989	(United States) Donnie Hammond	258	−22	7 strokes	(United States) Paul Azinger	600,000	108,000	
1988	(United States) Corey Pavin	259	−21	8 strokes	(United States) Robert Wrenn	600,000	108,000	
1987: No tournament
Vantage Championship
1986	(United States) Ben Crenshaw (2)	196 (Note: Shortened to 54 holes due to rain.)	−14	1 stroke	(United States) Payne Stewart	1,000,000	180,000	
Texas Open
1985	(United States) John Mahaffey	268	−12	Playoff	(United States) Jodie Mudd	350,000	63,000	
1984	(United States) Calvin Peete	266	−14	3 strokes	(United States) Bruce Lietzke	350,000	63,000	
1983	(United States) Jim Colbert	261	−19	5 strokes	(United States) Mark Pfeil	300,000	54,000	
1982	(United States) Jay Haas	262	−18	3 strokes	(United States) Curtis Strange	250,000	45,000	
1981	(United States) Bill Rogers	266	−14	Playoff	(United States) Ben Crenshaw	250,000	45,000	
San Antonio Texas Open
1980	(United States) Lee Trevino	265	−15	1 stroke	(United States) Terry Diehl	250,000	45,000	
1979	(United States) Lou Graham	268	−12	1 stroke	(United States) Eddie Pearce (United States) Bill Rogers (United States) Doug Tewell	250,000	45,000	
1978	(United States) Ron Streck	265	−15	1 stroke	(United States) Hubert Green (United States) Lon Hinkle	200,000	40,000	
1977	(United States) Hale Irwin	266	−14	2 strokes	(United States) Miller Barber	150,000	30,000	
1976	(United States) Butch Baird	273	−15	Playoff	(United States) Miller Barber	125,000	25,000	
1975	(United States) Don January	275	−13	Playoff	(United States) Larry Hinson	125,000	25,000	
1974	(United States) Terry Diehl	269	−19	1 stroke	(United States) Mike Hill	125,000	25,000	
1973	(United States) Ben Crenshaw	270	−14	2 strokes	(United States) Orville Moody	125,000	25,000	
1972	(United States) Mike Hill	273	−15	2 strokes	(United States) Lee Trevino	125,000	25,000	
1971: No tournament
San Antonio Open Invitational
1970	(United States) Ron Cerrudo	273	−7	5 strokes	(United States) Dick Lotz	100,000	20,000	
Texas Open Invitational
1969	(United States) Deane Beman	274	−10	Playoff	(United States) Jack McGowan	100,000	20,000	
1968: No tournament
1967	(United States) Chi-Chi Rodríguez	277	−7	1 stroke	(New Zealand) Bob Charles (United States) Bob Goalby	100,000	20,000	
1966	(South Africa) Harold Henning	272	−8	3 strokes	(United States) Wes Ellis (United States) Gene Littler (United States) Ken Still	80,000	13,000	
1965	(United States) Frank Beard	270	−10	3 strokes	(United States) Gardner Dickinson	50,000	7,500	
1964	(Australia) Bruce Crampton	273	−7	1 stroke	(New Zealand) Bob Charles (United States) Chi-Chi Rodríguez	40,000	5,800	
1963	(United States) Phil Rodgers	268	−16	2 strokes	(United States) Johnny Pott	30,000	4,300	
1962	(United States) Arnold Palmer (3)	273	−11	1 stroke	(United States) Joe Campbell (United States) Gene Littler (United States) Mason Rudolph (United States) Doug Sanders	30,000	4,300	
1961	(United States) Arnold Palmer (2)	270	−14	1 stroke	(Canada) Al Balding	30,000	4,300	
1960	(United States) Arnold Palmer	276	−12	2 strokes	(United States) Doug Ford (United States) Frank Stranahan	20,000	2,800	
1959	(United States) Wes Ellis	276	−8	2 strokes	(United States) Bill Johnston (United States) Tom Nieporte	20,000	2,800	
1958	(United States) Bill Johnston	274	−10	3 strokes	(United States) Bob Rosburg	15,000	2,000	
1957	(United States) Jay Hebert	271	−13	1 stroke	(United States) Ed Furgol	20,000	2,800	
1956	(United States) Gene Littler	276	−12	2 strokes	(United States) Mike Fetchick (United States) Frank Stranahan (United States) Ernie Vossler	20,000	3,750	
Texas Open
1955	(United States) Mike Souchak	257	−27	7 strokes	(United States) Fred Haas	12,500	2,200	
1954	(United States) Chandler Harper	259	−25	2 strokes	(United States) Johnny Palmer	12,500	2,200	
1953	(United States) Tony Holguin	264	−20	1 stroke	(United States) Doug Ford	10,000	2,000	
1952	(United States) Jack Burke Jr.	260	−24	6 strokes	(United States) Doug Ford	10,000	2,000	
1951	(United States) Dutch Harrison (2)	265	−19	Playoff	(United States) Doug Ford	10,000	2,000	
1950	(United States) Sam Snead (2)	265	−19	1 stroke	(United States) Jimmy Demaret	10,000	2,000	
1949	(United States) Dave Douglas	268	−16	1 stroke	(United States) Sam Snead	10,000	2,000	
1948	(United States) Sam Snead	264	−20	2 strokes	(United States) Jimmy Demaret	10,000	2,000	
San Antonio Texas Open
1947	(United States) Ed Oliver	265	−19	1 stroke	(United States) Jimmy Demaret	10,000	2,000	
1946	(United States) Ben Hogan	264	−20	6 strokes	(United States) Sammy Byrd	7,500	1,500	
Texas Open
1945	(United States) Sammy Byrd	268	−16	1 stroke	(United States) Byron Nelson	5,000	1,000	
1944	(United States) Johnny Revolta	273	−11	1 stroke	(United States) Jug McSpaden (United States) Byron Nelson	5,000	1,000	
1943: No tournament due to World War II
1942	(United States) Chick Harbert	272	−12	Playoff	(United States) Ben Hogan	5,000	1,000	
1941	(United States) Lawson Little	273	−11	3 strokes	(United States) Ben Hogan	5,000	1,200	
1940	(United States) Byron Nelson	271	−13	Playoff	(United States) Ben Hogan	5,000	1,500	
1939	(United States) Dutch Harrison	271	−13	2 strokes	(United States) Sammy Byrd	5,000	1,250	
1935–1938: No tournament
1934	(United States) Wiffy Cox	283	−5	1 stroke	(United States) Byron Nelson (United States) Craig Wood	2,500	750	
1933: No tournament
1932	(United States) Clarence Clark	287	+3	1 stroke	(United States) Gus Moreland (United States) Gene Sarazen	2,500	600	
1931	(United States) Abe Espinosa	281	−3	2 strokes	(England) Harry Cooper (United States) Joe Turnesa (United States) Frank Walsh	6,000	1,500	
1930	(United States) Denny Shute	277	−7	3 strokes	(United States) Ed Dudley (United States) Al Espinosa (United States) Neil McIntyre	7,500	1,500	
1929	(United States) Bill Mehlhorn (2)	277	−7	4 strokes	(United States) Horton Smith	6,500	1,500	
1928	(United States) Bill Mehlhorn	297	+13	1 stroke	(England) Harry Cooper	6,500	1,500	
1927	(Scotland) Bobby Cruickshank	292	+8	3 strokes	(United States) Larry Nabholtz	10,000	1,500	
1926	(Scotland) Macdonald Smith	288	+4	1 stroke	(Scotland) Bobby Cruickshank	8,000	1,500	
1925	(United States) Joe Turnesa	284	E	1 stroke	(Scotland) Macdonald Smith	6,000	1,500	
1924	(Australia) Joe Kirkwood Sr.	279		7 strokes	(United States) George Kerrigan (England) James Ockenden	6,000	1,500	
1923	(United States) Walter Hagen	279		Playoff	(United States) Bill Mehlhorn	6,000	1,500	
1922	(United States) Bob MacDonald	281		1 stroke	(England) Cyril Walker	5,000	1,500	

Note: Green highlight indicates scoring records.
