= A. W. Tillinghast =

American golf course architect (1876–1942)

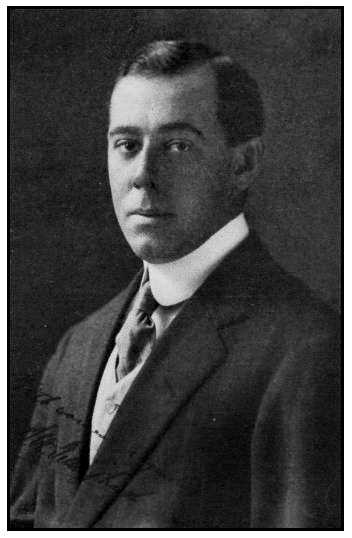
- Tillinghast in 1909
- Born: Albert Warren "Tillie" Tillinghast; May 7, 1876; Philadelphia, Pennsylvania, U.S.
- Died: May 19, 1942 (aged 66); Toledo, Ohio, U.S.
- Occupation: Architect
- Awards: World Golf Hall of Fame (2015)
- Projects: Winged Foot Golf Club, San Francisco Golf Club, Bethpage Black Course, Virginia Country Club, Baltusrol Golf Club, Somerset Hills Golf Club, Quaker Ridge Golf Club, New Castle Field Club, Baltimore Country Club, Shackamaxon Country Club

Albert Warren "Tillie" Tillinghast (May 7, 1876 – May 19, 1942) was an American golf course architect. Tillinghast was one of the most prolific architects in the history of golf; he worked on more than 265 different courses. He was inducted into the World Golf Hall of Fame in 2015.

Tillinghast, along with William Flynn, George C. Thomas Jr., Hugh Wilson, George Crump, and William Fownes together made up the "Philadelphia School" of golf course architecture. Together, the group designed over 300 courses, 27 of which are listed among the top 100 golf courses in the world.

== Early life ==
In 1874, Tillinghast was born in Philadelphia, Pennsylvania, the son of Lavinia Worell Davis and Benjamin Collins Tillinghast, owner of a successful rubber goods company there. He married 17-year-old Lillian Heath Quigley in 1894 in Philadelphia.

== Career ==
Tillinghast-designed courses have hosted multiple professional golf major championships—the 1927, 1928, 1938, and 1949 PGA Championships, contested at Cedar Crest Park, Baltimore Country Club, Shawnee and Hermitage Country Club, respectively; the 2005 and 2016 PGA Championship, contested at Baltusrol Golf Club, which has also been the host of seven U.S. Opens; the 2006 and 2020 U.S. Open, contested at Winged Foot Golf Club; and many others. He also designed the course at the Ridgewood Country Club, used for the 1935 Ryder Cup and Scarboro Golf and Country Club in Toronto, host of the Canadian Open for four occasions. In 1916, he created the Municipal Golf Course, now called Brackenridge Park Golf Course in San Antonio, Texas which hosted the Texas Open from 1922 to 1959. He also designed Oak Hills Country Club in San Antonio, which hosted the Texas Open 24 times between 1960 and 1994.

In Westchester County, New York alone, Tillinghast designed the Fenway Golf Club, Scarsdale; Wykagyl Country Club, New Rochelle; Old Oaks Country Club, Purchase; Quaker Ridge Golf Club, Scarsdale; Scarsdale Golf Club, Hartsdale, where he designed the back nine; Briar Hall Golf & Country Club and Sleepy Hollow Country Club in Briarcliff Manor; and Winged Foot Golf Club (East & West), Mamaroneck. In Rockland County, New York in 1920, Tillinghast created a course specifically for Paramount Pictures founder Adolph Zukor, now known as Paramount Country Club. Tillinghast was also the uncredited co-designer of several green complexes at Century Country Club in Purchase.

== Personal life ==
His wife, Lillian, had two daughters: Marion Frances (1896–1969) and Elsie May (1898–1974). He lived with his wife in Beverly Hills, California, and died at his daughter Marion Frances's home in Toledo, Ohio, in 1942.

== Awards and honors ==
- The Wissahickon Course at the Philadelphia Cricket Club is dedicated to Tillinghast, who designed the course in 1920.
- Tillinghast was inducted into the World Golf Hall of Fame in 2015, the "sixth architect to be inducted into the World Golf Hall of Fame in the Lifetime Achievement category".

== Results in major championships ==
Tournament	1902	1903	1904	1905	1906	1907	1908	1909	1910	1911	1912
U.S. Open						WD			25		
U.S. Amateur	WD	R32	R32	DNQ	DNQ			R32	DNQ		R32

Did not play

WD = withdrew
"T" indicates a tie for a place
DNQ = did not qualify for match play portion
R32 = Round in which player lost in match play

== See also ==
- List of golf courses designed by A. W. Tillinghast
