= Seminole Golf Club =

Golf club in Juno Beach, Florida

- Location within the United States Location within Florida
- 26°51′52″N 80°03′03″W

Club information
- Location: Juno Beach, Florida
- Established: 1929; 97 years ago
- Type: Private
- Tota holes: 18
- Greens: Champion Bermuda grass
- Fairways: 419 Bermuda grass
- Website: seminolegolfclub.com

Seminole Golf Club
- Designed by: Donald Ross (1929); Renovations: Dick Wilson (1957); Bill Coore and Ben Crenshaw (2016–18)
- Par: 72
- Length: 7,265 yards (6,643 m)
- Course rating: 75.4
- Slope rating: 144
- Course record: 60 – Claude Harmon (1947)

Seminole Golf Club is a private golf club in the southeastern United States, located in Juno Beach, Florida. Designed by Donald Ross in 1929, it is consistently ranked as one of the top 100 courses in the nation.

== History ==
Investment banker Edward Francis Hutton began development of the private, 140-acre (57 ha) Seminole Golf Club in 1929 on land previously owned by Harry Kelsey. The site chosen for the course featured a number of sand dune ridges that were carefully brought into play with some fairways directed towards elevated green sites while others drop down from sandy peaks to flatter terrain. Both nines set out from the clubhouse on level ground before veering into the forty-foot (12 m) dune ridge that runs alongside the western edge of the property.

The greens at Seminole are the main line of defense for the course and many of them are cleverly angled, narrowing towards the back which makes rear pin positions extremely tough. Fairway bunkers are generally shallow but sand traps adjacent to the putting surfaces are often deep and troublesome. The course is most noted for its clever routing on a fairly rectangular site, which results in a new wind direction on each hole.

The layout occupies a flat-bottomed bowl set between a high ridge of dunes to the west and the dunes along the Atlantic Ocean to the east. In the middle lie the necessary ponds to handle the drainage. Ross' layout managed to have 14 of the 18 holes touch these two lines of dunes (the 1st, 8th, 9th and 10th holes do not). To reflect and complement the sweep of the sandy property, Ross also used bunkering that was not typical of his other work. Instead of the more standard low-profile bunkering, Ross used flashed-face sand traps that are reminiscent of a George Thomas course rather than a Donald Ross work.

Throughout its history, the club has long been known as a golf club for the corporate elite. In 1947, the club's members included Joseph P. Kennedy, Henry Ford II, Jack Chrysler, Paul Mellon, Phillip Armour, John Pillsbury and Robert Vanderbilt. The club has also hosted kings and presidents: President Dwight D. Eisenhower was an honorary member, Presidents Gerald Ford and John F. Kennedy played it often; and the Duke of Windsor was a member. Henry Picard, winner of the 1938 Masters Tournament, was the professional at Seminole for 26 years and Ben Hogan spent a significant amount of time here playing and practicing. More recently, several media outlets reported in April 2020 that NFL great Tom Brady had joined the club, shortly after he moved from his longtime team of the New England Patriots to the Tampa Bay Buccaneers. Gerry McIlroy, father of golf professional Rory McIlroy is a member at Seminole.

Seminole is one of five golf clubs that participates in an annual rotating-venue members-only golf tournament known as SCAPS; the other clubs are Augusta National Golf Club, Cypress Point Club, Pine Valley Golf Club, and San Francisco Golf Club.

Following a period of relative neglect during and after World War II, Dick Wilson was commissioned to restore the course to its former glory. The original Ross greens were re-grassed and new bunkers were installed, which were intended to mimic the crests of waves on the adjacent Atlantic. In 2016, Bill Coore and Ben Crenshaw were tasked to carry out a three-year renovation of the course, which focused on the rebuilding of over 100 bunkers and exposed sandy expanses in the rough. The extent of the renovations over the years has remained relatively minor, and Seminole Golf Club, along with Pinehurst #2, are both considered by many to be Donald Ross' two masterpieces.

In May 2020, amid the COVID-19 pandemic in the United States, the club hosted a charity skins game organized by Golf Channel, TaylorMade Driving Relief, between Rory McIlroy, Dustin Johnson, Rickie Fowler and Matthew Wolff. Simulcast by NBC and NBCSN, the event supported responses to the pandemic by the American Nurses Foundation and CDC Foundation. It marked the first televised golf event in the United States since the aborted 2020 Players Championship, and the first televised event at the private club in its history.

The club hosted the Walker Cup in May 2021, a 14–12 victory for the United States.

== Scorecard ==
Seminole Golf Club
Tee	Rating/Slope	1	2	3	4	5	6	7	8	9	Out	10	11	12	13	14	15	16	17	18	In	Total
Par		4	4	5	4	3	4	4	3	5	36	4	4	4	3	5	5	4	3	4	36	72
SI		17	5	13	1	15	7	3	9	11		12	2	8	18	14	10	4	16	6
Gold	73.8 / 145	375	387	504	450	207	388	432	235	500	3,478	390	420	367	170	512	497	410	175	417	3,358	6,836 (7,265)
Blue	72.5 / 141	370	379	499	439	188	373	409	224	485	3,366	380	390	360	165	502	475	395	162	398	3,227	6,593
White	69.8 / 131	353	349	432	418	156	358	365	203	455	3,089	358	342	334	140	442	426	367	142	369	2,920	6,009
Par		4	4	5	4	3	4	4	3	5	36	4	4	4	3	5	5	4	3	4	36	72
SI		13	11	7	5	15	1	3	17	9		8	4	14	18	6	2	10	16	12
Red	73.1 / 132	347	311	393	322	138	343	356	170	428	2,808	347	329	327	129	434	395	351	123	340	2,775	5,583
