= Golf Magazine =

American monthly magazine

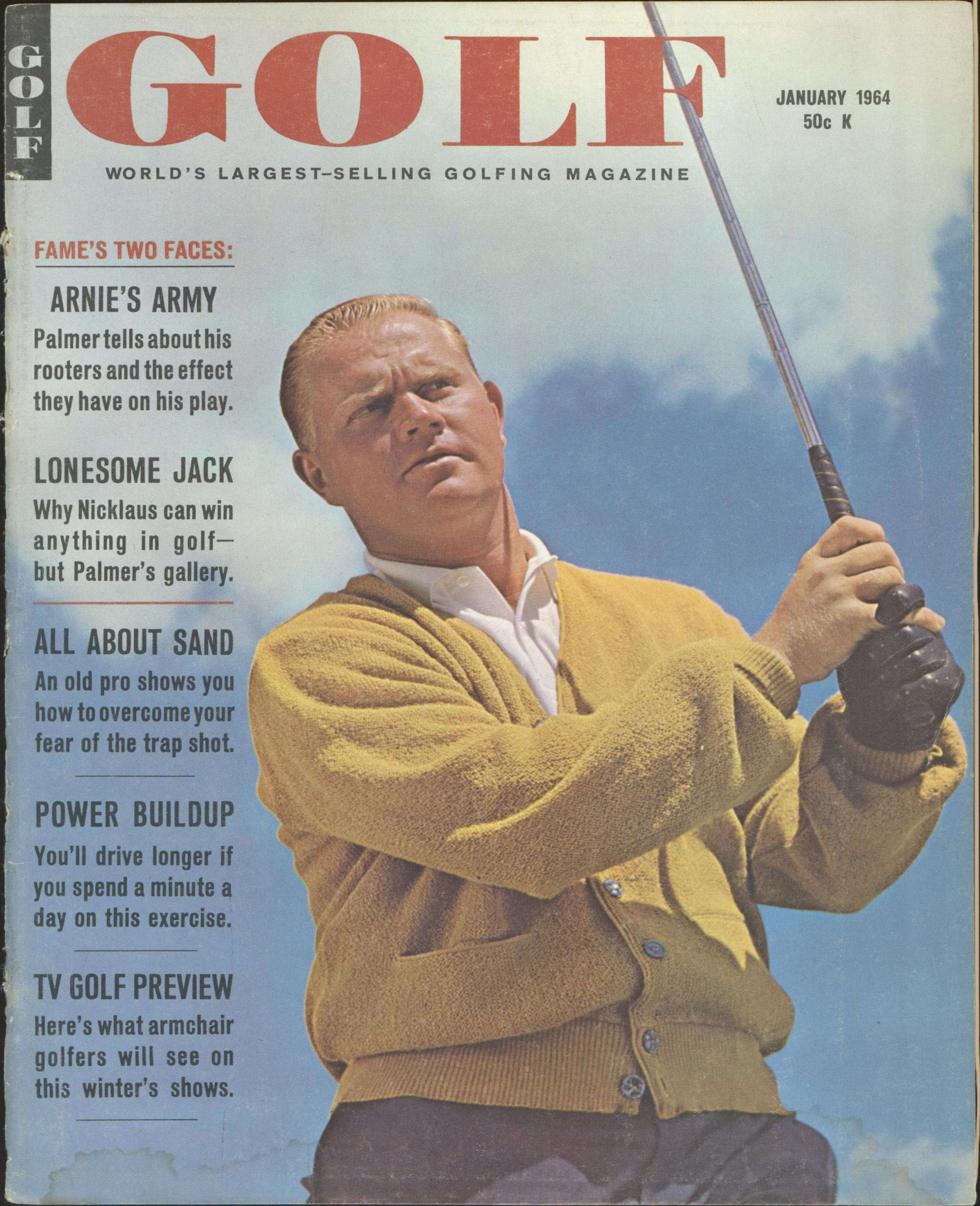
- Issue cover dated January 1964, featuring Jack Nicklaus
- Categories: Golf
- Frequency: Monthly
- Total circulation: 1,214,364 (2024)
- First issue: April 1959; 67 years ago
- Company: EB Golf Media (8AM Golf)
- Country: United States
- Based in: New York City
- Language: English
- Website: golf.com
- ISSN: 1056-5493

Golf Magazine is a monthly golf magazine. One of the first "special interest" magazines of its kind, it was started in April 1959 by Arnold Abramson and Robert Abramson, the owners of Universal Publishing and Distributing Corporation, who sold it to Times Mirror in 1972. Time Inc. acquired it in 2000. It was acquired by Howard Milstein in 2018. It was the world's most widely read golf publication from August 2006 to January 2007. The magazine is for golfers of all skill levels. Some features it includes are instruction from the top 100 teachers in America, interviews with famous golfers, tips on the best values for golf courses to go to on vacation, and an annual club test.

== Top 100 courses ==
Golf Magazine conducts an annual survey of experts to determine the best course in the United States and the world.

=== Top 100 in the United States ===
The best courses in the United States in 2024-25 were:

Rank	Name	Location	Designer, Year
1	Pine Valley	Pine Valley, New Jersey	George Crump/Harry Colt, 1918
2	Cypress Point	Pebble Beach, California	Alister MacKenzie, 1928
3	Shinnecock Hills	Southampton, New York	William Flynn, 1931
4	National Golf Links of America	Southampton, New York	Charles B. Macdonald, 1911
5	Oakmont	Oakmont, Pennsylvania	Henry Fownes, 1903
6	Augusta National	Augusta, Georgia	Alister MacKenzie/Bobby Jones, 1933
7	Sand Hills	Mullen, Nebraska	Bill Coore/Ben Crenshaw, 1995
8	Merion (East)	Ardmore, Pennsylvania	Hugh Wilson, 1912
9	Pebble Beach	Pebble Beach, California	Jack Neville/Douglas Grant, 1919
10	Los Angeles (North)	Los Angeles, California	George C. Thomas Jr., 1927

=== Top 100 in the world ===
Here are the top ten courses in the world in 2025-26:

Rank	Name	Location	Country	Designer, Year
1	Pine Valley	Pine Valley, New Jersey	United States	George Crump/Harry Colt, 1918
2	Cypress Point	Pebble Beach, California	United States	Alister MacKenzie, 1928
3	St Andrews (Old Course)	St Andrews	Scotland	Nature
4	Royal County Down (Championship)	Newcastle, County Down	Northern Ireland	Old Tom Morris, 1889
5	Shinnecock Hills	Southampton, New York	United States	William Flynn, 1931
6	National Golf Links of America	Southampton, New York	United States	C.B. MacDonald, 1911
7	Royal Melbourne (West)	Black Rock, Victoria	Australia	Alister MacKenzie, 1931
8	Augusta National	Augusta, Georgia	United States	Bobby Jones/Alister MacKenzie 1933
9	Oakmont	Oakmont, Pennsylvania	United States	Henry Fownes, 1904
10	Sand Hills	Mullen, Nebraska	United States	Bill Coore/Ben Crenshaw, 1994

== Annual Club Test ==
Golf Magazine also conducts an annual test of some of the finest golf products available so that the golfer will be armed with the knowledge of which club is the best value. As of 2025, the Magazine no longer provides a "rating" nor does it rank each club. Golf Magazine thoroughly reviews all the newest club models on the market with the help of player testers. In the end, it groups the best clubs for 2025 into categories to make your purchasing choice easier. The below table summarizes the type of clubs as well as the categories for each tested for each:

Type of Golf Club	Categories Assessed
Driver	Forgiveness, Speed, Shot Correction, Slower Swinger Speeds, Low Spin Drivers.
Irons	Game Improvement, Better Player, Players Distance, Super Game Improvement Elite Irons.
Fairway Woods	Speed, Forgiveness, Slower Swing Speeds, Low Spin.
Hybrids	Forgiveness, Playability, Shot Correction, Slower Swing Speeds.

== Top 100 Teachers in America ==
Golf Magazine also honours some of the best instructors in the business. On the emeritus list are:

Name	Hometown
Jimmy Ballard	Key Largo, Florida
Peggy Kirk Bell	Southern Pines, North Carolina
Chuck Cook	Austin, Texas
Manuel de la Torre	River Hills, Wisconsin
Michael Hebron	Smithtown, New York
David Leadbetter	Champions Gate, Florida
Eddie Merrins	Los Angeles, California
Dave Pelz	Austin, Texas
Phil Ritson	Winter Garden, Florida
Phil Rodgers	La Jolla, California
Craig Shankland	Daytona Beach, Florida
Dr. Jim Suttie	Naples, Florida
Bob Toski	Coconut Creek, Florida
Dr. Gary Wiren	West Palm Beach, Florida

== 2011 player of the year selection ==
On November 1, 2011, Golf Magazine selected Rory McIlroy over Yani Tseng for its 2011 player of year. The magazine's editor, David Clarke wrote, “We are pleased to name Rory McIlroy as our inaugural Player of the Year.” Americans have embraced this young Northern Irishman, taking him into their hearts not just out of admiration for his amazing talent, but also for the grace he has shown in victory and defeat, his generosity of time with fans, and his commitments to causes beyond golf.”

The McIlroy selection was heavily criticized by golf bloggers. The #1 male player in the world at the time, Luke Donald, tweeted, "So rude and disrespectful of Yani. Whoever had final decision just diminished your magazine."

== See also ==
- Kingdom magazine
