= James Finegan =

James Finegan may refer to:

- James Lysaght Finegan (died 1900), Irish barrister, soldier, merchant and politician
- James W. Finegan (1929–2015), American advertising executive, golfer and sportswriter
