= Tubac Golf Resort and Spa =

Hotel on the site of the former Otero Ranch, Arizona

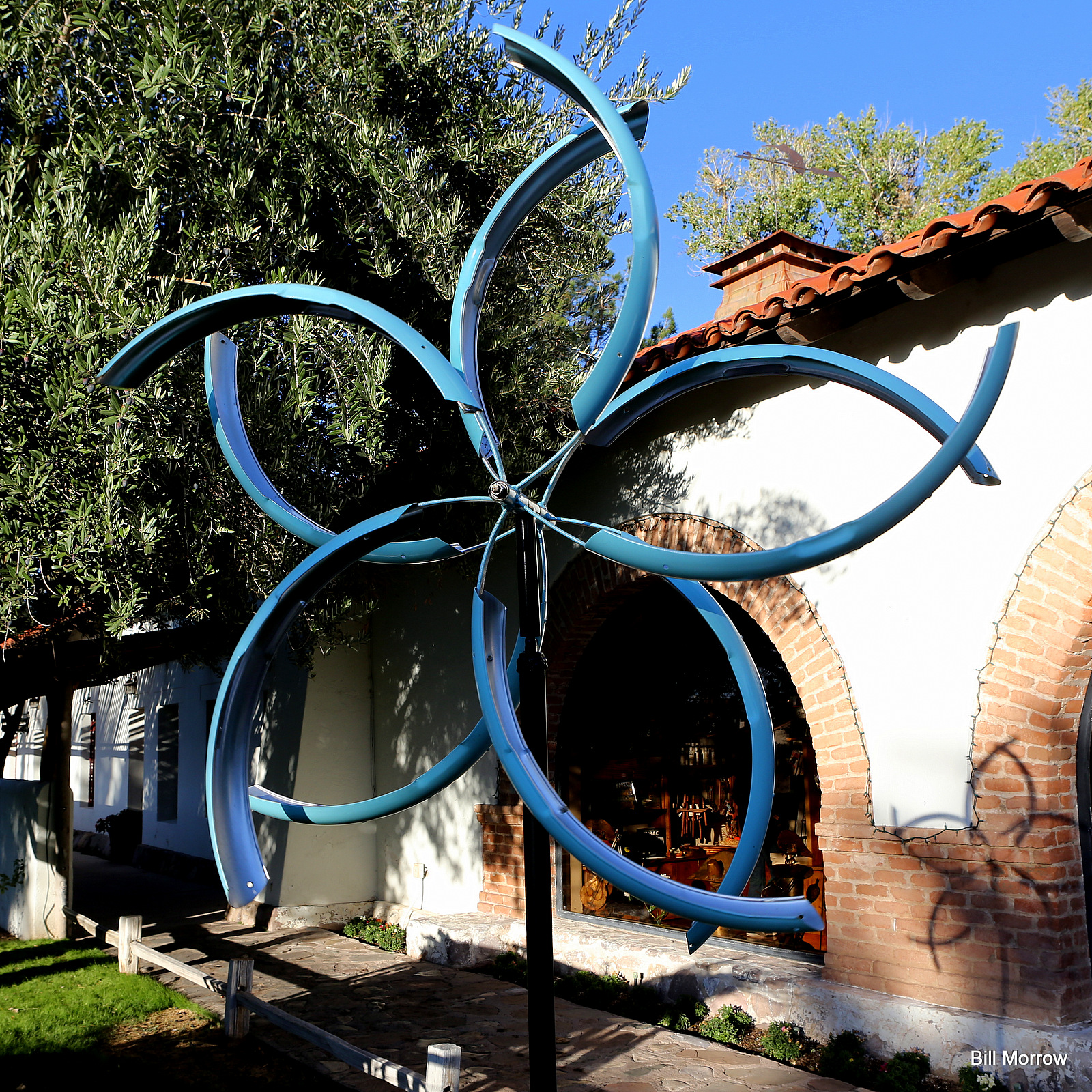
- Interactive map of the Tubac Golf Resort and Spa area

General information
- Location: 65 Avenida de Otero, Tubac, Arizona
- Coordinates: 31.6261°N 111.0439°W
- Completed: 1959

The Tubac Golf Resort and Spa is a historic hotel in Tubac, Arizona, on 500 acres (2.0 km^{2}) of what was the Otero Ranch in Santa Cruz County, Arizona. It was opened as a hotel and golf resort in 1959.

The resort's buildings include an original hacienda and other ranch buildings, a chapel which is a reproduction of a Spanish mission, and guest haciendas. The prevailing architectural style is Spanish Colonial. Its 18-hole original golf course was designed by golf course architect Robert Lawrence. Another 9 holes were added in 2006. The golf course was a principal setting for the 1996 film Tin Cup, starring Kevin Costner as a dissolute golfer.

It has been listed by the National Trust for Historic Preservation as a member of the National Registry of the Historic Hotels of America since 2008.

== Otero Ranch ==
The Otero Ranch became the largest cattle ranch ever in the state of Arizona. It was formed from land grants, the first being the first land grant in Pimería Alta, to Don Toribio de Otero in 1789. The area became part of the United States in the Gadsden Purchase of 1853. The family learned the cattle ranching business while away during the American Civil War and built up a huge herd of cattle in the following years. While large portions of the ranch were sold off after 1914, the original ranch homestead property was held by the Otero family until 1937. Artifacts remain on the Tubac Golf Resort, including the Otero family home and well.

== Tubac Golf Resort ==
The property was purchased by a group of businessmen including Bing Crosby in 1959, who planned to transform the estate into "a luxurious holiday retreat. Debuting as the Tubac Golf Resort and Spa, they had meticulously persevered [sic] its historical integrity throughout the renovation process. The group of investors even began installing a series of golf fairways onsite, making the resort a one-stop destination for avid golfers."

In 1988, the resort was purchased by Albert Kaufman and Robert Zukin. The resort attracted golfers nationally, and director Ron Shelton chose to shoot much of his film, Tin Cup, there in the mid-1990s.

The property was put up for sale after Kaufman died in 2000. After waiting about two years for a competing sale deal to fall through, developer Ron Allred, representing a group of 20 investors, was able to complete a purchase of the property in 2002. In 2002 "Allred said that he likely won't alter the layout of the golf course, stressing that changes to the property will mostly come in the form of upgrades rather than drastic overhauls. 'What we are going to do is renovate some of the existing historic buildings that we want to keep and possibly add on to them,' Allred said. 'The history of this area is what we really want to preserve, and we always do everything with a really high level of quality.'"

Allred had previously developed the Rancho Manana Gold Club in Cave Creek, Arizona and the 3,000-acre Telluride Ski & Golf Co. in Colorado. He intended to make the resort into a "destination resort" for mostly regional customers including those from Mexico.

A spa was added in 2007 and as of 2018 the property comprised approximately 500 acres.
