= Palos Verdes Golf Club =

Golf complex in Palos Verdes, California

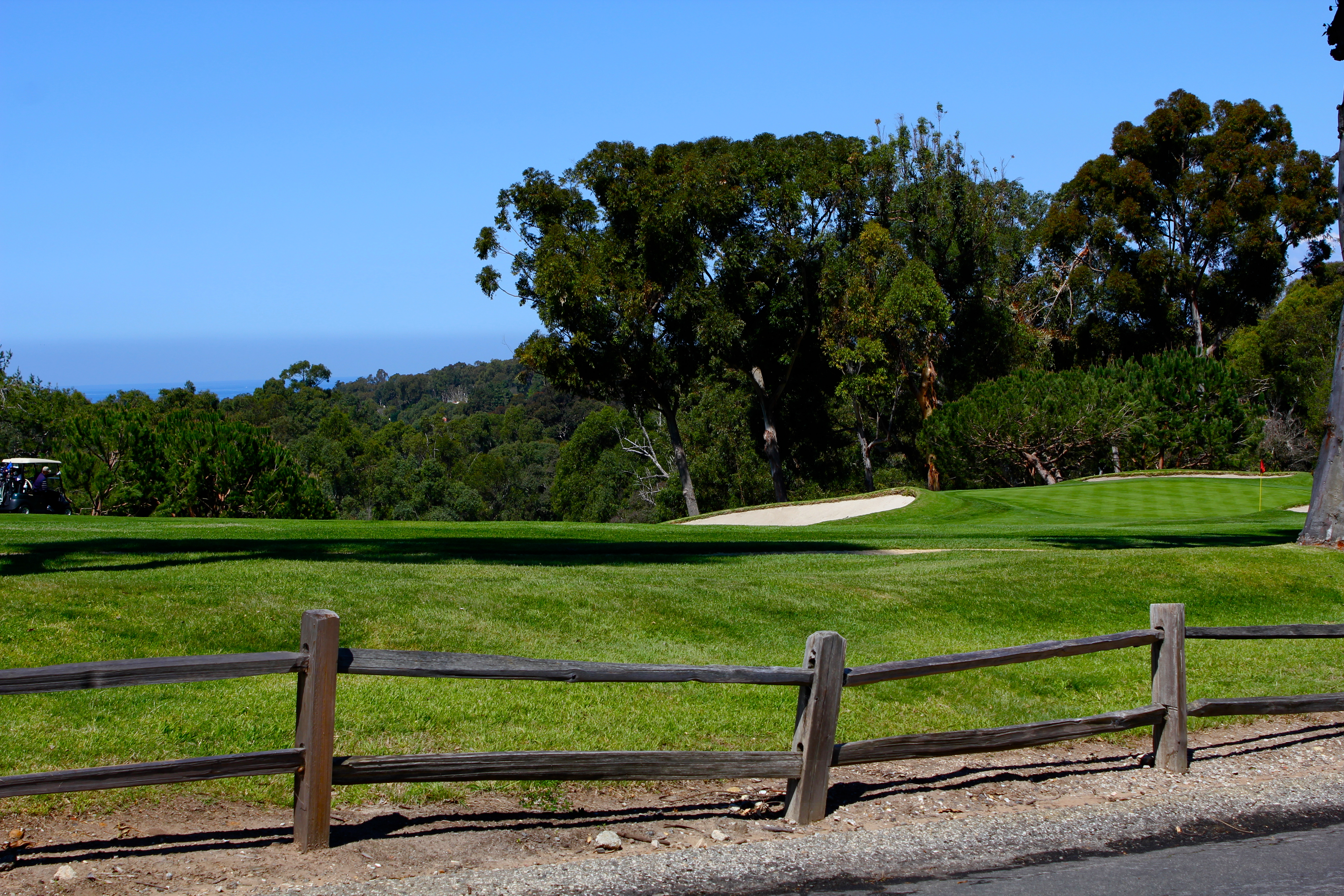
- 11th hole at Palos Verdes Golf Club in 2011

- Location within the United States Location within California
- 33.7955°N 118.373°W

Club information
- Location: 3301 Via Campesina; Palos Verdes Estates, California, U.S.
- Elevation: 600 feet (180 m)
- Established: 1924; 102 years ago
- Type: Private
- Tota holes: 18
- Tournaments: Northrop Grumman Regional Challenge; Palos Verdes Championship
- Greens: Poa annua and bent grass mixture
- Fairways: Kikuyu grass
- Website: www.pvgc.com

Course
- Designed by: Olmsted Brothers, William P. Bell, George C. Thomas
- Par: 71
- Length: 6,433 yards (5,882 m)
- Course rating: 72.7
- Slope rating: 134

Palos Verdes Golf Club is a private golf and social club on the West Coast of the United States, located in Palos Verdes Estates, California, a suburb southwest of Los Angeles.

== History ==
The golf course design began in 1923, and the course was opened in 1924. The club, an amenity for area residents in the newly developed Palos Verdes Project, was designed by Olmsted Brothers together with the architects George C. Thomas and William P. Bell. Many varieties of trees were planted during original construction, which are now very mature and line and narrow the fairways. The land on which the course is situated is owned by the City of Palos Verdes Estates, and the club is operated under a concession agreement with the city.

The clubhouse underwent a major remodel from 2005 to 2007 and is a popular venue for weddings, with expansive views of the Pacific Ocean and variable capacity.

== General information ==
The greens at Palos Verdes are a mixture of Poa annua and bent grass, and the fairways are kikuyu grass. The course has much change in elevation, and can be difficult for some players to walk. Guests may play the course with a member, or verified Residents of Palos Verdes Estates have limited access for a fee. The dress code is strictly enforced and may be found online at pvgc.com. The course sits on 214 acres (0.87 km^{2}), within an 800-acre (3.24 km^{2}) parkland preserve, encompassing several connecting canyons and unmanicured forestland.

Membership is generally restricted to residential property owners in the city of Palos Verdes Estates, and is open to residents of neighboring cities only by sponsorship from an existing member, and when no residents are on the waiting list. Nonresidents of Palos Verdes Estates additionally pay a higher entrance fee. Over the last few years, the waiting list for membership has shortened, allowing residents to join quickly and nonresidents to join within one year.

The club is the site of the annual Northrop Grumman Regional Challenge - an invitational tournament for the top NCAA women's golf teams in the country. In 2022, it hosted the inaugural edition of the LPGA Tour's Palos Verdes Championship.

== The course ==
The course is par 71 and 6,433 yards (5,882 m) from the black tees, 6,197 yards (5,667 m) from the blue tees, 5,691 yards (5,204 m) from the white tees, and 5,434 yards (4,969 m) from the red tees. The men's slope ratings are 72.3/133, 71.2/130 and 68.9/124 for the black, blue, and white tees, respectively.

While not considered lengthy at just under 6,500 yards, the architects' use of the natural terrain, barrancas, creeks, and hills, combined with small greens, extensive bunkering, narrow fairways with strategically designed landing areas, and prevailing westerly ocean breezes, the course presents a challenge for players of all levels. Members have taken great care in preserving the original design and routing of this masterpiece. As of July 2013, the course underwent a fresh $1.5M renovation, restoring some of the lost hole design features and removing hundreds of trees to open up ocean views, and adding modern chipping areas around most greens.

A number of the holes (1, 2, 3, 6, 12, 13, 14) play long, as they are into the prevailing west wind from the Pacific Ocean, less than a mile from the course. Fourteen of the course's eighteen holes feature panoramic views of the Pacific Ocean (a Thomas trademark).

The front nine is a "perfect nine" - where no two holes in a row are of the same par.

The course record post-renovation (black tees) is 61; the long-standing record from the blue tees pre-2013 is 59.

=== Scorecard ===
Palos Verdes Golf Club
Tee	Rating/Slope	1	2	3	4	5	6	7	8	9	Out	10	11	12	13	14	15	16	17	18	In	Total
Men's Black	72.3 / 133	392	208	413	226	522	338	561	155	386	3201	364	362	283	418	439	145	486	330	405	3232	6433
Men's Blue	71.2 / 130	363	200	389	210	502	330	531	147	369	3041	357	362	263	418	416	135	474	330	401	3156	6197
Women's Blue	77.6 / 141	363	200	389	210	502	330	531	147	369	3041	357	362	263	418	416	135	474	330	401	3156	6197
Par		4	3	4	3	5	4	5	3	4	35	4	4	4	4	4	3	5	4	4	36	71
SI		5	15	1	13	7	9	11	17	3		10	8	14	4	2	18	16	12	6
Men's White	68.9 / 124	355	179	374	193	474	317	494	137	343	2866	342	355	130	404	334	118	440	322	380	2825	5691
Women's White	75.1 / 138	355	179	374	193	474	317	494	137	343	2866	342	355	130	404	334	118	440	322	380	2825	5691
Par		4	3	4	3	5	4	5	3	4	35	4	4	3	4	4	3	5	4	4	35	70
SI		5	15	1	13	7	9	11	17	3		10	12	16	2	14	18	6	8	4
Women's Red	73.4 / 134	334	173	350	182	430	309	460	127	328	2693	335	347	125	387	329	110	424	311	373	2741	5434
Women's Gold	69.7 / 125	305	85	298	159	373	263	330	110	260	2183	324	291	120	337	263	46	302	207	343	2233	4416
Par		4	3	4	3	5	4	5	3	4	35	4	4	3	4	4	3	5	4	4	35	70
SI		5	15	1	13	7	9	11	17	3		10	12	16	2	14	18	6	8	4
