= John Pillsbury =

John Pillsbury may refer to:

- John E. Pillsbury (1846–1919), U.S. naval officer who became a rear admiral
- John S. Pillsbury (1827–1901), governor of Minnesota and co-founder of the Pillsbury company
- John Sargent Pillsbury Jr. (1912–2005), American attorney, insurance executive and community leader
- John Sargent Pillsbury Sr. (1878–1968), American businessman and industrialist
