= Hugh Irvine Wilson =

American golf course architect (1879–1925)

Hugh Irvine Wilson (November 13, 1879 - February 3, 1925) was a golf course designer. He is most famous for designing Merion Golf Club, consistently ranked among the top golf courses in the USA. Wilson also finished the last four holes at the famous Pine Valley Golf Club.

Wilson, along with A.W. Tillinghast, George C. Thomas, Jr., William Flynn, George Crump, and William Fownes together made up the "Philadelphia School" of golf course architecture. Together, the group designed over 300 courses, 27 of which are on in the top 100 golf courses in the world.

== Career ==
Wilson was born in Trenton, New Jersey to Lt. Col. William Potter Wilson & Ellen Stover Dickson Wilson and was very talented at golf. A Princeton University freshman at 18, he won the first course championship at Aronimink Golf Club in Philadelphia, Pennsylvania. After being chosen to design Merion Golf Club in 1911, he spent seven months in Scotland and England in 1910 developing ideas. He admitted that many concepts built into the Merion design came from this trip, including the 3rd hole on the East course being inspired by North Berwick Golf Club's 15th and 17th holes.

== Courses designed ==
The following courses were designed by Hugh Wilson:

=== Public ===
- Cobbs Creek Golf Club (Olde Course) - Philadelphia, Pennsylvania
- Seaview Marriott Resort (Bay Course) - Absecon, New Jersey - Work did not include placement of bunkers.

=== Private ===
- Merion Golf Club (East Course) - Ardmore, Pennsylvania
- Merion Golf Club (West Course) - Ardmore, Pennsylvania
- Phoenixville Country Club (9 holes) - Phoenixville, Pennsylvania
