= Desert Forest Golf Club =

Golf course and club in Carefree, Arizona

Coordinates: 33.822°N 111.901°W

- Interactive map of Desert Forest Golf Club

Club information
- Location: Carefree, Arizona
- Established: 1962
- Type: Private
- Tota holes: 18
- Tournaments: 1990 U.S. Senior Amateur, 2007 U.S. Women's Mid-Amateur; 2024 Pac-12 Men's Conference Championship
- Website: Desert Forest Golf Club
- Designed by: Robert "Red" Lawrence
- Par: 72
- Length: 7,201 yards

Desert Forest Golf Club is a par-72 golf course and club located in Carefree, Arizona. The course is 7201 yards long and located underneath Black Mountain in the Sonoran Desert.

== History ==
Desert Forest Golf Club, Carefree, Arizona, was designed by Robert "Red" Lawrence in 1961 and established in 1962, becoming the first desert golf layout in the Southwestern United States and earning its designer the nickname of "Desert Fox". The course was created as a part of the development plans of club founders K.T. Palmer and Tom Darlington, who created the town of Carefree north of Scottsdale in the early 1950s. The course is located in the Sonoran Desert at an elevation of about 2400–3000 feet. Very little earth was moved in the creation of the course, resulting in narrow, rolling fairways that follow the natural terrain. It is considered to be the first course in the western deserts to incorporate the desert itself into the course design, instead of imposing eastern designs onto the desert landscape. According to Scott Gummer of Links Magazine, "Beyond the boundary markers [the designer] staked, nothing was to be touched. Everything was—and remains today—in play, from the saguaro, ocotillo, prickly pear and myriad other varieties of cactus to the javelinas, coyotes, roadrunners and rattlesnakes that call the desert home."

Golfweek has consistently ranked Desert Forest among the 50 best golf courses in the United States. Then in 2009 Golf Magazine ranked Desert Forest as the 35th best in the world on its list of the 50 Greatest Courses of the Last 50 Years, making it the only course in the state of Arizona to make that list. Author Jeff Barr named Desert Forest's holes number 7, 13, and 16 as among the most important holes in golf in his book 1001 Golf Holes You Must Play Before You Die. Over time the course has also ranked among the best in the US according to Golf Digest Magazine, which began keeping a list of America's 100 Greatest Golf Courses (first as America's 100 Most Testing Courses) in 1969, a list on which Desert Forest has appeared for a total of 17 of the years since. This makes it one of the most consistently ranked golf courses by the magazine in America.

In 2013 Golf Course Architect David Zinkand was engaged to create a new Master Plan for the golf course, and to oversee subsequent construction. The golf course was rebuilt from tee to green, including state of the art infrastructure. Changes and enhancements were made to accommodate the modern game, while staying true to the original Red Lawrence routing and use of the desert. Zinkand has created a masterful update of this classic American golf course.

== National Championship Tournaments ==
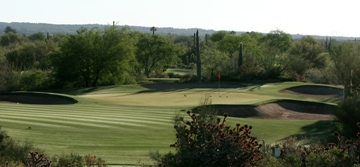
17th Hole of the Desert Forest Golf Course

In 1990 Desert Forest hosted the USGA Senior Amateur Championship, over the week of October 15 to October 20, 1990. The winner of the tournament was Jackie Cummings, who won a semi-final match against Rick Jones after eliminating the 1988 Senior Amateur Champion Clarence Moore in the quarter-finals. Cummings became the youngest winner in the history of the championship at that time, winning at age 55 by defeating fellow finalist Bobby Clark.

Over the week of September 29 to October 4, 2007, Desert Forest hosted the U.S. Women's Mid-Amateur. The winner of the stroke-play event was Dawn Woodard, defeating runner-up Virginia Grimes by two strokes after shooting a 70 in the first round and a 74 in the second. The winner of the match-play event was Meghan Bolger, who defeated finalist Kerry Postillion (a Desert Forest member) 1-up in the championship round. The course has also hosted several other U.S. Mid-Amateur and U.S. Women's Mid-Amateur qualifiers previously. The course is also a previous host to other major tournaments including the Goldwater Cup on several occasions and the Phoenix Silver Pro AM in 1994.
