= James W. Finegan =

American advertising executive, golfer and sportswriter

- Born: November 21, 1929
- Died: March 13, 2015 (aged 85); Villanova, Pennsylvania, U.S.
- Education: La Salle University
- Occupations: Advertising executive, golfer and sportswriter
- Known for: author of 7 books about golf
- Spouse: Harriet Finegan
- Children: 3

James W. Finegan (November 21, 1929 – March 13, 2015) was an American advertising executive, golfer and sportswriter. He was the author of seven books about golf.

== Early life ==
Finegan was born in 1929. He was a caddie for publisher Samuel Irving Newhouse Sr. as a child. He graduated from La Salle University in 1951, where he played on the golf team. He served in the United States Navy for four years.

== Career ==
Finegan worked in advertising, first as a copywriter and eventually the chairman and chief executive officer of Gray & Rogers. He entered golf competitions and won prizes from the Philadelphia Country Club, the Pine Valley Golf Club, and the Bethpage Black Course. He authored seven books about golf. Five of his books were about golf in the British Isles. Another book was about the Pine Valley Golf Club, and another book was about golf in his home state of Pennsylvania.

Finegan was inducted into the La Salle University Hall of Athletes in 1977. According to Michael Bamberger writing for Golf Magazine, Finegan "shaped the lives of an incalculable number of caddies, golfers and American pilgrims looking to discover golf in Great Britain, and he was a beloved figure in the game wherever golf took him."

== Personal life and death ==
Finegan married Harriet Burke on November 15, 1952. They had three children, and they resided in Villanova, Pennsylvania.

Finegan died on March 13, 2015, in Villanova, Pennsylvania.

== Selected works ==
- Finegan, James W. (1996). A Centennial Tribute to Golf in Philadelphia: The Champions and the Championships, the Clubs and the Courses. Philadelphia: Golf Association of Philadelphia. OCLC 39013952.
- Finegan, James W. (2000). Pine Valley Golf Club: A Unique Haven of the Game. Pine Valley, New Jersey: Pine Valley Golf Club. OCLC 1011908429.
- Finegan, James W. (2006). Where Golf Is Great: The Finest Courses of Scotland and Ireland. New York: Artisan. ISBN 9781579652715. OCLC 67405718.
- Finegan, James W. (2007). Emerald Fairways and Foam-flecked Seas: A Golfer's Pilgrimage to the Courses of Ireland. New York: Simon & Schuster. ISBN 9781416532989. OCLC 78618433.
- Finegan, James W. (2010). Scotland: Where Golf Is Great. New York: Artisan. ISBN 9781579654283. OCLC 815972223.
- Finegan, James W. (2010). All Courses Great And Small: A Golfer's Pilgrimage to England and Wales. New York: Simon & Schuster. ISBN 9781439104255. OCLC 869432078.
- Finegan, James W. (1996). Blasted Heaths and Blessed Greens: A Golfer's Pilgrimage to the Courses of Scotland. New York: Simon & Schuster. ISBN 9781416585510. OCLC 892925984.
- Emerald Fairways & Foam-Flecked Seas: A Golfer's Pilgrimage to the Courses of Ireland (1996)
