= Huntingdon Valley Country Club =

Golf club in Huntingdon Valley, Pennsylvania

Coordinates: 40.135686°N 75.094095°W

- Interactive map of Huntingdon Valley Country Club

Club information
- Location: Upper Moreland Township, Montgomery County, at Huntingdon Valley, Pennsylvania, near Philadelphia, Pennsylvania
- Established: 1897
- Type: Private
- Tota holes: 27
- Website: Huntingdon Valley Country Club

Toomey Nine
- Designed by: William S. Flynn
- Par: 35
- Length: 3,444
- Course rating: 36.3

Flynn Nine
- Designed by: William S. Flynn
- Par: 35
- Length: 3,443
- Course rating: 37.2

Centennial Nine
- Designed by: William S. Flynn
- Par: 35
- Length: 3,618
- Course rating: 38.8

The Huntingdon Valley Country Club is a golf, tennis and swim club located in Huntingdon Valley, Pennsylvania, 7 miles (11 km) northeast of Philadelphia. In addition to a golf course, the club offers banquet and dining facilities. The course resides on 170 acres (0.69 km^{2}), and is ranked as the #8 golf course in Pennsylvania and #3 course in the Philadelphia area by Golf Digest. The golf course is rated as #79 best classic course in America by Golfweek Magazine (2013).

== History ==
Huntingdon Valley Country Club was organized in June 1897. It was originally a nine-hole course and was subsequently expanded to 18 holes after acquiring additional land. The course was later moved to its present site in the mid-1920s. Play started on the 27-hole layout on April 14, 1928.

Huntingdon Valley Country Club also was known as one of the first places to play the sport of squash. Huntingdon Valley Country Club started one of the first tournaments for Squash in the early 1900s.

== Scorecard ==
Centennial Nine
| Tee | Rating/Slope | 1 | 2 | 3 | 4 | 5 | 6 | 7 | 8 | 9 | Total |
| Green | 38.8/141 | 393 | 141 | 465 | 434 | 448 | 433 | 602 | 213 | 389 | 3518 |
| Red | 36.7/146 | 386 | 141 | 423 | 429 | 401 | 420 | 573 | 196 | 381 | 3350 |
| Black | 34.6/136 | 347 | 127 | 411 | 360 | 360 | 275 | 551 | 169 | 354 | 2954 |
| White | 34.4/128 | 288 | 113 | 363 | 284 | 352 | 261 | 458 | 122 | 340 | 2581 |
| Gold | 34.4/128 | 271 | 101 | 363 | 284 | 352 | 261 | 458 | 122 | 340 | 2552 |
| Par | | 4 | 3 | 4 | 4 | 4 | 4 | 5 | 3 | 4 | 35 |
| SI | Men | 6 | 9 | 3 | 4 | 2 | 8 | 1 | 7 | 5 |
| SI | Women | 6 | 9 | 5 | 4 | 1 | 7 | 2 | 8 | 3 |

Toomey Nine (Out) / Flynn Nine (In)
| Tee | Rating/Slope | 1 | 2 | 3 | 4 | 5 | 6 | 7 | 8 | 9 | Out | 10 | 11 | 12 | 13 | 14 | 15 | 16 | 17 | 18 | In | Total |
| Green | 74.9/138 | 386 | 450 | 233 | 366 | 187 | 451 | 605 | 467 | 460 | 3605 | 405 | 377 | 449 | 201 | 471 | 575 | 401 | 228 | 486 | 3593 | 7198 |
| Red | 73.8/136 | 378 | 433 | 212 | 345 | 179 | 436 | 567 | 405 | 436 | 3391 | 396 | 371 | 395 | 172 | 454 | 564 | 397 | 207 | 439 | 3395 | 6786 |
| Black | M: 71.2/134 W: 77.9/146 | 364 | 402 | 182 | 316 | 150 | 418 | 540 | 363 | 415 | 3150 | 368 | 360 | 355 | 159 | 427 | 549 | 363 | 199 | 386 | 3166 | 6316 |
| White | M: 68.5/127 W: 74.5/138 | 332 | 387 | 145 | 284 | 126 | 359 | 505 | 332 | 381 | 2851 | 346 | 309 | 321 | 131 | 391 | 501 | 324 | 189 | 355 | 2867 | 5718 |
| Gold | M: 66.5/123 W: 71.5/135 | 278 | 323 | 117 | 254 | 126 | 359 | 415 | 267 | 275 | 2414 | 346 | 309 | 321 | 102 | 391 | 414 | 324 | 135 | 267 | 2609 | 5023 |
| Par | Men | 4 | 4 | 3 | 4 | 3 | 4 | 5 | 4 | 4 | 35 | 4 | 4 | 4 | 3 | 4 | 5 | 4 | 3 | 4 | 35 | 70 |
| Par | Women | 4 | 5 | 3 | 4 | 3 | 4 | 5 | 4 | 4 | 36 | 4 | 4 | 4 | 3 | 5 | 5 | 4 | 3 | 5 | 37 | 73 |
| SI | Men | 9 | 1 | 17 | 13 | 15 | 11 | 7 | 5 | 3 | | 8 | 10 | 16 | 12 | 2 | 6 | 14 | 18 | 4 |
| SI | Women | 7 | 9 | 15 | 13 | 17 | 11 | 1 | 5 | 3 | | 10 | 12 | 2 | 18 | 8 | 4 | 14 | 16 | 6 |
