= Robert Lawrence (golf course architect) =

Robert "Red" Lawrence
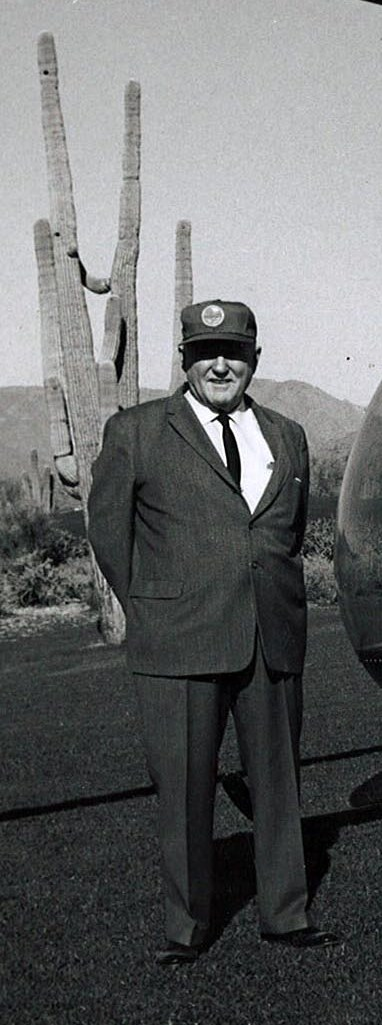
- Born: 1893; White Plains, New York
- Died: July 27, 1976 (aged 82–83)
- Occupation: Golf course architect

Robert "Red" Lawrence was an American golf course architect, largely producing courses in the US states of Arizona and New Mexico.

== Life and career ==
Lawrence was born in White Plains, New York, in 1893. He began his career in 1919, as layout engineer of Westchester Country Club in Rye, New York, becoming part of what is known as the second generation of major American golf course designers. He is also known as a member of the "Philadelphia School" of golf course design, and was involved in the re-design of the original and premier example of this school the Merion Golf Club in Ardmore, Pennsylvania. In his early career, Lawrence was largely under the tutelage of William S. Flynn between 1921 and 1932, serving as the course architect's design assistant. He then became the manager of several important golf and country clubs, before becoming a full-time golf course architect. Lawrence was a founding member of the American Society of Golf Course Architects in 1946. By the age of 65 he moved from his residency in Boca Raton, Florida, to Arizona, where he became a prolific architect of western American golf courses.

In 1962 he earned the additional moniker "Desert Fox" for his design of the Desert Forest Golf Club, the world's first course built entirely in the desert. At Desert Forest, the Championship Golf Course at the University of New Mexico, and other courses, he is known for building a course using the natural terrain of the area and including the original aspects of the region in the design. In 1974 Lawrence designed an 18-hole addition to The Wigwam golf club, a course that was eventually named the "Red" course in honor of his long-term nickname. His golf courses at the Tubac Golf Resort & Spa were featured in the 1996 Kevin Costner film Tin Cup. Lawrence died in Tucson on July 27, 1976, at the age of 83, and inducted into the Arizona Golf Hall of Fame posthumously in 2003.

== Golf courses ==
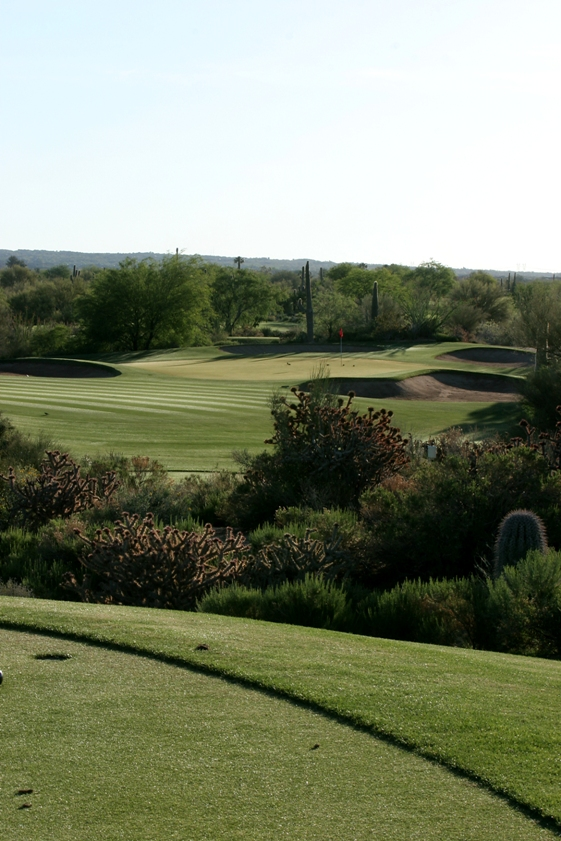
The 17th hole of the Desert Forest Golf Club, designed by Robert "Red" Lawrence

The following are examples of golf courses designed by Lawrence (the list does not include every course he designed):

- Championship Golf Course at the University of New Mexico (Albuquerque, New Mexico); designed the 18-hole course in 1966.
- The Country Club in Pepper Pike, Ohio; assistant designed in 1931.
- Country Club of Green Valley (Green Valley, Arizona); designed the 18-hole course in 1971.
- Desert Forest Golf Club (Carefree, Arizona); designed 18-hole course in 1962.
- Diplomat Resort Country Club (Hallandale, Florida); designed the 18-hole course in 2000.
- Dobson Ranch Golf Course (Mesa, Arizona); designed the 18-hole course in 1974.
- Fountain of the Sun Country Club (Mesa, Arizona); designed the 18-hole course in 1971.
- Havasu Island Golf Course (Lake Havasu City, Arizona); designed the 18-hole course in 1964.
- Huntingdon Valley Country Club (Abingdon, Pennsylvania); assistant designed in 1927.
- Merion Golf Club (Ardmore, Pennsylvania)); assistant designer in 1921-32.
- Miami Shores Country Club (Village of Miami Shores) Designed 1939- 18 hole golf course and WPA project
- Kino Springs Golf Course (Nogales, Arizona); designed the 18-hole course in 1974.
- Philadelphia Country Club (Montgomery County, Pennsylvania); assistant designed in 1927.
- Seaview Golf Club-Pines Course (Abescon, New Jersey)); assistant designed in 1931.
- Sunset Golf Club (Hollywood, Florida); designed the 18-hole course in 1953.
- The Cascades at the Homestead Resort (Hot Springs, Virginia); associate designer.
- Tres Rios Golf Course (Estrella Mountain Park, Arizona); designed the 18-hole course in 1962.
- Tucson Estates Country Club & Golf Course (Tucson, Arizona); designed the 18-hole course in 1972.
- Tubac Golf Resort & Spa (Tucson, Arizona); designed the original 18-hole course in 1959.
- Westchester Country Club (Rye, New York; layout engineer.
- The Wigwam (Litchfield Park, Arizona); designed the 18-hole "Red" Course in 1974.
