= Cypress Point Club =

Private golf club in California

- Location in the United States Location in California
- 36.58°N 121.974°W

Club information
- Location: Pebble Beach, California
- Elevation: 80 feet (24 m)
- Established: 1928; 98 years ago
- Type: Private
- Total holes: 18
- Website: cpcmack.org
- Designed by: Alister MacKenzie and Robert Hunter
- Par: 72
- Length: 6,554 yards (5,993 m)
- Course rating: 73.1
- Slope rating: 141
- Course record: 63 – Jim Langley, Ben Hogan, and others
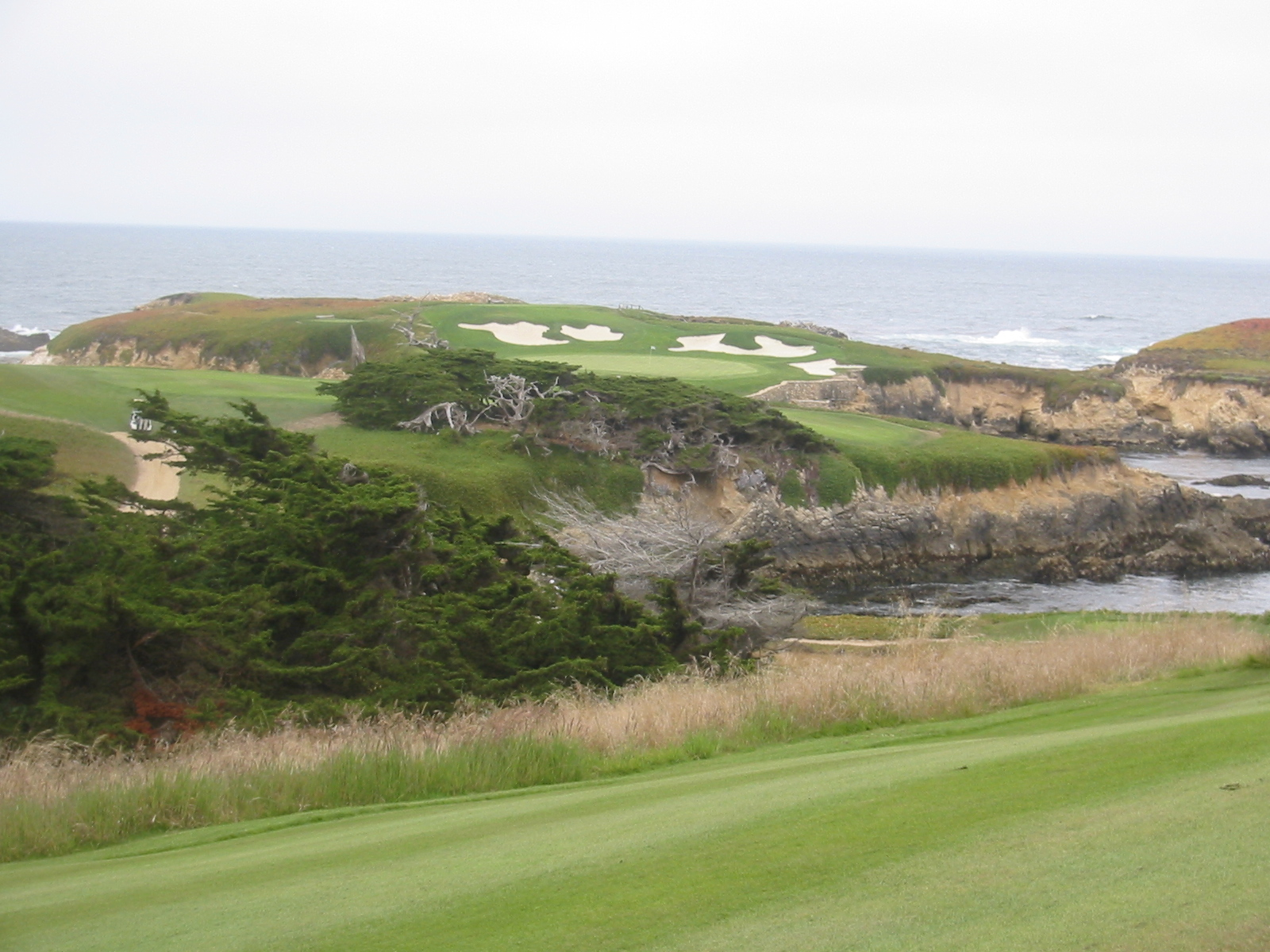
- View of 16th green from clubhouse in 2004

Cypress Point Club is a private golf club located in Pebble Beach, California, at the northern end of the Central Coast. Its single 18-hole course has been named as one of the finest in golf, best known for a series of dramatic holes along the Pacific Ocean.

== History ==
The course was designed in 1929 by golf course designer Alister MacKenzie, collaborating with fellow golf course architect Robert Hunter. It opened on August 11 that year.

The Cypress Point clubhouse was designed by George Washington Smith of Santa Barbara and decorated by artist and member Francis McComas and Frances Elkins. It opened in 1929 and is mostly unchanged from the original design. The club has 250 members.

Cypress Point is one of five golf clubs that participates in an annual rotating-venue members-only golf tournament known as SCAPS; the other clubs are Seminole Golf Club, Augusta National Golf Club, Pine Valley Golf Club, and San Francisco Golf Club.

== Golf course ==
Set in coastal dunes, the course's front nine enter the Del Monte forest, reemerging on the rocky coastline for the back nine. The signature hole is #16, which requires a 230-yard (210 m) tee shot over the Pacific to a mid-sized green guarded by strategically placed bunkers.

Cypress Point Club was ranked #1 on Top100GolfCourses.com list of best golf courses in the US and #3 on Golf Digest's 2025 list of America's 100 Greatest Golf Courses.

The golf course is considered one of the most exclusive in the world. Non-members require the invitation of a member to play.

== PGA Tour ==
From 1947 through 1990 Cypress Point was on the PGA Tour as part of the multi-course AT&T Pebble Beach Pro-Am, founded by entertainer Bing Crosby. It was dropped from the rotation because it had no non-white members and refused to admit one to comply with the tour's anti-discrimination guidelines. Since then, Condoleezza Rice was admitted as a member of the club.

While no longer part of the AT&T Pebble Beach Pro-Am, many of the players continue to visit the course in the week leading up to the tournament.

== Scorecard ==
Cypress Point Club
Tee	Rating/Slope	1	2	3	4	5	6	7	8	9	Out	10	11	12	13	14	15	16	17	18	In	Total
Championship	73.1 / 141	420	549	156	383	491	521	170	369	289	3,348	476	440	404	394	393	135	233	386	343	3,204	6,552
Regular	72.1 / 139	407	535	151	370	472	509	159	342	283	3,228	476	427	397	344	384	120	218	374	326	3,066	6,249
Par	Men's	4	5	3	4	5	5	3	4	4	37	5	4	4	4	4	3	3	4	4	35	72
SI	Men's	5	1	17	7	11	3	15	9	13		16	4	2	14	8	18	6	10	12
Red		409	510	142	366	416	475	155	319	247	3,039	480	401	310	285	323	119	208	355	296	2,777	5,816
Par	Women's	5	5	3	4	5	5	3	4	4	38	5	5	3	4	4	3	4	4	4	36	74
SI	Women's	11	1	17	7	5	3	13	9	15		2	10	8	14	6	18	16	4	12
