= William Flynn (golfer) =

American golf course architect (1890–1944)

William Stephen Flynn (December 25, 1890 – January 24, 1944) was an American golf course architect during the early part of the 20th century. Flynn is most noted for designing Shinnecock Hills Golf Club on Long Island and Cherry Hills Country Club, Huntingdon Valley Country Club, Lancaster Country Club, and for his work at the Merion Golf Club.

Flynn, along with A.W. Tillinghast, George C. Thomas, Jr., Hugh Wilson, George Crump, and William Fownes together made up the "Philadelphia School" of golf course architecture. Together, the group designed over 300 courses, 27 of which are on in the top 100 golf courses in the world.

== Life and career ==
Flynn was born in Milton, Massachusetts. He graduated from Milton High School, where he had played interscholastic golf and competed against his friend Francis Ouimet. He laid out his first course at Heartwellville, Vermont, in 1909 working under the direction of his brother in law Frederick Pickering who was considered the “king of golf course constructors” in the beginning of the century. Pickering constructed the first Merion Course and William Flynn worked for him at the time. Although Pickering was supposed to construct the Merion East after a disagreement, Flynn was hired to assist Hugh Wilson with completion of the East Course at Merion Golf Club in Ardmore, Pennsylvania. He worked as the construction supervisor at Merion and remained on as superintendent for a short time, helping establish the course.

Flynn continued his involvement with Merion for 25 years, perfecting the course. He and Wilson had hoped to form a design partnership, but Wilson's failing health prevented it. Instead, Flynn partnered with Howard Toomey just after World War I with Flynn the designer and Toomey handling the engineering side of the work. They started their own golf architectural firm, Toomey & Flynn. William Gordon, Robert Lawrence and Dick Wilson all started out as assistants with the firm of Toomey and Flynn and all later became prominent designers in their own right. Flynn was particularly active around Philadelphia, Pennsylvania, producing numerous highly rated courses which compete with each other for attention. Although his body of work is found around Philadelphia, his most recognizable work is outside the area at places like Cherry Hills Country Club in Denver, The Cascades in Virginia, The Country Club in Brookline, Massachusetts, Woodcrest Country Club in Cherry Hill, New Jersey and Shinnecock Hills on Long Island. In 1927, Flynn added the Primrose nine at The Country Club. Three holes from the Primrose are used on the course's Composite Course for the U.S. Open, but much of Flynn's renovation work at The Country Club goes unnoticed.

The climax of Flynn's career would be Shinnecock Hills Golf Club, where he had his finest site and certainly produced his greatest work. Toomey and Flynn were hired to redesign the original course in 1931 with the addition of new land to build the back nine. Flynn kept only two holes from the original course in a total makeover. Shinnecock is praised for its beautiful routing and Flynn's use of the natural terrain. It is currently ranked third in Golf Digest's 100 Greatest Courses Ranking, the highest of any course Flynn was involved in. Flynn died at the age of 53 in Philadelphia.

== Courses designed by Flynn ==
- Atlantic City Country Club - Atlantic City, New Jersey
- Bala Golf Club - Philadelphia, Pennsylvania
- Beaver Dam Golf Club - Prince George's, Maryland
- Boca Raton Resort North Course (later replaced by Boca Country Club) - Boca Raton, Florida
- Boca Raton Resort South Course - Boca Raton, Florida
- Brinton Lake Club (Now Concord Country Club) - Concordville, Pennsylvania
- Burning Tree Club (Construction) - Bethesda, Maryland
- Cascades Golf Course (Homestead Resort) - Hot Springs, Virginia
- Robert Cassatt Estate Course - Bryn Mawr, Pennsylvania
- Cherry Hills Country Club - Cherry Hills Village, Colorado
- Cleveland Heights Country Club - Lakeland, Florida
- Cobb's Creek Golf Club (Co-design) - Philadelphia, Pennsylvania
- Concord Country Club Chadds Ford, Pennsylvania
- The Country Club - Brookline, Massachusetts
- The Country Club - Pepper Pike, Ohio
- The Country Club of Harrisburg - Harrisburg, Pennsylvania
- The Country Club of Virginia (Plans for 36 holes) - Richmond, Virginia
- The Country Club of York (Plans for 18 holes) - York, Pennsylvania
- Denver Country Club (Redesign) - Denver, Colorado
- Doylestown Country Club (9 holes) - Doylestown, Pennsylvania
- Eagles Mere Country Club (Redesign 6 existing holes, Design remaining 12/ also designed 11 holes of a second course that was never finished and abandoned) - Eagles Mere, Pennsylvania
- Elyria Country Club - Elyria, Ohio
- Floranada South Course - Floranada, Florida
- Friendship Golf Course (Edward McLean Estate Course) - Washington, DC
- Glen View Club (Redesign) - Golf, Illinois
- Green Valley Country Club - Lafayette Hill, Pennsylvania
- Gulph Mills Golf Club (Construction) - Gulph Mills, Pennsylvania
- The Homestead Golf Course (Redesign) – Hot Springs, Virginia
- Huntingdon Valley Country Club – Huntingdon Valley, Pennsylvania
- Indian Creek Country Club – Indian Creek Village, Florida
- Indian Spring Country Club - Silver Springs, Maryland
- Kilkare Course (William Plunkett Private Course) - Heartwellville, Vermont
- The Kittansett Club – Marion, Massachusetts
- Lancaster Country Club – Lancaster, Pennsylvania
- Lehigh Country Club – Allentown, Pennsylvania
- Manor Country Club – Rockville, Maryland
- JF Manne Miniature Golf Course - Ocean City, NJ
- Manufacturers Golf & Country Club – Oreland, Pennsylvania
- Marble Hall Golf Course (Now Green Valley Country Club) – Lafayette Hill, Pennsylvania
- McCall Field Club - Philadelphia, Pennsylvania
- Merion Golf Club East Course (Design and Redesign) - Ardmore, Pennsylvania
- Merion Golf Club West Course (Design and Redesign) - Ardmore, Pennsylvania
- Miami Beach Polo Club (Plans for 18 holes) - Miami Beach, Florida
- Mill Road Farm Golf Course (Albert Lasker Private Course) - Lake Forest, Illinois
- Monroe Country Club (9 holes) - Monroe, New York
- Normandy Shores Golf Club - Normandy Shores, Florida
- North Hills Country Club (Redesign) - North Hills, Pennsylvania
- Ole Monterey Golf Club - Roanoke, Virginia
- Onondaga Golf and Country Club (Redesign) - Fayetteville, New York
- Opa Locka Golf Course - Opa Locka, Florida
- Overbrook Country Club (Redesign) - Overbrook, Pennsylvania
- Penn Athletic Club Indoor Course - Philadelphia, Pennsylvania
- Pepper Pike Club – Pepper Pike, Ohio
- Philadelphia Country Club – Gladwyne, Pennsylvania
- Philadelphia Cricket Club (Redesign) - Flourtown, Pennsylvania
- Philmont Country Club North Course (Redesign) - – Huntingdon Valley, Pennsylvania
- Pine Meadow Golf Course - Mundelein, Illinois
- Pine Valley Golf Club (Redesign) - Pine Valley, New Jersey
- Plymouth Country Club (9 holes) - Plymouth, North Carolina
- Plymouth Country Club – Plymouth Meeting, Pennsylvania
- Pocantico Hills Golf Course (Rockefeller Private Course) - Tarrytown, New York
- Pocono Manor East Course (Design and Redesign) - [Pocono Manor, Pennsylvania]
- Rock Creek Park Golf Course - Washington, DC
- Rolling Green Golf Club – Springfield, Pennsylvania
- Seaview Country Club Pines Course (9 holes) - Galloway, New Jersey
- Sewell's Point Country Club (Now Norfolk Country Club) - Norfolk, Virginia
- Shinnecock Hills Golf Club – Shinnecock Hills, New York
- The Springhaven Club (Redesign) - (Wallingford, Pennsylvania)
- Springdale Golf Club (Redesign) - Princeton, New Jersey
- Sunnehanna Country Club (Redesign 3-holes) - Sunnehanna, Pennsylvania
- Sunnybrook Golf Club (Design and Redesign) - Lafayette Hill, Pennsylvania
- Town and Country Club (Now Woodmont Country Club) - Rockville, Maryland
- U.S. Naval Academy Golf Club – Annapolis, Maryland
- Wampanoag Country Club (Redesign) - Swansea, Massachusetts
- Washington Golf and Country Club (Design and Redesign) - Arlington, Virginia
- Westchester Biltmore Country Club (Now Westchester Country Club) (Construction and Redesign) - Westchester, New York
- Whitemarsh Valley Country Club (Redesign) - Whitemarsh Township, Pennsylvania
- Women's National Golf and Tennis Club (Now Glen Head Country Club) (Redesign) - Glen Head, New York
- Woodcrest Country Club – Cherry Hill, New Jersey
- Woodward Estate Golf Course (Dr. G. Woodward Private Course) - Chestnut Hill, Pennsylvania
- Yorktown Country Club River View Course - Yorktown, Virginia
- Yorktown Country Club Lake View Course (Plans for 18 holes) - Yorktown, Virginia
