= Palos Verdes Championship =

Women's professional golf tournament

Coordinates: 33.7955°N 118.373°W

Tournament information
- Location: Los Angeles, California U.S.
- Established: 2022
- Course: Palos Verdes Golf Club (2022)
- Par: 71
- Length: 6,506 yards (5,949 m)
- Tour: LPGA Tour
- Format: Stroke play – 72 holes
- Prize fund: $3.0 million
- Month played: April

Tournament record score
- Aggregate: 274 Marina Alex (2022)
- To par: −10 as above

Current champion
- (United States) Marina Alex

Location map
- Location in the United States Location in California

The Palos Verdes Championship was a women's professional golf tournament in California on the LPGA Tour. The inaugural event in 2022 was played at Palos Verdes Golf Club in Palos Verdes Estates, concluding May 1.

== Tournament names ==
- 2022: Palos Verdes Championship

== Winners ==
Year	Winner	Score	To par	Margin of victory	Runner(s)-up	Purse ($)	Winner's share ($)
2022	(United States) Marina Alex	70-68-70-66=274	−10	1 stroke	(South Korea) Ko Jin-young	1,500,000	225,000

== Tournament records ==
Year	Player	Score	Round
2022	Minjee Lee	63 (−8)	1st
