= 1950 U.S. Open (golf) =

Coordinates: 40.001°N 75.312°W

Tournament information
- Dates: June 8–11, 1950
- Location: Ardmore, Pennsylvania
- Course(s): Merion Golf Club, East Course
- Organized by: USGA
- Tour: PGA Tour

Statistics
- Par: 70
- Length: 6,694 yards (6,121 m)
- Field: 150 players, 52 after cut
- Cut: 149 (+9)
- Prize fund: $15,000
- Winner's share: $4,000

Champion
- (United States) Ben Hogan
- 287 (+7), playoff

Location in the United States
Location in Pennsylvania

The 1950 U.S. Open was the 50th U.S. Open, held June 8–11 at the East Course of Merion Golf Club in Ardmore, Pennsylvania, a suburb northwest of Philadelphia. In what became known as the "Miracle at Merion," 1948 champion Ben Hogan won the second of his four U.S. Open titles in an 18-hole playoff over 1946 champion Lloyd Mangrum and George Fazio, just 16 months after being severely injured in an automobile accident. It was the fourth of Hogan's nine major titles.

Lee Mackey established a new tournament record by shooting a 64 in the first round, but followed that up with an 81 and finished in 25th place. His score of 64 was not bettered in any other major championship for 23 years, until Johnny Miller closed with a 63 at the U.S. Open in 1973 to win at Oakmont. Al Brosch, who carded a 67 in the first round, shot an 84 in the second round to miss the cut by two strokes. Tommy Armour, three-time major champion and winner in 1927, played in his final major and missed the cut.

This was the second U.S. Open played at Merion's East Course, which previously hosted sixteen years earlier in 1934, won by Olin Dutra. Opened in 1912, the course was the site of the U.S. Amateur in 1916, 1924, and 1930; the first was the debut of Bobby Jones at age 14 (quarterfinalist) and the latter two he won. The 1930 victory was the fourth and final leg of his grand slam.

Hogan made his U.S. Open debut at Merion in 1934 at age 21. He shot 79 (+9) twice and missed the 36-hole cut by three strokes. He made his first cut at the U.S. Open in 1939 and did not miss another; his last was in 1967 at age 54.

== Course ==
East Course

Hole	1	2	3	4	5	6	7	8	9	Out	10	11	12	13	14	15	16	17	18	In	Total
Yards	360	555	195	595	425	435	360	367	185	3,477	335	378	400	133	443	395	445	230	458	3,217	6,694
Par	4	5	3	5	4	4	4	4	3	36	4	4	4	3	4	4	4	3	4	34	70

== Round summaries ==
=== First round ===
Thursday, June 8, 1950

Place	Player	Score	To par
1	(United States) Lee Mackey	64	−6
2	(United States) Al Brosch	67	−3
T3	(United States) Skip Alexander	68	−2
T3	(United States) Julius Boros	68	−2
T5	(United States) Harold Williams	69	−1
T5	(United States) Henry Williams, Jr.	69	−1
T7	(United States) Pat Abbott	71	+1
T7	(United States) John Barnum	71	+1
T7	(United States) Al Besselink	71	+1
T7	(Australia) Jim Ferrier	71	+1
T7	(United States) Claude Harmon	71	+1
T7	(United States) Loddie Kempa	71	+1
T7	(United States) Joe Kirkwood, Jr.	71	+1
T7	(United States) Jack Mallon	71	+1
T7	(United States) Cary Middlecoff	71	+1
T7	(United States) Henry Picard	71	+1
T7	(United States) Denny Shute	71	+1

==== Scorecard ====
Hole	1	2	3	4	5	6	7	8	9	10	11	12	13	14	15	16	17	18
Par	4	5	3	5	4	4	4	4	3	4	4	4	3	4	4	4	3	4
(United States) Mackey	E	E	E	−1	−1	−1	−2	−3	−3	−3	−4	−4	−5	−5	−6	−6	−5	−6

=== Second round ===
Friday, June 9, 1950

Place	Player	Score	To par
1	(United States) Dutch Harrison	72-67=139	−1
T2	(United States) Julius Boros	68-72=140	E
T2	(United States) Johnny Bulla	74-66=140	E
T2	(Australia) Jim Ferrier	71-69=140	E
5	(United States) Ben Hogan	72-69=141	+1
T6	(United States) Skip Alexander	68-74=142	+2
T6	(United States) Lloyd Mangrum	72-70=142	+2
T6	(United States) Cary Middlecoff	71-71=142	+2
T6	(United States) Henry Picard	71-71=142	+2
T6	(United States) Skee Riegel	73-69=142	+2
T6	(United States) Bob Toski	73-69=142	+2

=== Third round ===
Saturday, June 10, 1950 (morning)

Place	Player	Score	To par
1	(United States) Lloyd Mangrum	72-70-69=211	+1
2	(United States) Dutch Harrison	72-67-73=212	+2
T3	(United States) Ben Hogan	72-69-72=213	+3
T3	(United States) Cary Middlecoff	71-71-71=213	+3
T3	(United States) Johnny Palmer	73-70-70=213	+3
6	(Australia) Jim Ferrier	71-69-74=214	+4
7	(United States) Henry Ransom	72-71-73=216	+6
T8	(United States) Julius Boros	68-72-77=217	+7
T8	(United States) George Fazio	73-72-72=217	+7
T8	(United States) Bill Nary	73-70-74=217	+7

=== Final round ===
Saturday, June 10, 1950 (afternoon)

Mangrum began the final round with a one-shot lead over Dutch Harrison and a two-stroke lead over Hogan, defending champion Cary Middlecoff, and Johnny Palmer. Fazio was the first to post 287 (+7) after an even-par 70. Mangrum struggled early in his round, carding six bogeys on the first seven holes and shot 76 (+6), which also left him at 287. Hogan had a chance to win the tournament in regulation but missed a short putt for par at 15 and then bogeyed the par-3 17th. In a three-way tie for the lead going to the difficult 18th, Hogan hit one of his most famous shots, a 1-iron approach to 40 feet (12 m). He two-putted for par to join Mangrum and Fazio in the Sunday playoff. Middlecoff and Palmer both shot 79 and fell to tenth place.

Place	Player	Score	To par	Money ($)
T1	(United States) Ben Hogan	72-69-72-74=287	+7	Playoff
T1	(United States) Lloyd Mangrum	72-70-69-76=287	+7	Playoff
T1	(United States) George Fazio	73-72-72-70=287	+7	Playoff
4	(United States) Dutch Harrison	72-67-73-76=288	+8	800
T5	(Australia) Jim Ferrier	71-69-74-75=289	+9	500
T5	(United States) Joe Kirkwood, Jr.	71-74-74-70=289	+9	500
T5	(United States) Henry Ransom	72-71-73-73=289	+9	500
8	(United States) Bill Nary	73-70-74-73=290	+10	350
9	(United States) Julius Boros	68-72-77-74=291	+11	300
T10	(United States) Cary Middlecoff	71-71-71-79=292	+12	225
T10	(United States) Johnny Palmer	73-70-70-79=292	+12	225

==== Scorecard ====
Hole	1	2	3	4	5	6	7	8	9	10	11	12	13	14	15	16	17	18
Par	4	5	3	5	4	4	4	4	3	4	4	4	3	4	4	4	3	4
(United States) Hogan	+3	+3	+4	+4	+4	+4	+4	+4	+4	+4	+4	+5	+5	+5	+6	+6	+7	+7
(United States) Mangrum	+2	+3	+2	+3	+4	+5	+6	+6	+6	+6	+6	+6	+6	+6	+7	+7	+7	+7
(United States) Fazio	+7	+6	+7	+7	+7	+7	+8	+8	+8	+8	+8	+8	+7	+8	+7	+7	+7	+7
(United States) Harrison	+3	+2	+4	+5	+5	+5	+5	+6	+7	+7	+7	+8	+8	+8	+8	+8	+8	+8
(Australia) Ferrier	+7	+6	+7	+7	+7	+7	+8	+8	+8	+8	+9	+9	+9	+9	+10	+9	+9	+9
(United States) Middlecoff	+3	+4	+4	+5	+7	+7	+7	+6	+6	+8	+8	+8	+8	+8	+9	+11	+12	+12
(United States) Palmer	+4	+4	+5	+5	+7	+8	+8	+8	+8	+8	+9	+10	+11	+11	+11	+11	+11	+12

Cumulative tournament scores, relative to par

=== Playoff ===
Sunday, June 11, 1950

The three players were within one stroke of each other as late as the 13th hole, with Hogan at even par and Fazio and Mangrum at one-over. Fazio bogeyed four of the last five holes to fall out of contention, while Hogan led Mangrum by a single stroke through 15. Mangrum's tee shot at 16 went into heavy rough but his third shot stopped 15 feet (4.6 m) from the hole. As he putted to save par, he picked up his ball to remove a bug that had landed on it, a violation of the rules (then rule 10, paragraph 2). Mangrum rolled it in, but was assessed a two-stroke penalty at the next tee; the double-bogey allowed Hogan to cruise to a four-stroke victory. Hogan had just one bogey, while Fazio had seven and Mangrum four, plus the double-bogey for the rules violation.

Place	Player	Score	To par	Money ($)
1	(United States) Ben Hogan	69	−1	4,000
2	(United States) Lloyd Mangrum	73	+3	2,500
3	(United States) George Fazio	75	+5	1,000

- This was the final three-way playoff at the U.S. Open that determined a third-place finisher; at the next in 1963, non-winners tied for second.

==== Scorecard ====
Hole	1	2	3	4	5	6	7	8	9	10	11	12	13	14	15	16	17	18
Par	4	5	3	5	4	4	4	4	3	4	4	4	3	4	4	4	3	4
(United States) Hogan	E	E	E	E	E	E	−1	E	E	E	E	E	E	E	E	E	−1	−1
(United States) Mangrum	E	−1	E	E	E	E	E	E	E	+1	E	+1	+1	+2	+1	+3	+3	+3
(United States) Fazio	+1	E	E	E	E	+1	+2	+1	+1	+1	+1	+1	+1	+2	+3	+4	+4	+5

Birdie	Bogey	Double bogey
