= Lancaster Country Club =

Private country club in Pennsylvania, USA

Coordinates: 40°03′42″N 76°16′15″W

- Interactive map of Lancaster Country Club

Club information
- Location: Lancaster, Pennsylvania
- Established: 1900
- Type: Private
- Owner: Member-Owned
- Tota holes: 27 Holes
- Tournaments: 2015 U.S. Women's Open; 2024 U.S. Women's Open
- Greens: Bent (A1/A4)
- Fairways: Bent
- Website: www.lancastercc.com

Meadowcreek, Dogwood and Highlands
- Designed by: William Flynn
- Par: 70
- Length: 6840 yards
- Course rating: 73.0 (Meadowcreek/Dogwood from Championship Tees)
- Slope rating: 140 (Meadowcreek/Dogwood from Championship Tees)

The Lancaster Country Club is a private American country club that is located in Lancaster, Pennsylvania. This club was the host venue for the U.S. Women's Open in 2015 and 2024.

== History and notable features ==
The Pennsylvania Open in 2002 and 2007, local qualifying for the 2008 U.S. Women's Open, and many amateur tournaments have also been held at the club.

The course was designed by William Flynn. Wayne Morrison, Flynn historian and author of The Nature Faker, named the Lancaster Country Club as Flynn's first great golf course.

Lancaster has three distinct nine-hole courses named Meadowcreek, Dogwood, and Highlands. The Old Course, which the U.S. Women's Open was contested, is made up of the Meadowcreek and Dogwood nines. In 2007, golf architects Ron Forse and Jim Nagle restored Lancaster's design back to Flynn's original plans.

The club is located outside the northeast limits of Lancaster city, partly in Manheim Township and (across the Conestoga River) partly in East Lampeter Township, both in Lancaster County, Pennsylvania.
