= William C. Fownes Jr. =

American golfer (1877–1950)

Personal information
- Full name: William Clark Fownes Jr.
- Nationality: United States
- Born: October 2, 1877 Chicago, Illinois, U.S.
- Died: July 4, 1950 (aged 72) Oakmont, Pennsylvania, U.S.

Career
- Sport: Golf
- College: Massachusetts Institute of Technology
- Status: Amateur

Best results in major championships (wins: 1)
- PGA Championship: DNP
- U.S. Open: T11: 1913
- The Open Championship: DNP
- U.S. Amateur: Won: 1910

William Clark "W. C." Fownes Jr. (October 2, 1877 – July 4, 1950) was an American amateur golfer.

== Career ==
His father, Henry C. Fownes, founded and designed Oakmont Country Club.

In Western Pennsylvania, Fownes was the dominant force in regional play. He won eight Western Pennsylvania Amateur Championships and finished runner-up on five other occasions. His eight West Penn Amateur victories was a record for over a century, until Sean Knapp won his 9th West Penn Amateur in 2023. From 1901 to 1916, Fownes reached the finals in 13 of 16 years. He also won two Western Pennsylvania Open Championships, nearly 20 years apart.

He also won the Pennsylvania Amateur four times.

Fownes appeared in 26 U.S. Amateurs in his career, with the highlight coming in 1910 when he won at The Country Club in Brookline, Massachusetts. He defeated Chick Evans (winner in 1916 and 1920) in the semi-finals, 1 up, after being down two with four holes to play. He then defeated Warren Wood in the final, 4 and 3. He reached the quarterfinals on eight occasions, and reached the semifinals five times.

Fownes helped restart international golf matches following World War I. In 1919 and 1920, he captained an American team that played the best amateurs in Canada. The United States won both of those events. In 1921, Fownes captain informal matches between the United States and amateurs from Great Britain, with the Americans winning 9 to 3. This was the precursor to the Walker Cup, for which he served as the first United States captain when the event debuted in 1922. He guided the team to victory and played again on the team in 1924.

Fownes joined the United States Golf Association Executive Committee in 1924, when he served as Vice President. He was elected president for 1926 to 1927.

Fownes, along with A. W. Tillinghast, George C. Thomas, Jr., Hugh Wilson, George Crump, and William Flynn together made up the "Philadelphia School" of golf course architecture. Together, the group designed over 300 courses, 27 of which are in the top 100 golf courses in the world.

Fownes, along with his father, were members of The Tin Whistles. He won the Tin Whistle Championship in 1912, and served as the organization's president in 1949.

== Amateur wins ==
- 1904 Western Pennsylvania Amateur, Western Pennsylvania Open
- 1905 Western Pennsylvania Amateur
- 1907 Western Pennsylvania Amateur
- 1909 Western Pennsylvania Amateur
- 1910 **U.S. Amateur**, Pennsylvania Amateur, Western Pennsylvania Amateur
- 1911 Western Pennsylvania Amateur
- 1912 Pennsylvania Amateur
- 1913 Pennsylvania Amateur, Western Pennsylvania Amateur
- 1916 Pennsylvania Amateur, Western Pennsylvania Amateur
- 1921 Western Pennsylvania Open

Note: major championships in bold

== Major championships ==
=== Wins ===
Year	Championship	Winning Score	Runner-Up
1910	U.S. Amateur	4 & 3	Warren Wood

=== Results timeline ===
Tournament	1901	1902	1903	1904	1905	1906	1907	1908	1909	1910
U.S. Amateur	R16	DNQ	R128	DNQ	SF	DNQ	SF	QF	QF	**1**
Tournament	1911	1912	1913	1914	1915	1916	1917	1918	1919	1920
U.S. Amateur	R32	R16	R32	SF	R32	R32	NT	NT	SF	QF
Tournament	1921	1922	1923	1924	1925	1926	1927	1928	1929	1930
U.S. Amateur		R16	R16	DNQ	R16	R16	DNQ	DNQ		DNQ

Fownes earned qualifying co-medalist honors at the 1914 U.S. Amateur and medalist honors at the 1916 U.S. Amateur.

Win
Top 10
Did not play

DNQ = did not qualify for match play
NT = no tournament
R128, R64, R32, R16, QF, SF = round in which Fownes lost in match play

== U.S. national team appearances ==
- Walker Cup: 1922 (winners, playing captain), 1924 (winners)
