= George Arthur Crump =

American hotelier and golf course architect (1871–1918)

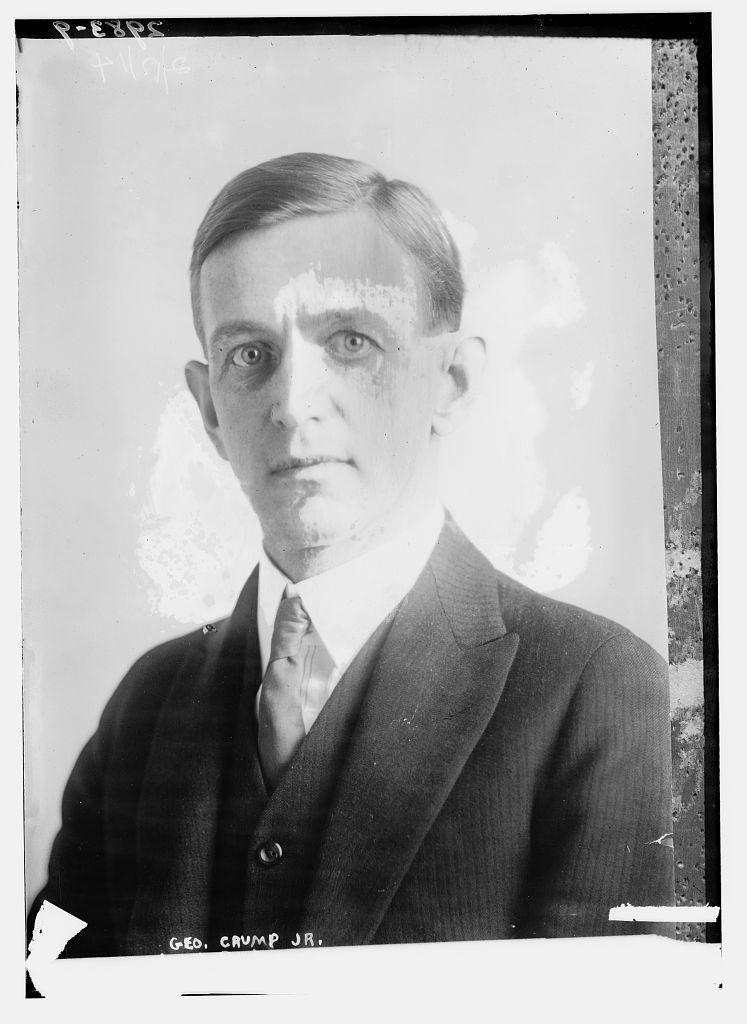

George Arthur Crump, Jr. (September 24, 1871 – January 24, 1918) was a hotelier and golf course architect primarily known for designing and building Pine Valley Golf Club, which, at the time of its opening, was considered the most difficult golf course in the world.

Crump, along with A.W. Tillinghast, George C. Thomas, Jr., Hugh Wilson, William Flynn, and William Fownes together made up the "Philadelphia School" of golf course architecture. Together, the group designed over 300 courses, 27 of which are considered to be among the top 100 golf courses in the world.

== Biography ==
Crump was born in Philadelphia in 1871, but spent most of his formative years in Camden and Merchantville, New Jersey. He attended local primary and secondary schools and did not attend college. Crump married Isabelle Henry in 1898; at that time, he listed his profession as the 'Hotel Business'. With the hotel in capable hands, Crump was free to pursue golf and within a few years, he was a fanatic, eventually holding memberships at Philadelphia Country Club, St. David's, Torresdale, Huntingdon Valley Country Club and Atlantic City Country Club.

In 1910 Crump and his friend Joseph Baker embarked on a European trip in order to play and study the premier golf courses of Britain and the Continent. Their itinerary included rounds at St Andrews, Prestwick, Turnberry, Hoylake, Sandwich, Deal, Prince's, Sunningdale, Walton Heath as well as golf courses in France, Switzerland, Austria and Italy.

During the construction of the Pine Valley Golf Club, marshlands had to be drained and approximately 22,000 tree stumps had to be pulled out with special steam-winches and horse-drawn cables. This was all done at a time when many golf courses were still built with minimal earth moving, and the course was called "Crump's Folly" by some.

Crump died on the morning of the January 24, 1918, at his home in Merchantville. The cause of death has been variously reported as suicide and an infected tooth. At the time of his death four holes—12 through 15—were incomplete. Since Crump's death alterations have been made by several other leading golf course designers.

== Legacy ==
The Crump Cup, established in 1922 was named after Crump and is played to this day at Pine Valley Golf Club.
