= George C. Thomas Jr. =

American golf course architect, botanist, and writer (1873-1932)

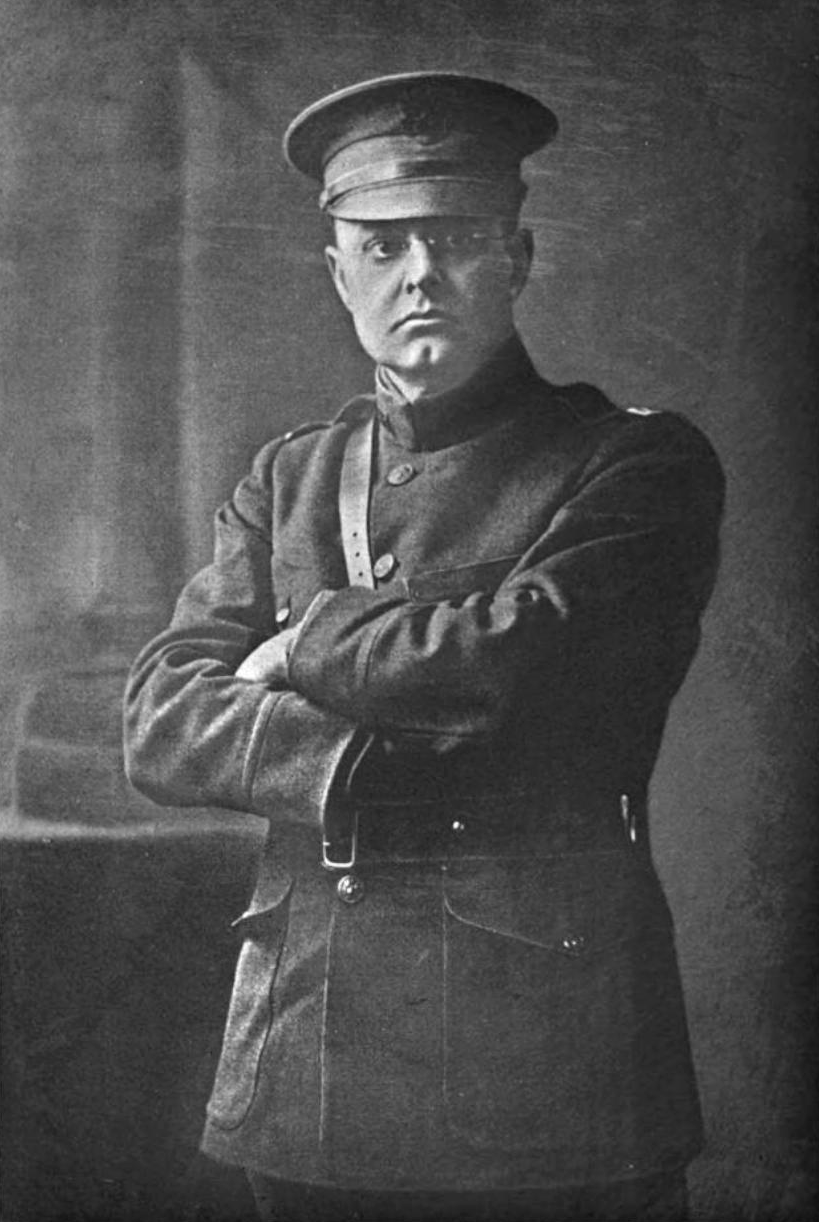
- Born: October 3, 1873; Philadelphia, Pennsylvania, US
- Died: February 23, 1932 (aged 58); Beverly Hills, California, US
- Education: University of Pennsylvania
- Occupations: Golf course architect, botanist, writer
- Spouse: Edna H. Ridge (m. 1901)
- Children: 2

George Clifford Thomas Jr. (October 3, 1873 – February 23, 1932) was an American golf course architect, botanist, and writer. He designed the original course at Whitemarsh Valley Country Club, outside Philadelphia, Pennsylvania; and more than twenty courses in California, including Riviera Country Club in Pacific Palisades and Red Hill Country Club in Rancho Cucamonga.

Thomas, together with A.W. Tillinghast, William Flynn, Hugh Wilson, George Crump, and William Fownes, made up the "Philadelphia School" of golf course architecture. Collectively, the group designed over 300 courses, 27 of which are rated among the top 100 golf courses in the world.

== Biography ==
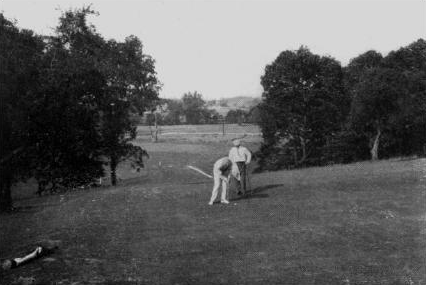
16th hole, Whitemarsh Valley Country Club, Erdenheim, Pennsylvania, 1913

Thomas was born in Philadelphia on October 3, 1873. He attended Episcopal Academy, and graduated from the University of Pennsylvania in 1894. His father was a partner in the investment bank Drexel & Company, where the son worked until 1907. As a teenager, he began designing a golf course on his family's suburban estate, Bloomfield Farm. He sold the course in 1908 to a group of golfers who converted it into Whitemarsh Valley Country Club. He designed a 9-hole course in Marion, Massachusetts, and Spring Lake Golf Club in Spring Lake Heights, New Jersey.

In the 1910s, he was able to observe some of the pioneers of golf course design working near Philadelphia. He was a founding member of Sunnybrook Golf Club, and witnessed Donald Ross's 1914–15 construction of its original course in Flourtown, Pennsylvania. He was friends with Hugh Wilson, who designed Merion Golf Club's original East Course in 1912, and its original West Course in 1914; with George Crump, who designed Pine Valley Golf Club's original course in 1915; and with A. W. Tillinghast, who later designed the Philadelphia Cricket Club's original course in Flourtown. Crump, Tillinghast, Wilson, William Flynn (who constructed Wilson's courses at Merion), and Thomas were masters of the "Philadelphia School" of golf course design, which encouraged high-risk/high-reward play.

He served in the Army Air Service during World War I, attaining the rank of captain. "The Captain" remained his nickname for the rest of his life.

He moved to California in 1919, where he designed the course at La Cumbre Country Club in Santa Barbara. William P. Bell collaborated and supervised its construction. He and Bell later collaborated on courses for Los Angeles Country Club, Ojai Country Club, Bel-Air Country Club, Fox Hills Golf Course, Red Hill Country Club, and others.

In 1926, he published a seminal book, Golf Course Architecture in America, in which he stated the goal behind his work: "When you play a course and remember each hole, it has individuality and change. If your mind cannot recall the exact sequence of the holes, that course lacks the great assets of originality and diversity."

He considered the course at Red Hill Country Club to be his masterpiece. It is the only one of his courses that has never been extensively altered.

=== Dogs and roses ===
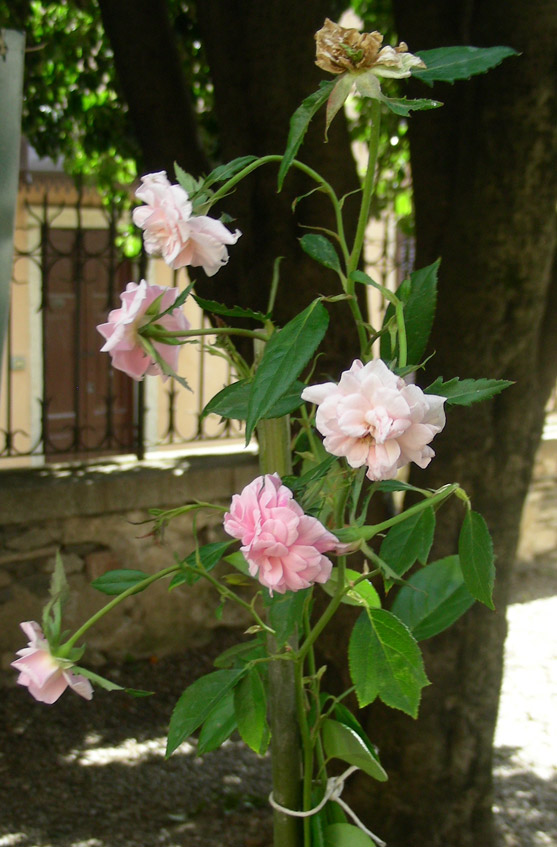
"Bloomfield Abundance Rose", hybridized by Thomas in 1920

He raised English Setters, and was one of the founders of the English Setter Club of America.

In 1912, he began breeding roses on Bloomfield Farm, trying to create a variety that would thrive in Philadelphia's Mid-Atlantic climate. His botanical work continued in California, where he cultivated some 1,200 varieties, including his own "Bloomfield" hybrids. He wrote two books on roses.

=== Family ===
He married Edna H. Ridge in Philadelphia on July 6, 1901. They had two children: George Clifford III, born April 13, 1905; and Josephine Moorehead, born April 14, 1907. Thomas died of a heart attack at their home in Beverly Hills on February 23, 1932.

=== Legacy ===
Geoff Shackelford, a golf course architect and author, wrote a 1995 history of Riviera Country Club and a 1996 biography of Thomas.

In 2008, Thomas was posthumously inducted into the Southern California Golf Association's Hall of Fame.

In 2010, Gil Hanse restored the North Course at Los Angeles Country Club to Thomas's 1921 design. On Golf Digest's 2023 list of the 100 greatest golf courses in America, Riviera Country Club was ranked 19th, and the restored North Course at Los Angeles Country Club was ranked 16th.

In June 2012, the first George C. Thomas Jr. Invitational Tournament was held on the North Course at Los Angeles Country Club.

== Golf courses ==
External videos
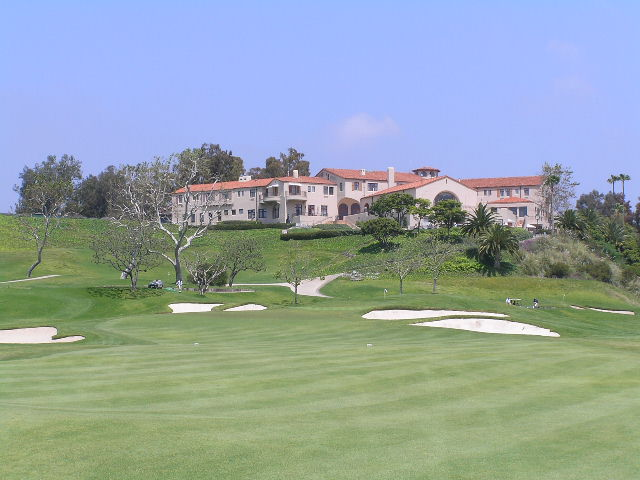
- Hole 1, Riviera (U.S. Open) on YouTube
- George C. Thomas Jr. on YouTube

- Whitemarsh Valley Country Club, Erdenheim, Pennsylvania (1892?-1908).
- Marion Golf Club, Marion, Massachusetts (9 holes, 1900).
- Spring Lake Golf Club, Spring Lake Heights, New Jersey (1911).
- La Cumbre Country Club, Santa Barbara, California (1920, with William P. Bell, demolished).
- Red Hill Country Club, Rancho Cucamonga, California (9 holes, 1921 and 9 holes with William P. Bell, 1946).
- North Course, Los Angeles Country Club, Los Angeles, California (1921 redesign, with Herbert Fowler; 1927-28 redesign, with William P. Bell). Now restored to Thomas's 1921 design.
- Saticoy Country Club, Ventura, California (9 holes, 1923). Now Saticoy Regional Golf Course.
- Los Angeles Municipal Courses, Griffith Park, Los Angeles, California (36 holes, 1923). Renamed the Woodrow Wilson and Warren G. Harding Memorial Golf Courses.
- Palos Verdes Golf Club, Palos Verdes Estates, California (1924, Consulted to William P. Bell design).
- Ojai Country Club, Ojai, California (1925, with William P. Bell). Now Ojai Valley Inn & Spa.
- Bel-Air Country Club, Bel Air, Los Angeles, California (1926, with William P. Bell).
- Riviera Country Club, Pacific Palisades, California (1927, with William P. Bell).
- Fox Hills Golf Course, Culver City, California (1927, with William P. Bell, demolished). Now the site of Culver City Shopping Mall.
- Stanford University Golf Course, Stanford, California (1930, with William P. Bell).
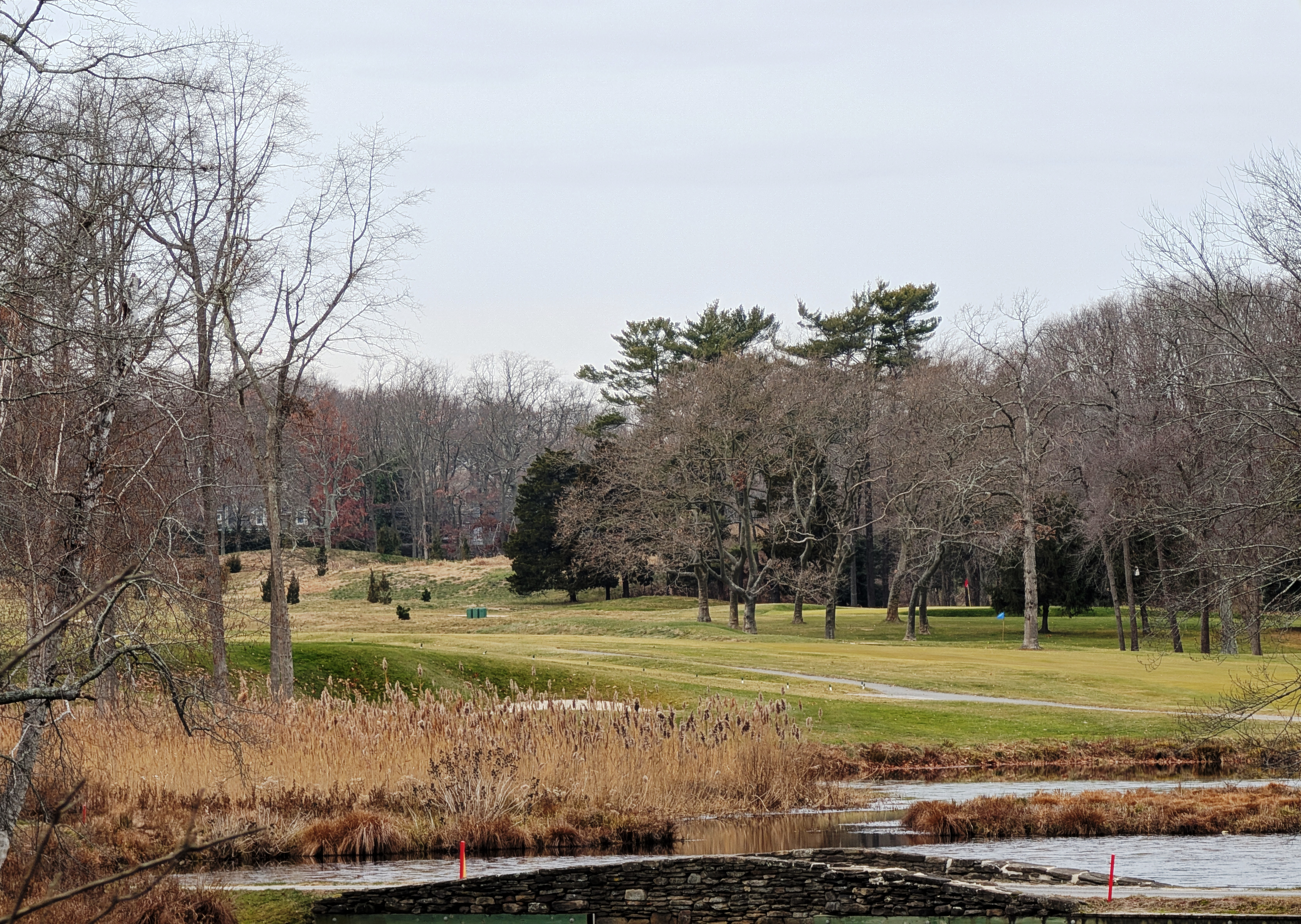
Spring Lake Golf Club (1911), Spring Lake Heights, New Jersey

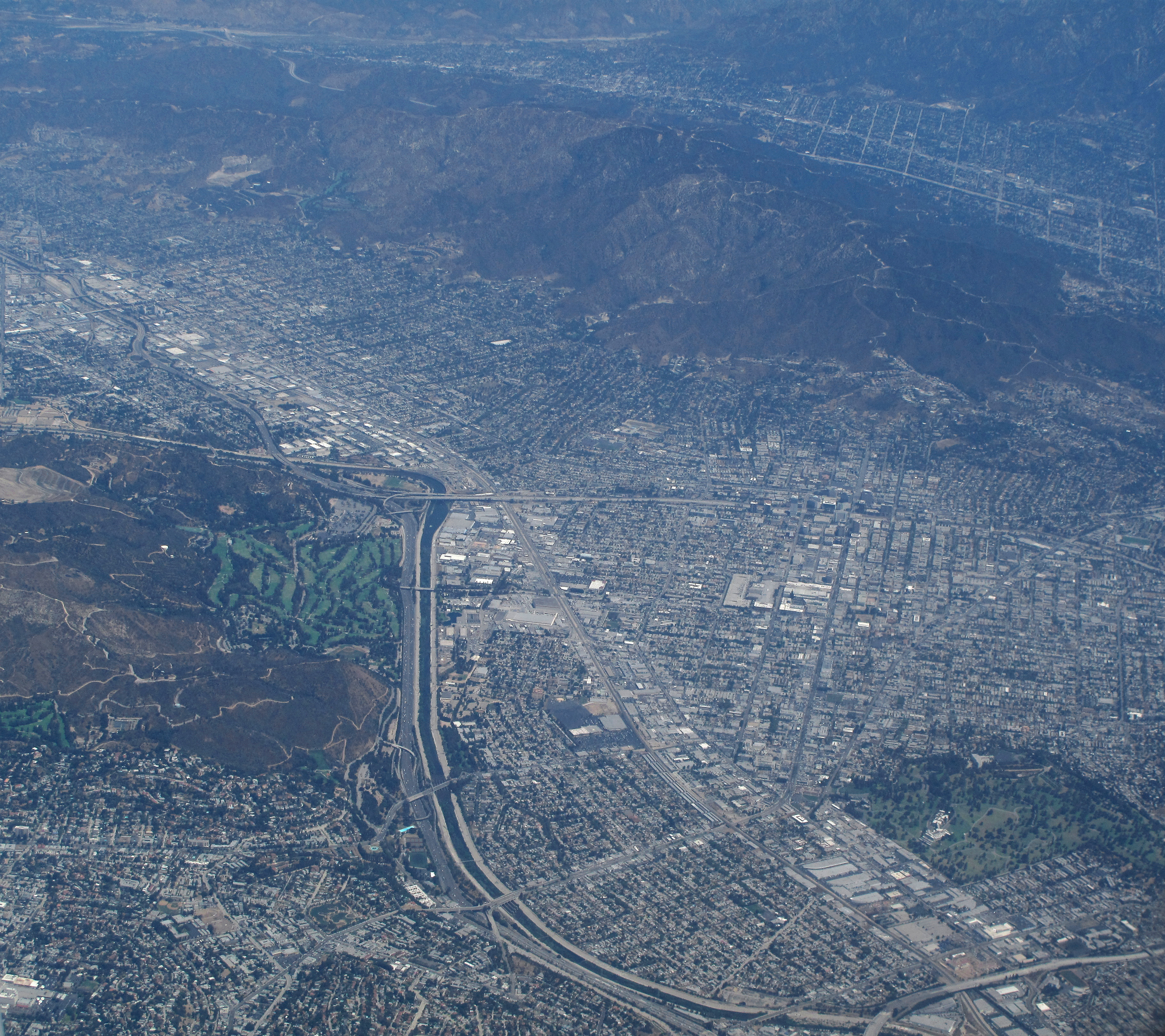
Wilson Golf Course (1923, center) and Harding Golf Course (1923, far left), Griffith Park, Los Angeles, California

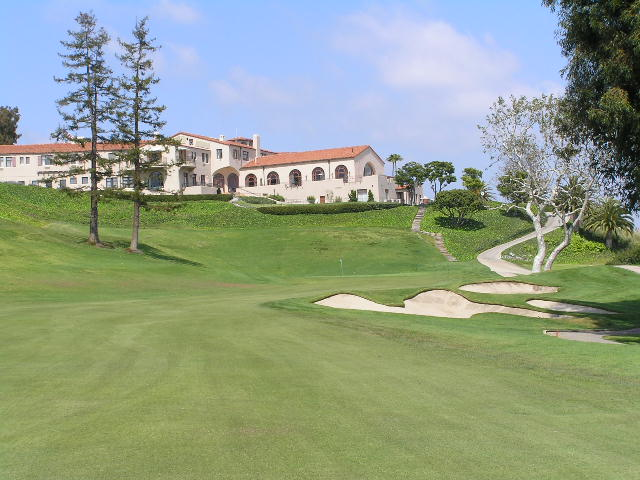
Riviera Country Club (1927, with William P. Bell), Pacific Palisades, California. Because of the half-bowl shape of the topography, the 18th hole is nicknamed "The Amphitheater".

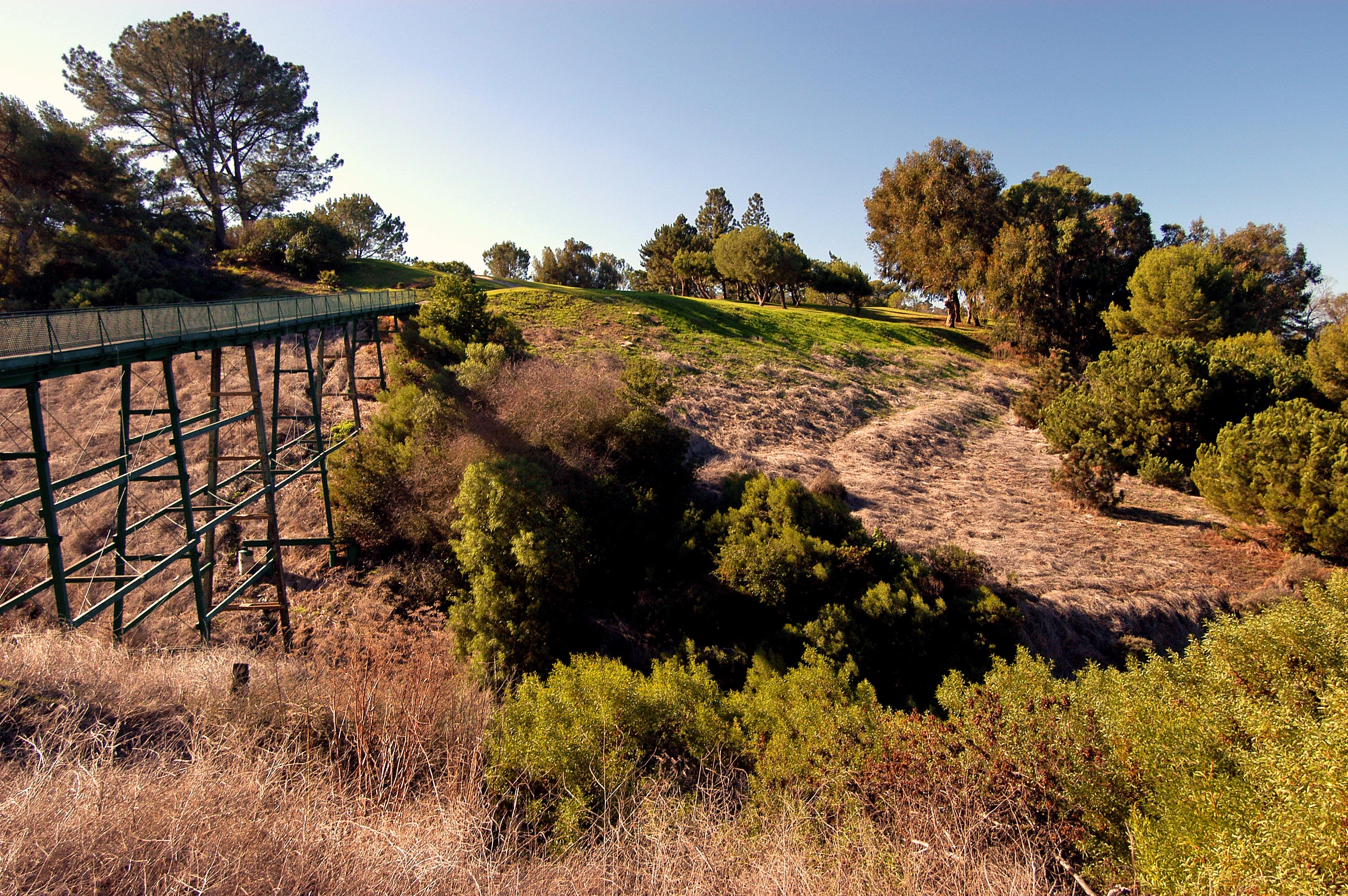
12th hole, Palos Verdes Golf Club, Palos Verdes Estates, California

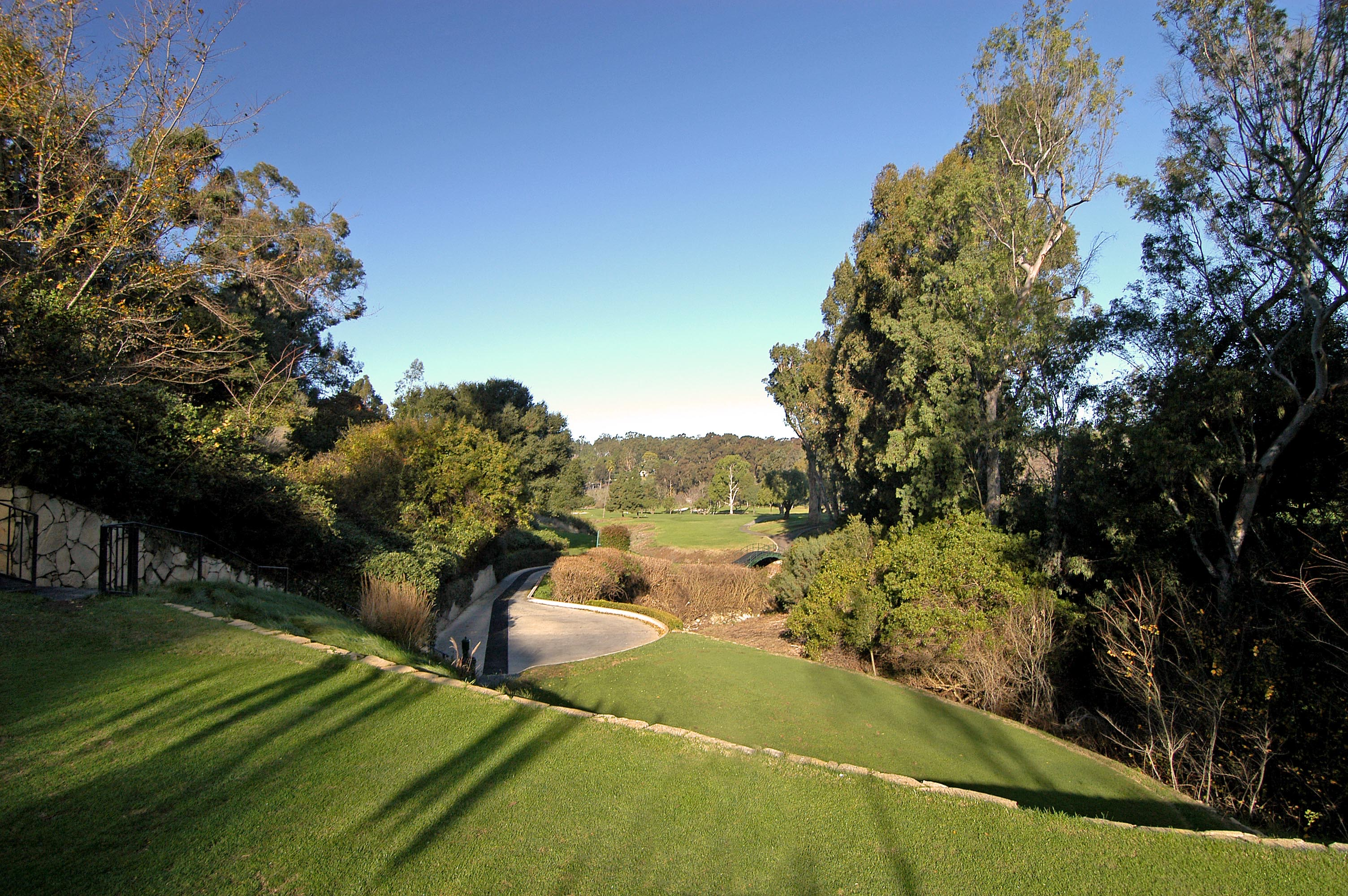
14th hole, Palos Verdes Golf Course - designed by George C. Thomas & William P. Bell (photo taken in 2003)
