= Pine Valley Golf Club =

Golf course in Camden County, New Jersey

- Location in the United States Location in New Jersey
- 39.789°N 74.972°W

Club information
- Location: Pine Hill, New Jersey, U.S.
- Elevation: 120 feet (37 m) AMSL
- Established: 1913; 113 years ago
- Type: Private
- Tota holes: 18
- Tournaments: Walker Cup (1936, 1985)
- Designed by: George Arthur Crump; Harry Colt; Charles Hugh Alison; A. W. Tillinghast; Perry Maxwell
- Par: 70
- Length: 7,201 yards (6,585 m)
- Course rating: 76.6
- Slope rating: 155
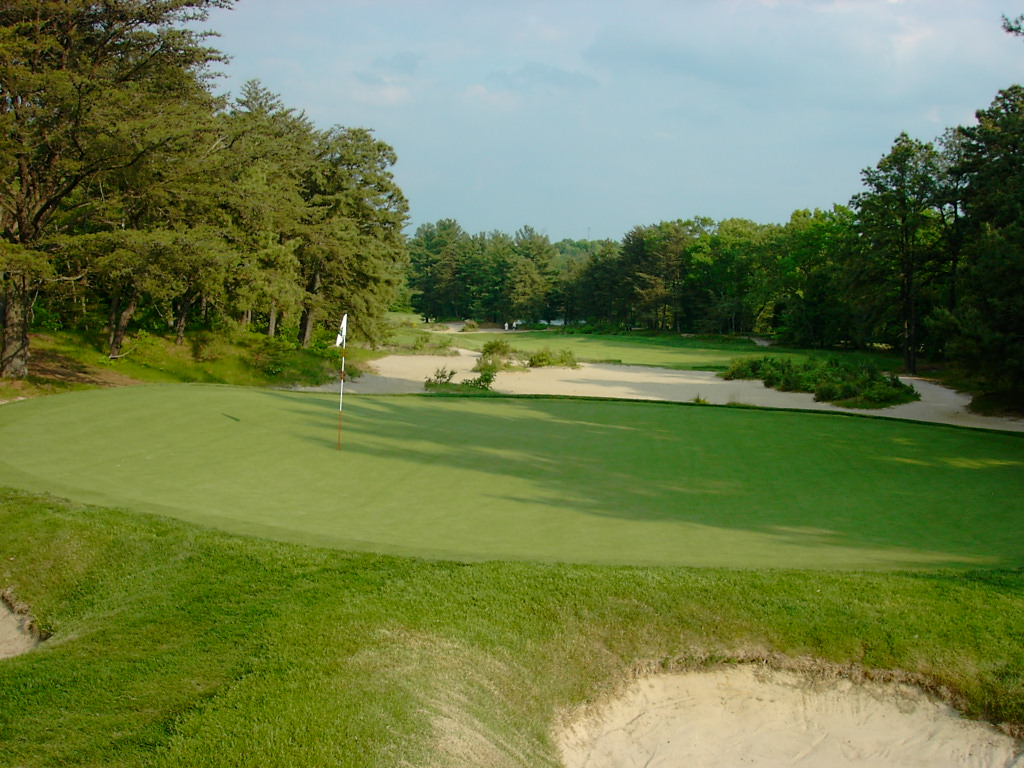
- The par-four 17th in 2009

Pine Valley Golf Club is a golf course in Pine Hill, Camden County, in southern New Jersey. It was ranked the number one course in Golf Magazine's 100 Top Courses in the U.S. and the World in 2012, 2015, 2019, 2020, and 2023. A private club, non-members can play only if invited and accompanied by a member. Southeast of downtown Philadelphia, Pine Valley is currently ranked number one in Golf Digest's America's 100 Greatest Golf Courses.

== History ==
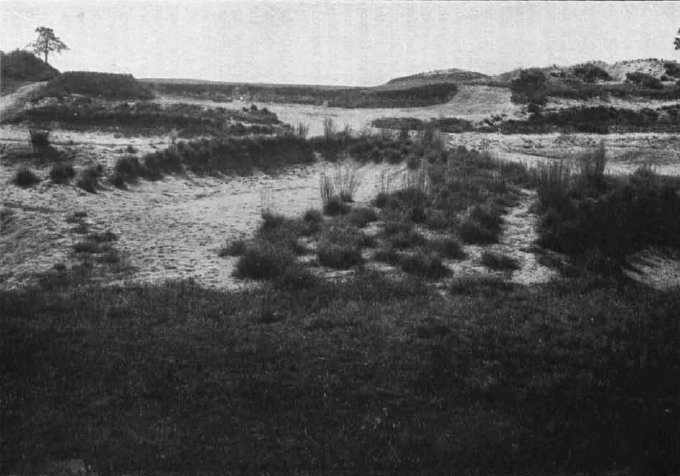
The second hole in 1921, featuring a carry over wasteland to the green.

Pine Valley was founded in 1913 by a group of amateur golfers from Philadelphia. They purchased 184 acres (0.7 km^{2}) of rolling, sandy ground deep in the pinelands of southern New Jersey, and gave George Arthur Crump, who knew the area from hunting expeditions, the opportunity to design the course.

The site was challenging and the project became something of an obsession for Crump, who sold his hotel in Philadelphia and plowed his money into the course. Marshlands had to be drained and 22,000 tree stumps had to be pulled with special steam-winches and horse-drawn cables. This was all done at a time when many golf courses were still built with minimal earth moving, and the course was called "Crump's Folly" by some.

This was Crump's first and only golf course design, but he brought together celebrated architects such as A.W. Tillinghast, Hugh Wilson, George C. Thomas Jr., Walter Travis, and H.S. Colt to help him create the course. Crump set himself some idiosyncratic principles: no hole should be laid out parallel to the next; no more than two consecutive holes should play in the same direction; and players should not be able to see any hole other than the one they were playing. He also felt that a round of golf on his course should require a player to use every club in the bag.

The first eleven holes opened unofficially in 1914. In 1918, when Crump died (reportedly penniless), four holes – #12, #13, #14, and #15 – were incomplete; they were finished in 1922.

Pine Valley later spread to 623 acres (2.5 km^{2}), of which 416 acres (1.7 km^{2}) remain virgin woodland. Since Crump's death, alterations have been made by several other leading golf course designers. The club also has a ten-hole short course designed by Tom Fazio and Ernest Ransome III.

In April 2021, the New Jersey Office of Attorney General's Division on Civil Rights filed a complaint claiming the club violated the law by banning women from becoming members, restricting access to women, and preventing women from owning homes on club land. A settlement was reached in May 2023, in which the club agreed to end discriminatory employment and housing practices, and educate their employees about the state's civil rights law. The club had already begun allowing women members during the investigation. In addition to these changes, the club also agreed to pay $100,000 to the Division on Civil Rights, and spend another $100,000 to create scholarships supporting the participation of women in golf.

== The Course ==
Tee	Slope	Rating	Par	Length
Championship	155	76.6	70	7,201 yd (6,585 m)
Regular	153	73.6	70	6,557 yd (5,996 m)

Pine Valley Slope, Rating, and Yardage as of 2023

In "The Complete Golfer", course architect Robert Trent Jones wrote that Pine Valley "is frequently alluded to as the most difficult course in the world, and this reputation is justified. To my way of thinking, it also possesses more classic holes than any other course in the world." Johnny Miller wrote that "There are no weak holes. Every single one is a masterpiece. There is a surprise around every corner, 18 unique and beautiful challenges."

== Membership ==
Pine Valley Golf Club is a highly exclusive club; membership is by invitation only from the board of directors. The only way guests are allowed into the club is if they are invited and accompanied by a member, and they must have low handicaps to play the course.

The club voted on April 30, 2021 to remove all gender-restricted language from their bylaws after learning of the investigation by the New Jersey Division on Civil Rights.

Prior to this, women were only permitted to play the course on Sunday afternoons.

Pine Valley is one of five golf clubs that participates in an annual rotating-venue members-only golf tournament known as SCAPS; the other clubs are Seminole Golf Club, Cypress Point Club, Augusta National Golf Club, and San Francisco Golf Club.

There are about 930 members spread throughout the world, and the list is a closely guarded secret. Notable members of the club have included George H. W. Bush, Sean Connery, Ben Crenshaw, Tom Fazio, Robert Trent Jones Jr., Connie Mack, Bob McNair, Mark Mulvoy, Arnold Palmer, Gary Player, Dan Quayle, Brian L. Roberts, Jay Sigel, George C. Thomas Jr., and A. W. Tillinghast.

== Tournaments at Pine Valley ==
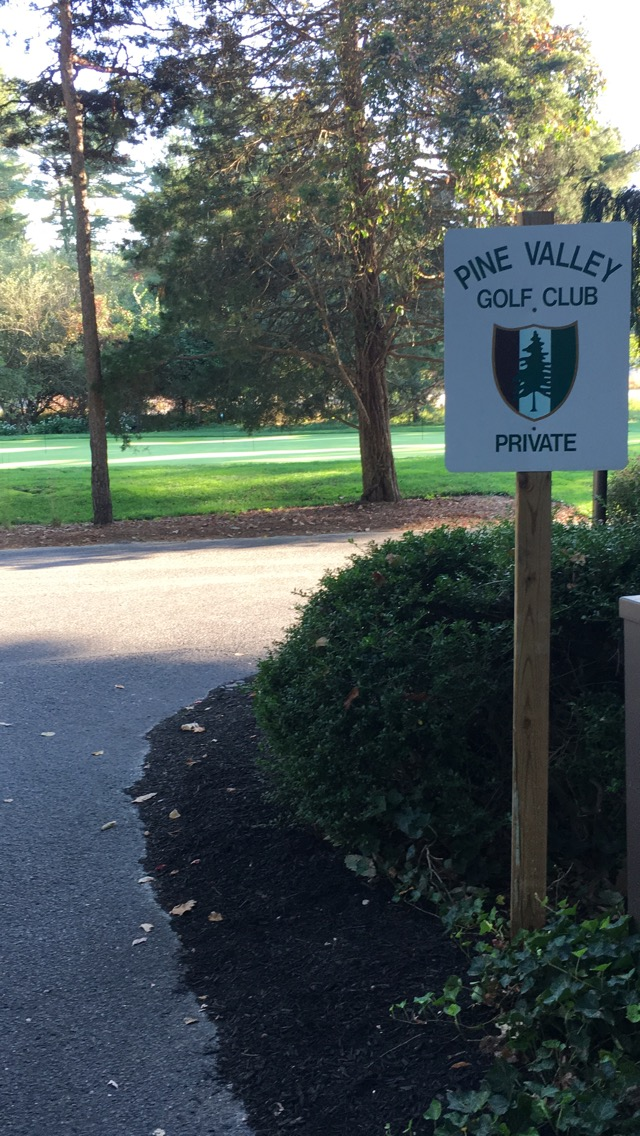
Entrance to Pine Valley

Pine Valley hosted the Walker Cup, an amateur competition between teams from the United States and Great Britain & Ireland, in 1936 and 1985.

In 1962, Pine Valley was the venue for an edition of Shell's Wonderful World of Golf, a match between Gene Littler and Byron Nelson.

The club admits spectators for one day in late September every year to watch the Crump Cup, a nationally recognized tournament featuring elite mid-amateur players.

The club will host the 2034 Curtis Cup.

=== Crump Cup ===
The Crump Cup is an invitational golf tournament for amateurs. The first tournament was held in 1922. It is named for George Arthur Crump, and is played on the grounds of Pine Valley Golf Club, which Crump founded. The format for the four days is two rounds of stroke play, qualifying, followed by two rounds of match play. The final round has traditionally held on the last Sunday in September. Jay Sigel has won the event the most times, with nine victories between 1975 and 1993.

Since at least the 1970s, the public can, on the day of the final round, tour the golf course and view tournament play. This is the only day each year on which the public has access to the grounds of the club. Visitors park at the nearby Clementon Amusement Park, where a local youth athletic association charges $25 per car. Yellow school buses then take fans on a five-minute ride down a secluded side road, away from amusement park, and unload in a gravel parking lot in the woods. Visitors are not allowed to bring in cameras, video recorders, or cell phones. Admission is for the afternoon only.

== Awards and rankings ==
Pine Valley Awards and Rankings

Year	Source	Award
1985–2000	Golf Digest	#1 - America's 100 Greatest Golf Courses
2003–2008	Golf Digest	#1 - America's 100 Greatest Golf Courses
2003-2022	Golf Magazine	Best Golf Course in the United States
2005-2022	USA Today Golfweek Magazine	Best (pre-1960) Golf Course in the United States
2005-2021	Golf Magazine	Best Golf Course in the World
2013–2014	Golf Digest	#1 - America's 100 Greatest Golf Courses
2015–2016	Golf Digest	#2 - America's 100 Greatest Golf Courses
2017–2025	Golf Digest	#1 - America's 100 Greatest Golf Courses
