= John Sargent Pillsbury Sr. =

American businessman (1878–1968)

John Sargent Pillsbury Sr. (December 6, 1878, Minneapolis, Minnesota – January 31, 1968, Palm Beach County, Florida) was an American businessman and industrialist known for his role as CEO at Pillsbury Company. His father was Charles Alfred Pillsbury co-founder of Pillsbury Company with his uncle John S. Pillsbury after which John himself was named. John's father had served in the Minnesota State Senate and his great uncle had served as governor of Minnesota from January 7, 1876, to January 10, 1882. It was for this reason that John had wanted to pursue a career in politics upon graduating from the University of Minnesota. He had also planned to go to France at the turn of the century to study international law and the French language.

Unfortunately, the family business was in turmoil following the deaths of his father, while he was in college, and his great uncle soon after graduation. John, his twin brother Charles and their cousin Alfred Fiske Pillsbury, son of Gov. Pillsbury, formed a management team to take over the company. In 1889, the company had been purchased by British investors and while his father and great uncle both remained in key positions within the company, it was no longer family owned.

John then fought off not only a buyout effort from a New York group to join it with their flour milling trust and then saved it from receivership in 1909. They put together a group that bought Pillsbury-Washburn Flour Co. Ltd., back from British stockholders in 1923 and took great pride in bringing it back under U.S. ownership. During a trip to Sicily, Italy and France, John learned a method for milling semolina flour which is made from durum wheat and used as a principal ingredient for making macaroni.

John served for 58 years on the board of directors of the Pillsbury Co. and remained an active member until 1962 He was chairman of the board from 1932 until his retirement in 1952 when he became director emeritus. Pillsbury also was a director of Northwestern National Bank, Northwestern Bancorporation, Meriden Iron Co., and was president of Sargent Land Co., and the Keewatin Mining Co.

Pillsbury was a lifelong Republican who built a magnificent summer home where he and his wife of 57 years raised their growing family. He married Eleanor Jerusha Lawler (b. August 31, 1887) on December 5, 1911, and they had six children of which Edmund and Charles died early in life. The survivors were his namesake John S. Pillsbury Jr., his son George and two daughters Mrs. Thomas M. Crosby, Orono, Minnesota, and Mrs. Stanley R. Resor, Washington, D.C. Known as Pillsbury Mansion and as Southways Estate on Lake Minnetonka (or Southways for short), the mansion became famous for the beauty New Jersey architect Harrie T. Lindeberg built into it. They spent their winters at their home in Palm Beach, Florida which is where John S. Pillsbury Sr., died on January 31, 1968, in Palm Beach County, Florida. His funeral was held at Plymouth Congregation Church and burial was at Lakewood Cemetery in Minneapolis.

There has been confusion between the identities of John's great uncle, himself and his namesake son because they all possessed exactly the same name of John Sargent Pillsbury and they were all top executives at the same family owned company.
