= Merion Golf Club =

Private golf club in Haverford Township, Pennsylvania, USA

- The 18th. green and clubhouse
- Formation: 1896; 130 years ago
- Type: Golf club
- Location: Haverford Township, Pennsylvania, U.S.
- Website: meriongolfclub.com

Merion Golf Club
- Interactive map of Merion Golf Club

Club information
- Location: Haverford Township, PA
- Elevation: 350 feet (110 m) AMSL
- Established: 1912 - East Course; 1914 - West Course
- Type: Private
- Total holes: 36
- Tournaments: List of USGA Tournaments: U.S. Women's Amateur (1904, 1909, 1926, 1949); U.S. Amateur (1916, 1924, 1930, 1966, 1989, 2005, 2026); U.S. Open (1934, 1950, 1971, 1981, 2013); Curtis Cup (1954) (2022); IGF World Amateur (1960); U.S. Girl's Junior (1998); Walker Cup (2009)
- Website: Merion Golf Club

East Course
- Designed by: Hugh Irvine Wilson (1912) Gil Hanse & Jim Wagner (2014 renovation)
- Par: 70
- Length: 6,946 yards (6,351 m)
- Course rating: 75.1
- Slope rating: 151

West Course
- Designed by: Hugh Irvine Wilson (1914) Gil Hanse & Jim Wagner (2025 renovation)
- Par: 70
- Length: 5,989 yards (5,476 m)
- Course rating: 69.9
- Slope rating: 122
- Merion Golf Club, East and West Courses
- U.S. National Register of Historic Places
- U.S. National Historic Landmark District
- Location within Pennsylvania Location within the United States
- Location: Ardmore, Pennsylvania
- Coordinates: 40.001°N 75.312°W
- Built: 1912
- Architect: Hugh Irvine Wilson
- Architectural style: Colonial Revival
- NRHP reference No.: 89002085

Significant dates
- Added to NRHP: December 21, 1989
- Designated NHLD: April 27, 1992

Merion Golf Club is a private golf club which is located in Haverford Township, Delaware County, Pennsylvania, a township bordering Philadelphia to the northwest along the historic Main Line. The club has two courses: the East Course, and the West Course. The East Course has been consistently rated in the top 10, #5 in 2015, by Golf Digest in the annual "America's 100 Greatest Golf Courses", and it has hosted five U.S. Opens, most recently in 2013. In 2026, Merion was named an "anchor site" for USGA championships.

== History ==
=== Original course ===
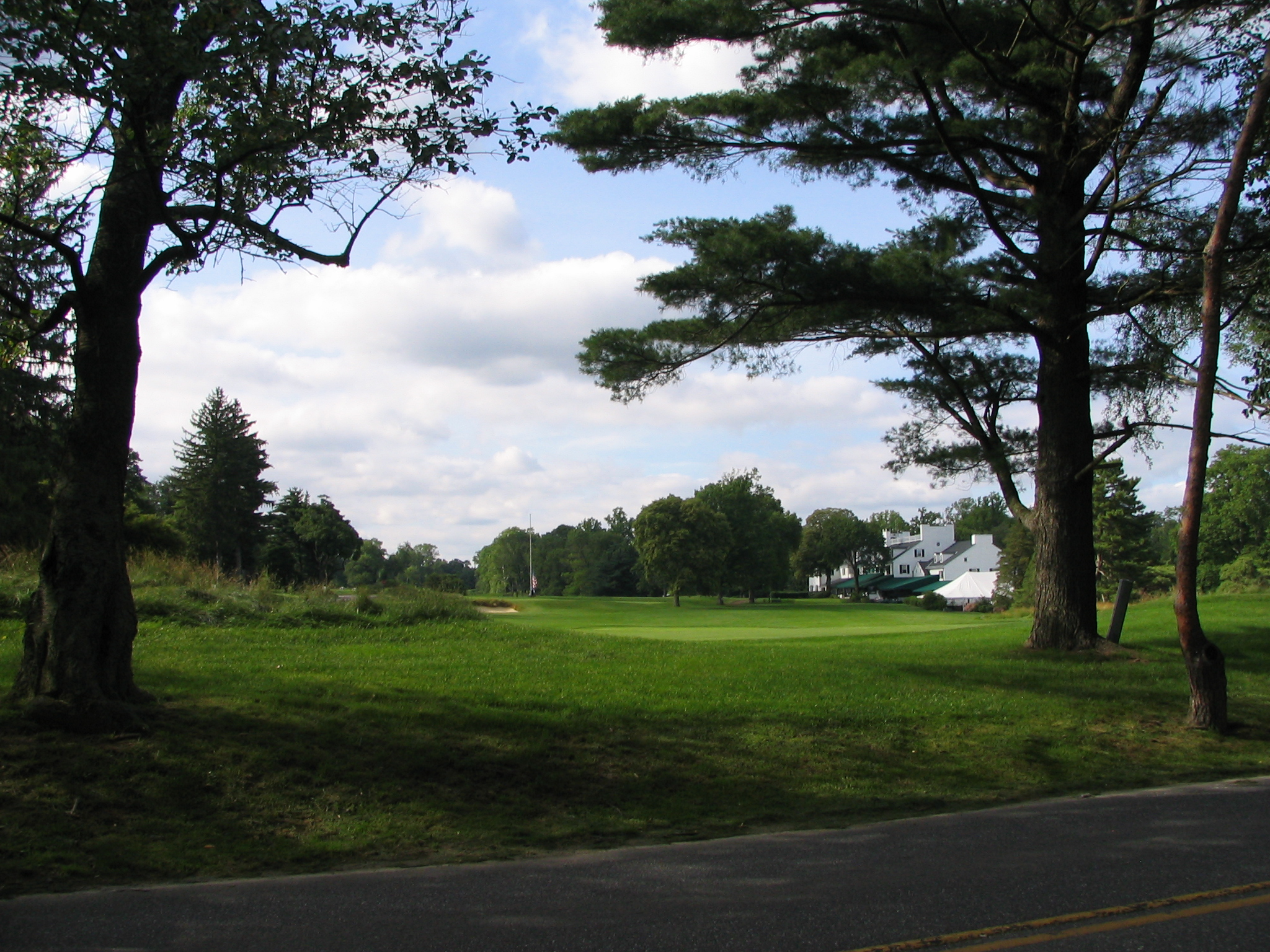
Looking down the first fairway towards the clubhouse from Ardmore Avenue

Claus Johnson, the eldest son of John Johnson and Christina Skute, was born sometime prior to 1712 and died about 1786. He married, March 30, 1734, Rebecca Bankson, the daughter of Andrew Bankson Jr., and his wife Gertrude Boore. Claus and Rebecca were living in Neshaminy, Bensalem, Bucks County, Pennsylvania in 1740 when he contributed ten shillings to Gloria Dei, and also at the time of the church census on November 20, 1743. In 1744, they bought a farm in Haverford Township, now in Delaware County, from Amos Lewis. The East course of the Merion Golf Club now occupies that property and their former home is the clubhouse. Claus was a vestryman at Old St. Davids Church in Radnor from 1760 to 1770 and it is presumed that he is buried there. The Merion Golf Club came to being in 1896, when members of the Merion Cricket Club (founded in 1865) opened a golf course in Haverford Township, Pennsylvania.

=== Two new courses ===
In 1910, the membership decided to build a new course and chose thirty-two-year-old club member Hugh Wilson, a Princeton University graduate, and fine player, to design it. Merion East opened in September 1912, and the original course was closed. The West Course, also designed by Wilson, opened in May 1914. The Merion Golf Club did not officially separate from the Merion Cricket Club until 1941.

=== Wilson's research pays off ===
Hugh Wilson had never designed a golf course, so he went on a seven-month trip to Scotland and England to study British courses. Several features of Merion East are derived from famous British courses, not the least of which are Merion's distinctive Scottish-style bunkers, which are now known as the "white faces of Merion" (named by top amateur player Chick Evans). Wilson's layout covers only 126 acres (0.51 km^{2}) of land, a very small area for a golf course. It was ranked fifth in Golf Digest's "America's 100 Greatest Golf Courses" in 2015, and Jack Nicklaus has said of Merion East, "Acre for acre, it may be the best test of golf in the world."

Wilson's designs were the first courses designed to provide both significant penalties (in terms of hazards and boundaries) for deviation from lines of play, and multiple possible means for reaching the pin from the tee. The West Course in particular is relatively little altered from Wilson's design, while the East Course has had alterations made to accommodate the widening of Ardmore Avenue. The club was designated a National Historic Landmark in 1992 for its contribution to these innovations in the sport.

Merion has held twenty United States Golf Association (USGA) championship tournaments, more than any other course. The first two, the 1904 and 1909 U.S. Women's Amateurs, were held at the original Haverford course. The first USGA men's tournament held at the East Course was the 1916 U.S. Amateur, won by Chick Evans. This was also the first time Bobby Jones appeared in a national championship; he was fourteen years old. Jones would win his first U.S. Amateur in 1924, also held at Merion.

=== Bobby Jones completes Grand Slam ===
In 1930, the U.S. Amateur returned to Merion in late September. Earlier that year, Bobby Jones had won the British Amateur, British Open, and U.S. Open, so anticipation was high to see if he could complete the sweep of all four major championships of the time, the "impregnable quadrilateral." Jones won the medal in the stroke play qualifier and cruised through the first four rounds of match play, to the final 36-hole match against Eugene Homans on Saturday. A gallery of 9,000 was on hand for the start of the match; this swelled to 18,000 by the afternoon round, forcing the competitors to be escorted to the tees and greens. After the morning round, Jones was comfortably ahead by seven holes, and when both players parred the 11th hole Jones had an 8 & 7 victory (eight holes ahead with seven to play). Searching for words to describe the unprecedented feat, Atlanta newsman O. B. Keeler used the term "Grand Slam", which has stuck ever since. Seven weeks after the tournament, Bobby Jones retired from competitive golf at age 28.

=== Hogan's comeback from accident ===
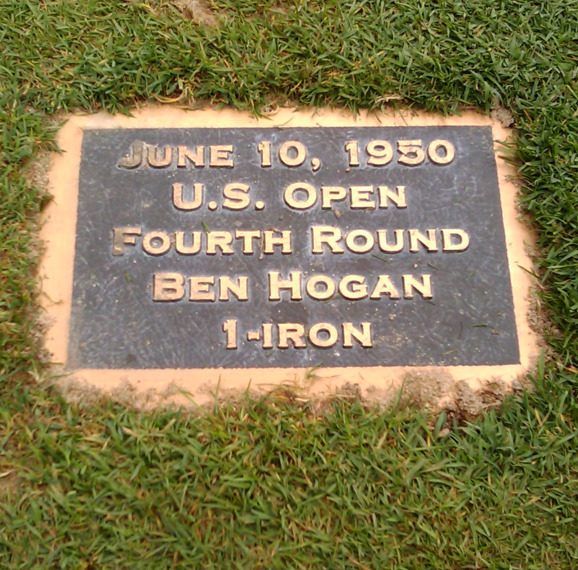
Plaque on the 18th fairway at Merion East Golf Course commemorating Ben Hogan's famous shot from the 1950 U.S. Open

Merion's 1950 U.S. Open was the site of Ben Hogan's comeback, sixteen months after a head-on collision with a bus which shattered his pelvis and nearly killed him. On the 72nd hole (and 36th of the day), in extreme pain and facing a shot of over 200 yards (180 m) into the wind, Hogan needed a par to force a playoff, as he had just bogeyed the long par-3 17th (and the par-4 15th). From the fairway, Hogan used a 1-iron to hit a superb shot which stopped on the distant green and two-putted from 40 feet (12 m) for par. Hogan then defeated Lloyd Mangrum and George Fazio in an 18-hole playoff on Sunday to win the tournament. Hy Peskin's photograph of Hogan's 1-iron shot, taken from behind during Hogan's follow-through, is among the most famous pictures in golf.

Lost for over three decades, the club resurfaced in the early 1980s, and now resides in the USGA Museum.

The point on the 18th fairway where Hogan hit the famous shot is commemorated with a plaque.

=== Trevino defeats Nicklaus ===
The U.S. Open in 1971 at Merion resulted in another playoff, this time between Jack Nicklaus and Lee Trevino, arguably the top two players in the world at the time. Both had missed putts on the 72nd hole to win on Sunday, Trevino for par and Nicklaus for birdie. In the Monday playoff, Nicklaus had trouble early in the bunkers and was behind the rest of the round. Trevino, the 1968 champion, won by three strokes for his second U.S. Open title. It was the second of four times that Nicklaus was a runner-up to Trevino at a major championship.

=== Strengthened course tests new generation ===
Following David Graham's win at the U.S. Open at Merion in 1981, it was felt by many that the relatively short course of about 6,500 yards (5,940 m), small course area of 111 acres (45 ha) (which limits gallery size), and lack of grounds to hold corporate tents and other infrastructure would preclude Merion from holding a major again. However, following some land acquisition nearby and lengthening of the East Course to nearly 7,000 yards (6,400 m), many of these concerns appeared to be addressed.

After successfully hosting the U.S. Amateur in 2005, the USGA awarded a fifth U.S. Open to Merion, held in 2013, 32 years after its last hosting of the national championship.

Justin Rose captured his first major by posting a score of one-over-par 281 for 72 holes, good for a two-stroke victory over Phil Mickelson and Jason Day. Most of the players who competed in the 2013 Open had very high praise for the course, which featured long, difficult rough following a wet spring. The lowest 18-hole score for the tournament was three-under-par 67, posted by several players, including Mickelson. The course held up very well as a premium test of golf, in spite of pre-tournament worries from some golf media people that many low scores would be posted by the modern generation of players.

=== Wicker baskets ===
On the East Course, all pins are topped with wicker baskets instead of the usual flags (which are used on the West Course).

As one story goes, when Hugh Wilson was in England studying their golf courses, he happened upon local sheep herders and their flocks. These shepherds held staffs that they used for herding, and the staffs all had wicker baskets at the top. In those baskets, they kept their lunch for the day so that no animals could get into it. Wilson decided to use the idea at Merion, though the exact origin has never been fully verified. One effect is that the baskets are visible even if the wind is not blowing – but they do not give the golfer any indication of wind direction at the green. They have been used since at least 1916, and are featured in the club's logo.

The pin markers at Merion East have several other unique features. At 7 feet 6 inches (2.29 m), including the 14-inch-high (36 cm) baskets, they are 6 inches (15 cm) taller than standard flagsticks. The poles are solid metal instead of the standard fiberglass, and the baskets themselves are colored red on the first nine holes and orange on the second nine. Interestingly, the 1950 U.S. Open was the only USGA championship held at Merion East in which the pins were marked with flags instead of wicker baskets. In 2013, club historian John Capers indicated that he did not know the reason for the substitution, but speculated that it came about because a player in the previous year's U.S. Women's Amateur, held on the same course, was unnerved when her ball bounced off a basket during match play.

Up until around 1980, the wicker baskets were made on site by a member of the grounds crew staff. Since then, a woman, whose name and location in South Carolina are purposely kept anonymous, creates the current baskets. Anyone who wins a USGA event at Merion receives a wicker basket top. Wickers are destroyed if the wicker baskets are broken. The golf course assistant superintendents collect the wickers every night, so they will not be stolen.

== Tournaments at Merion ==
=== Major championships ===
Year	Tournament	Winner	Winner's share ($)
1934	U.S. Open	(United States) Olin Dutra	1,000
1950	U.S. Open	(United States) Ben Hogan ^	4,000
1971	U.S. Open	(United States) Lee Trevino ^	30,000
1981	U.S. Open	(Australia) David Graham	55,000
2013	U.S. Open (5)	(England) Justin Rose	1,440,000
2030	U.S. Open		
2034	U.S. Women's Open		
2040	U.S. Open		
2046	U.S. Women's Open		
2050	U.S. Open		

^ 18 hole playoffs: 1950, 1971

=== Amateur championships ===
Year	Tournament	Winner
1904	U.S. Women's Amateur	(United States) Georgianna Bishop
1909	U.S. Women's Amateur	(Scotland) Dorothy Campbell
1916	U.S. Amateur	(United States) Chick Evans
1924	U.S. Amateur	(United States) Bobby Jones
1926	U.S. Women's Amateur	(United States) Helen Stetson
1930	U.S. Amateur	(United States) Bobby Jones
1949	U.S. Women's Amateur (4)	(United States) Dorothy Porter
1966	U.S. Amateur	(Canada) Gary Cowan
1989	U.S. Amateur	(United States) Chris Patton
1998	U.S. Girls' Junior	(United States) Leigh Anne Hardin
2005	U.S. Amateur (6)	(Italy) Edoardo Molinari
2026	U.S. Amateur (7)	

- East Course opened in 1912, first used in 1916 U.S. Amateur

=== International team competitions ===
Year	Tournament	Winner
1954	Curtis Cup	United States
1960	Eisenhower Trophy	United States
2009	Walker Cup	United States
2022	Curtis Cup (2)	United States

== Scorecards ==
East
Tee	Rating/Slope	1	2	3	4	5	6	7	8	9	Out	10	11	12	13	14	15	16	17	18	In	Total
2013 U.S. Open		350	556	256	628	504	487	360	359	236	3736	303	367	403	115	464	411	430	246	521	3260	6996
Par	U.S. Open	4	5	3	5	4	4	4	4	3	36	4	4	4	3	4	4	4	3	4	34	70
Championship	75.1 / 151	358	589	250	622	501	484	368	358	231	3761	306	358	395	128	411	415	429	241	502	3185	6946
Back	73.6 / 149	358	554	219	595	412	430	368	358	231	3525	306	358	362	128	411	377	429	241	462	3074	6599
Middle	M:71.4 / 145 W:77.1 / 152	335	526	170	557	394	412	354	337	176	3261	288	345	340	117	380	361	398	208	405	2842	6103
Forward	M:69.5 / 138 W:74.8 / 147	314	467	156	538	381	393	336	322	145	3052	263	326	319	107	364	333	351	194	389	2646	5698
Forward-Green	M:67.1 / 132 W:71.6 / 140	314	467	140	421	349	393	267	322	145	2818	263	256	272	107	305	303	306	194	291	2297	5115
Par	Men's	4	5	3	5	4	4	4	4	3	36	4	4	4	3	4	4	4	3	4	34	70
Par	Women's	4	5	3	5	5	5	4	4	3	38	4	4	4	3	4	4	4	4	5	36	74

West
Tee	Rating/Slope	1	2	3	4	5	6	7	8	9	Out	10	11	12	13	14	15	16	17	18	In	Total
Back	69.2 / 122	319	403	493	203	408	119	287	242	429	2903	367	405	355	350	424	227	467	141	350	3086	5989
Middle	M:68.1 / 121 W:73.4 / 131	309	382	473	186	399	114	275	231	412	2781	340	382	339	333	414	216	455	136	337	2952	5733
Front	M:66.7 / 118 W:72.2 / 128	297	365	453	186	388	110	253	216	408	2676	319	359	335	277	402	202	439	132	320	2785	5461
SI	Men's	11	7	5	15	1	17	9	13	3		10	2	14	12	4	16	6	18	8
Par	Men's	4	4	5	3	4	3	4	4	4	35	4	4	4	4	4	3	5	3	4	35	70
Par	Women's	4	4	5	3	5	3	4	4	5	37	4	5	4	4	5	3	5	3	4	37	74
SI	Women's	9	5	1	15	3	17	11	13	7		10	2	12	14	6	16	4	18	8

== Merion Golf Club in popular culture ==
Merion Golf Club plays a prominent part in the novel "Back Spin" by Harlan Coben. The novel features a U.S. Open championship taking place at Merion Golf Club, during which the son of Jack Coldren, the golfer leading the pack, is kidnapped.

It is also the inspiration for the name of the Marion Club in Mario Golf for the Game Boy Color.

== See also ==
- Merion Cricket Club
