= Stroke Index =

Golf competition handicap system

The stroke index is a numbering system used in handicap golf competitions. The rules of golf require that the committee in charge of a competition publish a Handicap Stroke Table indicating the order of holes at which handicap strokes are to be given. Normally the table is included on the scorecard and lists the stroke index of each hole, a number from 1 to 18. Handicap strokes are given at holes where the stroke index of the hole is less than or equal to the number of strokes given. The table can be used in both match play and stroke play competitions.

== Detail ==
In match play the stroke index is used to evenly spread the handicap allowances across the course. This is done by allocating the odd stroke index numbers to the more difficult half (9 holes, Out or In) of the course, which is usually the longer half, and the even stroke index numbers to the easier half of the course. Holes 1 and 18 are usually not included in the first 8 of the stroke index. The first and second stroke index holes should be placed close to the middle of each nine and the first six strokes should not be allocated to adjacent holes. The 7th to the 10th stroke index holes should be allocated so that a player receiving 10 strokes does not receive strokes on three consecutive holes.

In Stableford, par and bogey competitions using stroke play, where an even distribution of strokes is not so important, if the club uses a different stroke index for these competitions then generally the most difficult hole to play is given the index of 1 and the easiest is indexed as 18 (there being 18 holes on a standard golf course). Technicality and hole length are factors contributing to difficulty.

Some clubs allocate different indexes for match play and Stableford/par/bogey matches.

Handicap strokes are deducted from a player's score in the order of stroke index from indexed hole 1 to 18 recurring. For example, a player with a handicap of 12 would be given a stroke deduction only on the holes with stroke index 1 to 12. A player with a handicap of 24 would receive a stroke at all 18 holes plus an extra stroke at holes 1 to 6 (18 + 6 = 24) so they would receive two strokes on holes 1 to 6 and one stroke for holes 7 to 18. In a handicap match play competition where the one player has a handicap 8 shots higher than their opponent then that player will receive a handicap stroke on the holes with stroke index 1 to 8. The stroke index is usually printed on a golf club's scorecard listed alongside each hole.
