= List of golf courses designed by Coore & Crenshaw =

This is a partial list of golf courses designed by Ben Crenshaw and Bill Coore, individually and as partners in the design firm Coore & Crenshaw. The duo has been designing golf courses as partners since 1986. The list is sorted by country, and then course.

Contribution code

- OD denotes original design.
- R denotes courses reconstructed.
- A denotes courses for which substantial additions were made.
- E denotes courses which were consulted on.

Name	Contribution	Year built	City / town	State / province	Country	Contributor	Comments
Streamsong Red	OD	2012	Fort Meade	Florida	United States	Coore & Crenshaw	
Streamsong The Chain	OD	2023	Fort Meade	Florida	United States	Coore & Crenshaw	
Brambles Golf Club	OD	2023	Middletown	California	United States	Coore & Crenshaw	
Torch Cay	OD	2023	Torch Cay	Exuma	The Bahamas	Coore & Crenshaw	
The International	R	2023	Boston	Massachusetts	United States	Coore & Crenshaw	Renovation of the "Pines Course" on the property.
Omni Barton Creek Resort & Spa			Austin	Texas	United States	Coore & Crenshaw	Designed the Coore Crenshaw Cliffside course.
Austin Golf Club	OD		Austin	Texas	United States	Ben Crenshaw	
Sheep Ranch	OD		Bandon	Oregon	United States	Coore & Crenshaw	
Bandon Trails	OD	2005	Bandon	Oregon	United States	Coore & Crenshaw	
Cabot Cliffs	OD		Nova Scotia	Nova Scotia	Canada	Coore & Crenshaw	
Chechessee Creek	OD	2000	Okatie	South Carolina	United States	Coore & Crenshaw	
The Dormie Club	OD		Pinehurst	North Carolina	United States	Coore & Crenshaw	
Friar's Head	OD	2011	Baiting Hollow	New York	United States	Coore & Crenshaw	
Hidden Creek Golf Club	OD	2002	Egg Harbor Township	New Jersey	United States	Coore & Crenshaw	
Klub Rima Irian	OD	1996	Kuala Kencana	Indonesia	Indonesia	Coore & Crenshaw	
Old Sandwich Golf Club	OD	2004	Plymouth	Massachusetts	United States	Coore & Crenshaw	
Sand Hills Golf Club	OD	1995	Mullen	Nebraska	United States	Coore & Crenshaw	
Shanqin Bay Golf Club	OD	2012			China	Coore & Crenshaw	
Streamsong Red	OD		Bowling Green	Florida	United States	Coore & Crenshaw	
Trinity Forest Golf Club	OD	2016	Dallas	Texas	United States	Coore & Crenshaw	
Warren Golf Course	OD	2000	Notre Dame	Indiana	United States	Coore & Crenshaw	
Bougle Run	OD	2021	Bridport	Tasmania	Australia	Coore & Crenshaw	
Bandon Preserve	OD	2012	Bandon	Oregon	United States	Coore & Crenshaw	
Clear Creek Tahoe	OD	2009	Lake Tahoe	Nevada	United States	Coore & Crenshaw	
Colorado Golf Club	OD	2006	Parker	Colorado	United States	Coore & Crenshaw	
East Hampton Golf Club	OD	2000	East Hampton	New York	United States	Coore & Crenshaw	
The Golf Club at Cuscowilla	OD	1996	Eatonton	Georgia	United States	Coore & Crenshaw	
Kapalua Plantation Course	OD	1991	Maui	Hawaii	United States	Coore & Crenshaw	
Lost Farm at Barnbougle Dunes	OD	2011	Bridport	Tasmania	Australia	Coore & Crenshaw	
Ozarks National	OD	2019	Branson	Missouri	United States	Coore & Crenshaw	
Sand Valley Golf Resort	OD	2017	Nekoosa	Wisconsin	United States	Coore & Crenshaw	
The Sandbox	OD	2019	Nekoosa	Wisconsin	United States	Coore & Crenshaw	Par 3 course.
Sugarloaf Mountain	OD	2006	Lake Apopka	Florida	United States	Coore & Crenshaw	
Te Arai Links	OD	2022			New Zealand	Coore & Crenshaw	
Talking Stick Golf Club	OD	1997	Scottsdale	Arizona	United States	Coore & Crenshaw	Both North and South courses.
We-Ko-Pa Golf Club	OD	2005	Fort McDowell	Arizona	United States	Coore & Crenshaw	
Onion Creek Club	R	1996	Austin	Texas	United States	Coore & Crenshaw	Renovation of original 18 holes plus addition of nine holes.
Southern Hills Country Club	A	1992	Tulsa	Oklahoma	United States	Coore & Crenshaw	Nine hole addition
Brook Hollow Golf Club	R	1993	Dallas	Texas	United States	Coore & Crenshaw	
Pinehurst No. 11	OD	2027	Pinehurst	North Carolina	United States	Coore & Crenshaw	
Rodeo Dunes (Course #1)	OD	2026	Roggen	Colorado	United States	Coore & Crenshaw	
Anson Point	OD	2026	Bluffton	South Carolina	United States	Coore & Crenshaw	
