= List of golf course architects =

This is a list of golf course architects and golf course design firms. Golf course architecture is a specific discipline of landscape design, with many architects represented in the United States by the American Society of Golf Course Architects. Some architects are highly successful professional golfers who went on to design golf courses.

== A ==
- Paul Albanese
- Charles Hugh Alison
- Peter Alliss
- Mary Armstrong
- Kevin Atkinson
- Edmund Ault
- Dave Axland

== B ==
- Seve Ballesteros
- Rick Baril
- Gene Bates
- Samuel Beckman
- Brad Bell
- William Francis Bell
- William P. Bell
- Tom Bendelow
- Kevin Benedict
- Bill Bergin
- Cary Bickler
- Bruce Borland
- Harry Bowers
- James Braid

== C ==
- Doug Carrick
- Tony Cashmore
- Billy Casper
- Bobby Clampett
- Clive Clark
- Thomas Clark
- Mike Clayton
- George Cobb
- Neil Coles
- Rob Collins
- Colt, Alison & Morrison Ltd
- Harry Colt
- Blake Conant
- Pete Cooper
- Bill Coore (partner with Ben Crenshaw)
- Geoffrey Cornish
- Brian E. Costello
- Henry Cotton
- Colton Craig
- Ben Crenshaw (partner with Bill Coore)
- George Arthur Crump
- Bob Cupp
- Brian Curley
- Keith Cutten

== D ==
- David Dale
- Jack Daray Sr.
- Ben Davey
- Johnny Dawson
- Glen Day
- Bruce Devlin
- Mike DeVries
- Bill Diddel
- W. H. Diddle
- Ida Dixon
- Tom Doak
- Frank Duane
- George Duncan
- Tom Dunn
- Cynthia Dye
- Alice Dye
- Pete Dye

== E ==
- Martin Ebert
- Todd Eckenrode
- Chandler Egan
- Prosper Ellis
- Ernie Els
- Devereux Emmet
- Abe Espinosa
- Ramón Espinosa
- European Golf Design

== F ==
- Nick Faldo
- George Fazio
- Tom Fazio
- Willie Fernie
- Forrest Fezler
- Homer Fieldhouse
- Peter Fjällman
- William Flynn
- Ross Forbes
- Keith Foster
- John Fought
- Walter Fovargue
- William Herbert Fowler
- Kyle Franz
- Dana Fry
- Ron Fream

== G ==
- Ron Garl (Ronald M. Garl)
- Major Ram Gurung
- Jonathan Gaunt
- Timothy Gerrish
- Lester George
- Simon Gidman
- Clark Glasson
- Bob Goalby
- Kye Goalby
- Robert Muir Graves
- Hubert Green
- Denis Griffiths
- Caspar Grauballe
- Andrew Green
- Bob Gwynne
- Rob Gavarkovs

== H ==
- Eddie Hackett
- Dan Halldorson
- Gil Hanse
- John Harbottle III
- Kevin Hargrave
- Peter Harradine
- Martin Hawtree
- Mark Hayes
- Randy Heckenkemper
- Arthur Hills
- David Hemstock
- Marion Hollins
- Joel Hornickel
- Robert Hunter
- Johnny Ross Henry
- Al Howard
- Frank Hummel

== I ==
- Hale Irwin
- International Design Group
- Eric Iverson

== J ==
- Tony Jacklin
- John Jacobs
- Don January
- Paul Jansen
- Bill Johnston
- Clyde Johnston
- Clyde Johnson
- Bobby Jones
- David Jones
- Rees Jones
- Robert Trent Jones
- Robert Trent Jones, Jr.

== K ==
- Yoshikazu Kato
- Taizo Kawada
- David McLay Kidd
- Tad King
- Ron Kirby
- Tom Kite
- Gary Koch
- Harley Kruse
- Donald Knott

== L ==
- William Langford
- Thad Layton
- Joe Lee
- Jim Lipe
- Tim Lobb
- Emil Loeffler
- Davis Love III
- Christian Lundin
- Chris Lutzke
- Jeff Lynch

== M ==
- A.V. Macan
- Charles B. Macdonald
- Alister MacKenzie
- Tom Mackenzie
- Richard Mandell
- Mark Mahannah
- Ellis Maples
- Graham Marsh
- Greg Martin
- Billy Martindale
- W. Bruce Matthews III
- Perry Maxwell
- Shelley Mayfield
- Tom McBroom
- Mark McCumber
- Peter McEvoy
- Harold "Jug" McSpaden
- Frank Meehan
- Steve Melnyk
- Johnny Miller
- Jeff Mingay
- Mike Morley
- Old Tom Morris
- Jay Morrish
- John Stanton Fleming Morrison
- Mark Mungeam
- Robert McNeil
- Ken Moodie

== N ==
- Pirapon Namatra
- Vijit Nandrajog
- Jack Nicklaus
- Kevin Norby
- Greg Norman
- Bernard Nicholls
- Dick Nugent
- Nai Chung Chang
- Michel Niedbala

== O ==
- Pete Oakley
- Paul O'Brien
- Christy O'Connor Jnr
- Willie Ogg
- David Ogilvie
- Jaime Ortiz-Patino

== P ==
- Larry Packard
- Arnold Palmer
- Gary Panks
- Damian Pascuzzo
- Willie Park, Jr.
- Jerry Pate
- Ross Perrett
- Richard Phelps
- Kyle Phillips
- Agustin Piza
- Don Placek
- Gary Player
- Ralph Plummer
- Frank Pont
- Bill Powell
- Jimmy Powell
- Ron Prichard
- Dan Proctor
- Sid Puddicombe
- Hal Purdy

== Q ==
- Todd Quitno

== R ==
- Henry Ransom
- Tyler Rae
- Joginder Rao
- John Raese
- Seth Raynor
- Dean Refram
- Wilfrid Reid
- Achim Reinmuth
- Forrest L. Richardson
- Stephen Ridgway
- Steve Ritson
- Robert Lawrence
- Allan Robertson
- Ted Robinson
- John F Robinson
- J. Drew Rogers
- Rocky Roquemore
- Brian Ross
- Donald Ross
- Mackenzie Ross

== S ==
- John Sanford
- Ben Sayers
- David Pandel Savic
- Lee Schmidt
- Brian Schneider
- Kipp Schulties
- Ed Seay
- Donald Sechrest
- Barry Serafin
- Geoff Shackelford
- Scot Sherman
- Bob Shearer
- Brian Silva
- Tom Simpson
- Brian Slawnik
- Steve Smyers
- Annika Sörenstam
- Philip Spogárd
- Dr. Arthur Spring
- Christoph Städler
- Bert Stamps
- Donald Steel
- Jeffrey Stein
- Jason Straka
- Mike Strantz
- Herbert Strong
- Bruce Summerhays
- Howard Swan

== T ==
- John Henry Taylor
- Dave Thomas
- George C. Thomas, Jr.
- Stanley Thompson
- Peter Thomson
- Lassi Pekka Tilander
- A. W. Tillinghast
- Herbert Charles Tippet
- Walter Travis
- Alfred H. Tull
- Herbert J. Tweedie

== U ==
- Osamu Ueda

== V ==
- Aashish Vaishnava
- Harry Vardon
- Tom Vardon
- George Von Elm
- Douw van der Merwe

== W ==
- Jim Wagner, Nicklaus Design
- Jim Wagner, Hanse Golf Course Design
- William Watson
- Bobby Weed
- Tom Weiskopf
- Beau Welling
- Robert W. White
- Rod Whitman
- Chet Williams
- Chris Wilczynski
- Dick Wilson
- Hugh Irvine Wilson
- Derrell Witt
- Michael Wolveridge
- Norman H. Woods
- Tiger Woods

== Y ==
- John Francis Yuhas
