= Milwaukee Country Club =

Disbanded country club in River Hills, Wisconsin, USA

- Interactive map of Milwaukee Country Club
- 43°09′48″N 87°56′19″W

Club information
- Location: River Hills, Wisconsin; United States
- Established: 1911
- Type: Private
- Tota holes: 27
- Website: https://www.milwaukeecountryclub.org/
- Designed by: Charles Hugh Alison (1929)
- Designed by: Tom Doak (2020)

The Milwaukee Country Club is a golf club located in River Hills, Wisconsin. It is the home club of the late renowned teaching pro Manuel de la Torre The architect of the golf course's club house was Roger Bullard.

The golf course features a 6,875 yards of golf from the longest tees for a par of 72. The course rating is 73.8 while the slope rating is 135 on Bent grass. Charles Hugh Alison of Colt, Alison & Morrison Ltd designed the course when it opened in 1929.

== Notable events hosted ==
- 1903 Western Open
- 1969 Walker Cup
- 1988 U.S. Senior Amateur
- 2008 U.S. Mid-Amateur
