= Streamsong =

Golf and spa resort

Coordinates: 27.6926°N 81.9343°W

Streamsong Resort
- Interactive map of Streamsong Resort

Club information
- Location: Fort Meade, Florida
- Established: 2012; 14 years ago
- Owner: Kemper Sports Management (2023–present)
- Tota holes: 54

Streamsong Blue
- Designed by: Tom Doak
- Par: 72
- Length: 7,276 yards
- Course rating: 74.0
- Slope rating: 134

Streamsong Red
- Designed by: Bill Coore, Ben Crenshaw
- Par: 72
- Length: 7,110 yards
- Course rating: 74.1
- Slope rating: 137

Streamsong Black
- Designed by: Gil Hanse
- Par: 73
- Length: 7,320 yards
- Course rating: 74.7
- Slope rating: 135

Streamsong Resort is a golf and spa resort developed by The Mosaic Company in Bowling Green, Florida on a 16,000 acre property near Fort Meade, Florida. The resort includes a 228-room hotel and three golf courses built on the site of a former phosphate strip mine. Fishing on various lakes and clay-shooting are also offered.

On January 13, 2023, Mosaic sold Streamsong Resort to a subsidiary of Kemper Sports Management, LLC. for 160 million dollars.

== Courses ==
The courses are called "Red," "Blue," and "Black" - Red is designed by Coore & Crenshaw, Blue by Tom Doak, and Black by Gil Hanse. Golfweek magazine named Streamsong the best new golf course in 2012 and put the courses amongst the top 40 public courses in the world in 2013. The site ranks the Blue as 87th in the U.S. and 5th in Florida.

The 4th course named "The Chain" designed by Coore & Crenshaw opened in 2023.

== Scorecards ==
Streamsong Blue
| Tee | Rating/Slope | 1 | 2 | 3 | 4 | 5 | 6 | 7 | 8 | 9 | Out | 10 | 11 | 12 | 13 | 14 | 15 | 16 | 17 | 18 | In | Total |
| Green | 74.0 / 134 | 338 | 554 | 418 | 442 | 157 | 345 | 203 | 454 | 575 | 3486 | 187 | 487 | 408 | 312 | 545 | 446 | 237 | 690 | 478 | 3790 | 7276 |
| Black | 71.8 / 130 | 330 | 530 | 370 | 417 | 121 | 317 | 188 | 414 | 541 | 3228 | 161 | 454 | 390 | 293 | 510 | 398 | 215 | 590 | 453 | 3464 | 6692 |
| Silver | 69.5 / 127 | 330 | 516 | 359 | 369 | 115 | 295 | 176 | 338 | 510 | 3008 | 129 | 427 | 351 | 279 | 489 | 357 | 188 | 525 | 439 | 3184 | 6192 |
| Gold | 66.4 / 113 | 289 | 459 | 339 | 325 | 102 | 267 | 97 | 308 | 453 | 2639 | 103 | 386 | 317 | 247 | 452 | 341 | 165 | 498 | 364 | 2873 | 5512 |
| Par | | 4 | 5 | 4 | 4 | 3 | 4 | 3 | 4 | 5 | 36 | 3 | 4 | 4 | 4 | 5 | 4 | 3 | 5 | 4 | 36 | 72 |
| SI | Men's | 14 | 10 | 8 | 4 | 16 | 18 | 12 | 2 | 6 | | 15 | 1 | 11 | 17 | 9 | 7 | 13 | 5 | 3 |
| SI | Women's | 12 | 6 | 10 | 2 | 18 | 14 | 16 | 4 | 8 | | 17 | 5 | 9 | 15 | 3 | 7 | 13 | 1 | 11 |

Streamsong Red
| Tee | Rating/Slope | 1 | 2 | 3 | 4 | 5 | 6 | 7 | 8 | 9 | Out | 10 | 11 | 12 | 13 | 14 | 15 | 16 | 17 | 18 | In | Total |
| Green | 74.1 / 137 | 447 | 555 | 404 | 330 | 453 | 185 | 527 | 147 | 312 | 3360 | 486 | 423 | 500 | 535 | 181 | 474 | 208 | 403 | 540 | 3750 | 7110 |
| Black | 71.6 / 132 | 417 | 508 | 391 | 312 | 344 | 143 | 521 | 119 | 271 | 3026 | 431 | 408 | 472 | 508 | 166 | 453 | 184 | 384 | 505 | 3511 | 6537 |
| Silver | 69.5 / 124 | 410 | 461 | 340 | 290 | 328 | 128 | 502 | 111 | 257 | 2827 | 385 | 397 | 450 | 451 | 150 | 402 | 160 | 343 | 443 | 3181 | 6008 |
| Gold | 70.0 / 122 | 358 | 371 | 252 | 271 | 240 | 112 | 396 | 98 | 215 | 2313 | 278 | 275 | 340 | 427 | 111 | 291 | 103 | 317 | 406 | 2548 | 4861 |
| Par | | 4 | 5 | 4 | 4 | 4 | 3 | 5 | 3 | 4 | 36 | 4 | 4 | 4 | 5 | 3 | 4 | 3 | 4 | 5 | 36 | 72 |
| SI | Men's | 4 | 2 | 14 | 16 | 6 | 18 | 12 | 10 | 8 | | 9 | 5 | 3 | 15 | 11 | 1 | 7 | 13 | 17 |
| SI | Women's | 2 | 6 | 14 | 18 | 10 | 16 | 4 | 12 | 8 | | 7 | 5 | 3 | 17 | 11 | 1 | 9 | 13 | 15 |

Streamsong Black
| Tee | Rating/Slope | 1 | 2 | 3 | 4 | 5 | 6 | 7 | 8 | 9 | Out | 10 | 11 | 12 | 13 | 14 | 15 | 16 | 17 | 18 | In | Total |
| Green | 74.7 / 135 | 573 | 361 | 480 | 601 | 211 | 342 | 178 | 427 | 450 | 3623 | 548 | 463 | 571 | 430 | 298 | 133 | 463 | 205 | 586 | 3697 | 7320 |
| Black | 72.0 / 130 | 508 | 326 | 423 | 581 | 177 | 321 | 158 | 408 | 408 | 3310 | 524 | 395 | 531 | 409 | 286 | 131 | 442 | 189 | 530 | 3437 | 6747 |
| Silver | 69.5 / 125 | 466 | 309 | 394 | 550 | 158 | 299 | 135 | 377 | 360 | 3048 | 502 | 378 | 510 | 368 | 261 | 110 | 400 | 154 | 495 | 3178 | 6226 |
| Gold | 65.1 / 116 | 420 | 276 | 306 | 450 | 135 | 252 | 103 | 357 | 317 | 2616 | 434 | 320 | 404 | 308 | 242 | 78 | 323 | 124 | 431 | 2664 | 5280 |
| Par | | 5 | 4 | 4 | 5 | 3 | 4 | 3 | 4 | 4 | 36 | 5 | 4 | 5 | 4 | 4 | 3 | 4 | 3 | 5 | 37 | 73 |
| SI | Men's | 12 | 16 | 4 | 2 | 6 | 18 | 14 | 8 | 10 | | 11 | 3 | 7 | 9 | 15 | 17 | 1 | 13 | 5 |
| SI | Woen's | 10 | 12 | 4 | 2 | 6 | 18 | 16 | 8 | 14 | | 11 | 3 | 7 | 9 | 15 | 17 | 1 | 13 | 5 |

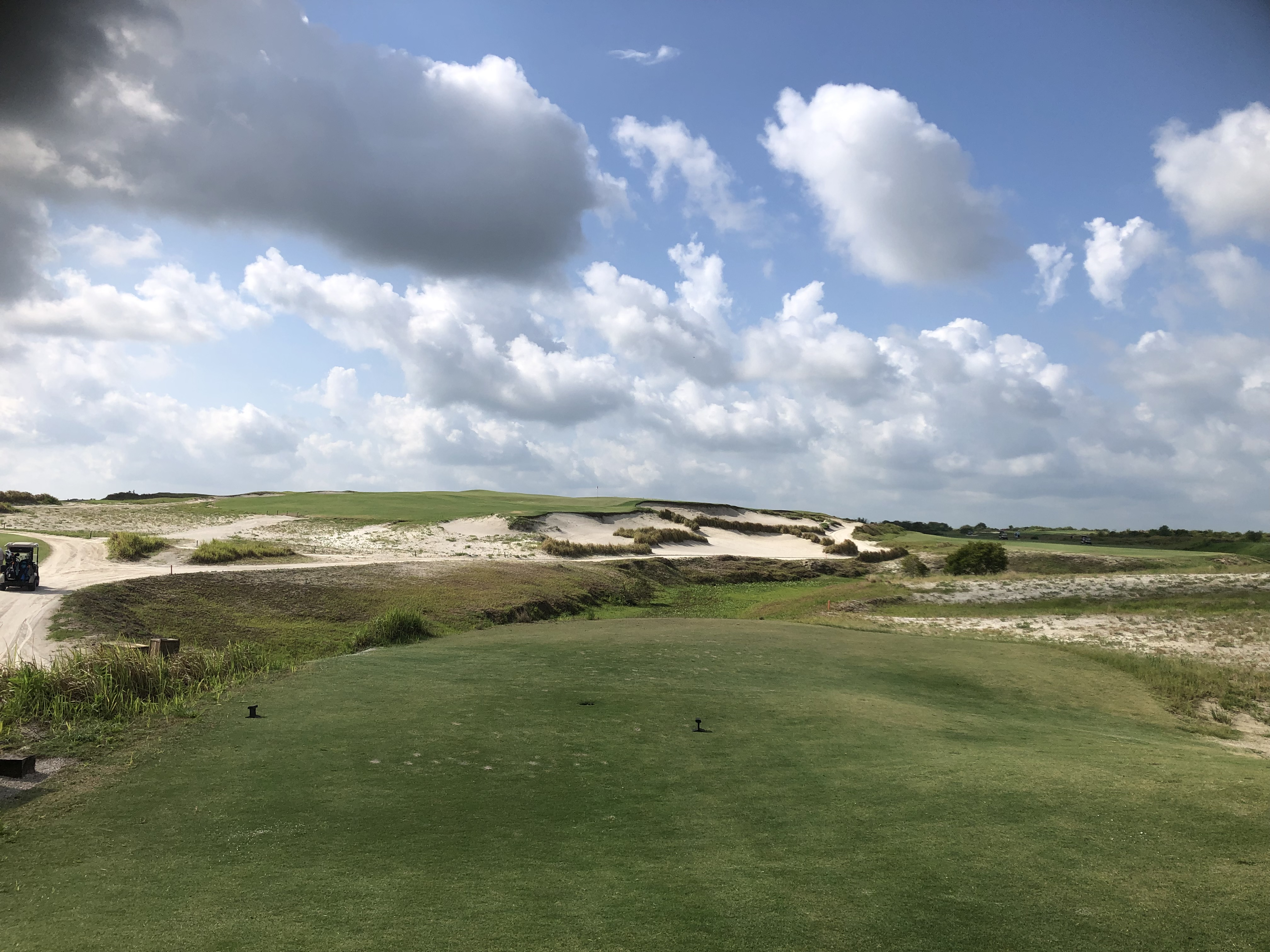
Uphill Par 3 5th hole on Streamsong Black
