= Bruce Matthews (disambiguation) =

Bruce Matthews (born 1961) is an American football player.

Bruce Matthews may also refer to:

- Bruce Matthews (Canadian Army officer) (1909–1991), Canadian general, businessman and politician
- Bruce Matthews, golf course architect; see List of golf course architects

== See also ==
- Brice Matthews (born 2002), American baseball player
