= Chambers Bay =

Golf course in University Place, Washington, US

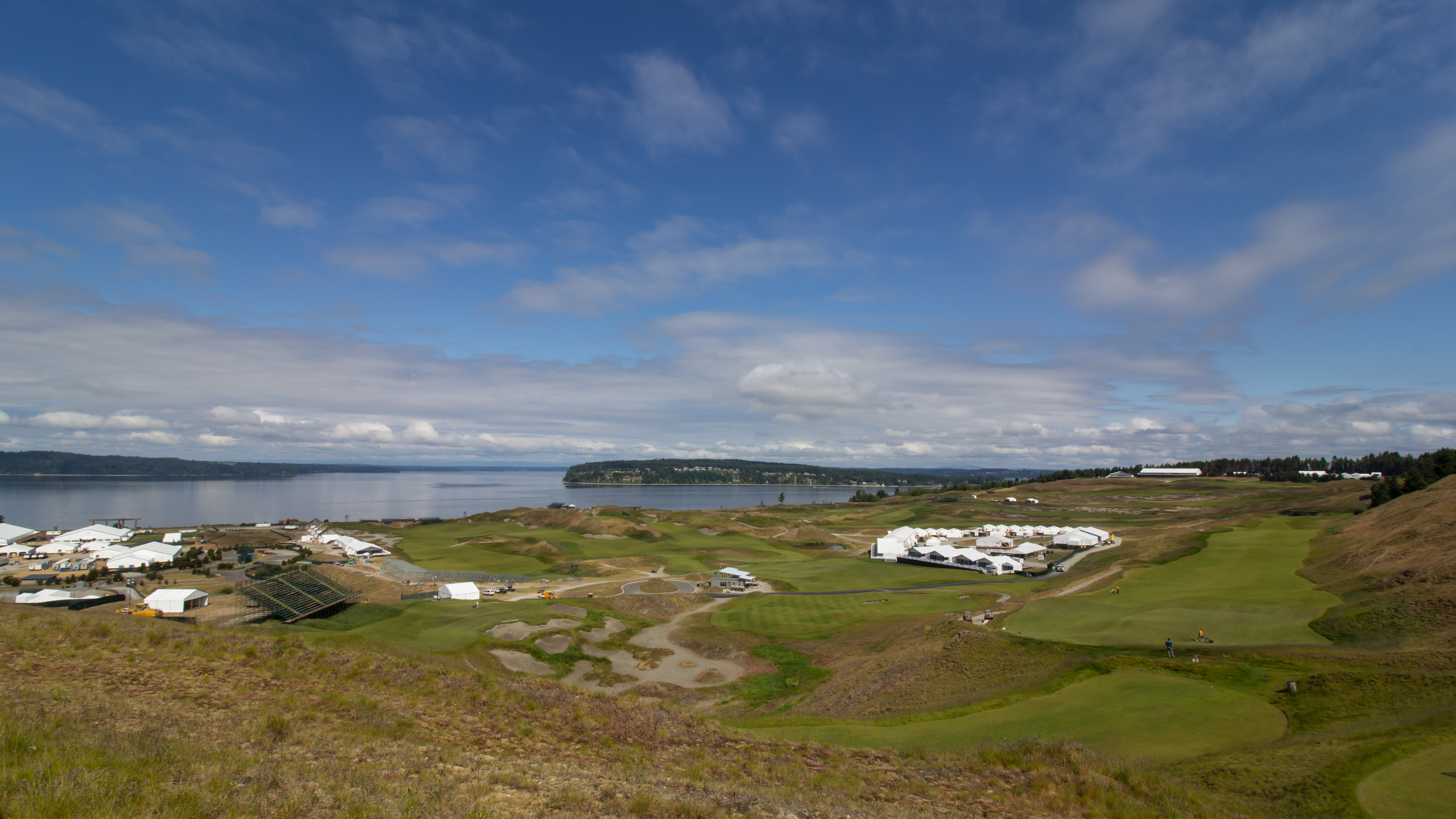
- View from south in 2015

- Location in the United States Location in Washington
- 47.20°N 122.57°W

Club information
- Location: University Place, Washington, U.S.
- Established: June 23, 2007; 19 years ago
- Type: Public
- Owner: Pierce County
- Operator: KemperSports
- Tota holes: 18
- Tournaments: U.S. Amateur (2010), U.S. Open (2015), U.S. Amateur Four-Ball (2021), U.S. Women's Amateur (2022)
- Greens: Poa annua (full green replacement 2017-2019), formerly fine fescue
- Website: chambersbaygolf.com
- Designed by: Robert Trent Jones Jr.
- Par: 72
- Length: 7,585 yards (6,936 m)
- Course rating: 74.3 (Navy)
- Slope rating: 139 (Navy)

Chambers Bay is a public golf course on Puget Sound southwest of Tacoma, Washington, United States, in the city of University Place. The British links-style course is owned by Pierce County and opened for play on June 23, 2007. It hosted the U.S. Amateur in 2010 and the U.S. Open in 2015.

== Design ==
Chambers Bay was designed by Robert Trent Jones Jr. The 250-acre (100 ha) course is the centerpiece of a 930-acre (380 ha) county park that also includes walking trails and other spaces. Pierce County bought the land, a former sand-and-gravel quarry, for $33 million in 1992; the property was popular with off-road four-wheelers and dirt-bikers for years while the park was under development.

Pierce County Executive John Ladenburg, himself a golfer, proposed the conversion of the quarry into a golf course with the intention of hosting the United States Open and other major golf championships. The proposal was controversial but was pushed through by Ladenburg, who also selected the design team and managers for the future course. The course's location was intended to resemble the Oregon Dunes and its design as a prominent public course was inspired by Torrey Pines Golf Course near San Diego; the course itself was British links-style due to the Pacific Northwest's similar climate. The course cost $20.7 million to build and was labeled "Ladenburg's Folly" by critics, but was well received by golfers.

== Construction ==
During construction, 1.4 million cubic yards (1.1 million m³) of dirt and sand (over 100,000 truckloads) were removed, cleaned off site, and returned to sculpt the course. At the time, it was still permitted as a working mine, which meant fewer restrictions for the course architects.

On February 8, 2008, USGA announced that Chambers Bay would host the 2015 U.S. Open. According to a USGA-commissioned financial analysis, the U.S. Open generated $134 million in economy development regionally, including $16.8 million in tax revenue. The event had approximately 110,000 unique visitors, of which one-third were from outside Washington state. To transport visitors for the tournament from Seattle, a Sounder commuter train platform was planned to be constructed at Chambers Bay. USGA and Sound Transit later cancelled plans for the train service, citing logistical and financial challenges.

== Layout ==
Five sets of tees are available, ranging from 5,250 to 7,585 yards (4,800 to 6,935 m), and as a municipal course, Pierce County residents receive discounted rates. The course is for walkers only, caddies are available but are optional. Motorized carts are permitted only for those with medical conditions or disabilities, and a caddie must be hired as the driver.

The greens do not have fringes - it is a transparent transition from fairway to green.

=== Card of the course ===
Chambers Bay
Tee	Rating/Slope	1	2	3	4	5	6	7	8	9	Out	10	11	12	13	14	15	16	17	18	In	Total
Navy	75.6 / 139	559	395	167	530	465	418	482	557	227	3800	398	457	281	485	496	139	396	172	541	3365	7165
Sand	72.4 / 135	501	365	145	480	441	369	449	523	202	3475	360	425	262	453	407	116	359	142	514	3038	6513
White	M:70.2/127 L:76.2/137	465	337	130	424	423	315	435	488	168	3185	330	402	246	437	383	103	323	119	487	2830	6015
SI	Men's	3	13	17	5	9	11	7	1	15		10	8	14	2	6	18	12	16	4
Par		5	4	3	5	4	4	4	5	3	37	4	4	4	4	4	3	4	3	5	35	72
SI	Women's	3	11	17	7	9	13	5	1	15		8	4	14	6	10	16	12	18	2
Blue	71.5 / 128	436	301	111	347	323	283	415	441	132	2789	311	378	219	348	309	91	279	92	462	2489	5278

Championship Tees

Hole	Name	Yards	Par	Hole	Name	Yards	Par
1	Puget Sound	598/496	5/4	10	High Dunes	436	4
2	Foxy	399	4	11	Shadows	537	4
3	Blown Out	198	3	12	The Narrows	311	4
4	Hazard's Ascent	495	4	13	Eagle Eye	534	4
5	Free Fall	488	4	14	Cape Fear	546	4
6	Deception Point	495	4	15	Lone Fir	246/167	3
7	Humpback	508	4	16	Beached	423	4
8	High Road Low Road	614	5	17	Derailed	218	3
9	Olympus	224/217	3	18	Tahoma	604/525	5/4
Out		4,019/3,910	36/35	In		3,855/3,697	35/34
Championship tees: Rating=78.1, Slope=146				Total		7,874/7,607	70

Navy Tees

Hole	Name	Yards	Par	Hole	Name	Yards	Par
1	Puget Sound	559	5	10	High Dunes	398	4
2	Foxy	395	4	11	Shadows	457	4
3	Blown Out	167	3	12	The Narrows	281	4
4	Hazard's Ascent	530	5	13	Eagle Eye	485	4
5	Free Fall	465	4	14	Cape Fear	496	4
6	Deception Point	418	4	15	Lone Fir	139	3
7	Humpback	482	4	16	Beached	396	4
8	High Road Low Road	557	5	17	Derailed	172	3
9	Olympus	227	3	18	Tahoma	541	5
Out		3,800	37	In		3,365	35
Navy tees: Rating=75.6, Slope=139				Total		7,165	72

Chambers Bay has just one tree, a Douglas fir behind the 15th green.

== Operation ==
The course is operated by Kemper Sports Management, which also operates the near by Lake Spanaway Golf Course in Spanaway. As well as Bandon Dunes on the Oregon coast.

The course is part of the Chambers Creek Properties which includes numerous non-golf recreational opportunities including a three-mile loop (5 km) walking trail, part of which travels through the west side of the golf course.

In 2016, a resort was proposed by a private developer, including an 80-room hotel, event and meeting space, and a Tom Douglas restaurant.

== Events ==
Chambers Bay was the site of the U.S. Amateur in 2010 and hosted the U.S. Open in 2015; these events were awarded by the United States Golf Association (USGA) in early 2008. Chambers Bay was set as a par-71 at 7,742 yards (7,079 m) for the U.S. Amateur in 2010, the longest course in USGA history. The record only lasted until the following year when Erin Hills surpassed it by 18 yards.

Eleven months prior to the event, the USGA announced in July 2014 that all final round tickets and weekly ticket passes for the 2015 U.S. Open were sold out. The tournament was eventually won by Jordan Spieth. Chambers Bay Golf Course hosted the 2021 edition of the U.S. Amateur Four-Ball, which replaced the U.S. Amateur Public Links Championship in 2015.

In May 2021, the USGA selected Chambers Bay to host the 2022 U.S. Women's Amateur, scheduled for August 8–14, 2022. The tournament was won by Saki Baba. In March 2023, the USGA selected Chambers Bay to host the 2027 U.S. Junior Amateur and 2033 U.S. Amateur.

== Criticism ==
During the 2015 U.S. Open, Chambers Bay was subject to criticism for its bumpy greens, unfair course design, and poor accessibility for spectators. Nine-time major champion Gary Player called it "the worst golf course I might've ever seen in the 63 years as a professional golfer," and Henrik Stenson said that the greens were like "putting on broccoli."

In 2017, the fine fescue greens were allowed to transition to poa annua, the dominant species. In the weeks leading up to the 2015 U.S. Open, warm and dry weather forced extra watering of the greens, which allowed the invasive poa to thrive.
