= Ship Sticks =

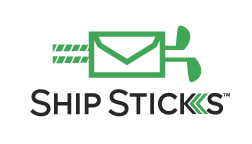
- Industry: Logistics and supply chain
- Founded: 2011
- Founder: Jonathan Marsico, Nicholas Coleman
- Headquarters: West Palm Beach, US
- Number of employees: 20
- Website: Official website

Ship Sticks LLC, founded in 2011, is a private specialty shipping company based in West Palm Beach, Florida. It was founded by Jonathan Marsico and Nicholas Coleman, its CEO. It offers a service where customers' golf clubs, skis or other luggage are shipped to them at a desired destination. It allows scheduling of shipment dates, pickup and insurance: a $200 consequential insurance and $1,000 loss insurance.

Ship Sticks uses an online interface that enables the user to select from partner pre-loaded golf courses (such as Bandon Dunes, Grand del Mar or PGA National). This in turn enables quicker pick-ups and drop-offs from these partner courses.

The company partners with FedEx, UPS and DHL to ship clubs, luggage, and skis to over 220 destinations worldwide. Using corporate big volume discounts, route selection according to the origin and target destinations, and due to the gradual decrease of shipping costs worldwide, the company offers its service for approximately half the price of using FedEx or UPS individually.

Ship Sticks has seen triple-digit growth since it was founded, and has launched shipskis.com as another vertical that specializes in shipping snow skis and snowboards.
