= Queenwood (disambiguation) =

Queenwood may refer to:

== Australia ==
- Queenwood School for Girls, a primary and secondary day school for girls in Sydney
- Queenwood, Western Australia, a local in the Shire of Donnybrook–Balingup

== New Zealand ==
- Queenwood, a suburb in northern Hamilton in New Zealand

== United Kingdom ==
- Queenwood College, was a Public School near Stockbridge, Hampshire, England
- Queenwood Golf Club, a golf club near Ottershaw in Surrey, England
