= Tavistock Cup =

Team golf event

The Tavistock Cup was a team golf event played in Florida that featured the top-ranked professional members of six international golf clubs: Albany, Isleworth, Lake Nona, Oak Tree Golf Club, Primland, and Queenwood. The two-day tournament was an officially sanctioned, unofficial-money PGA Tour event. The inaugural Tavistock Cup matches were held at Lake Nona Golf & Country Club in 2004.

The event was created by the Bahamas-based private equity company Tavistock Group which, with Tiger Woods and Ernie Els, owns the Bahamian Albany club.

Through 2010, the Tavistock Cup was contested by Isleworth and Lake Nona golf clubs. In 2011, the Tavistock Cup was expanded with the addition of teams representing the Albany, and Queenwood of Surrey, England. Queenwood became the first golf club not developed by Tavistock Group to participate in the Tavistock Cup. In 2013, the Tavistock Cup expanded to a six-team competition by adding Oak Tree National and Primland golf clubs. The following year, the event came to an end when it was supplanted by Tiger Woods' Hero World Challenge.
