= Old Elm Club =

Private golf club in Highland Park, Illinois, U.S.

- Interactive map of Old Elm Club
- 42.2177°N 87.8300°W

Club information
- Location: Highland Park, Illinois, U.S.
- Established: 1913
- Type: Private
- Total holes: 18
- Designer: H. S. Colt; Donald Ross
- Par: 72

Old Elm Club is a private, men-only golf club in Highland Park, Illinois, on Chicago's North Shore. In 2021, after Augusta National and Pine Valley had both admitted women, Golf Digest listed Old Elm among the "couple handfuls" of all-male clubs that remained in the United States. Its men-only policy has drawn criticism in local news coverage. The club was formed in 1913 by a group of business leaders who wanted a less crowded alternative to the Onwentsia Club, and it opened in June 1914. The course was laid out by the British architect H. S. (Harry) Colt and built under the supervision of Donald Ross. Golf Course Architecture magazine has called it "the only golf course on earth touched by the hands of both Colt and Ross".

Beginning in 2010, the club restored Colt's design in work led first by the architect Drew Rogers and later by David Zinkand. The project removed hundreds of trees, rebuilt the bunkers in Colt's style and was completed in 2025. The course was ranked 94th in Golf magazine's 2024–25 Top 100 Courses in the U.S. and 149th in Golf Digest's 2025 list of America's Second 100 Greatest Golf Courses.

== History ==
=== Founding ===
According to the Lake Forest–Lake Bluff History Museum, the founders got the idea for a new kind of club after a long wait on a crowded afternoon at the Onwentsia Club. The Chicago Daily Tribune described them as "men whose minutes are reckoned in hundreds of dollars". The founders were business leaders, with surnames including Armour, Schweppe, Dick, Swift, Shedd, Palmer, Field and McCormick. They meant Old Elm to complement Onwentsia rather than compete with it: Onwentsia would serve their families and the community, and Old Elm would serve the founders themselves, for "peaceful recreation".

When the club opened in June 1914, membership was limited to 150 men. Unlike other courses in the area, Old Elm did not restrict golf on Sundays. The museum says this caused "a great uproar" in Lake Forest. The club took its name from a large elm near the entrance to the grounds. In 1913 members estimated the tree to be 193 years old, and it died of Dutch elm disease in 1958. The Spanish-style clubhouse, which had a patio with a retractable roof, was designed by the club's vice president, Benjamin Marshall.

=== Colt and Ross ===
Colt made two extended tours of North America before the First World War. While passing through Chicago, he drew up a design for the new club in Highland Park, and there he met Ross. In his notes to the club, Colt referred to the younger architect as "Douglas" Ross. As was his usual practice, Colt did not stay for construction; he left drawings, plans and instructions and recommended that the club let Ross handle the work. According to Golf Digest, the two worked together on site, and after Colt left, Ross oversaw construction of the holes from Colt's drawings and design notes. One of Golf magazine's course raters wrote that the founding members "were familiar with the work of both Ross and Colt, and elected Colt to design, and Ross to build". The routing and bunkering are usually credited to Colt, and the greens to Ross.

=== Early years ===
A 1923 article in Golf Illustrated called Old Elm "An Eveless Eden" and stressed the club's calm atmosphere. In the club's first two decades, women were admitted only once. In August 1918, during World War I, the board of governors hosted a Red Cross benefit match.

== Course ==
The course has 18 holes and plays to a par of 72. Golf magazine and its raters have highlighted the crowned greens on the second and fifth holes, a double green shared by the sixth and 17th holes, and Colt's "pulpit green locations".

=== Restoration ===
In 2015 Golf Course Architecture wrote that Colt's original design had been, to an extent, "subsumed by the better-known Ross influence". The club hired the Ohio-based architect Drew Rogers to identify and restore as much of Colt's work as possible. Rogers began master planning in 2010, working with the club's superintendent, Curtis James. Working from Colt's original plans, sketches and notes, they removed hundreds of trees over several years, reopening Colt's intended hole corridors and restoring fairway width.

For the greens and bunkers, the restoration team brought in David Zinkand, then a design associate at Coore & Crenshaw. Zinkand said that "Ross's greens were beyond reproach" and that the team changed only areas that could no longer hold hole locations because of decades of topdressing and modern green speeds. The bunkers were reshaped with the irregular, "torn" edges that Colt had written about early in his career. In February 2025, Zinkand Golf Design said it had finished restoring the bunkers and greens. The whole course was regrassed at the same time, and Zinkand made subtle changes to the contours of six greens, including the Redan 17th. As of 2025, Zinkand's firm was the club's architect of record.

== Membership ==
The original 150 members were hand-picked, and a vacancy could arise only through a member's death or resignation. In 2015 Golf Course Architecture wrote that the club's "small membership is still all male" and that it "maintains a very low profile, with almost no visitor play". In 2012 NBC Chicago reported that Old Elm was one of four men-only golf clubs in the Chicago area, two of which were in Highland Park. It said that such clubs, as a rule, admitted no women as golfers or guests or in their clubhouses, and that Old Elm let women inside once a year, at Christmastime, to buy holiday gifts in the pro shop. Veronica Arreola, a professor who studies gender issues at the University of Illinois at Chicago, told the station that such policies signal to women "that they are second-class citizens".

After Augusta National Golf Club offered membership to two women in August 2012, the Daily Herald listed Old Elm among four local men's-only clubs. Old Elm's representatives did not return the newspaper's calls. Marlene Miller, a member of the Illinois Women's Golf Association Hall of Fame, told the paper that refusing women members could have negative consequences. She cited Butler National Golf Club, which lost the Western Open after the PGA Tour and the United States Golf Association decided not to hold tournaments at clubs with exclusionary membership policies.

In 2021, after Augusta National and Pine Valley had both admitted women, Golf Digest listed Old Elm among the "couple handfuls" of all-male clubs that remained in the United States.

== Recognition ==
Golf magazine's state rankings have placed Old Elm sixth in Illinois for 2020–21, third for 2022–23 and fourth for 2024–25. Old Elm entered the magazine's 2024–25 list of the Top 100 Courses in the U.S. at 94th, one of 11 newcomers.

Golf Digest ranked Old Elm 149th on its list of America's Second 100 Greatest Golf Courses published in May 2025, up from 164th in the previous edition. On the magazine's 2025–26 ranking of the best courses in Illinois, Old Elm was eighth.
