= Donald Steel =

English golf course architect

Donald Maclennan Arklay Steel (born 23 August 1937) is a former golfer and is a noted golf course designer, as well as being a writer and journalist. Educated at Fettes College and Christ's College, Cambridge, he has designed a large number of golf courses or modifications to existing courses, mostly in the United Kingdom and Ireland. Several late 20th century and early 21st century golf course architects worked under Steel in their early careers, among them Martin Ebert, Jonathan Gaunt, Tom Mackenzie.

Steel has also written a number of books about golf. He was golf correspondent for the Sunday Telegraph from its launch in 1961 until 1989, and has written for Country Life since 1983. In 1957, he played cricket for Buckinghamshire in the Minor Counties Championship, making six appearances.

== Golf courses (new) ==
- Abaco Club
- Amarilla
- Dolce Campo Real
- Aquidneck Club
- Barnham Broom (Hill)
- Barseback (Pine)
- Bom Sucesso
- Boothferry Golf Club
- Bovey Castle
- Bradfield
- Byneset Golf Club
- Carnegie Course at Skibo Castle
- Château des Vigiers
- Charterhouse
- Harrow School
- Radley
- Rye Hill
- Mill Ride Ascot
- St. Andrews (Strathtyrum),
- Victoria Golf and Country Resort, Digana, Sri Lanka
- Wellington
- Woodhall Spa (Bracken)

== Golf courses (renovations) ==
- Royal St. George's
- St. Andrews (Eden), 1989
- St. Andrews (Jubilee),
- Royal County Down
- The Machrie
- Greensboro Country Club (The Farm), Greensboro, NC
