= River Hills, Wisconsin =

Village in Milwaukee County, Wisconsin

- Village
- Location of River Hills in Milwaukee County, Wisconsin.
- Coordinates: 43°9′55″N 87°55′57″W
- Country: United States
- State: Wisconsin
- County: Milwaukee
- Incorporated: 1930; 96 years ago

Area
  - Total: 5.33 sq mi (13.81 km^{2})
  - Land: 5.15 sq mi (13.35 km^{2})
  - Water: 0.17 sq mi (0.45 km^{2})
- Elevation: 709 ft (216 m)

Population (2020)
  - Total: 1,602
  - Density: 305.5/sq mi (117.95/km^{2})
- Time zone: UTC-6 (Central (CST))
  - Summer (DST): UTC-5 (CDT)
- Area code: 414
- FIPS code: 55-68325
- GNIS feature ID: 1572350
- Website: www.riverhillswi.com

River Hills is a village in Milwaukee County, Wisconsin, United States. The population was 1,602 at the 2020 census. A suburb of Milwaukee, it is part of the Milwaukee metropolitan area.

== History ==
In the early 19th century, the River Hills area was controlled by Native Americans, including the Menominee, Potawatomi, and Sauk people. The Menominee surrendered the land east of the Milwaukee River to the United States Federal Government through the Treaty of Washington in 1832. In 1833, the Potawatomi surrendered the land west of the river by signing the 1833 Treaty of Chicago, which (after being ratified in 1835) required them to leave Wisconsin by 1838. The land was organized as part of the Town of Milwaukee in 1835, and much of the land was bought by land speculators, who cleared the old-growth forests for timber. The first permanent white settlers were Joel and Cephas Buttles. The latter owned 160 acres in River Hills and built a cabin in 1843. In the mid-1840s, many families of Dutch settlers began arriving in the Town of Milwaukee to farm the land, but by the 1870s most of the residents were German farmers. The community was primarily agricultural until the 1920s.

In 1911, the Milwaukee Country Club relocated from Shorewood to a site on the western bank of the Milwaukee River in present-day River Hills. The club includes a golf course, and also organized polo matches fox hunts as late as the 1960s. In the 1920s, many wealthy Milwaukee families built summer estates on multi-acre plots near the county club, which served as the community's social center. The wealthy residents were often at odds with the neighboring farms of the Town of Milwaukee, and in 1930 they incorporated River Hills as a village with carefully crafted zoning laws, requiring that houses be built on lots at least one acre in size and banning commercial and industrial from the municipal boundaries. River Hills is the only community in Milwaukee County that is zoned one-hundred percent residential, and eighty-five percent of residential lots are over five acres. The only properties that are not private residences are the country club, the Lynden Sculpture Garden, several churches and synagogues, a public elementary school, and the campus of the private University School of Milwaukee. From 1956 until 1971, the village was also home to a Nike missile silo.

== Geography ==
River Hills is located at 43°9′55″N 87°55′57″W (43.165142, -87.932566).

According to the United States Census Bureau, the village has a total area of 5.31 square miles (13.75 km^{2}), of which 5.13 square miles (13.29 km^{2}) is land and 0.18 square miles (0.47 km^{2}) is water.

== Demographics ==
Historical population
Census	Pop.	Note	%±
1940	541		—
1950	567		4.8%
1960	1,257		121.7%
1970	1,561		24.2%
1980	1,642		5.2%
1990	1,612		−1.8%
2000	1,631		1.2%
2010	1,597		−2.1%
2020	1,602		0.3%
U.S. Decennial Census

=== 2010 census ===
As of the census of 2010, there were 1,597 people, 595 households, and 492 families living in the village. The population density was 311.3 inhabitants per square mile (120.2/km^{2}). There were 647 housing units at an average density of 126.1 per square mile (48.7/km^{2}). The racial makeup of the village was 82.3% White, 6.3% African American, 0.3% Native American, 7.5% Asian, 1.0% from other races, and 2.7% from two or more races. Hispanic or Latino of any race were 4.1% of the population.

There were 595 households, of which 32.6% had children under the age of 18 living with them, 74.6% were married couples living together, 5.4% had a female householder with no husband present, 2.7% had a male householder with no wife present, and 17.3% were non-families. 15.3% of all households were made up of individuals, and 6.7% had someone living alone who was 65 years of age or older. The average household size was 2.68 and the average family size was 2.97.

The median age in the village was 49.5 years. 24% of residents were under the age of 18; 4.5% were between the ages of 18 and 24; 14% were from 25 to 44; 38.5% were from 45 to 64; and 19.1% were 65 years of age or older. The gender makeup of the village was 48.7% male and 51.3% female.

=== 2000 census ===
As of the census of 2000, there were 1,631 people, 590 households, and 493 families living in the village. The population density was 320.3 people per square mile (123.7/km^{2}). There were 617 housing units at an average density of 121.2 per square mile (46.8/km^{2}). The racial makeup of the village was 85.71% White, 4.90% African American, 0.12% Native American, 7.54% Asian, 0.06% from other races, and 1.66% from two or more races. Hispanic or Latino of any race were 2.08% of the population.

There were 590 households, out of which 33.4% had children under the age of 18 living with them, 77.8% were married couples living together, 3.7% had a female householder with no husband present, and 16.3% were non-families. 12.7% of all households were made up of individuals, and 4.7% had someone living alone who was 65 years of age or older. The average household size was 2.76 and the average family size was 3.02.

In the village, the population was spread out, with 24.5% under the age of 18, 4.8% from 18 to 24, 18.8% from 25 to 44, 37.0% from 45 to 64, and 14.8% who were 65 years of age or older. The median age was 46 years. For every 100 females, there were 100.9 males. For every 100 females age 18 and over, there were 99.2 males.

The median income for a household in the village was $161,292, and the median income for a family was $181,443, but the central regions of River Hills tend to be much wealthier than the outlying regions. Males had a median income of $100,000 versus $54,167 for females. The per capita income for the village was $94,479. About 0.4% of families and 1.7% of the population were below the poverty line, including 1.3% of those under age 18 and 1.3% of those age 65 or over.

== Education ==
The school districts are Maple Dale-Indian Hill School District (elementary) and the Nicolet Union High School District.

== Notable person ==
- Giannis Antetokounmpo, NBA player for the Milwaukee Bucks
- Toby Crabel (born 1955), hedge fund manager and tennis player.
