= KemperSports =

Chicago golf course and hospitality management company

KemperSports is a privately held golf course and hospitality management company founded in 1978 by Steven H. Lesnik and James S. Kemper, Jr., president and chairman of the board of Kemper Insurance. The company began with the management of Kemper Lakes Golf Club in Kildeer, Illinois (United States), an upscale public golf course in the Chicago area.

Based in Northbrook, Illinois, KemperSports builds, owns and manages golf courses, private clubs, resorts, athletic clubs, lodging venues and restaurants, and has more than 7,000 employees. Its clients include owners and developers of golf courses and hospitality venues, financial institutions and municipalities. The company's management portfolio includes Bandon Dunes Golf Resort, titled the No. 1 Golf Resort in North America by Golf Digest and Golf Magazine; The Glen Club; Desert Willow Golf Resort; Chambers Bay, host of the 2010 U.S. Amateur and the 2015 U.S. Open.; and owns Streamsong Golf Resort.

KemperSports was named the Club Management Company of the Year in 2012 by BoardRoom magazine. and was named by Crain's Chicago Business and one of the Best Places to Work in Chicago in 2024. The company is led by CEO Steven K. Skinner and Chief Operating Officer Jeremy Goldblatt.
