= TPC Stonebrae =

Golf club in Hayward, California

Stonebrae Country Club
Club information
- Location: Hayward, California, United States
- Established: 2007
- Type: Private
- Owner: YCS Investments
- Operator: Stonebrae Club Partners, LLC
- Tota holes: 18
- Tournaments: Ellie Mae Classic
- Website: www.stonebraecc.com
- Designed by: David McLay Kidd
- Par: 72
- Length: 7,188 yards
- Course record: 58 Stephan Jaeger (2016)

Stonebrae Country Club, formerly TPC Stonebrae, formerly TPC San Francisco Bay, is an American links style golf course and private golf club located at Stonebrae Country Club in the hills above Hayward, California on the eastern side of the San Francisco Bay Area. Stonebrae Country Club is currently the newest Country Club in the San Francisco Bay Area and has a top 10 course rating in Northern California.

Stonebrae Country Club opened in 2007. The following year, the David McLay Kidd designed championship golf course became part of the Tournament Players Club network operated by the PGA Tour and was rebranded as the TPC San Francisco Bay and then the TPC Stonebrae. As of January 1st, 2024, TPC Stonebrae was rebranded to Stonebrae Country Club. It is owned and operated by YCS Investments, an investment company of the family behind King Fook Holdings.

Upon opening in 2007, Stonebrae has received the following awards: "Northern California’s Best New Course" (LINKS Magazine, 2007), "One of the Best New Golf Courses" (Travel + Leisure Golf, 2007), "6th Best New Private Course in America" (Golf Digest, 2008), 2015 National Private Course Winner for Environmental Leaders in Golf Awards (ELGA) presented by Golf Digest, Merit Winner for Private Facility – 2007, 2008, 2009, 2010, 2011, 2013, 2014, 2015, 2016 (Environmental Leaders in Golf Awards (ELGA)).

From 2008 until 2019, Stonebrae was the host venue for the variously named Ellie Mae Classic at TPC Stonebrae, a tournament on the Korn Ferry Tour. The event was not held in 2013 due to the construction of a new clubhouse.

In 2014 the club opened a new 32,000 sq. foot Clubhouse that was named as 2014's "2nd Best New Clubhouse in the World" by Golf INC Magazine.

In 2016 at the Ellie Mae Classic at Stonebrae, Stephan Jaeger set the 18 hole scoring record of 58 at a PGA Tour sanctioned event in the first round of the Ellie Mae Classic and the lowest 72 Hole Tournament aggregate score in history at a PGA Tour sanctioned event.

in 2017 at the Ellie Mae Classic at Stonebrae, Stephen Curry of the Golden State Warriors, received a Sponsors Exemption into the Tournament. During his professional golf debut, Stephen Curry recorded first and second round scores of 74. Curry returned to play in the 2018 event, again missing the cut with scores of 71-86.

== Scorecard ==
TPC Stonebrae
Tee	Rating/Slope	1	2	3	4	5	6	7	8	9	Out	10	11	12	13	14	15	16	17	18	In	Total
Gold	74.8 / 138	396	461	193	479	326	606	176	466	438	3541	437	240	625	160	377	188	557	465	598	3647	7188
Blue	72 / 133	370	385	176	462	301	576	159	433	407	3269	397	204	571	138	321	156	469	436	554	3246	6515
White	69.4 / 128	332	342	164	443	274	562	142	390	362	3011	350	175	544	124	279	150	437	424	537	3020	6031
SI	Men's	9	7	15	11	13	1	17	3	5		6	16	4	18	14	8	12	10	2
Par		4	4	3	5	4	5	3	4	4	36	4	3	5	3	4	3	5	4	5	36	72
SI	Women's	9	11	17	13	7	1	15	3	5		2	12	18	16	14	18	10	4	6
Red	67.1 / 115	267	229	129	364	224	422	85	316	278	2314	270	149	478	99	253	129	339	336	407	2460	4774
