= Jonathan Gaunt =

Golf course architect

Jonathan Gaunt is a golf course architect, a member of the EIGCA and the director of Gaunt Golf Design.

Gaunt or his company have designed over 30 golf courses since 1987, mostly in the UK. These include Ramside Hall Hotel and Golf Club in Durham, Chesfield Downs Family Golf Centre in Hertfordshire, and Linden Hall Hotel & Spa in Northumberland. He was involved in the redesign of the Wike Ridge course at Leeds Golf Centre that completed in 2013.
