= Swinley Forest Golf Club =

Golf club in Berkshire, England

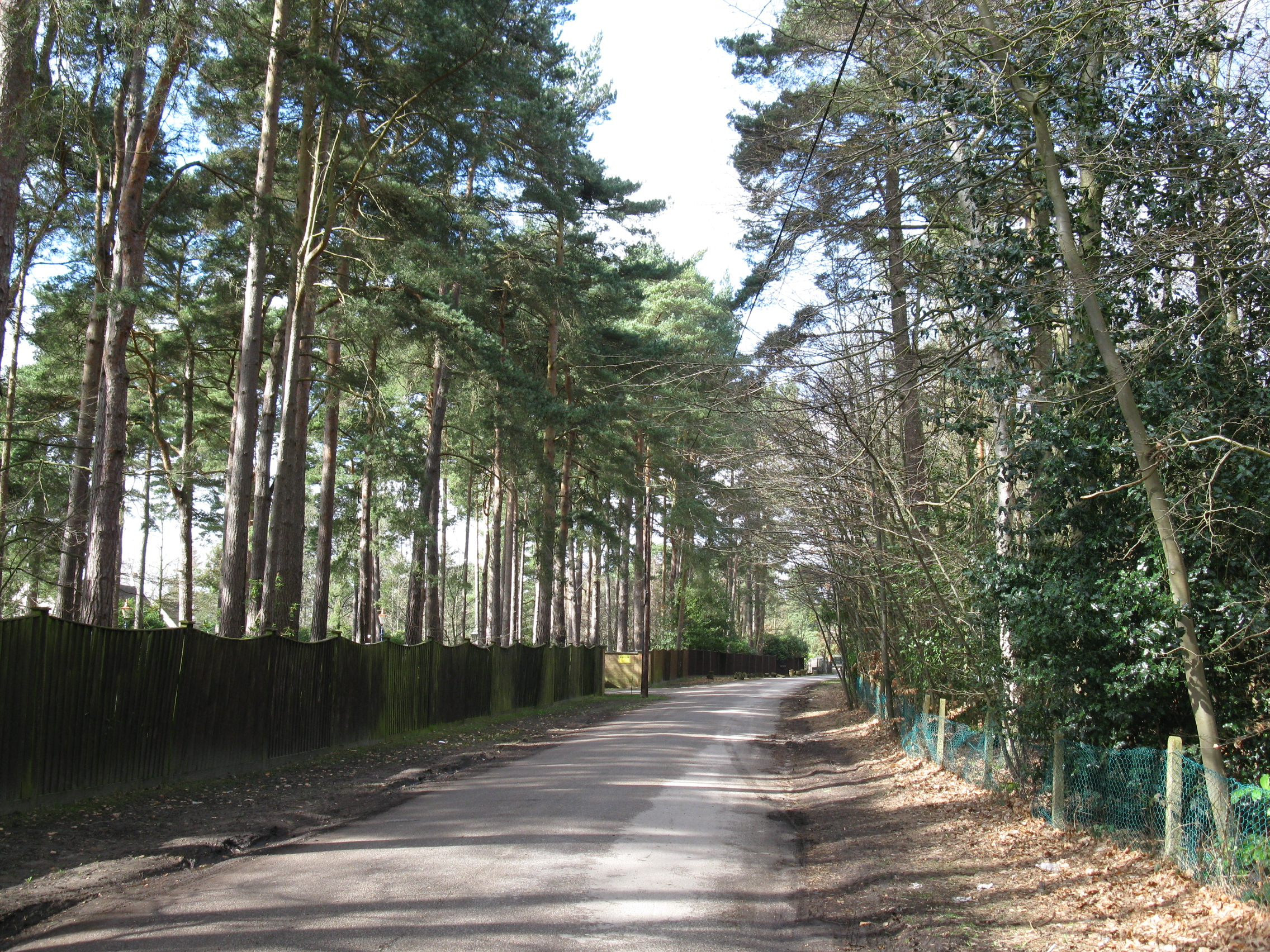
- Private road, leading to the club

- Location within Berkshire
- 51°22′46″N 0°41′33″W

Club information
- Location: Near Ascot, Berkshire, England
- Established: 1909
- Tota holes: 18
- Website: https://www.swinleyfgc.co.uk/

Swinley Forest Golf Club is a golf club located in Swinley Forest off Coronation Road, three miles southwest of Ascot, Berkshire, England. It was established in 1909. The course measures a little over 6,000 yards (5,500 m) and was designed by Harry Colt who described it as his "least bad course." Colt routed the course over gently undulating heathland.

Most golf courses in the United Kingdom welcome some type of guest play. However, Swinley Forest remains one of the most private golf clubs in the United Kingdom.
