= Old Sandwich Road =

Road in Plymouth, Massachusetts

Old Sandwich Road is a road in Plymouth, Massachusetts, and also is the second oldest public road in the United States. First used as a path by Wampanoag members, the road has been gradually upgraded over the years to become a main road. Old Sandwich Golf Club, which is one of the top 100 golf courses in America, is named after Old Sandwich Road.
