= John Stanton Fleming Morrison =

British golf course architect

John Morrison
Personal information
- Full name: John Stanton Fleming Morrison
- Born: 17 April 1892; West Jesmond, Newcastle upon Tyne, Northumberland, England
- Died: 28 January 1961 (aged 68); Farnham, Surrey, England
- Batting: Right-handed

Domestic team information
- Years: Team
- 1912–1919: Cambridge University
- 1920: Somerset
- 1921–1922: Marylebone Cricket Club

Career statistics
Competition	FC
Matches	38
Runs scored	1982
Batting average	30.49
100s/50s	4/8
Top score	233*
Balls bowled	24
Wickets	1
Bowling average	6.00
5 wickets in innings	0
10 wickets in match	0
Best bowling	1/6
Catches/stumpings	21/4
- Source: Cricinfo, 22 December 2015

John Stanton Fleming Morrison DFC (17 April 1892 – 28 January 1961) was a British golf course architect born in Newcastle-on-Tyne, UK. He worked predominantly with Charles Alison, Harry Colt, and Alister MacKenzie, in 1928 forming Colt, Alison & Morrison Ltd.

John Morrison was educated at Charterhouse School and Trinity College, Cambridge, where his studies in history and law extended from 1912 to 1919, interrupted by his war service. He was a bomber pilot during World War I and a Group Captain in the RAF during World War II. He was among the first pilots to land an airplane on an aircraft carrier. He was awarded the DFC and bar.

In his younger years, he was a talented all-round sportsman, representing England at football as an amateur and playing first-class cricket with Cambridge University and Somerset. He won Blues for cricket, football and golf. He also won the Belgian Amateur Golf Championship in 1929. In 1914, he scored 233 not out for Cambridge against Marylebone Cricket Club, batting for only 165 minutes. At the time, it was a record first-class score for Cambridge and a record for the Fenner's ground.

He became the managing director of Colt, Alison and Morrison in 1952 after his partners died, and he remained in that position until his death in 1961. He married twice and had one daughter.
