= Queenwood Golf Club =

Golf club near Ottershaw in Surrey, England

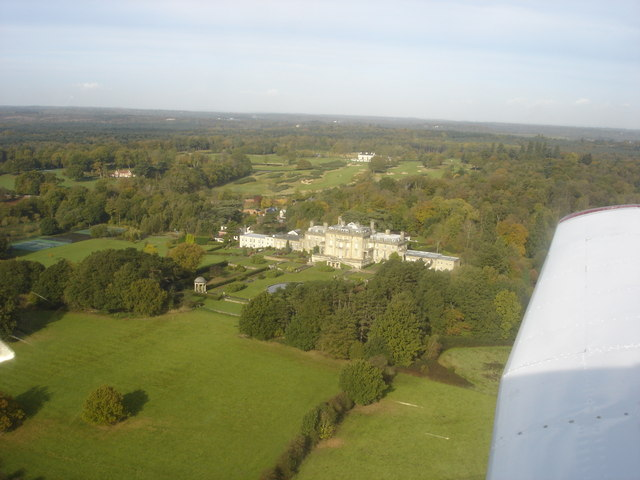
- The Queenwood club house is in the background of this aerial photograph of Ottershaw Park taken in 2008

- Location within Surrey
- 51°21′50″N 0°33′2″W

Club information
- Location: Near Ottershaw, Surrey, England
- Established: 2001
- Tota holes: 18
- Website: https://www.queenwood.co.uk

Queenwood Golf Club is a golf club near Ottershaw in Surrey, England. The club is only open to members and their guests.

The club was developed by the American entrepreneur Frederick D. Green. The American businessman Walter Forbes was also involved in the creation of the club. Green had previously developed the Eagle Springs and Nantucket golf clubs in the United States. It was designed by David McLay Kidd and opened in 2001. On his website McLay Kidd stated that he aimed for Queenwood to be a departure from that "modern style" that had led to recent expensive club closures and a "return to the heathland traditions" of the courses at the famed nearby clubs of Sunningdale Golf Club, Walton Heath Golf Club, Woking Golf Club, and Swinley Forest Golf Club. McLay Kidd employed the extensive use of heather as a design element "both for its strategic and aesthetic values, most notably on the bunker faces. It took a good five years to grow in to the fullest, and now that it has, everyone seems to understand why I insisted on using the heather so extensively".

Golf Monthly magazine listed the club as one of the '10 Most Exclusive Golf Clubs In the UK', writing that "When it comes to exclusive golf clubs, Queenwood is one of the world's leaders. Little is known about the super-private Surrey club which has a phenomenal golf course always kept in pristine condition".

== Membership ==
A 2005 article in The Guardian stated that the membership of Queenwood was limited to 350 and included the actors Michael Douglas, Hugh Grant, and Catherine Zeta-Jones among its members as well as professional golfers Darren Clarke and Ernie Els. Els wrote of the Queenwood course that "The practice facilities are so good they wouldn't be out of place at a professional tour event and generally there are not many people around so I can concentrate fully on my game."

The American diplomat James Rubin and the British strategist and diarist Alastair Campbell played several times at the club in 2006 and 2007. Campbell described the club in his diaries as "Height of luxury ... Caddies, club cleaners, shoe polishers really OTT and luxurious, lots of banker wanker types". The Queenwood's no-mobile-phone policy was waived as Campbell took calls on the golf course from Prime Minister Tony Blair. Campbell also played at Queenwood with the footballer Jamie Redknapp and the solicitor David Mills and met Gary Lineker there.
