= Barnbougle Dunes =

Golf course in Tasmania

Barnbougle Dunes Golf Links
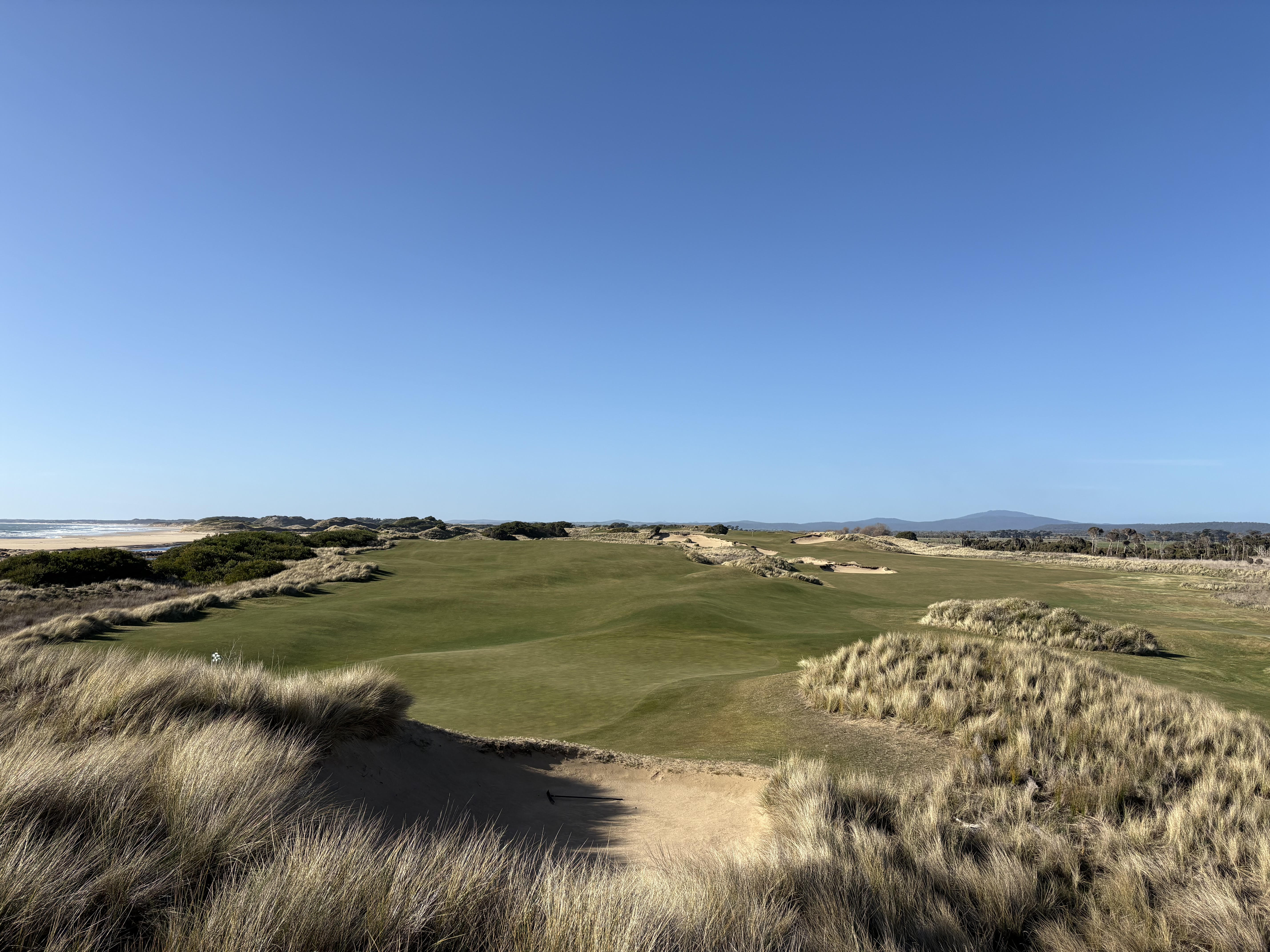
- The 10th and 18th holes at Barnbougle Dunes
- Interactive map of Barnbougle Dunes Golf Links
- 41°00′18″S 147°26′16″E

Club information
- Location: Bridport, Tasmania
- Established: 2005; 21 years ago
- Type: public
- Tota holes: 18
- Website: https://barnbougle.com.au/
- Designed by: Tom Doak and Mike Clayton

Barnbougle Dunes Golf Links is a golf course located near the seaside village of Bridport in Tasmania's North-East. The 18 hole championship layout was designed by course architects Tom Doak and Mike Clayton, and is set among sand dunes overlooking Bass Strait. The course has been highly rated since opening in 2005, recognised as Australia's number one public access course, and fifth best course of any sort in Australia. Barnbougle Dunes is the first new Australian course to enter the World's Top 100 courses since rankings began, coming in at 49 after its first appraisal. It improved to be ranked the 35th best course in the world in 2009, and was ranked the 12th best links course in the world. A 2025 ranking of World's Top 100 Golf courses rated Barnbougle Dunes at 25.

Golf Odyssey, the preeminent newsletter devoted to golf travel, called Barnbougle Dunes "a piece of golfing heaven," following its January 2007 review.

Golfing tragic Greg Ramsay dreamed up the idea of building the course, and tourism entrepreneur and farmer Richard Sattler developed the concept with Ramsay, Doak and well known Melbourne golf identity Mike Clayton. The layout is not long, but certainly presents a tough assignment, particularly when the wind is blowing hard, as it often does in this part of Tasmania.

There are dozens of accommodation villas on-site, as well as a restaurant and conference facility perched on the dunes, looking north over the Strait. The Barnbougle Bus offers a transfer service from the city of Launceston – around one hour from Bridport – the nearest major airport offering regular commercial airline flights from mainland Australia.

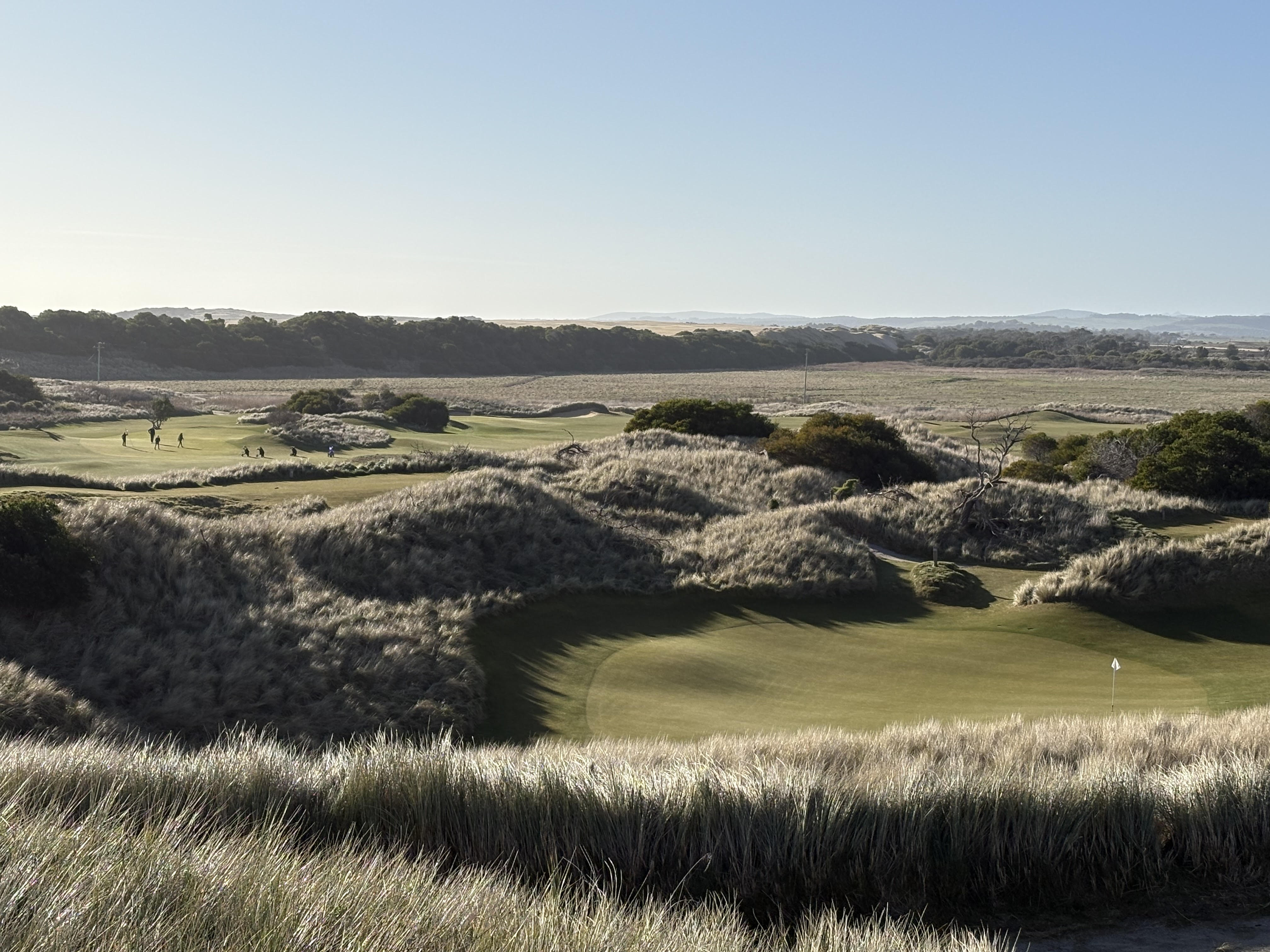
View of Lost Farm and Bougle Run golf courses

In 2010, a second 18 hole golf course, Lost Farm, opened adjacent to Barnbougle Dunes, designed by Bill Coore and Ben Crenshaw. A third course, Bougle Run, also designed by Bill Coore, composed mainly of par 3s, with only 14 holes, was opened in 2021.

== See also ==
- List of links golf courses
