= Charles Hugh Alison =

British golf course architect

Charlie Alison
Personal information
- Full name: Charles Hugh Alison
- Born: 5 March 1883; Preston, Lancashire, England
- Died: 20 October 1952 (aged 69); Woodstock, Cape Town, South Africa

Domestic team information
- Years: Team
- 1902–1905: Somerset
- 1911–1912: Buckinghamshire

Career statistics
Competition	First-class
Matches	4
Runs scored	36
Batting average	12.00
100s/50s	0/0
Top score	20
Balls bowled	12
Wickets	0
Bowling average	–
5 wickets in innings	0
10 wickets in match	0
Best bowling	0/23
Catches/stumpings	3/–
- Source: CricketArchive, 16 November 2012

Charles Hugh Alison (5 March 1883 – 20 October 1952) was a British golf course designer. He worked predominantly with Harry Colt, John Morrison, and Alister MacKenzie, in 1928 forming Colt, Alison & Morrison Ltd.

== Life and career ==
Alison was born in Preston, Lancashire. He attended Malvern College in Worcestershire before going up to New College, Oxford, to study history, law and divinity. He represented the university at golf in 1903 and 1904, but did not finish his degree. He also played four first-class cricket matches for Somerset County Cricket Club between 1902 and 1905 and played Minor Counties cricket for Buckinghamshire in 1911 and 1912.

Alison served in both World War I and World War II decoding ciphers.

One of Alison's most-respected designs is Milwaukee Country Club (1929), co-designed with Colt, which was ranked among the Top 50 golf courses in America by Golf Digest in 2007. Another endearing Colt-Alison design is Century Country Club (1927) in Purchase, New York. On 26 April 1922, The New York Times announced that Colt, MacKenzie & Alison of London would be developing the new Century golf course on 180 acres (0.73 km^{2}) of pristine countryside. The course's architects are listed as Colt and Alison but MacKenzie's influence is imbued throughout the 18 holes. He was one of the founding members of the International Society of Golf Architects in 1929.

On a trip to Japan in 1930 he laid down principles that guided Japanese golf course design throughout the 20th century.

Alison and his wife moved to South Africa in 1947. He worked on several South African golf courses before his death in Cape Town in 1952.
