= Harry Colt =

English golf course architect

- Born: Henry Shapland Colt; 4 August 1869; Highgate, London, United Kingdom
- Died: 21 November 1951 (aged 82); United Kingdom
- Education: Clare College
- Occupations: Golf course architect; golf course designer
- Years active: c. 1910s to 1951
- Employer(s): Colt, Alison & Morrison Ltd.

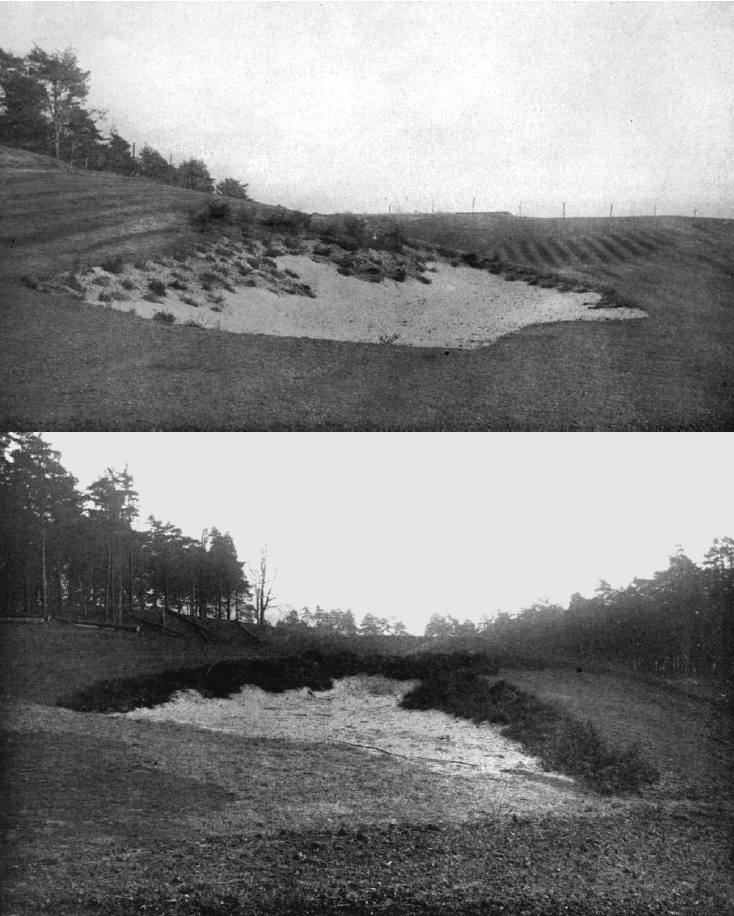
Two Bunkers by H. S. Colt, representing the then-new natural style, 1914

Henry Shapland Colt (4 August 1869 – 21 November 1951) was a British golf course architect born in Highgate, England, the sixth child and younger son of a barrister. He worked predominantly with Charles Alison, John Morrison, and Alister MacKenzie, in 1928 forming Colt, Alison & Morrison Ltd. He participated in the design or redesign of over 300 golf courses (115 on his own) in all six inhabited continents, including those at Wentworth Club, Sunningdale, Muirfield, Royal Portrush, and Royal Liverpool.

Colt teamed up with George Crump in 1918 to design the course at Pine Valley Golf Club, which has been ranked almost continuously since 1985 as the #1 golf course in the United States, by Golf magazine (1985–2000, 2003–2008, 2013–2014, 2017-2025 ranking of the Top 100 Courses in the U.S.) and Golf Digest (1985–2000, 2003–2008, 2013–2014, 2017-2025 ranking of America's 100 Greatest Golf Courses). The classic Plum Hollow Country Club in Southfield, Michigan, was designed by Colt and Alison in 1921. The course played host to the 1947 PGA Championship, the 1957 Western Open, and Ryder Cup Challenge Matches in 1943. On a tour of North America before the First World War, Colt also laid out the course at the Old Elm Club in Highland Park, Illinois, leaving plans and instructions for Donald Ross to build it.

Colt was educated at Monkton Combe School near Bath between 1881 and 1887, before taking a law degree at Clare College, Cambridge, where he captained the Cambridge University Golf Club in 1890.

In 1897 he became a founder member of the Royal & Ancient Rules of Golf Committee.

== Career ==
Colt's courses of note in the UK include: Stoke Poges Golf Club, Tandridge Golf Club, which features Colt Corner, Oxford Golf Club, Ladbrook Park Golf Club, Denham Golf Club, St George's Hill, Sunningdale (New course), Belfairs Golf Club, Rye, Blackmoor, Swinley Forest, Brancepeth Castle, Peebles Golf Club, Brokenhurst Manor, Camberley Heath, Calcot Park, Goring and Streatley Golf Club, Alnmouth Golf Club (Foxton), Grimsby Golf Club, Hendon Golf Club, Tyneside and the East & West Courses at Wentworth Club. He performed extensive revisions of Sunningdale (Old course), Woodhall Spa, Muirfield and Royal Liverpool Golf Club, Hoylake.

In Ireland Colt & Co. were responsible for new courses at Royal Portrush, Royal Belfast, Co. Sligo and Belvoir Park in Belfast. Extensive revisions were also carried out at Royal County Down and Dollymount. Colt & Company were also active in Continental Europe, throughout Northern France, The Netherlands and Germany.

In Canada, his courses for the Hamilton Golf and Country Club and the Toronto Golf Club are highly respected. He also designed in 1914 the first Spanish course bigger than 4.300 yards, the Club de Golf Sant Cugat, promoted by the Barcelona Traction Light and Power Company Ltd.

== Results in major championships ==
Note: Colt played in only The Open Championship and The Amateur Championship.

Tournament	1891	1892	1893	1894	1895	1896	1897	1898	1899
The Open Championship	T38	DNP	DNP	DNP	DNP	DNP	DNP	DNP	DNP
The Amateur Championship	DNP	DNP	DNP	DNP	R64	R32	R32	R64	R32

Tournament	1900	1901	1902	1903	1904	1905	1906	1907	1908	1909
The Amateur Championship	R32	QF	R64	DNP	R64	DNP	SF	R128	QF	R128

Tournament	1910	1911	1912
The Amateur Championship	R32	QF	R32

DNP = Did not play
"T" indicates a tie for a place
R128, R64, R32, R16, QF, SF = Round in which player lost in match play
Yellow background for top-10

== Team appearances ==
- England–Scotland Amateur Match (representing England): 1908
