= Tom Doak =

American golf course designer

Tom Doak is an American golf course architect. He has 6 courses ranked among the top 100 in the world according to the "Top 100 Courses in the World" March 2021 list compiled by Golf Magazine. These include Pacific Dunes in Oregon, Ballyneal in Colorado, Barnbougle Dunes in Tasmania and Cape Kidnappers in New Zealand. Doak lives in Michigan.

He was a student of golf course designer Pete Dye, although perhaps his greatest influence comes from Alister MacKenzie (about whom Doak wrote a book), designer of Cypress Point, Royal Melbourne, and consultant to Bobby Jones at Augusta National. In 2007, Doak restored Alister MacKenzie's home course, Pasatiempo, a Golf Magazine Top 100 course located in Santa Cruz, California.

Doak is the author of The Confidential Guide to Golf Courses which is a guide to famous and obscure golf courses around the world. The original version of the book was intended for a select group of friends and golf course architects. The sanitized version became a coffee table book which also included Doak's photography. Despite being toned down, the book includes several extremely critical reviews of golf courses and alienated several well-regarded golf course architects. For example, in his entry for Talamore Golf Club in Pinehurst, North Carolina, designed by Rees Jones, Doak wrote that the "dull layout" made him "want to spit", while he gave the David McLay Kidd-designed St Andrews Links Castle Course a 0.

== Education ==
Doak attended Cornell University after a semester at MIT where he studied Design and Landscape Architecture. After graduating Cornell, he won the Dreer Award from the Department of Floriculture and Horticulture. He used the Dreer Award to travel to Great Britain and Ireland, between 1982 and 1983, to study their best golf courses. He caddied at St. Andrews during the summer of 1982.

== Career ==
Doak is a "minimalist" designer. Minimalism is a school of golf design that focuses on concentrating the design of a golf hole (or routing) around the natural features of the land. His most successful courses have been built on sand dunes, taking advantage of the sandy soil for drainage and also allowing for the reuse of native elements.

Doak's first course, High Pointe Golf Club near Williamsburg, Michigan, opened in 1989. The course closed in 2008 and is expected to reopen in 2024.

Doak credits most of his accomplishments and success to golf course designer Pete Dye. Doak worked with Dye to learn how to construct golf courses during graduate school. Doak was exposed to several different schools of design on multiple continents in a variety of conditions. Jim Urbina taught him how to run a bulldozer allowing Doak to think in three dimensions and how to use the materials around him.

In 2015 he announced he would spend a significant amount of time during the ensuing few years, researching for a new edition of his book, The Confidential Guide to Golf Courses.

His admiration of the Charles Blair Macdonald designed Lido Golf Club in Hempstead, NY led him to design a replica in Sand Valley, WI that reached 48 in the "Top 100 Courses in the World" November 2025 list compiled by Golf Magazine.

== Books ==
Doak has written seven books, mostly about Golf Course Design:

- The Anatomy of a Golf Course Independent Book Publisher | Publish | Book Publisher ISBN 978-1-58080-071-6 (1992).
- The Confidential Guide to Golf Courses ISBN 978-1-886947-09-2 (1996)
- The Life and Work of Dr. Alister MacKenzie New Pop Music, Pop Music Videos, Pop News - Clock Tower ISBN 978-1-58536-018-5 (2001) by Tom Doak, James S. Scott, Raymund M. Haddock, Ray Haddock, and James Scott
- Tom Doak's Little Red Book of Golf Course Architecture (2017)
- Getting to 18 (2020)
- The Making of Pacific Dunes (2021)
- Getting to 18: Volume 2 (2022)

== Courses ==
=== Public and resort courses ===
- Aetna Springs Golf Club; Pope Valley, CA; Closed
- Apache Stronghold Golf Club; Globe, AZ; Closed
- Atlantic City Country Club; Northfield, NJ
- Barnbougle Dunes Golf Links; Bridport, Tasmania, Australia
- Beechtree Golf Club; Aberdeen, MD; Closed
- Black Forest at Wilderness Valley; Gaylord, MI Closed
- Cabot Highlands, Scotland (Future)
- Cape Kidnappers Resort; Napier New Zealand
- Charlotte Golf Links; Charlotte, North Carolina; Closed
- CommonGround Golf Course; Aurora, Colorado
- High Pointe Golf Club; Williamsburg, MI
- Memorial Park Golf Course; Houston, TX
- Old Macdonald, one of the courses at Bandon Dunes Golf Resort; Bandon, Oregon
- Pacific Dunes, one of the courses at Bandon Dunes Golf Resort; Bandon, Oregon
- Pasatiempo Golf Club (restoration); Santa Cruz, CA
- Pinehurst No.10, Aberdeen, NC
- Quail Crossing Golf Club; Evansville, IN
- Riverfront Golf Club; Suffolk, Virginia
- Sedge Valley; Nekoosa, WI
- St Patrick's Links at Rosapenna Golf Resort, Ireland
- Streamsong Golf Course Blue; Central FL
- The Golf Club at St. Andrew's Beach; Rye, Victoria, Australia
- The Legends Golf Club; Heathlands Course; Myrtle Beach, SC
- The Loop at Forest Dunes, Roscommon, MI (Reversible 18 hole golf course)
- The Rawls Course at Texas Tech University; Lubbock, TX

=== Private courses ===
- Ballyneal; Holyoke, CO
- Dismal River; The Red Course; Mullen, NE
- Grand Saint-Emilionnais Golf Club; Gardegan et Tourtirac, France
- High Pointe Golf Club; Williamsburg, MI
- Lido; Nekoosa, WI
- Lost Dunes Golf Club; Bridgman, MI
- Rock Creek Cattle Company; Deer Lodge, MT
- Sebonack Golf Club; Southampton, New York (with Jack Nicklaus)
- Stone Eagle Golf Club; Palm Desert, CA
- Stonewall; North Course; Elverson, Pennsylvania
- Stonewall; Old Course; Elverson, Pennsylvania
- Tara Iti; New Zealand
- Te Arai North; New Zealand
- The Renaissance Club; Lothians, Scotland
- The Village Club; Sands Point, New York
- Tumble Creek at Suncadia; Cle Elum, WA

=== Golf Course (Restoration/Renovation) ===
- Bel-Air Country Club, Los Angeles, California
- Camargo, Ohio
- Commonwealth, Victoria, Australia
- Dornick Hills, Oklahoma
- Crooked Stick Golf Club, Carmel, Indiana
- Country Club of Detroit, Grosse Pointe Farms, Michigan
- East Potomac, Washington D.C. (Future)
- Onwentsia Club, Lake Forest, Illinois
- Pasatiempo, California
- San Francisco Golf Club, California
- Valley Club of Montecito, California
- Washington Golf & Country Club, Arlington, Virginia
- Woodhall Spa, Hotchkin Course, Lincolnshire, England
- Yarra Yarra, Melbourne
- Gunnamatta, The National Golf Club, Victoria, Australia
