= David McLay Kidd =

Scottish golf course designer

David McLay Kidd is a Scottish golf course architect. He has 1 course, Bandon Dunes, ranked among the top 100 in the world according to the "Top 100 Courses in the World" November 2025 list compiled by Golf Magazine. Other notable designs include Gamble Sands, Mammoth Dunes, and Tetherow. He lives in Bend, Oregon.

== Early life and education ==
McLay Kidd was born in 1967, in Johnstone, Renfrewshire, in Scotland. His father, Jimmy Kidd, was a greenkeeper. At Writtle College he studied Horticulture and Landscape Design, the closest discipline he could find to golf design, and he interned with Southern Golf Construction.

== Career ==
Kidd worked at Swan Golf Designs and as Director of Design at Gleneagles Golf Developments.

In 1994 he was hired by Mike Keiser to design the first course at Bandon Dunes Golf Resort. Kidd wrote that "My task was to create the first genuine Scottish-style links course in America, and I believe there are few places outside the sand dunes along the Oregon coast where this would be possible." The course opened in May 1999.

In the following years, in some of Kidd's designs, the "whole resistance to scoring, and defense of par, and all of this kind of stuff starts to play into the mix." Among such designs were the St Andrews Links Castle Course, and Tetherow in Oregon.

Following a 2009 visit back to Bandon, in his subsequent work Kidd shifted toward playability and fun for the average golfer. Courses such as Mammoth Dunes and Gamble Sands, with wide fairways, large greens, and fewer opportunities to lose golf balls, reflect this change. "Playability and challenge are not the scales of justice," Kidd says. "They are not connected. You can create an extremely playable golf course that is still very challenging."

In 2025, Loralama represented Kidd's attempt to bring Links golf to Texas.

Kidd's design firm is DMK Golf Design.

== Courses ==
- Bandon Dunes, Bandon, OR
- Beaverbrook, England
- Entrada at Snow Canyon, UT
- Fancourt - Montagu, South Africa
- Gamble Sands - Sands Course, WA
- Gamble Sands - Scarecrow, WA
- Gokarna Forest, Nepal
- Graybull, NE
- Guacalito De La Isla, Nicaragua
- Laucala Island, Fiji
- Loraloma Golf Club
- Machrihanish Dunes, Scotland
- Mammoth Dunes - Sand Valley Golf Resort, WI
- Nanea, HI
- Powerscourt - West Course, Ireland
- Queenwood, England
- Rancho Santa Fe Golf Club, CA
- River Ranch, WA
- Rolling Hills Country Club, CA
- St. Andrews Links - The Castle Course, Scotland
- Sand Point Country Club, WA
- Tetherow, OR
- TPC Stonebrae, CA
- Tributary, ID
