= Colt, Alison & Morrison Ltd =

British golf course architecture firm

Colt, Alison & Morrison Ltd was a British golf course architecture firm founded in 1928. The partners Harry Colt, Charles Hugh Alison, and John Stanton Fleming Morrison jointly or severally designed over 300 courses on all of the continents with the exception of Antarctica.
