= Bandon Dunes Golf Resort =

Golf resort in Oregon, United States

- Location in the United States Location in Oregon
- 43.188°N 124.39°W

Club information
- Location: Coos County, Oregon, U.S., near Bandon
- Established: May 19, 1999; 27 years ago
- Owner: Mike Keiser
- Total holes: 140; 90 regular holes 32 par-3 holes 18 putting holes
- Website: bandondunesgolf.com

Bandon Dunes
- Designed by: David McLay Kidd
- Par: 72
- Length: 7,212 yards (6,595 m)
- Course rating: 76.8
- Slope rating: 150

Pacific Dunes
- Designed by: Tom Doak
- Par: 71
- Length: 6,633 yards (6,065 m)
- Course rating: 73.2
- Slope rating: 143

Bandon Trails
- Designed by: Bill Coore, Ben Crenshaw
- Par: 71
- Length: 6,788 yards (6,207 m)
- Course rating: 73.6
- Slope rating: 130

Old Macdonald
- Designed by: Tom Doak, Jim Urbina
- Par: 71
- Length: 6,944 yards (6,350 m)
- Course rating: 74.4
- Slope rating: 131

Sheep Ranch
- Designed by: Bill Coore, Ben Crenshaw
- Par: 72
- Length: 6,636 yards (6,068 m)
- Course rating: 72.1
- Slope rating: 122

Bandon Dunes Golf Resort is a complex of five links and two par-3 golf courses on the West Coast of the United States, located alongside the Pacific Ocean in southwest Oregon, just north of the city of Bandon.

== Courses ==
The first course at the resort, Bandon Dunes, opened on May 19, 1999. Bandon Dunes was designed by Scotsman David McLay Kidd, and it instantly garnered high praise. The course was one of Kidd's early efforts at designing a golf course. Since opening, the original golf course on the property has been adjusted. Alterations include significant amounts of gorse removal and a rerouting of the par-3, second hole. Bandon Dunes is traditionally home to resort guests' lowest scores, thanks to its forgiving landing areas off the tee and mildly to moderately undulating green complexes.

The resort's second course, Pacific Dunes, opened on July 1, 2001. Pacific Dunes was designed by Michigan architect Tom Doak, and sculpted by his design firm, Renaissance Design, Inc. Pacific Dunes also opened to glowing reviews and quickly surpassed Bandon Dunes as the highest-rated course on the property. Pacific Dunes was rated the number one resort golf course in the country in 2005 by Golfweek magazine, placing just ahead of Pebble Beach. It was ranked 8th in the best links courses ranking by Golf Magazine in 2014.

The resort's third course, Bandon Trails, was designed by the team of Bill Coore and Ben Crenshaw. Bandon Trails opened on June 1, 2005. Bandon Trails differs from its siblings in that no holes are routed along the Pacific Ocean. The course meanders through dunes, meadows, and forest land. Upon its opening, Golf Odyssey, the preeminent newsletter devoted to golf travel, named Bandon Dunes, The Best Place on the Planet for Golf.

The fourth course, Old Macdonald (in honor of Charles Blair Macdonald), was designed by a team led by Tom Doak and Jim Urbina. It opened in June 2010.

The fifth course, Bandon Preserve, is a Par-3 short course There are 13 holes on the course. It was also designed by Coore and Crenshaw, and the course opened on May 1, 2012.

A more recent addition to the Bandon Dunes family, The Punchbowl, is a 100,000-square-foot (9,300 m^{2}) putting course designed by Doak and Urbina. It opened in 2014 and is adjacent to the first tee at Pacific Dunes. It has 18 holes and takes about an hour to play. The area is a collection of natural hollows. Punchbowl is a longstanding design concept by golf architects. The 18th hole at Old Macdonald shares the same principles and is aptly named "Punchbowl."

The sixth course, Sheep Ranch, opened on June 1, 2020. Located to the north of Old Macdonald, it has a mile of ocean frontage over a series of promontories, with several holes featuring shots over water and cliffs. The property had been a wind farm in the 1970s, but had been abandoned because the winds proved to be too intense for turbines of that era. Resort owner Mike Keiser bought the land in 2000 along with business partner Phil Friedmann, and originally intended for it to be a private course separate from the main resort. Doak and Urbina started work on the property after completing Pacific Dunes, and had completed 13 greens before Keiser and Friedmann stopped construction once locals heard about the project, fearing that the project would cause problems for the resort. For more than 15 years, the property sat largely vacant; the greens were not irrigated, and only a select number of resort guests who asked the right individuals were allowed on the incomplete course. Eventually, Keiser and Friedmann decided to incorporate this land into the resort, and enlisted Coore and Crenshaw to design a full course. Three pairs of holes that travel in different directions share teeing areas.

The seventh and the newest course, called Shorty's, opened on May 2, 2024. It is a 19-Hole Par 3. Designed by Whitman, Axland and Cutten, the golf course boasts fantastic views. It is named after Shorty Dow, the previous owner of the land and Mike Keiser's good friend.

The use of golf carts is not permitted at the resort, unless required for medical reasons.

In 2009, Golf Magazine named the three courses existing at that time to its list of the 50 best courses built in the last 50 years. Pacific Dunes ranked second, Bandon Dunes twelfth, and Bandon Trails thirty-third. In 2013, Golf Digest ranked Bandon Dunes (Old MacDonald) fifth in its list of the Top 50 Golf Courses for Women.

The resort is widely known as a top destination for golf trips.

== Tournaments held ==
The United States Golf Association has staged nine amateur championship tournaments at Bandon Dunes Golf Resort, the most recent being the 2025 U.S. Women's Amateur.

The USGA first came to Bandon Dunes in 2006, staging the Curtis Cup, a biennial women's amateur team competition between the United States and Great Britain/Ireland. The matches took place on the Pacific Dunes course, and the U.S. won 11½ to 6½.

The next year, 2007, saw the resort host the U.S. Mid-Amateur Golf Championship. Bandon Dunes was the primary course for the event, with Bandon Trails used as the second course for the stroke-play portion of the event.

Bandon Dunes hosted the 2011 U.S. Amateur Public Links and the U.S. Women's Amateur Public Links championship tournaments. It was the first time the USGA held the men's and women's Public Links events jointly. The tournaments were played on the Old Macdonald and Bandon Trails courses.

In 2015, the resort hosted the first U.S. Women's Amateur Four-Ball, an event the USGA created to replace the Public Links, which was discontinued. The event was held on the Pacific Dunes course.

Bandon Dunes was also the site of the 2019 U.S. Amateur Four-Ball. Old Macdonald's was the primary course used for the event, with Pacific Dunes also used.

In 2020, the resort hosted the U.S. Amateur for the first time. Bandon Dunes was the primary course, with Bandon Trails used as the second course for the stroke-play portion of the event. Tyler Strafaci won the tournament, defeating Ollie Osborne in the final match, during which the contestants played through thick fog during the final holes.

In 2021, the USGA announced that 12 additional championships would be held at the course through 2045 including the 2025 U.S. Women's Amateur, and 2029 Walker Cup.

In 2022, the resort hosted the U.S. Junior Amateur for the first time. Bandon Dunes was the primary course, with Bandon Trails used as the second course for the stroke-play portion of the event.

In 2025, the resort hosted the U.S. Women's Amateur for the first time, held at Bandon Dunes course.

Starting in 2010, the resort has hosted an annual Division I collegiate tournament in March called the Bandon Dunes Championship. The tournament draws elite college teams from across the country with past champions including Duke, Clemson, Notre Dame, Oregon, and Missouri. The resort partnered with Gonzaga University as the host school for the first 11 years of the tournament, but since 2021, the University of Idaho has acted as the host school. The 2024 championship was to be played on March 10-12 on Pacific Dunes, but was canceled due to inclement weather.

== Scorecards ==
Bandon Dunes
Tee	Rating/Slope	1	2	3	4	5	6	7	8	9	Out	10	11	12	13	14	15	16	17	18	In	Total
Tournament	76.8 / 150	398	220	563	443	445	217	411	385	585	3667	380	452	238	553	390	206	363	405	558	3545	7212
Black	74.1 / 143	386	189	543	410	428	161	383	359	558	3417	362	384	199	553	359	163	363	389	543	3315	6732
Green	71.4 / 133	352	155	489	362	400	153	372	342	520	3145	339	351	153	537	332	131	345	375	513	3076	6221
Gold	69.5 / 133	332	136	467	340	374	126	332	321	510	2938	302	315	129	498	320	113	301	329	471	2778	5716
SI	Men's	13	15	3	5	1	17	7	11	9		8	2	18	6	16	14	10	12	4
Par		4	3	5	4	4	3	4	4	5	36	4	4	3	5	4	3	4	4	5	36	72
Orange	72.4 / 128	293	130	370	308	321	111	317	290	464	2604	251	284	98	447	288	102	250	324	424	2468	5072
SI	Women's	9	13	1	17	7	15	5	11	3		10	12	18	6	14	16	4	8	2

Pacific Dunes
Tee	Rating/Slope	1	2	3	4	5	6	7	8	9	Out	10	11	12	13	14	15	16	17	18	In	Total
Black	73.0 / 142	370	368	499	463	199	316	464	400	406	3485	206	148	529	444	145	539	338	208	591	3148	6633
Green	70.7 / 133	304	335	476	449	181	288	436	369	379	3217	163	131	507	390	128	504	338	189	575	2925	6142
Gold	68.6 / 129	287	335	476	410	163	288	377	349	356	3041	149	114	476	371	119	492	301	164	548	2734	5775
SI	Men's	9	11	7	3	17	13	1	5	15		14	18	6	2	16	10	12	8	4
Par		4	4	5	4	3	4	4	4	4	36	3	3	5	4	3	5	4	3	5	35	71
Orange	69.8 / 128	253	275	452	369	133	267	314	296	268	2627	129	96	449	336	100	452	292	128	479	2461	5088
SI	Women's	9	13	1	3	17	11	7	5	15		14	18	6	4	16	8	10	12	2

Bandon Trails
Tee	Rating/Slope	1	2	3	4	5	6	7	8	9	Out	10	11	12	13	14	15	16	17	18	In	Total
Black	73.6 / 130	392	214	549	408	133	395	440	321	567	3419	418	445	242	401	325	406	530	182	420	3369	6788
Green	71.1 / 129	356	166	532	365	124	359	406	299	522	3129	393	429	235	374	306	367	494	159	363	3120	6249
Gold	68.7 / 122	288	142	513	334	114	315	373	283	497	2859	369	398	220	354	292	323	466	138	332	2892	5751
SI	Men's	13	17	3	5	15	9	7	11	1		10	4	18	12	14	8	2	16	6
Par		4	3	5	4	3	4	4	4	5	36	4	4	3	4	4	4	5	3	4	35	71
Orange	70.8 / 122	212	84	455	315	104	293	351	243	456	2513	326	382	192	308	251	296	437	128	264	2584	5097
SI	Women's	13	17	5	7	15	9	1	11	3		10	4	18	6	14	8	2	16	12

Old Macdonald
Tee	Rating/Slope	1	2	3	4	5	6	7	8	9	Out	10	11	12	13	14	15	16	17	18	In	Total
Black	74.4 / 131	341	181	375	504	160	555	363	181	416	3076	465	445	237	346	370	535	455	546	469	3868	6944
Green	71.6 / 125	304	162	345	472	134	520	345	170	352	2804	440	399	205	319	297	482	433	515	426	3516	6320
Gold	68.0 / 116	275	139	312	441	121	467	322	152	343	2572	383	390	164	253	254	424	408	397	413	3086	5658
SI	Men's	11	15	9	1	17	3	5	13	7		6	4	16	18	14	12	2	10	8
Par		4	3	4	4	3	5	4	3	4	34	4	4	3	4	4	5	4	5	4	37	71
Orange	70.1 / 117	242	106	244	391	100	401	311	130	284	2209	369	344	149	247	238	340	326	391	372	2776	4985
SI	Women's	9	13	7	1	17	3	11	15	5		10	8	16	18	14	4	6	2	12

Sheep Ranch
Tee	Rating/Slope	1	2	3	4	5	6	7	8	9	Out	10	11	12	13	14	15	16	17	18	In	Total
Black	72.1 / 122	549	318	120	474	198	460	155	429	399	3102	390	529	440	510	403	321	151	326	464	3534	6636
Green	70.2 / 119	517	303	113	443	166	431	138	407	386	2904	375	506	414	485	377	303	131	314	436	3341	6245
Gold	68.1 / 111	491	282	101	415	139	401	110	382	361	2682	356	463	390	464	354	279	120	297	405	3128	5810
SI		5	13	17	3	11	1	15	7	9		6	4	2	10	8	14	16	12	18
Par		5	4	3	4	3	4	3	4	4	34	4	5	4	5	4	4	3	4	5	38	72
Orange	65.2 / 105	422	263	94	379	130	318	99	337	339	2381	316	411	318	377	325	260	102	266	388	2763	5144

== Restaurants ==
Bandon Dunes Golf Resort is home to 10 different on-site dining options with varying offerings and availability in addition to in-room dining services.

- Ghost Tree Grill—a Pacific Northwest inspired steakhouse and raw bar named after the fabled Ghost Tree on Old Mcdonald's third hole
- The Gallery & Puffin Bar—Offers Italian classics, located at the main lodge
- Pacific Grill—Seafood-focused Menu, located above the Pacific Dunes pro shop
- McKee's Pub—Traditional Pub Fare, located next to main lodge
- Trails End—Seasonal offerings with a focus on Pacific Rim cuisine, located next to Bandon Trails pro shop
- Charlotte's—BBQ Cuisine, located at practice facility
- The Bunker Bar—Late-night bar with limited dining menu, near the main lodge
- The Library Lounge—Cocktail Bar with South Coast cuisine, connected to lobby of the Inn
- Sheep Ranch Clubhouse—quick-serve restaurant, located at Sheep Ranch golf course
- Shorty's Clubhouse—quick-serve, Mexican street fare, located at Shorty's clubhouse

== Gallery ==
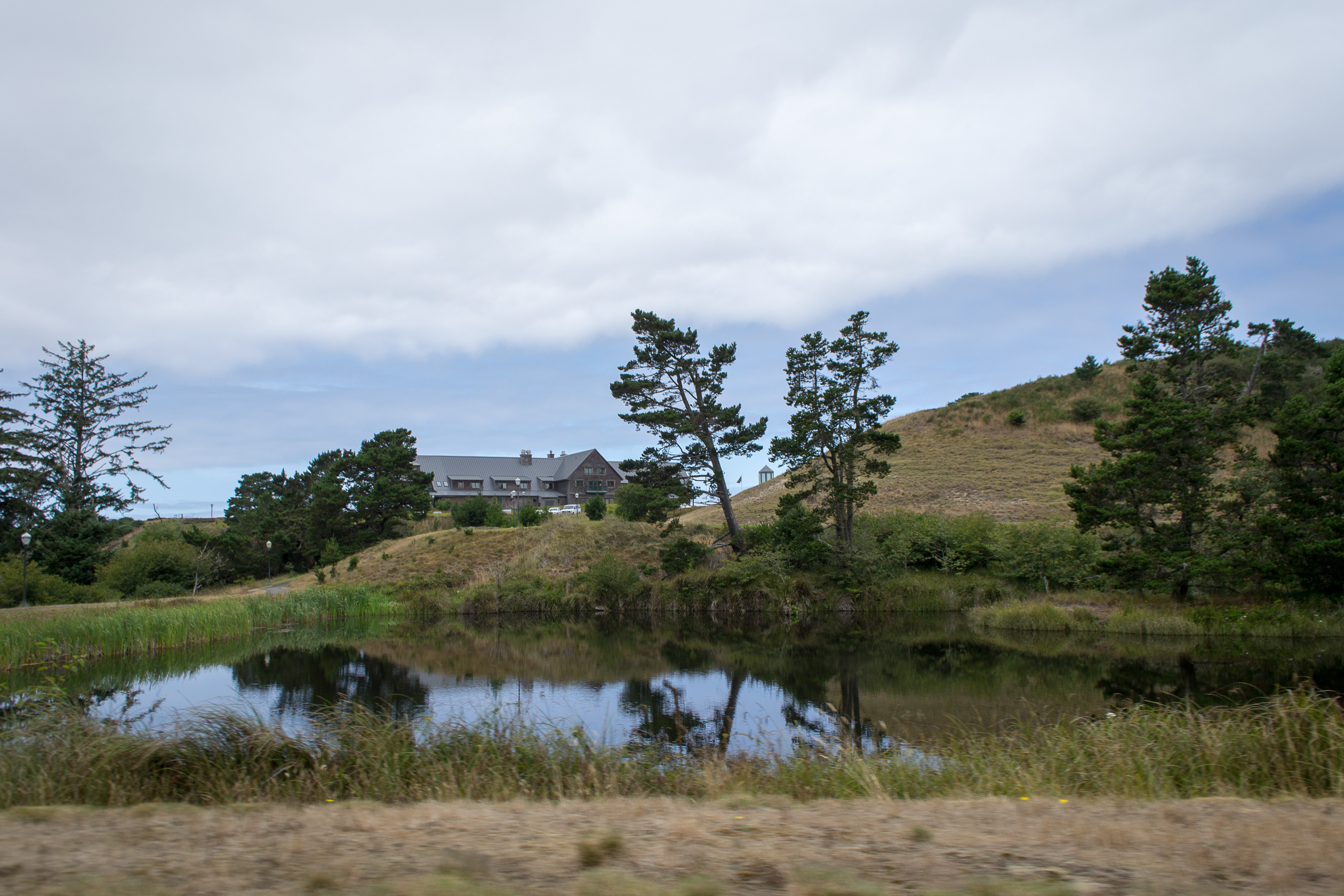

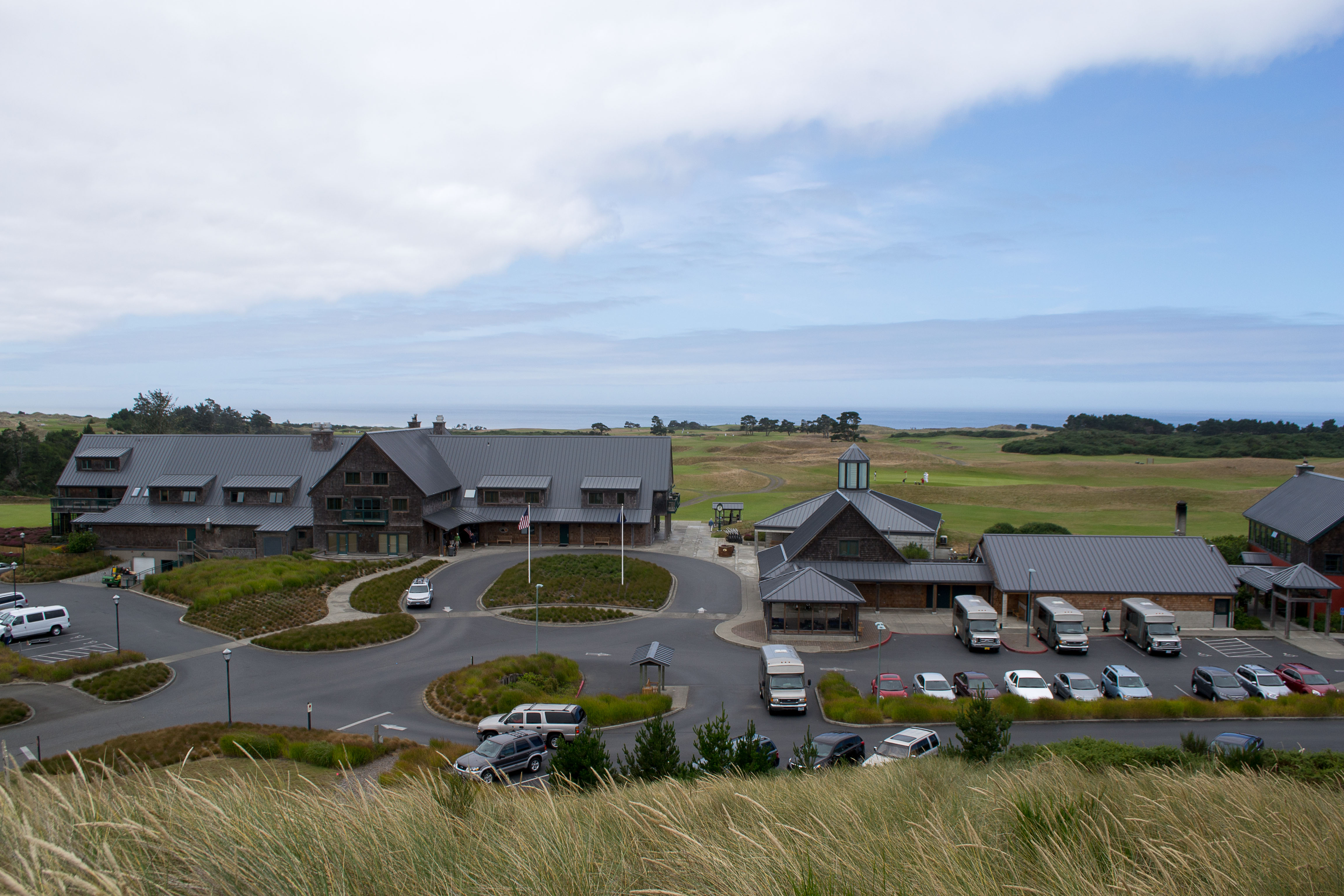

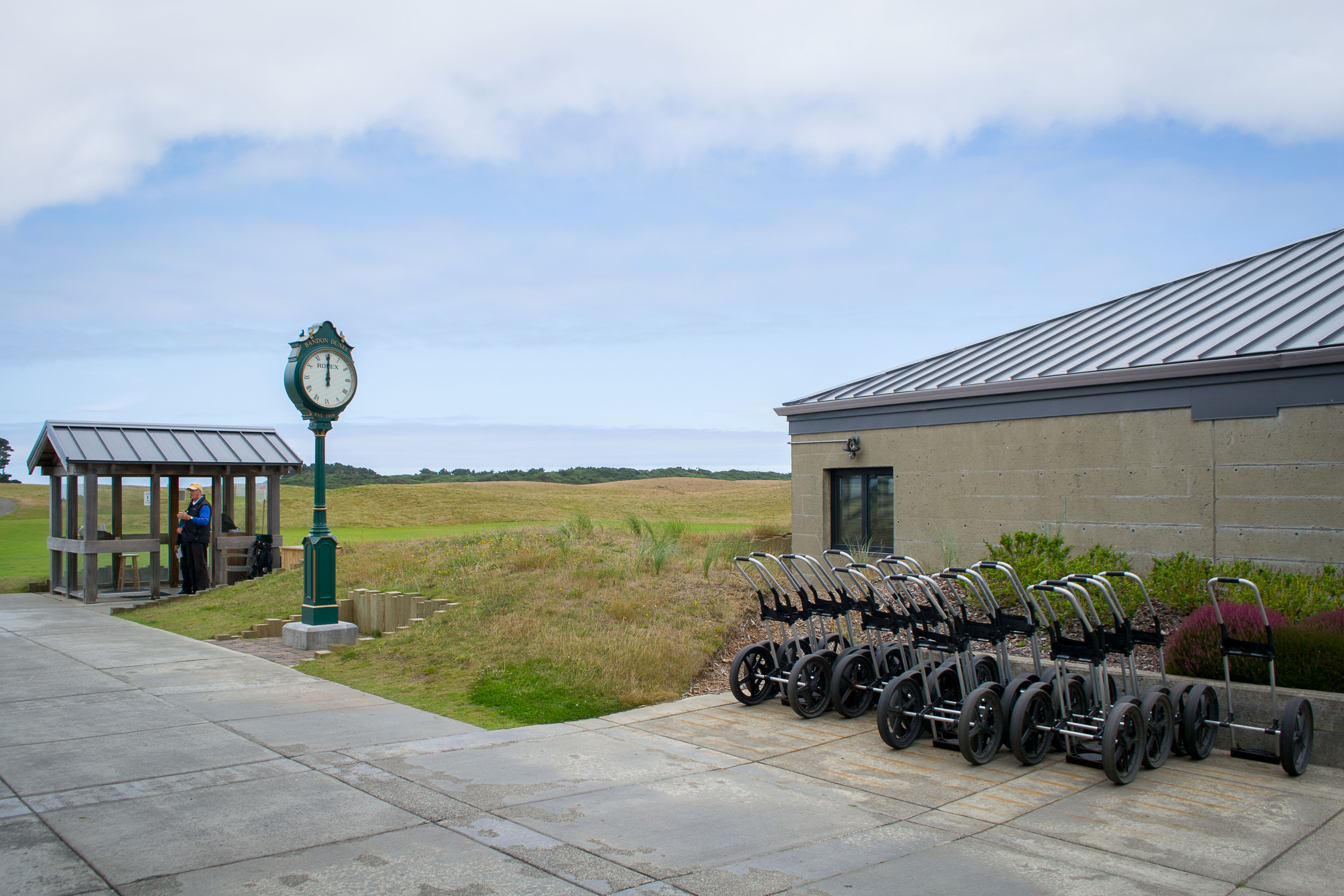

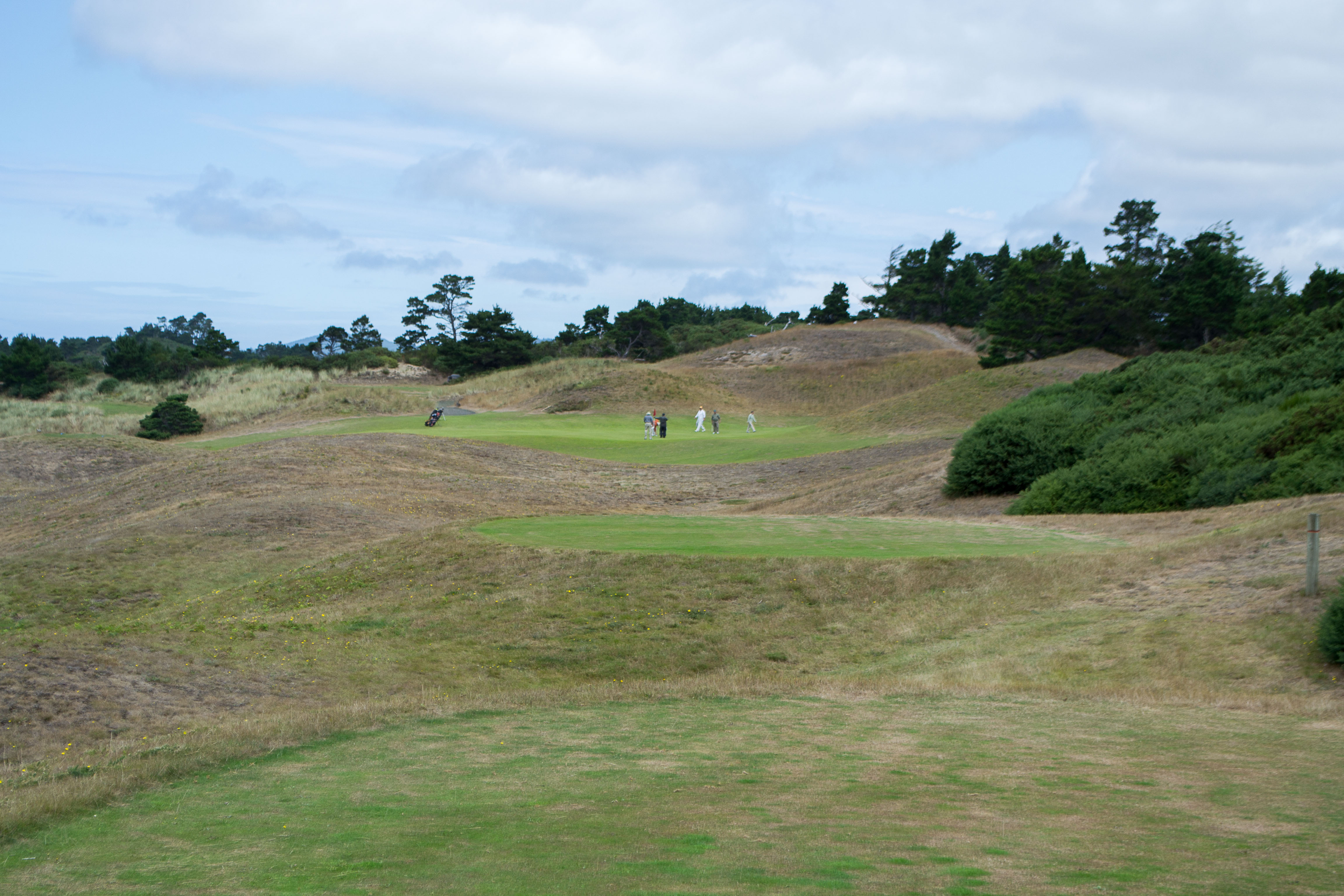

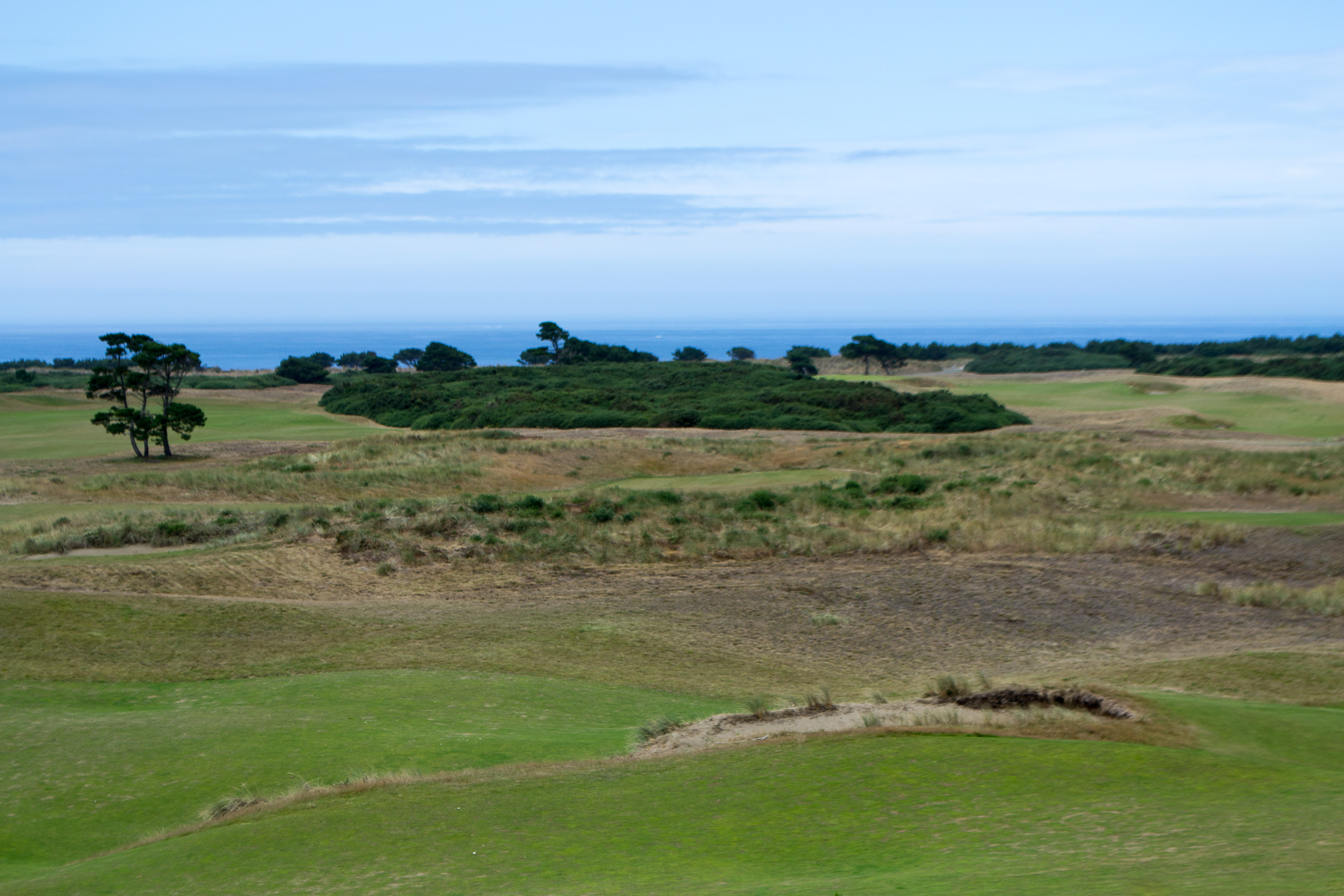

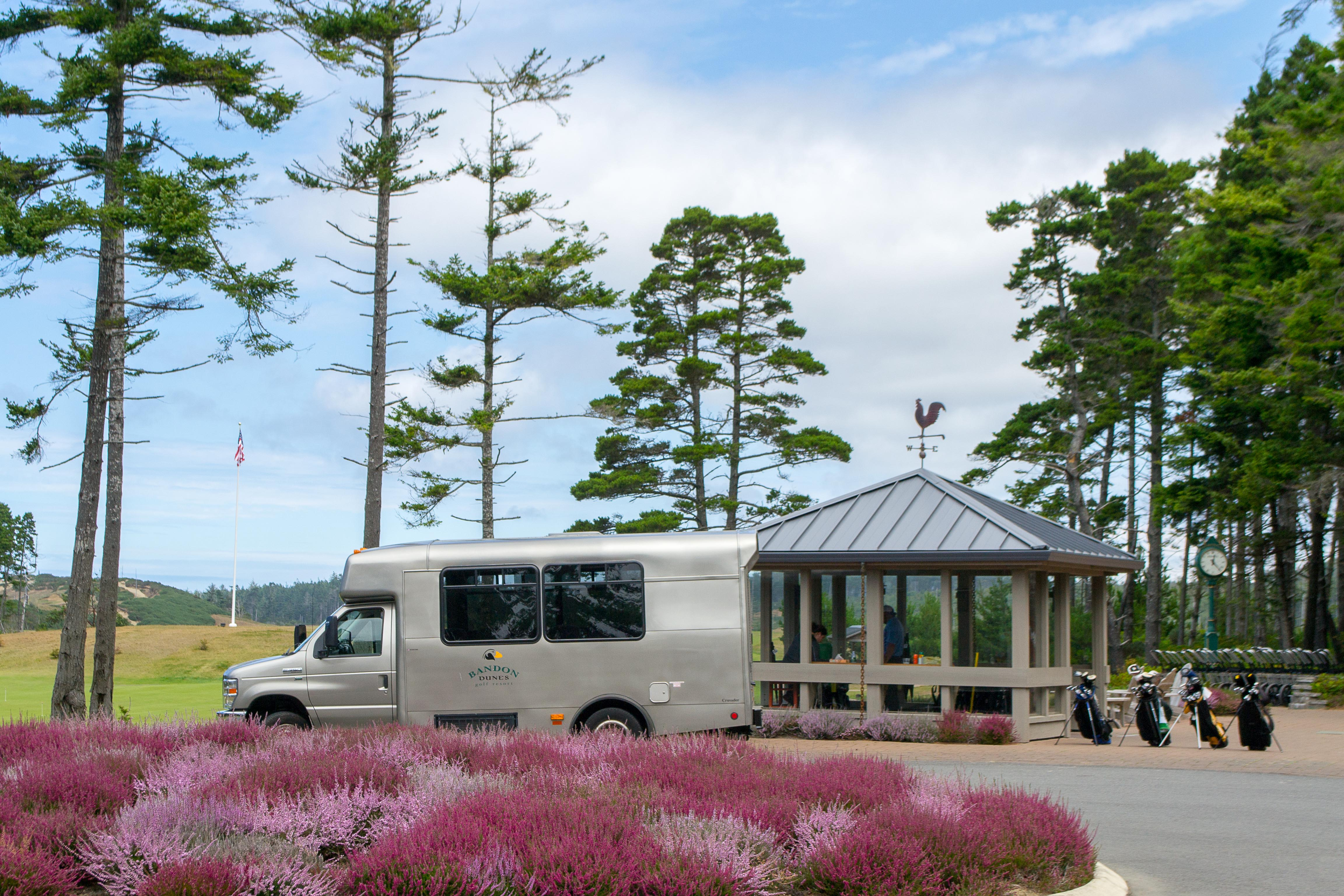

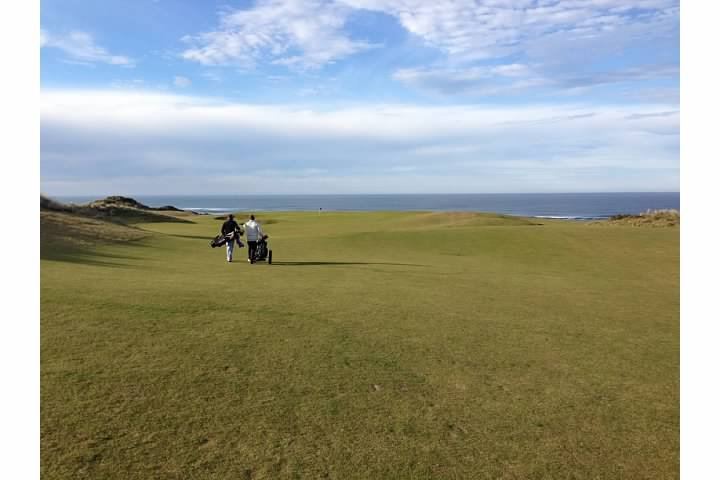

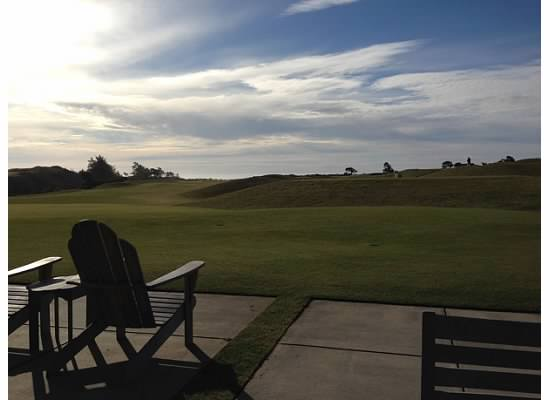

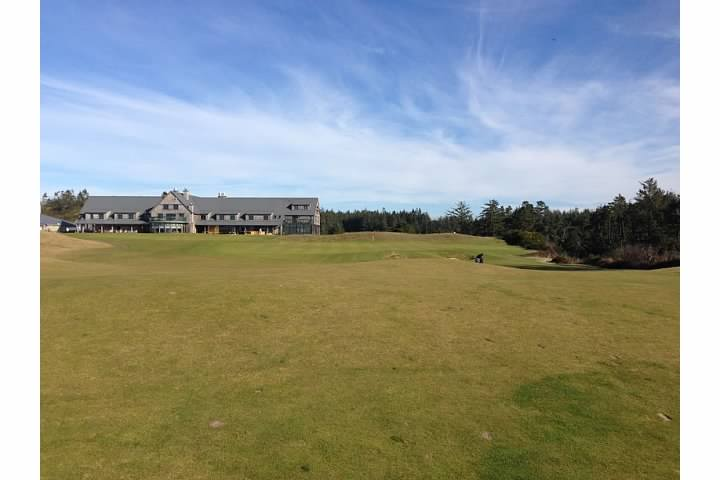

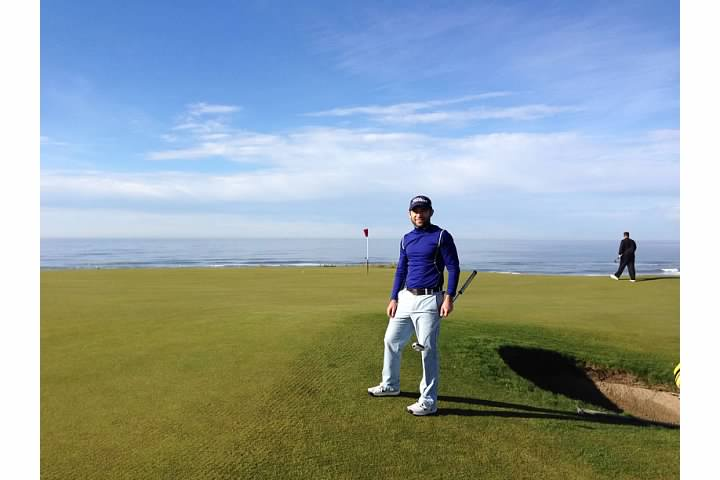

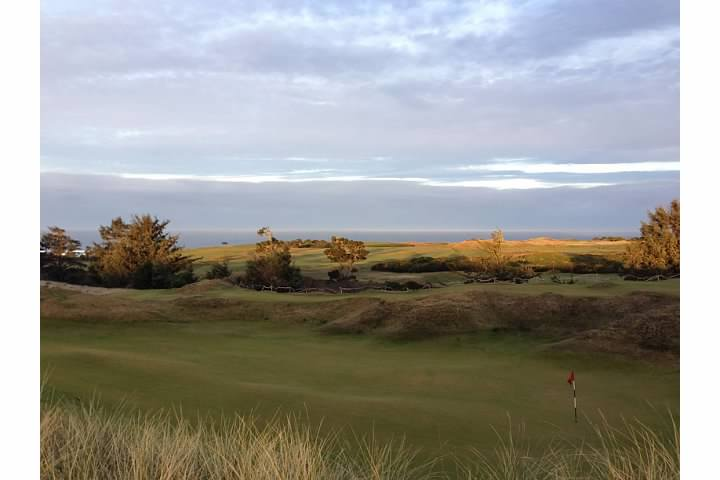

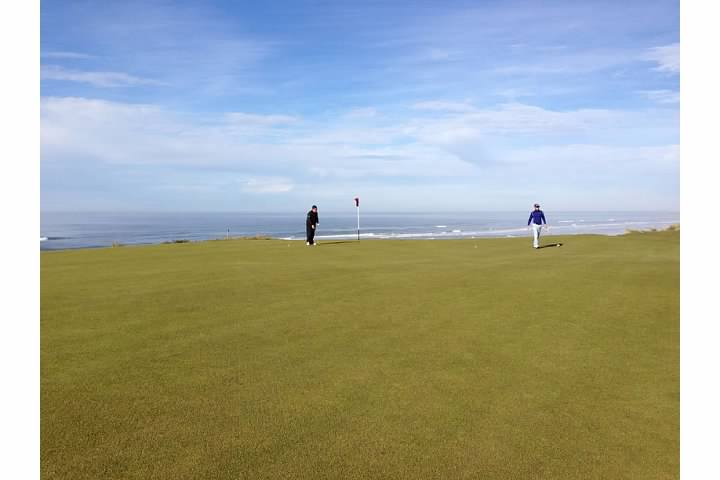

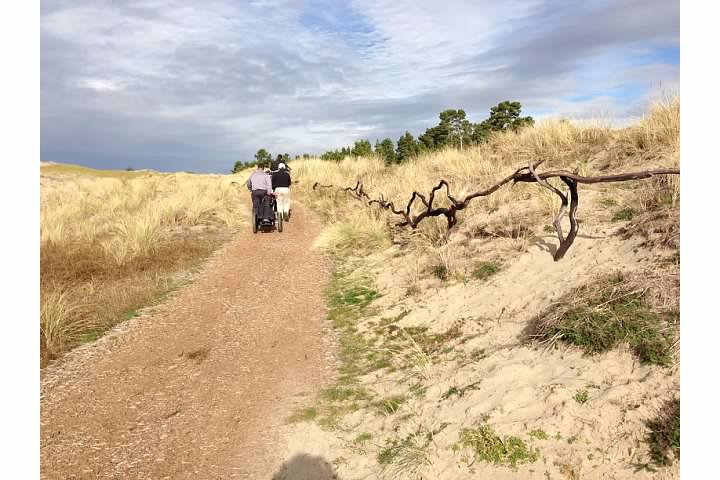
