= Evans Scholars Foundation =

American nonprofit organization

- Founded: 1930
- Founder: Chick Evans
- Location: Glenview, Illinois, U.S.
- Region served: United States
- Website: www.wgaesf.org

The Evans Scholars Foundation is a nonprofit organization based in Glenview, Illinois that provides full tuition and housing college scholarships to golf caddies. Operated by the Western Golf Association, the Evans Scholars Foundation has helped more than 11,550 caddies graduate from college since its creation in 1930.

The Foundation was founded with money earned and donated by famed amateur golfer Charles "Chick" Evans.

== History ==
In 1916, Evans rose to fame by becoming the first amateur golfer to win the Western Amateur, Western Open, U.S. Amateur, and U.S. Open. As a result of those wins and other victories, Evans was given several thousand dollars in royalties for recording golf instructions for the Brunswick Record Company. In addition, he received royalties from a golf book written in 1921. If he accepted this money, he would have lost his amateur status. Evans' mother suggested he put the money to good use by sponsoring a scholarship fund for caddies. Evans himself was unable to finish his schooling at Northwestern University. Evans said his mother "wouldn't think of accepting my money unless we could arrange it to be trusted to furnish educations for deserving, qualified caddies." He also said his mother "pointed out that the money came from golf and thus should go back into golf. It was all her dream — her idea."

Evans went to the Western Golf Association, an organization that conducted national golf championships, to get their support for his scholarship. The WGA initially declined Evans' request, stating that it was a golf organization interested only in running championships, most notably the Western Open. In 1929, Evans successfully lobbied the WGA to manage the scholarship on his behalf with the help of his longtime friend and prominent Chicago tax attorney, Carleton Blunt. In 1930, Evans' and his mother's dream became a reality when two caddies, Harold Fink and Jim McGinnis, were named the first two recipients of the Evans Scholarship. They enrolled at Northwestern, the same university where Evans himself had once been a student. Until World War II, all Evans Scholars attended Northwestern, and, in 1940, the first Evans Scholarship House was established on the Evanston campus.

== Program expansion ==
After Evans' initial investment in the Foundation had run out, Blunt, an avid golfer and philanthropist, agreed to continue to help raise money to send more caddies to college. The organization didn't seek outside funding until 1949, relying solely on the generosity of the Western Golf Association's Directors.

To help grow the program as Blunt raised additional funds for scholarship, the Western Golf Association hired Roland F. “Mac” McGuigan, Dean of Men at Northwestern and Faculty Advisor to the Northwestern Chapter of Evans Scholars, in 1949 to serve as its Educational Director.

Following World War II, the program grew dramatically. In 1950, the Foundation sent just 84 caddies to college. By the end of the decade, the number of Scholars enrolled in college increased to 440 and a number of other Scholarship Houses had been established across the country.

As the number of scholarships grew so did the organization's presence on a number of college campus, mainly those in the Midwest. In total, there are 17 Scholarship Houses. In order of their founding, Evans Scholarship Houses can be found at: Northwestern University, University of Illinois at Urbana-Champaign, University of Michigan, University of Wisconsin–Madison, Michigan State University, Marquette University, University of Minnesota, Ohio State University, Purdue University, University of Colorado Boulder, University of Missouri, Indiana University Bloomington, Miami University, University of Oregon, University of Kansas, University of Washington and Penn State University.

In 2013, The Evans Scholars Foundation sent Scholars to the University of Notre Dame. Their enrollment marked the first time the program has sent its caddies to the private university in South Bend, Indiana in nearly 50 years.

In 2020 the Western Golf Association announced they formed a new partnership with the University of Chicago, and would begin awarding at least four new Evans Scholarships per year .

Evans Scholars at the University of Chicago, the University of Illinois-Chicago, the University of Maryland, and the University of Notre Dame live in designated residence halls on their respective campuses.

There are now 1,070 Scholars at 21 universities across the nation. Since its founding, the Evans Scholars Foundation has invested more than $435 million in the college educations of more than 11,300 Alumni.

== Scholarship selection ==
To qualify for an Evans Scholarship, a caddie must meet four key requirements. Candidates must have at least two years of outstanding caddying service. Candidates must have an excellent high school academic record, including high standardized test scores. Candidates must demonstrate significant financial need. Candidates must also receive letters of recommendation from club and high school officials attesting to the applicant's character. Candidates are personally interviewed at one of a series of Selection Meetings, co-hosted by the Western Golf Association and its affiliated country clubs.

== Fundraising ==
Funding for the scholarships provided by the Evans Scholars Foundation comes from a variety of sources, including private donations, fundraising events and professional and amateur golf tournaments held across the country each year.

Since its founding in 1950, the Western Golf Association's Par Club has been one of the most important and substantial revenue streams for the Evans Scholars Foundation. There are more than 33,000 Par Club members, many of whom belong to the more than 460 WGA member clubs across the country. In 2011, the Foundation launched its first Match Play Challenge campaign, in which a group of donors pooled together gifts of $50,000 and greater to match every gift of $2,500 and greater the Foundation received.

One of the Foundation's most notable fundraising events in recent years has been the Western Golf Association's Green Coat Gala, held annually in Chicago. Golf legends Curtis Strange, Tom Watson, Jack Nicklaus, Lee Trevino, Gary Player and Johnny Miller have all been honored at the gala.

The Foundation is the benefiting charity of the BMW Championship (PGA Tour) and has received more than $35 million from the tournament since BMW became its title sponsor in 2007. In addition to those proceeds, BMW has also agreed to give the program $100,000 if a player gets a hole-in-one during championship play as Steve Stricker did in 2012 at Crooked Stick Golf Club, Hunter Mahan did during the 2013 BMW Championship at Conway Farms Golf Club, Jordan Spieth did in 2015 during the BMW Championship at Conway Farms and Jason Day did it at the 2017 BMW Championship at Conway Farms.

== Awards ==
Charity Navigator, a nonprofit organization that evaluates other charitable organizations across America based on criteria ranging from fiscal responsibility to accountability and transparency, has consistently given the Evans Scholars Foundation a four-star rating, the highest-possible rating. In 2013, the National Scholarship Providers Association, a group whose members include the Ford Foundation, the Magic Johnson Foundation and other notable nonprofits, named the Evans Scholars Foundation as its Scholarship Provider of the Year.

== Notable members ==
Several Evans Scholars Alumni have gone on to excel in the business world and other fields. They include CEOs Sam Allen of John Deere, Thomas Falk of Kimberly-Clark, former longtime chief of Nuveen Investments Timothy Schwertfeger, Iridium Communications CEO Matt Desch, and oil and gas magnate George Solich. John Schubeck, who anchored local newscasts in Los Angeles, won a scholarship while at the University of Michigan. Attorney Kyle Roche attended Purdue University after receiving his scholarship.

Former Golfweek senior writer Jeff Rude and ESPN golf writer Bob Harig have written about their experiences as Evans Scholars.
