= Joe Jemsek =

American golfer (1913–2002)

Joseph James Jemsek
- Joe Jemsek in 1936
- Born: December 24, 1913; Argo, Illinois
- Died: April 2, 2002 (aged 88); West Chicago, Illinois
- Occupation: Golfer
- Known for: Cog Hill No. 4

Joseph James Jemsek (December 24, 1913 – April 2, 2002) was an American golfer who started as a caddie, became a golf professional, and later owned and operated several public golf clubs in Chicago.

== Early years ==
Jemsek was born in 1913. He was the son of recent immigrants from Ukraine. He began to caddy when he was six, and caddied at Laramie, Acacia, and Palos Hills. When he was 15, he began caddying at Cog Hill Golf & Country Club, founded by the Coghill brothers in 1927 at Lemont, Illinois, 28 miles (45 km) to the southwest of Chicago. At the age of 17, he became a professional golfer and joined the PGA Tour for a while, then returned to Cog Hill where he took various jobs. At the 1934 Chicago World's Fair, Jemsek won a trophy for driving a golf ball from the sky-ride tower, 168 feet (51 m) high, into Lake Michigan for a distance of 501 yards (458 m).

== St. Andrews ==
The 36-hole St. Andrews golf course in West Chicago was opened in 1926 by Frank Hough. In 1929 Hough opened the Lakewood Course. Jemsek moved to St. Andrews as an instructor after disagreements about salary at Cog Hill. He married Hough's daughter Grace, and took over management of the business. In 1939 he bought the course for $40,000 using a combination of savings and a loan.

Jemsek saw demand for golfing facilities from new immigrants to Chicago from Ireland, Russia, Greece, Italy and Scandinavia who would not feel comfortable at a private club, and founded the "Jemsek Golf" company to serve this market. In 1947 St. Andrews hosted a U.S. Open qualifier, the first public course to do so, and was the first to offer United States Golf Association (USGA) handicaps for its regular players. Jemsek employed the champion woman golfer Patty Berg as head professional for almost fifty years. His clubhouse was air conditioned, and metal spikes could be worn inside. Jemsek helped to launch the Illinois PGA. In 1947 he launched the Chicago TV program "All-Star Golf", which became nationally syndicated. Jemsek became known for making golf accessible to the masses.

== Cog Hill ==
Jemsek maintained good relations with the Coghill brothers. After John and Bert Coghill had died, in 1951 the remaining brother Marty offered the course to Jemsek. He purchased the course for $400,000, agreeing to retain the Cog Hill name. Jemsek decided that his Cog Hill club would meet the same standards as the best private clubs, with excellent service and impeccably maintained courses. He hired Dick Wilson in 1963 to build a third course at Cog Hill, which involved using part of the old course #1, and adding new holes to that course to compensate. Still wanting a course that could host a PGA Championship or a U.S. Open, he asked Wilson to build a fourth course. Wilson accepted the offer but died before finishing the job, which was completed by his partner Joe Lee.

Wilson was suffering from alcoholism while he was working on Cog Hill#4. Jemsek ruled that he could not be admitted to the club house, since if he went in for lunch his drinking would destroy the rest of the day's work. Instead, his lunch was brought out to him. Jemsek's Cog Hill No. 4. course, known as "Dubsdread", became known as one of the best public golf courses in the United States. Dubsdread was later chosen to host the U.S. Amateur, the Publinx Championship and the PGA Tour's Western Open.

Jemsek and his son Frank also came to own Pine Meadow and Summer Grove in Newnan, Georgia, with the Atlanta-area course designed by grandson Joseph T. Jemsek, Frank's son. In 1987, he was named the Illinois PGA Golf Professional of the year, and received the Western Golf Association Gold Medal of Appreciation. In 1988, Jemsek was the first public golfer and PGA professional to be nominated a member of the USGA Executive Committee. That same year, he was named by Golf Magazine as one of the sport's "100 Heroes of Golf". In 1991, the PGA of America named Jemsek golf professional of the year. Jemsek was a believer in walking, and described power carts as "a necessary evil." He has been called "the impresario of daily-fee golf." He was quoted as saying "How much money do I have? If I knew I wouldn't have very much, would I?"

Jemsek died at his home in West Chicago on April 2, 2002, aged 88.
