= 1993 U.S. Women's Open =

Coordinates: 39.948°N 86.194°W

Tournament information
- Dates: July 22–25, 1993
- Location: Carmel, Indiana
- Course: Crooked Stick Golf Club
- Organized by: USGA
- Tour: LPGA Tour

Statistics
- Par: 72
- Length: 6,311 yards (5,771 m)
- Cut: 147 (+3)
- Prize fund: $800,000
- Winner's share: $144,000

Champion
- (United States) Lauri Merten
- 280 (−8)

Location in the United States
Location in Indiana

The 1993 U.S. Women's Open was the 48th U.S. Women's Open, held July 22–25 at Crooked Stick Golf Club in Carmel, Indiana, a suburb north of Indianapolis. Five strokes back after three rounds, Lauri Merten fired a 68 (−4) to win her only major title, one stroke ahead of runners-up Donna Andrews and Helen Alfredsson, the 54-hole leader.

This Open set a record for sup-par rounds at 89; the previous record was 66 in 1988. The par-72 Pete Dye-designed course was set at 6,311 yards (5,771 m), the third-longest in the championship's 48-year history. Only nine rounds were under par on Sunday.

Two years earlier, Crooked Stick was the venue for the PGA Championship, won by John Daly. It later hosted the Solheim Cup matches in 2005, won by the United States.

== Round summaries ==
=== First round ===
Friday, July 22, 1993

| Place | Player | Score | To par |
|---|---|---|---|
| T1 | (Sweden) Helen Alfredsson | 68 | −4 |
| T1 | (Japan) Ayako Okamoto | 68 | −4 |
| 3 | (Canada) Dawn Coe-Jones | 69 | −3 |
| T4 | (United States) Amy Alcott | 70 | −2 |
| T4 | (United States) Jane Geddes | 70 | −2 |
| T4 | (United States) Debbie Koyama (a) | 70 | −2 |
| T4 | (United States) Nancy Lopez | 70 | −2 |
| T4 | (United States) Michelle McGann | 70 | −2 |
| T4 | (United States) Amy Read | 70 | −2 |
| T10 | (United States) Dina Ammaccapane | 71 | −1 |
| T10 | (United States) Donna Andrews | 71 | −1 |
| T10 | (United States) JoAnne Carner | 71 | −1 |
| T10 | (Belgium) Florence Descampe | 71 | −1 |
| T10 | (United States) Nina Foust | 71 | −1 |
| T10 | (United States) Juli Inkster | 71 | −1 |
| T10 | (United States) Christa Johnson | 71 | −1 |
| T10 | (Japan) Hiromi Kobayashi | 71 | −1 |
| T10 | (United States) Lauri Merten | 71 | −1 |
| T10 | (United States) Nancy Ramsbottom | 71 | −1 |
| T10 | (United States) Kelly Robbins | 71 | −1 |

=== Second round ===
Friday, July 23, 1993

| Place | Player | Score | To par |
|---|---|---|---|
| 1 | (United States) Michelle McGann | 70-66=136 | −8 |
| T2 | (Sweden) Helen Alfredsson | 68-70=138 | −6 |
| T2 | (Japan) Hiromi Kobayashi | 71-67=138 | −6 |
| T4 | (United States) JoAnne Carner | 71-69=140 | −4 |
| T4 | (United States) Jane Geddes | 70-70=140 | −4 |
| T4 | (Japan) Ayako Okamoto | 68-72=140 | −4 |
| T4 | (United States) Sherri Steinhauer | 73-67=140 | −4 |
| T8 | (United States) Dina Ammaccapane | 71-70=141 | −3 |
| T8 | (United States) Donna Andrews | 71-70=141 | −3 |
| T8 | (Canada) Dawn Coe-Jones | 69-72=141 | −3 |
| T8 | (United States) Nancy Lopez | 70-71=141 | −3 |
| T8 | (United States) Alice Miller | 73-68=141 | −3 |
| T8 | (United States) Kelly Robbins | 71-70=141 | −3 |

=== Third round ===
Saturday, July 24, 1993

| Place | Player | Score | To par |
|---|---|---|---|
| 1 | (Sweden) Helen Alfredsson | 68-70-69=207 | −9 |
| 2 | (Japan) Hiromi Kobayashi | 71-67-71=209 | −7 |
| T3 | (United States) Donna Andrews | 71-70-69=210 | −6 |
| T3 | (United States) Pat Bradley | 72-70-68=210 | −6 |
| T5 | (United States) Dina Ammaccapane | 71-70-70=211 | −5 |
| T5 | (United States) Nancy Lopez | 70-71-70=211 | −5 |
| T5 | (Japan) Ayako Okamoto | 68-72-71=211 | −5 |
| 8 | (United States) Lauri Merten | 71-71-70=212 | −4 |
| T9 | (United States) JoAnne Carner | 71-69-73=213 | −3 |
| T9 | (England) Laura Davies | 73-71-69=213 | −3 |
| T9 | (United States) Nina Foust | 71-71-71=213 | −3 |
| T9 | (United States) Patty Sheehan | 73-71-69=213 | −3 |
| T9 | (United States) Kris Tschetter | 73-71-69=213 | −3 |

=== Final round ===
Sunday, July 25, 1993

| Place | Player | Score | To par | Money ($) |
|---|---|---|---|---|
| 1 | (United States) Lauri Merten | 71-71-70-68=280 | −8 | 144,000 |
| T2 | (Sweden) Helen Alfredsson | 68-70-69-74=281 | −7 | 62,431 |
| T2 | (United States) Donna Andrews | 71-70-69-71=281 | −7 | 62,431 |
| T4 | (United States) Pat Bradley | 72-70-68-73=283 | −5 | 29,249 |
| T4 | (Japan) Hiromi Kobayashi | 71-67-71-74=283 | −5 | 29,249 |
| 6 | (United States) Patty Sheehan | 73-71-69-71=284 | −4 | 22,379 |
| T7 | (United States) Betsy King | 74-70-72-69=285 | −3 | 17,525 |
| T7 | (United States) Nancy Lopez | 70-71-70-74=285 | −3 | 17,525 |
| T7 | (United States) Michelle McGann | 70-66-78-71=285 | −3 | 17,525 |
| T7 | (Japan) Ayako Okamoto | 68-72-71-74=285 | −3 | 17,525 |
