= Trial by television in golf tournaments =

Phenomenon in sport

Golf is an unusual sport in that television viewers can directly influence the outcome of a game by reporting rules infringements which would otherwise have been missed. Numerous golfers have been penalized at, or disqualified from, televised tournaments after a rules infringement which was not spotted by players or a referee at the time but was later noticed by a member of the public and communicated to tournament officials by phone, tweet or email. If a player has already signed their scorecard by the time such an infringement is discovered, disqualification is frequently the outcome. In April 2011, the USGA and The R&A announced a rule change which would allow players to avoid disqualification if a rules infringement was discovered after they had signed their scorecard. In December 2017, the same bodies announced a local rule change which would greatly limit the number of such incidents from 1 January 2018.

== Instances of golf tournaments being influenced by television viewers ==
Date	Player	Tournament	Details
7 Feb 1987	Craig Stadler	Shearson Lehman Brothers Andy Williams Open	At the 14th hole in his third round at Torrey Pines in 1987, Stadler knelt on a towel as he set up for a shot under the overhanging branches of a tree. TV viewers rang tournament organizers to point out that he had broken rule 13–3, which prohibits building a stance. He was disqualified after appearing to finish in a tie for second place. In 1995, Stadler got revenge on the tree which had caused him so much trouble when Torrey Pines offered him the opportunity to cut it down.
28 Feb 1991	Paul Azinger	Doral-Ryder Open	Azinger received a retrospective 2 shot penalty during his second round at Doral Country Club after a TV viewer from Colorado noticed that he had dislodged a stone while taking his stance in a water hazard on the 18th hole of his first round. Azinger was only one shot off the lead at the time but was penalized under rule 13-4 for moving a loose impediment in a hazard and disqualified for signing for an incorrect score.
14 Sep 1997	Mark O'Meara	Trophée Lancôme	O'Meara lipped out for par on the 15th hole of his final round at Saint-Nom-la-Bretèche and opted to mark his ball, eventually holing the 3 foot return putt for bogey. Weeks later, a Swedish TV viewer noticed that O'Meara had appeared to replace his ball slightly in front of his marker, after which, ABC Sports aired a video during the Houston Open appearing to confirm that. Following the controversy, runner up, Jarmo Sandelin called in vain for the title and prize money to be passed to him. European Tour Chief Referee, John Paramor, viewed footage of the incident and stated that had it been known at the time, O'Meara should've been penalised 2 shots for the incorrect ball placement under rule 14.7. O'Meara insisted he had not knowingly broken any rules and sought advice from the US and European Tours, who informed him that as the tournament was long over, the result stood.
6 Jan 2011	Camilo Villegas	Tournament of Champions	Villegas was disqualified after the second round at Kapalua, Hawaii, when a TV viewer pointed out a rules infringement on his 15th hole. After twice chipping up a slope only to see the ball roll back to him, he had brushed away some grass from in front of his divot while the ball was still rolling. A two shot penalty was enforced after he'd signed his scorecard, which resulted in disqualification for signing for an incorrect score.
12 Apr 2013	Tiger Woods	Masters Tournament	Woods was penalized 2 shots for taking an incorrect drop on the 15th hole of his second round after finding water at the par 5. PGA Tour Champions golfer and experienced rules official, David Eger, spotted the breach on television and contacted tournament officials but following an initial review of the incident, it was decided that no offense had taken place. However, in a post-round interview with ESPN, Woods unknowingly incriminated himself by saying that he dropped "two yards" behind the location of the original shot. Officials then had no choice but to reverse their decision and apply a 2 shot penalty under rule 33–7, which allows the committee to waive disqualification. Nick Faldo called for Woods to withdraw because he had knowingly dropped in the wrong place but he declined to do so.
3 May 2013	Sergio García	Wells Fargo Championship	García was cleared of any wrongdoing after a TV viewer claimed that he'd replaced his ball incorrectly on the 17th hole of his second round at Quail Hollow. His 68 stood after rules officials reviewed footage of the incident and decided that García had no case to answer.
13 Jun 2013	Steve Stricker	U.S. Open	A television viewer notified USGA officials that Stricker had improved the lie in an area where he intended to take a drop after a poor tee shot on the 3rd hole of his 1st round at the 2013 US Open at Merion Golf Club, Pennsylvania. Officials reviewed footage of the alleged incident and determined that no rule had been broken.
13 Jun 2013	Adam Scott	U.S. Open	Several television viewers thought that Scott had grounded his club in a hazard on the 5th hole of his 1st round at the 2013 US Open at Merion Golf Club. A rules official discussed the incident with Scott after the round and determined that no rule had been broken.
20 Jan 2011	Pádraig Harrington	Abu Dhabi Golf Championship	Harrington brushed his ball and moved it very slightly closer to the hole as he removed his ball marker on the 16th green in his first round and was given a retrospective two-stroke penalty. As he had already signed his scorecard, he was disqualified for signing for a wrong score. Harrington later stated that he had been sure that the ball returned to its original position after he touched it but slow motion replays showed that it had moved forward 'three dimples' and back 'maybe a dimple and a half'. European Tour senior referee, Andy McFee, had to watch footage of the incident about 60 times before concluding that an infringement had actually occurred.
23 Aug 2010	Juli Inkster	Safeway Classic	Inkster was disqualified after swinging a weighted training aid during a 30-minute wait on the 10th tee during her third round, after a television viewer contacted tournament organizers to query the use of the aid. While rules staff at the tournament made the initial ruling, they also contacted the USGA for confirmation. She was informed of the disqualification after leaving the final green and stated that she was unaware that she had broken any rule.
16 Nov 2012	Yoo Sun-young	CME Group Titleholders	Yoo Sun-young was penalized 1 shot for an incorrect drop on the 14th hole of her second round after several TV viewers tweeted that her arm was below horizontal when she dropped the ball after taking an unplayable lie.
16 Mar 2013	Stacy Lewis	RR Donnelley LPGA Founders Cup	Lewis was penalized 2 shots after a TV viewer noticed her caddie testing the sand in a fairway bunker on the 16th hole of her third round. He had appeared to bounce on his right foot in an apparent attempt to gauge the thickness of the sand, thus violating rule 13–4. Lewis went on to win the tournament after a final round 64 and afterwards thanked the caller who had reported the rule breach, because it gave her more motivation.
2 Apr 2017	Lexi Thompson	ANA Inspiration	Thompson was penalized 4 shots as she walked off the 12th hole in the final round at Mission Hills Country Club, California after a TV viewer called in to point out that she had incorrectly replaced her ball on the 17th green the previous day. The LPGA didn't reach a decision on the penalty until midway through the final round, when she was penalized two shots for an incorrect ball placement and a further two shots for signing an incorrect scorecard. Despite this, she fought back to get into a playoff, eventually losing to Ryu So-yeon.
19 Feb 2012	Peter Whiteford	Avantha Masters	Whiteford was disqualified early in the final round after TV viewers reported that his ball had moved prior to playing his 3rd shot to the 18th hole of his 3rd round. Those present at the incident had agreed that the ball hadn't moved but TV replays confirmed that it had, so Whiteford was penalized one shot and disqualified for signing for an incorrect score.
25 Mar 2005	Colin Montgomerie	Indonesian Open	Montgomerie left the course without marking his ball following a weather warning while preparing to play his third shot on the 14th hole of his second round at Cengkareng Golf Club. On returning the next day and finding that his ball had been removed, he placed a new ball in a position which allowed him to take a much easier stance and save par. While the tournament referee and his playing partners were initially happy with the ball's placement, Søren Kjeldsen and Gerry Norquist later contacted tour officials to express concern after viewing television pictures of the incident. No action was taken at the time but European Tour chief referee, John Paramor, later reviewed the footage and stated that he would have applied a two shot penalty in that situation. On viewing video of the incident, Montgomerie admitted that the ball had been replaced incorrectly and donated his £24,000 winnings to charity, an action which some viewed as an admission of cheating. However, he retained the world ranking points that came with his tied 4th-place finish, which he needed in an attempt to regain a place in the world's top 50 and become eligible for the upcoming US Masters. Although cleared of any wrongdoing at the time, the Players' Tournament Committee later issued a carefully worded statement to express their dissatisfaction with Montgomerie's actions. and the incident fuelled a long running feud with Sandy Lyle.
25 Oct 2013	Simon Dyson	BMW Masters	Dyson was tied for second going into the 3rd round but was disqualified after being penalized for touching the line of his putt on the 8th green during his second round, a breach of rule 16-1a. Chief referee, John Paramor, had viewed footage of the incident after several television viewers had contacted tournament officials to report that Dyson had tapped something down with his ball on the line of his putt. Having therefore signed for an incorrect score, Dyson was disqualified. A three-man disciplinary panel later fined him £30,000 and gave him a 2-month ban, suspended for 18 months, for deliberately pressing down a spike mark despite knowing it to be against the rules. The director of tour operations had decided that extra investigation was required after officials found evidence of other similar violations earlier in the season.
24 May 2012	Graeme McDowell	BMW PGA Championship	McDowell's drive on the 18th hole of his 1st round at Wentworth finished in trees on the right of the fairway. After playing his second shot, he asked on-course reporter, Richard Boxall, to have the Sky Sports studio team review the tape to determine if the ball had moved before he addressed it but by the time it was found that it had rotated by 'a couple of dimples', a TV viewer had already called Sky to report the infraction. McDowell was therefore penalized 2 shots – one for causing his ball to move and one for not replacing it after it was deemed to have moved while he was still 10 feet away from it. The first penalty shot was unavoidable under the rules but the second could've been avoided if McDowell had had the incident reviewed before taking his second shot. He stated afterwards that players had become scared of trial by TV.
9 Jul 2017	Jon Rahm	Dubai Duty Free Irish Open	Rahm escaped penalty after appearing to replace his ball incorrectly on the 6th green of his final round at Portstewart Golf Club. His birdie putt finished on playing partner, Daniel Im's, ball marker, so he marked his ball to the side and then moved his marker one putter head away to avoid Im's line. However, when replacing the ball, he appeared to place it in front of the marker rather than beside it. Tour officials received 4 emails from television viewers regarding the incident but were already aware of it. The tournament's chief referee, Andy McFee, spoke to Rahm on the 13th green and accepted that he had 'definitely made the effort' to replace the ball correctly. Some professional golfers, including Brandel Chamblee and Steve Flesch expressed concern that Rahm escaped penalty because it was accepted that it was not his 'intent' to cheat. Rahm won the tournament by 6 shots and later explained that his unorthodox marking had been done to save time as it was raining.
12 May 2005	Miguel Ángel Martín	British Masters	A television viewer notified tournament officials that Martin had stood on a sapling which would've interfered with his swing while taking a stance for a shot on the 9th hole (his 18th) at the Forest of Arden, thus breaching Rule 13–2. European Tour chief referee, John Paramor, said that since he could've taken his stance without standing on the sapling, he should've incurred a penalty of 2 strokes. Since Martin had already submitted his card without including the penalty, he was disqualified for signing for a wrong score. Martin had signed for a 1 under par 71 and was only 2 shots behind the leaders when he was disqualified and stated afterwards that he hadn't thought he was breaking any rules. Martin had previously faced allegations of cheating when Maarten Lafeber accused him of improving his lie at the Portuguese Open in 2002 and only agreed to sign his card under duress.
23 Mar 1980	Tom Watson	MONY Tournament of Champions	Tom Watson was penalized 2 shots after television microphones picked up a comment from Lee Trevino, saying that Watson had advised him to change his stance during the final round at La Costa. After a TV viewer called officials to highlight the rule breach, Watson was asked about the incident and admitted giving Trevino advice. He was penalized 2 strokes under rule 8-1 but still went on to win by 3 shots from Jim Colbert.
13 Sep 2013	Tiger Woods	BMW Championship	Woods was penalized 2 shots after a freelance videographer for PGA Tour Entertainment filmed his ball moving slightly on the 1st hole of his 2nd round at Conway Farms Golf Club and an editor spotted the infringement while working on the footage. A 1 shot penalty was assessed under Rule 18-2a when Woods moved a twig near his ball, causing it to move but because he did not then replace the ball, a further 1 shot penalty was applied. Slugger White, the PGA Tour VP of Rules and Competitions, advised Woods not to sign his card until he had seen video footage of the incident. Woods vehemently disagreed with the rules officials' view that his ball had moved from its position, insisting instead that it had merely oscillated. He was furious after being notified of the penalty and reportedly punched a wall in anger. The resulting quadruple bogey 8 changed his score for the round from 70 to 72 but Woods escaped disqualification because the issue was raised before he signed his card.
30 Nov 2018	Tiger Woods	Hero World Challenge	On the 18th hole of his second round, Woods missed the fairway to the right, his ball eventually finishing at the base of a bush in a native area. Playing on his knees and with a much restricted backswing, Woods used an 8 iron to hit the ball 15 yards forward into the rough, from where he proceeded to double bogey the hole en route to a score of 69. Slow motion, ultra high definition video replays of the shot prompted commentators to suggest that Woods may have either hit the ball twice or scooped it back into play, potentially in violation of Rule 14-1 or Rule 14–4. After completing the round, Woods reviewed footage of the incident in the scorer's hut with rules officials, who decided that no penalty would be applied. He later admitted that even though he had intended to play a legitimate shot and thought he had done so, video footage of the incident did appear to show a double hit. Woods avoided a penalty due to a decision in the rules of golf that was introduced in 2017, which states that a penalty will not be applied in circumstances where the infraction is only visible using the degree of precision that can be provided by video technology.
11 Mar 2021	Viktor Hovland	The Players Championship	After his first round, Hovland received a phone call from a TV viewer, alerting him to the fact that he had putted from the wrong place on the 15th green, in violation of rule 14.7. After receiving the call (from his mother who was watching in Norway), he immediately rang rules officials and requested a review of the incident. Video footage confirmed that he had moved his ball by the length of a putter head after finishing on Justin Thomas's line but then moved it an additional putter head in the wrong direction instead of returning the ball to its original location. Hovland stated that he had no recollection of breaking the rule but accepted the penalty, thus increasing his score for the round from 70 to 72. He avoided disqualification thanks to Rule 3.3b, which allows a player to be retroactively penalised shots for unknowingly violating a rule.
18 Jul 2025	Shane Lowry	The Open Championship	On the par-5 12th hole of his second round, Lowry took a practice swing in the left rough, where his drive had finished. While playing the 15th hole in the same round, he was informed by a rules official that the broadcast TV feed appeared to show his ball move when he took that practice swing. Following a 20 minute review, the R&A stated that they considered Lowry's ball to have moved in a "clear" manner and applied a one shot penalty for causing the ball to move and a further shot penalty for playing from the wrong place. Lowry maintained that he hadn't seen any movement despite looking towards the ball at the time but accepted the ruling as he did not want to be thought a cheat. Many commentators stated that the ruling was unduly harsh and that officials should've accepted Lowry's word that he didn't see the ball move, while the R&A stated that the 'naked eye' test applies whether the player saw the movement or not. The penalty increased Lowry's score for the round from 70 to 72 but he still made the cut, eventually finishing T40th.
