= Beverly Country Club =

Country club in Chicago, Illinois, U.S.

Coordinates: 41°44′05″N 87°41′05″W

- Interactive map of Beverly Country Club

Club information
- Location: Evergreen Park, IL, USA
- Established: 1908
- Type: Private
- Total holes: 18
- Tournaments: U.S. Amateur (1931); U.S. Senior Amateur (2009); Western Open (1910, 1963, 1967, 1970); Western Amateur (1930), (2014); Women's Western Open (1937, 1960, 1965); Illinois State Amateur Championship (2010) and Chicago Victory National Open (1943)
- Website: Beverly Country Club
- Designed by: Donald Ross
- Par: 71
- Length: 7016 yards Longest hole is #11 - 604 yards
- Course rating: 74.2
- Course record: 61 - Tim Streng (2023)

The Beverly Country Club, located in Evergreen Park, Illinois, is one of Chicago's historical cornerstones. The club was founded in 1908 and initially designed by George O'Neil, also the club's first professional golfer. Shortly after, well-known golf course architect Tom Bendelow helped fortify the layout. In 1918, the architect Donald Ross created and executed a plan to renovate the course. In 1919, Eddie Loos was serving as the head professional and paired with Jim Barnes to win a match played against Jock Hutchison and Bob MacDonald.

Since, the Beverly Country Club has been a mainstay in American golfing circles. In 2002, the members of the Beverly Country Club adopted a plan to completely restore and rejuvenate the golf course. Under guidance of golf course architect and restorer Ron Prichard, the course has recaptured the design concepts which Ross included in his original work at the Beverly Country Club.

The Beverly Country Club was annexed by Evergreen Park, Illinois in April of 2025. It was previously located in unincorporated Cook County, bordering both Evergreen Park and Chicago.

== Architectural history ==
In 1918, Beverly club officials asked golf architect Donald Ross to create a plan to renovate the course and bring it back to major championship standards. Over the course of nearly a decade, the entire Ross plan was adopted.

Ross designed the course such that no two consecutive holes run in the same direction, despite the fact that the course is laid out within a perfect rectangle that is hemmed in and bisected by three arterial streets and a railroad line.

Much of the course is centered around a prominent ridge that runs from behind the fifth green eastward through the promontory above the second fairway. Five holes on the front nine are designed around this ridge, which had been part of the southern shore of prehistoric Lake Chicago, a forgotten body of water that deposited sand dunes along Beverly's back nine.

In 2002, A dedicated group of Beverly members, under guidance of Ron Prichard, led the club through a restoration of the golf course that reclaimed many of the Ross features that had been lost over the decades.

Stretching beyond 7,000 yards, Beverly is regularly named by golf publications as one of the nation's best courses, and recently ranked No. 51 on Golfweek's list of the Best Classic Courses in the United States.

== Tournament history ==
Over the years, Beverly has been the host of one U.S. Amateur (1931); one U.S. Senior Amateur (2009); one Western Junior (2011); four Western Opens (1910, 1963, 1967 and 1970); two Western Amateurs (1930, 2014); three Women's Western Opens (1937, 1960 and 1965); and the 1943 Chicago Victory National Open, a wartime substitute for the National Open.

The Beverly Country Club hosted the 2011 Western Golf Association (WGA) Western Junior, making it one of only a handful of clubs that has hosted three original WGA Golf Championships: the Western Open (known now as the BMW Championship), the Western Amateur and the Western Junior.

In 2014, Beverly hosted the Western Amateur for the first time since 1930. The tournament, played July 28 – August 2, was won by Beau Hossler. The tournament also saw Beverly's long-standing course record of 64, broken by Doug Ghim with an 8-under 63, in the second round of stroke play. The course record had stood for 47 years. The Western Amateur will return to Beverly in 2026.

== Famous tournament champions ==
- 1910 Western Open won by Chick Evans
- In 1925, Virginia Van Wie captured one of her first championships at Beverly Country Club
- 1931 U.S. Amateur won by Francis Ouimet
- 1963 Western Open won by Arnold Palmer
- 1967 Western Open won by Jack Nicklaus
- 1970 Western Open won by Hugh Royer Jr.
- Patty Berg and Babe Zaharias have each held the women's course record which is still held by Susie Maxwell

== Caddie tradition ==
The Beverly Country Club has a relationship with the Western Golf Association and the Evans Scholars Foundation, a charitable trust which provides full-tuition scholarships renewable for up to four years to deserving caddies. The program started in 1930 and was originally endowed with the donated golf winnings of Chick Evans, all of whose golf winnings went toward the scholarships as a way of preserving his amateur status. Today the Evans Scholarship Foundation is supported by tens of thousands of contributors across the country, one of the largest of which is the Beverly Country Club. With 389 of the 12,575 Evans Scholars Alumni, The Beverly Country Club boasts the record for the largest number of Evans Scholar alumni from any single club in America.

== Holes ==
Hole #	Name	Par	Yards
1	The Woods	4	356
2	Downtown	5	582
3	Long One	3	245
4	Boomerang	4	399
5	Plateau	4	415
6	Drop Zone	3	189
7	Periscope	5	574
8	Punchbowl	4	424
9	Turn Two	4	413

Hole #	Name	Par	Yards
10	Railroad	3	198
11	Old Profanity	5	604
12	Stay Dry	3	165
13	Inspiration	4	385
14	Top Shelf	4	333
15	Midway	4	465
16	The Dells	4	441
17	Citadel	3	229
18	Long Way Home	5	599
