= Crooked Stick Golf Club =

Private golf course in Carmel, IN, US

- Interactive map of Crooked Stick Golf Club
- 39.9479°N 86.1941°W

Club information
- Location: 1964 Burning Tree Lane; Carmel, Indiana; United States
- Established: 1964
- Type: Private
- Total holes: 18
- Tournaments: PGA Championship (1991); U.S. Women's Open (1993); Solheim Cup (2005); U.S. Senior Open (2009); BMW Championship (2012, 2016)
- Website: crookedstick.org
- Designed by: Pete and Alice Dye
- Par: 72
- Length: 7,567 yards (6,919 m)
- Course rating: 77.7
- Slope rating: 148

Crooked Stick Golf Club is a golf club located in Carmel, Indiana, a suburb north of Indianapolis. The 18-hole Pete and Alice Dye designed golf course was built in 1964. It has been noted as one of the top 100 courses in the United States by Golfweek and Golf Magazine, two of golf's most popular magazines.

Crooked Stick was host to the PGA Championship in 1991 won by John Daly and the U.S. Women's Open in 1993, won by Lauri Merten. It also hosted the Solheim Cup matches in 2005. Crooked Stick also hosted the PGA Tour's BMW Championship in 2012 and 2016, when Dustin Johnson won with a record breaking -23.

== Scorecard ==
Crooked Stick Golf Club
| Tee | Rating/Slope | 1 | 2 | 3 | 4 | 5 | 6 | 7 | 8 | 9 | Out | 10 | 11 | 12 | 13 | 14 | 15 | 16 | 17 | 18 | In | Total |
| Black | 77.7 / 146 | 358 | 442 | 205 | 483 | 621 | 201 | 454 | 456 | 530 | 3750 | 445 | 595 | 424 | 194 | 497 | 523 | 470 | 212 | 457 | 3817 | 7567 |
| Gold | 75.9 / 142 | 348 | 425 | 191 | 440 | 597 | 189 | 446 | 430 | 522 | 3588 | 427 | 538 | 419 | 166 | 462 | 510 | 433 | 199 | 417 | 3571 | 7159 |
| Blue | 72.8 / 132 | 321 | 384 | 171 | 408 | 591 | 183 | 372 | 395 | 491 | 3316 | 370 | 502 | 407 | 152 | 421 | 484 | 407 | 180 | 408 | 3331 | 6647 |
| White | 70.9 / 129 | 315 | 375 | 160 | 365 | 515 | 153 | 360 | 375 | 475 | 3093 | 358 | 490 | 360 | 145 | 371 | 457 | 401 | 175 | 331 | 3088 | 6181 |
| SI | Men's | 9 | 11 | 17 | 3 | 5 | 13 | 15 | 1 | 7 | | 14 | 8 | 4 | 18 | 2 | 10 | 12 | 16 | 6 |
| Par | | 4 | 4 | 3 | 4 | 5 | 3 | 4 | 4 | 5 | 36 | 4 | 5 | 4 | 3 | 4 | 5 | 4 | 3 | 4 | 36 | 72 |
| Green | 73.0 / 132 | 298 | 335 | 147 | 279 | 437 | 110 | 331 | 349 | 417 | 2703 | 325 | 480 | 340 | 128 | 366 | 423 | 380 | 140 | 326 | 2908 | 5611 |
| Red | 70.8 / 127 | 283 | 302 | 131 | 274 | 432 | 109 | 326 | 306 | 412 | 2575 | 305 | 417 | 331 | 122 | 274 | 418 | 344 | 122 | 293 | 2626 | 5201 |
| SI | Women's | 9 | 13 | 17 | 11 | 1 | 15 | 7 | 5 | 3 | | 10 | 4 | 6 | 18 | 12 | 2 | 8 | 16 | 14 |

== Major tournaments hosted ==
| Year | Tournament | Winner |
|---|---|---|
| 1991 | PGA Championship | John Daly |
| 1993 | U.S. Women's Open | Lauri Merten |
| 2005 | Solheim Cup | Team USA |
| 2009 | U.S. Senior Open | Fred Funk |
| 2012 | BMW Championship | Rory McIlroy |
| 2016 | BMW Championship | Dustin Johnson |
