= Lee Schmidt =

American golf course architect (born 1947)

- Born: September 14, 1947 (age 78); Carmel, Indiana
- Education: Purdue University College of Agriculture
- Occupation: Golf course architect
- Employer: Schmidt-Curley Design Inc.
- Organization: American Society of Golf Course Architects
- Awards: Golf Magazine's "Architect of the Year" (2011)

Lee Schmidt (born September 14, 1947) is a golf course architect and principal of Schmidt-Curley Design Inc. He was raised in Carmel, Indiana and currently resides in Scottsdale, Arizona. Schmidt is a member of the American Society of Golf Course Architects (ASGCA) and currently serves on its executive committee.

== Education ==
Schmidt is a 1970 graduate of Purdue University's School of Agriculture and was named a "Distinguished Alumni" in 2004. He was selected and honored by Purdue University as an "Old Master" in 2011, a program honoring graduates who have made significant contributions to his or her own field.

== Work experience ==
Schmidt began his career working with fellow Indiana native Pete Dye. He spent seven years with Dye working on projects like Virginia's Kingsmill Resort and Casa de Campo in the Dominican Republic. Schmidt then moved to Landmark Land Company for 12 years, where he was a vice president of the Design and Construction Division. While there he led the design team at courses like PGA West Stadium Course in La Quinta and Mission Hills(California). Schmidt also spent seven years with Nicklaus Design as a senior design associate gaining significant international experience.

At Landmark, Schmidt met his future business partner Brian Curley. In 1997, they formed Schmidt-Curley Design, working primarily in the Southwestern United States. Schmidt-Curley soon focused much of its business interests on the burgeoning Asian market with a strong emphasis on China. They are considered leaders of the China golf course development movement and were subsequently cited by Golf Inc. Magazine in 2011 as one of golf's most influential architects.

== Select Course Portfolio for Schmidt-Curley Design ==
=== United States ===
- Bali Hai Golf Club - Las Vegas, Nevada
- Morongo Golf Club at Tukwet Canyon - Beaumont, California
- Oak Harbor - Slidell, Louisiana
- Siena Golf Club - Las Vegas, Nevada
- Southern Dunes Golf Club - Maricopa, Arizona
- Sun City Shadow Hills - Indio, California

=== China ===
- Agile Country Club - Zhongshan
- Clearwater Bay - Lingshui (36 Holes)
- Dragon Valley Golf Course - Sanya
- Nanlihu Golf Course - Haikou

=== Thailand ===
- Amata Spring Country Club - Chonburi
- Chiangmai Highlands - Chiang Mai
- Muang Kaew (remodel) - Bangkok
- Siam Country Club - Pattaya (45 Holes)

== International tournament hosts ==
- Amata Spring Country Club – Royal Trophy (2006–07, 2009–10), Asia-Pacific Amateur Championship (2012)
- Mission Hills Shenzhen, Olazabal Course – World Cup of Golf (2007–09), WGC-HSBC Champions (2012)
- Mission Hills Hainan, The Vintage Course – World Ladies Championship (2012)
- Mission Hills Hainan, Blackstone Course – World Cup of Golf (2011), Mission Hills Star Trophy (2010), Mission Hills World Celebrity Pro-Am (2012)
- Siam Country Club, Old Course – Honda LPGA Thailand (2007, 2010–12)
- Siam Country Club, Plantation Course – Honda LPGA Thailand (2009)
- Terra Lago Golf Club – The Skins Game (1999–2002)
- Tianjin Binhai Lake, Pete Dye Course – Volvo China Championship (2012)
- Wildfire Golf Club, JW Marriott Desert Ridge Resort & Spa – R.R. Donnelley's Founders Cup (2012)

== Select awards ==
- Golf Magazine
  - "Architect of the Year" (2011)
  - "Best New" Asia Course (Blackstone Course, Mission Hills Hainan) (2010)
  - "Best New" International Course (Lava Fields Course, Mission Hills Hainan) (2011)
- Asian Golf Monthly
  - "Best Golf Course Architects" (2011, 2012, 2013)
- Golf World Magazine
  - "World Top 100" (Lava Fields Course, Mission Hills Hainan) (2011)
