= BMW Championship (disambiguation) =

The BMW Championship is an event on the PGA Tour.

BMW Championship may also refer to:

- BMW PGA Championship on the European Tour; known as the BMW Championship from 2005 to 2006
