= Pine Tree Golf Club =

Private golf club in Boynton Beach, Florida

- Pine Tree
- Interactive map of Pine Tree Golf Club
- 26.5192°N 80.1124°W

Club information
- Location: 10600 Pine Tree Terrace; Boynton Beach, Florida, U.S.
- Established: 1960
- Type: Private
- Tota holes: 18
- Tournaments: 1978 U.S. Senior Amateur
- Website: pinetreegolfclub.net
- Designed by: Louis Sibbett "Dick" Wilson, Joseph L. Lee
- Par: 72
- Length: 7,301 yd (6,676 m)
- Course rating: 75.3
- Slope rating: 138
- Course record: 60 - Steve Scott in 2000, Amateur Record - 63 held by Ed Tutwiler in 1975 and Buzz Peel in 2007

Pine Tree Golf Club is a private golf club in Boynton Beach, Florida.

== Details ==
In 1960, Louis Sibbett "Dick" Wilson was commissioned by the founder members (including Walker Cupers) to fashion an outstanding golf course on lush, green, semi-tropical dairy farmland purchased from the Weaver's in Boynton Beach, Florida. The 18-hole club, opened for play in January 1962 was built (over a 168-acre stretch of sand and slash pine) by golf course architect Joseph L. Lee, "Gentleman Joe" (a Wilson protege). Pine Tree was remodeled by Lee, in 1990, Ron Forse in 1997 and Bobby Weed in 2005. The club built two guest houses. One was named after founder member Louis Gumpert. The other was called "The Wilson" where Wilson stayed when he died in 1965.

Arnold Palmer and Dow Finsterwald, both professionally connected with clubs near by, applied for conventional, private memberships. Popular quotes include, "The best course I have ever seen."—Ben Hogan, "A truly great course."—Jack Nicklaus, "The greatest course I have ever played."—Ruth Jessen, "Dick Wilson's greatest work of all."—Gardner Dickinson.

Legends such as Sam Snead, Tommy Armour, Louise Suggs, Mickey Wright and JoAnne Carner have called Pine Tree their home winter club. Other World Golf Hall of Fame members include Beth Daniel, Karrie Webb and Meg Mallon. Pine Tree has been rated as high as the First 10 of America's 100 Most Testing Courses (1969-1970) by Golf Digest.

== USGA host ==
In 1978, Pine Tree hosted the U.S. Senior Amateur. Four of the 144 qualifiers from forty-seven states were members of Pine Tree, which at the time was rated in the top twenty courses in the country. Two members were semi-finalists - Ed Tutwiler and Dale Morey. The tournament was won by Gen. Keith K. Compton, U.S.A.F. (Ret.) of Marble Falls, Texas.

== Scorecard ==
Pine Tree Golf Club
| Tee | Rating/Slope | 1 | 2 | 3 | 4 | 5 | 6 | 7 | 8 | 9 | Out | 10 | 11 | 12 | 13 | 14 | 15 | 16 | 17 | 18 | In | Total |
| Black | 75.3 / 138 | 413 | 186 | 416 | 437 | 603 | 218 | 474 | 395 | 521 | 3663 | 507 | 227 | 456 | 158 | 378 | 358 | 666 | 430 | 458 | 3638 | 7301 |
| Gold | 73.9 / 135 | 389 | 172 | 416 | 437 | 574 | 187 | 446 | 375 | 501 | 3497 | 467 | 206 | 437 | 158 | 360 | 358 | 627 | 417 | 436 | 3466 | 6963 |
| Silver | 72.5 / 132 | 378 | 163 | 401 | 416 | 558 | 179 | 426 | 351 | 501 | 3373 | 448 | 195 | 416 | 137 | 343 | 329 | 601 | 401 | 407 | 3277 | 6650 |
| Blue | 71.7 / 130 | 368 | 154 | 390 | 399 | 535 | 162 | 416 | 351 | 489 | 3264 | 491 | 183 | 401 | 137 | 343 | 329 | 555 | 387 | 390 | 3216 | 6480 |
| White | 70.4 / 128 | 345 | 138 | 369 | 378 | 510 | 147 | 401 | 338 | 477 | 3103 | 478 | 169 | 390 | 124 | 325 | 316 | 535 | 371 | 367 | 3075 | 6178 |
| Bronze | 68.4 / 126 | 345 | 138 | 369 | 378 | 431 | 133 | 319 | 338 | 477 | 2928 | 435 | 169 | 270 | 124 | 325 | 316 | 458 | 371 | 310 | 2778 | 5706 |
| Par | Men's | 4 | 3 | 4 | 4 | 5 | 3 | 4 | 4 | 5 | 36 | 5 | 3 | 4 | 3 | 4 | 4 | 5 | 4 | 4 | 36 | 72 |
| SI | Men's | 5 | 17 | 9 | 7 | 1 | 15 | 3 | 11 | 13 | | 8 | 16 | 4 | 18 | 12 | 14 | 2 | 6 | 10 |
| Red | 71.9 / 133 | 335 | 133 | 337 | 322 | 431 | 121 | 319 | 318 | 460 | 2776 | 425 | 129 | 270 | 112 | 277 | 298 | 458 | 313 | 310 | 2592 | 5368 |
| Par | Women's | 4 | 3 | 4 | 4 | 5 | 3 | 4 | 4 | 5 | 36 | 5 | 3 | 4 | 3 | 4 | 4 | 5 | 4 | 4 | 36 | 72 |
| SI | Women's | 3 | 17 | 9 | 13 | 11 | 15 | 7 | 5 | 1 | | 12 | 18 | 6 | 14 | 10 | 8 | 2 | 16 | 4 |
