= Butler National Golf Club =

Golf course in Oak Brook, Illinois, US

- Interactive map of Butler National Golf Club
- 41.841°N 87.933°W

Club information
- Location: Oak Brook, Illinois, United States
- Established: 1972
- Type: Private
- Tota holes: 18
- Tournaments: Western Open (1974–1990)
- Website: butlernational.org

Course
- Designed by: George & Tom Fazio
- Par: 71
- Length: 7,523 yards (6,879 m)
- Course rating: 78.1
- Slope rating: 152

Butler National Golf Club is a private golf club located in Oak Brook, Illinois.

== History ==
Butler National was the creation of Paul Butler, an affluent entrepreneur, philanthropist, and sportsman who was also the founder of the village of Oak Brook, Illinois.

In 1972, renowned golf course architect George Fazio designed Butler on what was previously York Country Club. It was built and seeded in the relatively short span of two years, and the construction was completed under the supervision of Fazio's nephew Tom Fazio, an internationally acclaimed architect in his own right.

This club was home to the PGA Tour's Western Open from 1974 to 1990. The course policy of not allowing female members caused the club to lose the Western Open.

In May 2007, Golf Digest rated Butler 21st of "America's 100 Greatest Courses."

== Course ==
Butler National is a relatively flat, tree-lined course, requiring solid golf shots to shoot a good score. The Fazio design is penal and rewards successful positioning and shot shaping. A right to left ball flight is preferable as there are more dog leg lefts than rights. Water hazards will frequently come into play as do the deep faced bunkers. There are approximately 40 sand bunkers.

The Butler (back) tees play 7,523 yards (6,879 m), with a course rating of 78.1 and slope rating of 155.

In the fall of 2004, all of the greens were converted to an A-1 Bent grass and the sand to tour grade signature. The greens are fast, but the difficulty comes in reading the greens as they are very subtle.

== Membership policy ==
Butler National Golf Club is one of four all-male golf courses in the Chicago area. Butler has not hosted a PGA or USGA tournament since 1990 due to their admissions policy, most notably missing the opportunity to host the US Open.
