= Pete Dye =

American golf course designer (1925–2020)

- Born: Paul Dye Jr. December 29, 1925; Urbana, Ohio, U.S.
- Died: January 9, 2020 (aged 94); La Romana, Dominican Republic
- Education: Rollins College
- Occupation: Golf course designer
- Spouse: Alice (O'Neal) Dye (m. 1950; died 2019)
- Children: 2
- Parent(s): Elizabeth and Paul "Pink" Dye
- Awards: World Golf Hall of Fame; PGA Tour Lifetime Achievement Award; Old Tom Morris Award; Doctor of Landscape Architecture; ASGCA Donald Ross Award

Pete Dye
- Military career
- Allegiance: United States
- Branch: U.S. Army
- Service years: 1942–1944
- Unit: Fort Bragg

Paul Dye Jr. (December 29, 1925 – January 9, 2020), commonly referred to as Pete Dye, was an American golf course designer and a member of a family of course designers. He was married to fellow designer and amateur champion Alice Dye.

== Early life ==
Dye was born on December 29, 1925, in Urbana, Ohio. He was the son of Paul F. "Pink" and Elizabeth Dye. A few years before Dye's birth, his father became involved with golf and built a nine-hole course on family land in Champaign County called the "Urbana Country Club." As a youngster, he worked and played that course. While attending Urbana High School, he won the Ohio state high school golf championship, and medaled in the state amateur golf championship, all before entering the U.S. Army at age 18 in 1944 during World War II. Dye first moved to Delray Beach, Florida, with his parents in 1933 and eventually established his own winter residence there. With his brother Andy, he had attended the Asheville School, a boarding school in North Carolina at Asheville. Dye entered the Airborne School at Fort Benning in Georgia to be a paratrooper in the 82nd Airborne Division, but the war ended while he was in training. He was stationed at Fort Bragg in North Carolina where he served the rest of his hitch as greenskeeper on the base golf course. Dye explained,

"I played the golf course at Pinehurst No. 2 for six solid months, and I got to know Mr. Donald Ross...(who) had built the Fort Bragg golf course. He would come over and watch us play golf, and most of the time the captain and colonel hauled me over there. They didn't know who Mr. Ross was, but the other fellow walking with him was JC Penney, and they all knew him."

After Dye's discharge, he relocated to Florida and enrolled at Rollins College in Winter Park, northeast of Orlando, where he met his wife, Alice Holliday O'Neal. They were married in early 1950, and had two sons, Perry and P.B. (Paul Burke).

== Career ==
In the early 1950s, the family moved to Indiana to her hometown of Indianapolis, and Dye sold insurance. Within a few years, he distinguished himself as a million dollar salesman, and was also successful in amateur golf. Dye won the Indiana amateur championship in 1958, following runner-up finishes in 1954 and 1955. At age 31, he qualified for the U.S. Open in 1957 at Inverness Club in Toledo, Ohio, but shot 152 (+12) to miss the cut by two strokes, as did Arnold Palmer; seventeen-year-old amateur Jack Nicklaus was eight strokes behind them at 160.

=== Design career ===
Dye made the decision to become a golf course designer in his mid-30s. Alice supported his career change and became partner in the new venture. In 1961, the couple visited and talked to noted golf architect Bill Diddle, who lived nearby. He warned them about the economic uncertainty of the profession, but they persisted. The first design from Dye and his wife was the nine-hole El Dorado course south of Indianapolis, which crossed a creek thirteen times. Those nine holes are now incorporated into the Royal Oak course at Dye's Walk Country Club. Their first 18-hole course was created during 1962 in Indianapolis and named Heather Hills, now known as Maple Creek Golf & Country Club.

Dye designed the Radrick Farms Golf Course for the University of Michigan in 1962, but the course did not open until 1965. At the time, he was using the design style of Trent Jones, but after seeing the work of Alister MacKenzie, who designed the 1931 Michigan course, Dye decided to incorporate features from two greens into his next project. Dye visited Scotland in 1963 and made a thorough study of its classic courses. The Scottish use of pot bunkers, bulkheads constructed of wood, and diminutive greens influenced his subsequent designs.

Dye's first well-known course was Crooked Stick Golf Club in Carmel, Indiana, north of Indianapolis, begun in 1964. It hosted the PGA Championship in 1991, won by ninth alternate John Daly. In 1967, he designed The Golf Club near Columbus, Ohio, where he solicited input from 27-year-old Jack Nicklaus, an area local who won his seventh major (of 18) that year. The two worked together to design the acclaimed Harbour Town Golf Links in South Carolina, opened in 1969, the site of an annual PGA Tour event ever since. Nicklaus credits Dye with significant influence on his own approach to golf course design. Also in 1969, Dye designed his first course in Florida called Delray Dunes. In 1970, he designed Martingham Golf Course in St. Michaels, Maryland, now known as Harbourtowne Resort. The owners of the project went bankrupt and Dye went unpaid; the course was eventually finished, however, and had many of Dye's signature course characteristics such as deep bunkers, small greens, short challenging par fours, and railroad ties. In 2015, the property was purchased by Richard D. Cohen who has entered into an agreement with Dye to update and redesign the course. The new owner agreed to pay the funds that were not paid during the original design.

In 1986, Dye also designed a course in the Italian province of Brescia, near Lake Iseo, the Franciacorta Golf Club, recognized today as a wine golf course. Dye is considered to be one of the most influential course architects in the world. His designs are known for distinctive features, including small greens and the use of railroad ties to hold bunkers. His design for the Brickyard Crossing golf course at the Indianapolis Motor Speedway utilized the dismantled outer retaining wall from the race track. He is known for designing the "world's most terrifying tee shot," the par-3 17th hole of the Stadium Course at TPC at Sawgrass in Ponte Vedra Beach, Florida. Known as the "Island Green," it gained wide notice 44 years ago in 1982, during the first Players Championship at the new course. Dye's designs have been credited with returning short and medium length par fours to golf. Many of the best young golf architects have "pushed dirt" for Pete, including Bill Coore, Tom Doak, John Harbottle, Butch Laporte, Tim Liddy, Scott Poole, David Postlewaite, Lee Schmidt, Keith Sparkman, Jim Urbina, Bobby Weed, Rod Whitman, and Abe Wilson.

== Death ==
In the last years of his life, Dye suffered from Alzheimer's disease. Dye died on January 9, 2020.

== Awards and honors ==
- In 1995, the American Society of Golf Course Architects bestowed the Donald Ross Award on Dye
- In 2003, Dye received the Old Tom Morris Award from the Golf Course Superintendents Association of America, their highest honor
- In 2004, he was the recipient of the PGA Distinguished Service Award, the highest annual honor of the PGA of America, which recognizes individuals who display leadership and humanitarian qualities, including integrity, sportsmanship and enthusiasm for the game of golf
- In 2005, Dye became the sixth recipient of the PGA Tour Lifetime Achievement Award
- Dye was named Architect of the Year by Golf World magazine
- Dye was awarded a Doctor of Landscape Architecture degree from Purdue University
- Dye received Indiana's Sagamore of the Wabash award
- Late in his career, he became an honorary member of the Indiana PGA. It was the 11th award honor he had received over the course of his career
- In 2008, he was inducted into the World Golf Hall of Fame in the Lifetime Achievement category

== Courses designed ==
Dye is credited with designing more than 200 courses internationally during his lifetime.
