= Cog Hill Golf & Country Club =

Golf course and country club in Illinois, US

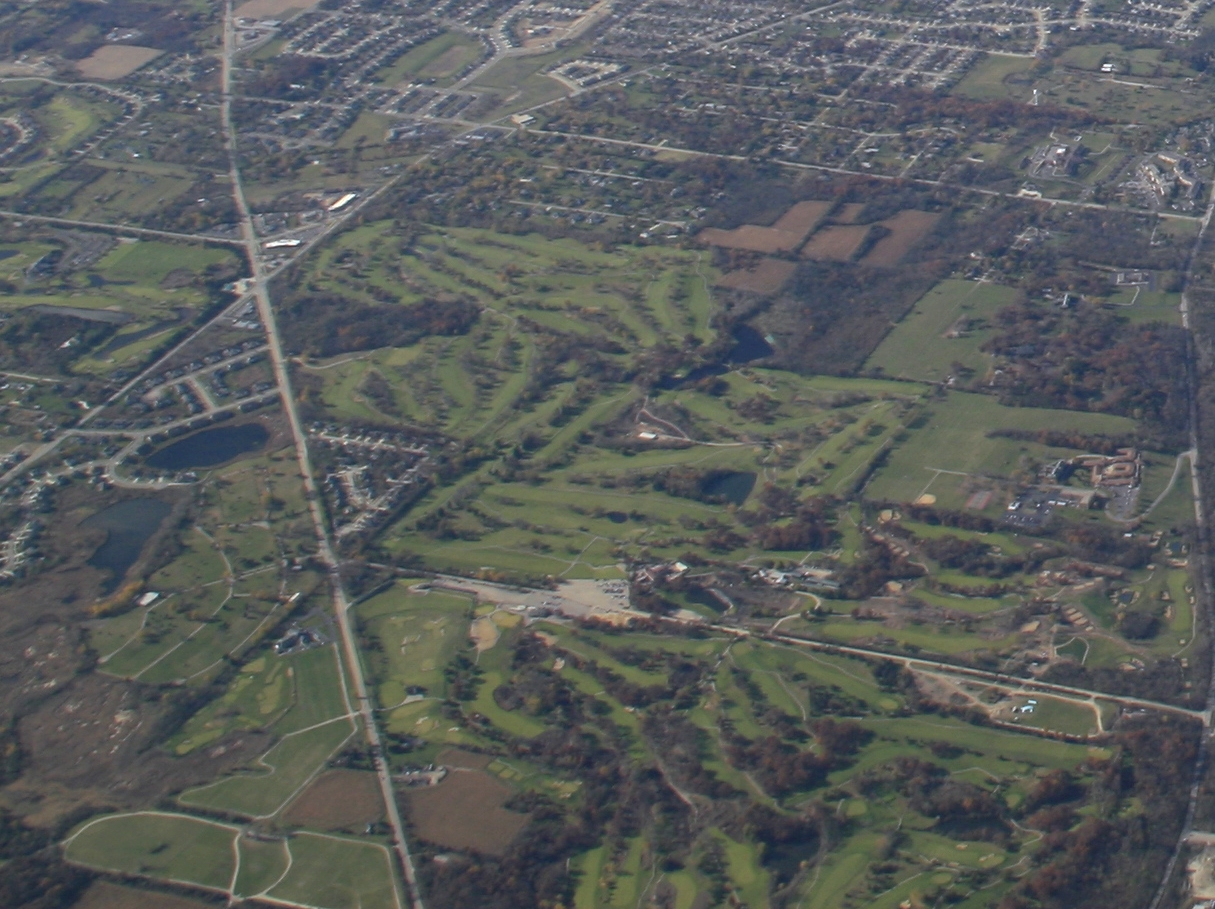
- Cog Hill

- Location within the United States Location within Illinois
- 41.676693°N 87.951651°W

Club information
- Location: Palos Park, Illinois, U.S.
- Established: 1927
- Type: Public
- Owner: Jemsek Golf
- Operator: Jemsek Golf
- Tota holes: 72
- Tournaments: BMW Championship, 2007, 2009–11; Western Open, 1991–2006
- Website: Cog Hill Golf & Country Club

Course #1 Blue
- Par: 71
- Length: 6,282 yards (5,744 m)
- Course rating: 69.7

Course #2 Ravines
- Par: 72
- Length: 6,608 yards (6,042 m)
- Course rating: 71.1

Course #3 Red
- Par: 72
- Length: 6,402 yards (5,854 m)
- Course rating: 69.7

Course #4 Dubsdread
- Designed by: Dick Wilson, Joe Lee
- Par: 71
- Length: 7,554
- Course rating: 77.8
- Course record: 62 (Tiger Woods, September 13, 2009)

Cog Hill Golf & Country Club is a public golf course and country club located in Palos Park, Illinois, 30 miles (48 km) southwest of Chicago. Cog Hill hosted the PGA Tour's BMW Championship from 2009 to 2011 on its championship course Dubsdread, as well as 16 times when the tournament was known as the Western Open.

== History ==
Three brothers moved to the Chicago area in 1920. John W., Martin J., and Bert Coghill bought the McLaughlin farm on the west side of Palos Park, Illinois in 1926 to build a golf club. They then hired David McIntosh, who owned Oak Hills, to build them a golf course. Cog Hill Course #1 opened on the Fourth of July weekend in 1927. Reservations for golf were taken at Chicago's Boston Store, which, at that time, was one of the downtown Chicago's leading department stores. The Chicago and Joliet Electric Railway ran from Chicago to Lemont, giving golfers easy access for 25 cents.

The club expanded in 1929 when the three brothers bought another 160 acres (0.65 km^{2}) from the Reed family on the east side of Parker Road. Course #2 was designed and built by David McIntosh and Bert Coghill. It was opened in the fall of 1929, within days of the Wall Street crash of 1929. Even during the tough twelve years of the Great Depression, Cog Hill was able to prosper. In 1951, Joe Jemsek bought Cog Hill. Course #3 was added in 1963 and Dubsdread was completed in 1964.

The Western Golf Association awarded the Western Open to Cog Hill in 1991. It changed its name to the BMW Championship in 2007. Tiger Woods shot a course record 9-under 62 on Dubsdread in 2009. Woods has won the tournament at Cog Hill five times.

Cog Hill is now run and operated by Jemsek Golf Inc.

== Tournaments ==
Major championships held at Cog Hill's Dubsdread course.

=== BMW Championship ===
Year	Player	Country	Score	To Par	Margin	Earnings ($)
2011	Justin Rose	England	63-68-69-71=271	−13	2	1,440,000
2010	Dustin Johnson	United States	68-70-68-69=275	−9	1	1,350,000
2009	Tiger Woods	United States	68-67-62-68=265	−19	8	1,350,000
2007	Tiger Woods	United States	67-67-65-63=262	−22	2	1,260,000

=== Western Open ===
Year	Player	Country	Score	To Par	Margin	Earnings ($)
2006	Trevor Immelman	South Africa	69-66-69-67=271	−13	2	900,000
2005	Jim Furyk	United States	64-70-67-69=270	−14	2	900,000
2004	Stephen Ames	Canada	67-73-64-70=274	−10	2	864,000
2003	Tiger Woods	United States	63-70-65-69=267	−21	5	810,000
2002	Jerry Kelly	United States	67-69-68-65=269	−19	2	720,000
2001	Scott Hoch	United States	69-68-66-64=267	−21	1	648,000
2000	Robert Allenby	Australia	69-69-68-68=274	−14	0	540,000
1999	Tiger Woods	United States	68-66-68-71=273	−15	3	450,000
1998	Joe Durant	United States	68-67-70-66=271	−17	2	396,000
1997	Tiger Woods	United States	67-72-68-68=275	−13	3	360,000
1996	Steve Stricker	United States	65-69-67-69=270	−18	8	360,000
1995	Billy Mayfair	United States	73-70-69-67=279	−9	1	360,000
1994	Nick Price	Zimbabwe	67-67-72-71=277	−11	1	216,000
1993	Nick Price	Zimbabwe	64-71-67-67=269	−19	5	216,000
1992	Ben Crenshaw	United States	70-72-65-69=276	−12	2	198,000
1991	Russ Cochran	United States	66-72-68-69=275	−13	2	180,000

=== U.S. Amateur Championship ===
Year	Player	Country	Score	Runner-up
1997	Matt Kuchar	United States	2 & 1	Joel Kribel

=== U.S. Men's Amateur Public Links ===
Year	Player	Country	Score	Runner-up
1989	Tim Hobby	United States	4 & 3	Henry Cagigal
1970	Robert Risch	United States	293	Mike Zimmerman

=== U.S. Women's Amateur Public Links ===
Year	Player	Country	Score	Runner-up
1987	Tracy Kerdyk	United States	4 & 3	Pearl Sinn

== Courses ==
=== Course #1 Blue ===
Course #1 is the oldest course at Cog Hill. The Blue course was designed and built in 1927.

Course #1 Blue
Tee	Rating/Slope	1	2	3	4	5	6	7	8	9	Out	10	11	12	13	14	15	16	17	18	In	Total
Black	69.7/118	490	388	414	130	330	480	377	235	410	3257	190	380	340	483	300	412	390	175	355	3025	6282
Blue	68.4/115	475	370	400	128	310	470	360	215	404	3132	175	370	320	473	270	391	376	160	315	2850	5982
White	67.3/112	455	355	380	125	300	460	345	185	400	3005	160	360	311	463	260	374	371	140	300	2739	5744
Forward	65.4/107	430	346	345	95	272	429	316	162	355	2750	150	350	301	453	254	330	345	130	270	2583	5333
Par		5	4	4	3	4	5	4	3	4	36	3	4	4	5	4	4	4	3	4	35	71

=== Course #2 Ravines ===
Course #2 Ravines was designed and built in 1929. Ravines was adjusted for to host the 1997 United States Amateur Championship. Golf Digest rated the course 4-Stars and as one of "America's 100 Best Courses for $100 or Less".

Course #2 Ravines
Tee	Rating/Slope	1	2	3	4	5	6	7	8	9	Out	10	11	12	13	14	15	16	17	18	In	Total
Blue	71.1/125	316	371	540	152	480	384	185	390	520	3338	430	499	369	325	140	454	376	297	380	3270	6608
White	69.4/122	306	345	507	131	450	359	165	380	500	3143	400	467	360	315	135	409	362	287	370	3105	6248
Forward	66.8/116	286	321	478	124	398	272	135	343	400	2756	350	453	350	282	120	386	331	273	361	2906	5662
Par		4	4	5	3	4	4	3	4	5	36	4	5	4	4	3	4	4	4	4	36	72

=== Course #3 Red ===
In 1963 Cog Hill added Course #3.

Course #3 Red
Tee	Rating/Slope	1	2	3	4	5	6	7	8	9	Out	10	11	12	13	14	15	16	17	18	In	Total
Black	69.7/116	268	354	518	133	370	293	352	386	190	2864	360	570	170	416	399	493	200	525	405	3538	6402
Blue	68.6/113	264	340	509	120	360	275	342	376	180	2756	349	545	155	391	389	483	185	515	395	3407	6163
White	67.4/110	247	335	500	110	350	265	330	368	170	2675	335	525	134	381	379	420	158	495	390	3217	5892
Forward	64.3/103	220	330	434	90	314	255	320	363	163	2489	272	415	112	371	271	417	153	386	324	2721	5210
Par		4	4	5	3	4	4	4	4	3	35	4	5	3	4	4	5	3	5	4	37	72

=== Course #4 Dubsdread ===
Dubsdread was designed and built by Joseph L. Lee/Dick Wilson in 1964. It was renovated by Rees Jones in 2007–2008.

Course #4 Dubsdread
Tee	Rating/Slope	1	2	3	4	5	6	7	8	9	Out	10	11	12	13	14	15	16	17	18	In	Total
Black	77.8/151	458	224	443	462	507	240	431	379	613	3757	383	607	216	480	215	523	456	423	494	3797	7554
Gold	75.8/144	442	208	427	427	495	216	399	360	600	3574	369	565	202	446	194	509	419	407	459	3570	7144
Blue	73.9/138	425	182	407	397	479	194	385	341	586	3396	353	547	194	383	184	482	381	399	431	3354	6750
White	71.9/134	407	161	389	367	463	173	363	319	550	3192	336	525	178	371	174	462	362	381	401	3190	6382
Green	70.2/130	385	158	386	348	433	137	304	316	521	2988	333	483	154	368	171	425	359	378	374	3045	6033
Par		4	3	4	4	4	3	4	4	5	35	4	5	3	4	3	5	4	4	4	36	71
