= Bay Hill Club and Lodge =

Private golf club and hotel located in Bay Hill, Florida

- Location within the United States Location within Florida
- Interactive map of Bay Hill Club and Lodge
- 28.458°N 81.511°W

Club information
- Location: Bay Hill, Florida, U.S.
- Elevation: 120 feet (37 m)
- Established: 1961, 65 years ago
- Type: Private
- Tota holes: 27
- Tournaments: Arnold Palmer Invitational (1979–present)
- Website: bayhill.com

Challenger / Champion nines
- Designed by: Dick Wilson
- Par: 72
- Length: 7,381 yards (6,749 m)
- Course rating: 75.2
- Slope rating: 138

Charger nine
- Designed by: Bob Simmons
- Par: 36
- Length: 3,324 yards (3,039 m)
- Course rating: 36.0
- Slope rating: 137

The Bay Hill Club & Lodge is a private golf club and hotel in the southeastern United States, located in Bay Hill, Florida, a suburb southwest of Orlando.

The first 18 holes at Bay Hill (Champion and Challenger nines) were designed by Dick Wilson in 1961, and were built by Bob Simmons. Considered one of Wilson's best works, the course illustrates his typical approach of slightly elevating the putting surfaces to improve visibility and drainage. Simmons designed and built the additional 9 holes (Charger nine) after Wilson's death.

The course covers 270 acres (1.1 km^{2}), and lies between the community of Bay Hill and the Butler Chain of Lakes. There are 27 holes of golf available: the Challenger, Champion and Charger nines. It was owned by Arnold Palmer from 1974 until his death in 2016, and now by his daughter and son-in-law Amy & Roy Saunders. Bay Hill Club & Lodge also offers a 69-room Lodge, 6 guest cottages, the Arnold Palmer Golf Academy and various amenities such as tennis, instructional golf lessons, Spa & Fitness Center, and marina. You must be a member or registered Lodge guest to have access to the golf course and all Club amenities. The Golf Shop is open to the public.

== Arnold Palmer Invitational ==
Since 1979, Bay Hill Club & Lodge has hosted the Arnold Palmer Invitational, a tournament on the PGA Tour. The event is held annually each March.

== Scorecard ==
Challenger / Champion
Tee	Rating/Slope	1	2	3	4	5	6	7	8	9	Out	10	11	12	13	14	15	16	17	18	In	Total
Green	75.2 / 137	461	231	434	561	390	555	199	460	474	3765	400	438	574	370	215	429	511	221	458	3616	7381
Blue	73.6 / 133	438	220	406	491	366	528	184	408	446	3487	383	409	562	356	179	415	490	177	437	3408	6895
Yellow	71.3 / 129	416	200	371	461	350	493	159	371	410	3231	360	396	536	335	161	392	457	166	403	3206	6437
Red	68.4 / 123	380	186	260	434	333	437	135	346	393	2904	334	372	490	314	140	340	399	149	346	2884	5788
SI	Men's	4	18	14	10	8	2	16	6	12		13	9	3	1	17	5	7	15	11
Par		4	3	4	5	4	5	3	4	4	36	4	4	5	4	3	4	5	3	4	36	72
SI	Ladies'	6	16	14	10	8	2	18	12	4		15	7	1	11	17	9	5	3	13
Red	74.5 / 136	380	186	260	434	333	437	135	346	393	2904	334	372	490	314	140	340	399	149	346	2884	5788
White	70.8 / 125	360	151	238	392	317	398	105	264	362	2587	293	322	435	256	123	320	350	148	309	2556	5143
