= Hole-in-the-Wall Golf Club =

Golf facility in Naples, Florida

Hole In The Wall Golf Club
- Location within Florida
- 26.188099°N 81.790792°W

Club information
- Established: 1958
- Type: Private
- Tota holes: 18
- Website: www.holeinthewallgolf.org
- Designed by: Dick Wilson, Ron Forse
- Par: 72
- Length: 6,237 yards (5,703 m)
- Course rating: 70.6
- Slope rating: 128

The Hole In The Wall Golf Club is an 18-hole private golf facility in Naples, Florida.

== Course ==
The course was originally designed in 1957 by Dick Wilson, the well-known golf course architect. It opened in January 1958. It had a length of about 6,200 yards (5,700 m) and 103 bunkers.

The course was renovated in 2009 and the number of bunkers was increased to 109. The material removed to dig the lake was used to "build up" the entire course to improve grass and course maintenance. The new longer course measures 6565 yards, has a course rating of 71.8 and a slope of 130. The regular course is 6230 yards, has a course rating of 70.0 and a slope of 128.

== Conservation ==
The club's property includes nearly 50 acres (20 ha) of wetland set aside for wildlife conservation, and is fully certified as an Audubon Cooperative Sanctuary. The conservation land includes cypress swamps and woods, and 10 acres (4.0 ha) of lakes. The shorelines have been landscaped with aquatic plantings to reduce erosion and provide habitat. Animal life includes gray fox, bobcat and cypress fox squirrel. The University of Florida uses it as a research site for the cypress fox squirrel. Birdlife includes snowy egrets and great egrets, wood storks, tricolored herons, great blue herons, little blue herons, bald eagles and pileated woodpeckers.
