= American Society of Golf Course Architects =

Professional organization of golf course designers in America

- American Society of Golf Course Architects logo
- Founded: 1946
- Founders: William P. Bell, Robert White, W.B. Langford, Donald Ross, Robert Bruce Harris, Stanley Thompson, William F. Gordon, Robert Trent Jones Sr., William Diddel, and J.B. McGovern, Perry Maxwell, Jack Daray and Robert "Red" Lawrence.
- Location: Brookfield, Wisconsin
- Website: http://www.asgca.org

The American Society of Golf Course Architects (abbreviated as ASGCA) is a professional organization of golf course designers in America. Founded in 1946, its members are actively involved in the design of new courses and the renovation of existing courses in the United States and Canada. One of its founders was noted golf course architect Robert White. The abbreviation is typically referenced at the end of a person's name when documenting or discussing golf course architecture.

== About ASGCA ==
Founded in 1946, the American Society of Golf Course Architects (ASGCA) is the oldest professional organization of golf course designers in America.

All ASGCA members have completed of a minimum of five major golf course projects and are peer-reviewed by the ASGCA membership.

Over the past several years ASGCA has published three editions of An Environmental Approach to Golf Course Development to help educate permitting boards, town councils, developers, media, and the general public about the positive role golf courses can play in preserving the environment. Released in 2008, the current, third edition highlights 18 case studies that showcase success stories dealing with a variety of sensitive habitats.

== History ==
This excerpt from the 1947 ASGCA minutes confirms ASGCA and the golf industry have faced some of the same issues for decades. In the following, Mr. Richard Tufts of Pinehurst addresses the 10 assembled charter members regarding the work of the "Implements and Balls Committee" of the USGA:

"This problem primarily concerns the flight of the golf ball, of course, which is why I thought you as golf course architects would be interested in it essentially. It is something the USGA has been working on for a good many years. Mr. Fownes, who is president here (Pinehurst), was very active as chairman of this committee when he held that position prior to his service as President of the USGA, and he did a great deal of work on this whole problem of the golf ball. I've been very much interested in it since I've been Chairman of the committee. We feel that a golf course is designed for a certain type of shot to the green, and that as you increase the length of the tee shot, you throw the golf course all out of scale. Therefore, it spoils the pleasure of the play to have this continual increase in the flight of the ball. We feel that the question involves not only the ball but also the equipment of the game; that possibly the shaft had something to do with the increased length of the ball. We've done a lot of work in Chicago with our machine there in testing the ball. Since our tests first started back in 1942 we haven't observed much increase in the flight of the ball, it's been pretty constant. The manufacturers say pretty much the same thing: that they haven't changed the ball very much, and in their opinions it hasn't increased.

"However, that doesn't mean that it might not increase in the future. It's quite possible that improvements to the present ball have just about reached 100 percent efficiency under the present method of manufacture, but it's quite possible that there might be improvements in plastics, or other material, that would greatly increase the flight of the present ball. We feel that it would be a very serious thing for the game, and we'd like the support of your association in maintaining the present ball; helping us with this...

"At the conclusion of Mr. Tuft's speech, Mr. Thompson made a motion that the Society send a resolution to the USGA to the effect that as a body the members pledge their support to the rules and regulations adopted by the USGA, and that the Society recognizes the USGA as the ruling body of golf in the United States. Mr. Bell seconded the motion and it passed unanimously...

"The Society then appointed a committee of two to work on this resolution: Mr. Donald J. Ross and Mr. Robert Trent Jones. Mr. Jones was appointed delegate to the USGA's annual meeting."

== Membership ==
Membership in ASGCA signifies that an architect is a qualified profession golf course architect. Every ASGCA member must complete a two-year application process and prove that they have acquired sound technical training, have no less than eight years of practical experience in golf course architecture, have designed at least five 18-hole golf course equivalents and is recognized by other ASGCA members as a competent professional golf course architect.

=== Peer Review ===
ASGCA members are very involved in the review of each potential member's application. Four of the five representative courses submitted on an application are evaluated in person by an ASGCA member. The member studies plans of the course, interviews construction personnel, club management and either walks or plays the course with the applicant.

Each applicant must also be sponsored by three ASGCA members. The sponsors are members who can personally vouch for the character, professional integrity and high level of applied architecture skill of the applicant.

=== Code of Ethics ===
In addition, ASGCA members abide by standards of professional practice and a stringent code of ethics. The code of ethics set standards for the golf course architect's role in contract negotiations and their responsibilities to the client. Many public agencies and entities have recognized that the ASGCA membership constitutes the highest professional standards in golf course design.

=== Description of Membership ===
Membership in the American Society of Golf Course Architects is granted to individuals involved in golf course design and planning. Members are typically experienced in areas such as course architecture, preparation of design specifications, and oversight of course development projects. They may also provide consultation on various aspects of golf course planning and construction for clients.

Each member of the American Society of Golf Course Architects is engaged primarily in golf course architecture, and their qualifications have satisfied the Board of Governors in all respects.

== Past and Present Presidents ==
Term Year	President	Term Year	President
1947	Robert Bruce & Donald Ross	1981-1982	Richard Nugent
1948-1949	Robert Bruce Harris	1982-1983	Arthur Jack Snyder
1949-1950	Stanley Thompson	1983-1984	Ted Robinson
1950-1951	Robert Trent Jones	1984-1985	Mike Hurdzan
1951-1952	William B. Langford	1985-1986	John Watson
1952-1953	William P. Bell	1986-1987	Kenneth K. Killian
1953-1954	William F. Gordon	1987-1988	Roger Rulewich
1954-1955	William H. Diddel	1989-1990	Robert Trent Jones Jr.
1955-1956	James G. Harrison	1990-1991	Dan Maples
1956-1957	Robert F. Lawrence	1991-1992	Tom Clark
1957-1958	William F. Bell	1992-1993	Arthur Hills
1958-1959	Howard Watson	1993-1994	Jerry Matthews
1959-1960	David W. Gordon	1994-1995	Don Knott
1960-1961	J. Press Maxwell	1995-1996	Jeffrey Brauer
1961-1962	C.E. Robinson	1996-1997	Denis Griffiths
1962-1963	Ralph Plummer	1997-1998	Alice Dye
1963-1964	William B. Langford	1998-1999	Bob Lohmann
1964-1965	Robert F. Lawrence	1999-2000	John Lafoy
1965-1966	William Diddel	2000-2001	Brian Ault
1966-1967	Floyd Farley	2001-2002	Damian Pascuzzo
1967-1968	William F. Gordon	2002-2003	Jay Morrish
1968-1969	Fred Garbin	2003-2004	Clyde Johnston
1969-1970	James G. Harrison	2004-2005	Bill Love
1970-1971	E. Lawrence Packard	2005-2006	Tom Marzolf
1971-1972	C.E. Robinson	2006-2007	Greg Muirhead
1972-1973	Frank Duane	2007-2008	Steve Forrest
1973-1974	Ellis Maples	2008-2009	Bruch Charlton
1974-1975	Robert Muir Graves	2009-2010	Doug Carrick
1975-1976	Geoffrey Cornish	2010-2011	Erik Larsen
1976-1977	Edwin B. Seay	2011-2012	Rick Phelps
1977-1978	William Amick	2012-2013	Bob Cupp
1978-1979	Rees Jones	2013-2014	Rick Robbins
1979-1980	Jack Kidwell	2014-2015	Lee Schmidt
1980-1981	Richard Phelps	2015-2016	Steve Smyers

== Donald Ross Award Winners ==
The Donald Ross Award, ASGCA's highest honor, is presented annually to an individual who has made significant and lasting contributions to the profession of golf course architecture.

Year	Recipient	Occupation	Year	Recipient	Occupation
1976	Robert Trent Jones	ASGCA Founding Member	1995	Pete Dye	Golf Course Architect
1977	Herbert Warren Wind	Golf Digest Columnist; Author	1996	Ron Whitten	Golf Writer
1978	Herb and Joe Graffis	Founders, National Golf Foundation	1997	Gene Sarazen	Professional Golfer
1979	Joe Dey	Former executive director of the USGA	1998	Judy Bell	President, USGA
1980	Gerald Micklem	Former captain, Royal and Ancient	1999	Arnold Palmer	Professional Golfer
1981	James Rhodes	Governor of Ohio	2000	Jaime Ortiz-Patiño	Owner and President, Valderrama Golf Club
1982	Geoffrey Cornish	Golf course architect; historian	2001	Jack Nicklaus	Professional Golfer; Golf Course Architect
1983	Al Radko	Former director, USGA Green Section	2002	Byron Nelson	Professional Golfer
1984	Dinah Shore	Sponsor of Women's Golf Tournaments	2003	Bill Campbell	President, USGA; Captain, Royal & Ancient Golf Club
1985	Peter Dobereiner	London Observer columnist; author	2004	Thomas Cousins	Philanthropist; Urban Golf Developer
1986	Deane Beman	PGA Tour commissioner	2005	John Singleton	Irrigation Pioneer
1987	Charles Price	World Golf Magazine	2006	Jim Awtrey	CEO, PGA of America
1988	Frank Hannigan	Executive director, USGA	2007	Dr. Michael Hurdzan	Golf Course Architect
1989	Dick Taylor	Editor, World Golf Magazine	2008	George Peper	Golf Writer
1990	John Zoller	Former executive director, No. California Golf Association	2009	Ron Dodson	Sustainable Golf Advocate
1991	Michael Bonallack	Secretary, Royal and Ancient (St. Andrews)	2010	Tim Finchem	PGA Tour Commissioner
1992	Paul Fullmer	ASGCA Executive Secretary	2011	James Dodson	Golf Writer Editor
1993	Brent Wadsworth	Golf Course Builder	2012	Bill Kubly	Golf Course Builder
1994	James R. Watson	Agronomist	2013	Rees Jones	Golf Course Architect

== See also ==
- Category:Golf clubs and courses by designer
- Landscape design
- Landscape architecture
