= Lauri Merten =

American professional golfer (born 1960)

Personal information
- Nationality: United States
- Born: July 6, 1960 (age 66) Waukesha, Wisconsin, U.S.

Career
- Sport: Golf
- College: Arizona State University
- Turned professional: 1983
- Former tour: LPGA Tour (1983–1997)
- Professional wins: 3

Number of wins by tour
- LPGA Tour: 3

Best results in LPGA major championships (wins: 1)
- Chevron Championship: T13: 1985
- Women's PGA C'ship: 2nd: 1993
- U.S. Women's Open: Won: 1993
- du Maurier Classic: T30: 1993

Lauri Merten (born July 6, 1960) is an American professional golfer. She also competed under the names Lauri Peterson (1983–1987) and Lauri Merten-Peterson (1988).

Merten was born in Waukesha, Wisconsin. She attended Arizona State University and joined the LPGA Tour in 1983.

Merten's three wins on the LPGA Tour came at the 1983 Rail Charity Golf Classic, the 1984 Jamie Farr Toledo Classic and the 1993 U.S. Women's Open, which is one of the LPGA's major championships.

When she retired, Merten claimed burnout was the cause; Sports Illustrated speculated that another factor may have been unwanted attention surrounding the then-recent murder conviction of her brother-in-law Thomas Capano.

== Professional wins ==
=== LPGA Tour wins (3) ===
Legend
LPGA Tour major championships (1)
Other LPGA Tour (2)

No.	Date	Tournament	Winning score	Margin of victory	Runner(s)-up
1	Sep 5, 1983	Rail Charity Golf Classic	−6 (68-70-72=210)	Playoff	(Canada) Judy Ellis
2	Jul 8, 1984	Jamie Farr Toledo Classic	−10 (68-72-65-73=278)	2 strokes	(United States) Nancy Lopez
3	Jul 25, 1993	U.S. Women's Open	−8 (71-71-70-68=280)	1 stroke	(Sweden) Helen Alfredsson (United States) Donna Andrews

LPGA Tour playoff record (1–0)

No.	Year	Tournament	Opponent	Result
1	1983	Rail Charity Golf Classic	(Canada) Judy Ellis	Won with par on first extra hole

== Major championships ==
=== Wins (1) ===
Year	Championship	Winning score	Margin	Runners-up
1993	U.S. Women's Open	−8 (71-71-70-68=280)	1 stroke	(Sweden) Helen Alfredsson, (United States) Donna Andrews

=== Results timeline ===
Tournament	1982	1983	1984	1985	1986	1987	1988	1989
Nabisco Dinah Shore	–		T24	T13	T42	T33	T25	68
LPGA Championship		T44	CUT	CUT	T15	CUT	CUT	T14
U.S. Women's Open	T51		T17	CUT		T55		
du Maurier Classic		CUT	CUT	T58	T63	T53	T35	T36

Tournament	1990	1991	1992	1993	1994	1995	1996	1997
Nabisco Dinah Shore	T55	48	CUT	T71	T17	T37	CUT	CUT
LPGA Championship	T43	CUT	CUT	2	T46	CUT	CUT	
U.S. Women's Open				1	T12	CUT	CUT	
du Maurier Classic	T65	T44	T50	T30	T64	CUT		

Win
Top 10
Did not play

CUT = missed the half-way cut.
T = tied

=== Summary ===
Tournament	Wins	2nd	3rd	Top-5	Top-10	Top-25	Events	Cuts made
Nabisco Dinah Shore	0	0	0	0	0	4	14	11
LPGA Championship	0	1	0	1	1	3	14	6
U.S. Women's Open	1	0	0	1	1	3	8	5
du Maurier Classic	0	0	0	8	0	0	13	10
Totals	1	1	0	2	2	10	49	32

- Most consecutive cuts made – 10 (1992 du Maurier Classic – 1995 Nabisco)
- Longest streak of top-10s – 2 (1993 LPGA – 1993 U.S. Open)
