= Dick Wilson (golf course architect) =

American golf course architect (1904–1965)

Louis Sibbett "Dick" Wilson
- Born: Louis Sibbett Wilson; 1904; Philadelphia, Pennsylvania, United States
- Died: July 5, 1965 (aged 60–61)
- Occupation: Golf course architect

Louis Sibbett "Dick" Wilson (1904 – July 5, 1965) was an American golf course architect, who designed over sixty courses. Several of these still have a high reputation. He was known for his technique of elevating the greens when designing courses in relatively flat terrain, and for using ponds and bunkers to emphasize the aerial approach.

== Early years ==
Wilson was born in 1904 in Philadelphia, Pennsylvania, where his father was a contractor. He worked as a water boy on construction of the Merion Golf Course in Philadelphia. Wilson was admitted to the University of Vermont on a football scholarship. After leaving university he joined the team of Howard C. Toomey and William S. Flynn of Philadelphia. In 1931 he supervised construction when Toomey and Flynn undertook a complete overhaul of the Shinnecock Hills Golf Club. With Toomey and Flynn he also worked on the course for the Cleveland Country Club, two golf courses at the Boca Raton Resort in Boca Raton, Florida, the Country Club in Brookline, Massachusetts, and Springdale, outside Princeton, among others. During the Great Depression, Wilson got a job managing Delray Beach Golf Club. He was a course superintendent for a time, then during World War II (1939–1945) he worked on airfield camouflage.

== Course architect ==
After the war Wilson became a golf course designer in his own right. Business was slow at first, but by 1952 it had picked up sufficiently for Wilson to take on an associate, Joe Lee, a 30-year-old graduate of the University of Miami. Wilson's style included broad fairways and large greens. He gave his bunkers a curvelinear form. In the flat country of Florida he developed a style in which putting surfaces were slightly raised, making them more visible and also helping with drainage. The axis of the green would be set at a 30% – 45% diagonal to the fairway, with a large bunker guarding the approach. Wilson's courses typically included various artificial lakes, largely to provide fill for the elevated tees and greens, but also for the sake of adding challenge.

The West Palm Beach Golf Course (1947) is an early example of Wilson's work, a championship course with rolling terrain and elevated greens. In 1954 the Deepdale Golf Club bought the W.R. Grace estate on Long Island and had a new course designed by Wilson. By 1959, when he designed the course for the Cypress Lake Country Club, he was at the peak of his career. He was known for his renovation of the Seminole Golf Club course in Juno Beach, Florida, updating Donald Ross's scratchy bunkers and giving them a more modern curvelinear form, as well as for his course design for the Hole In The Wall Golf Club in Naples, Florida.

In 1960 Wilson did some work for the Metropolitan Golf Club in Melbourne, Australia. In 1960 land had been taken from the club's course for school development. Using adjoining land, Wilson designed a set of replacement holes that have now completely blended in with the original. Wilson and Joe Lee designed the 18-hole course for the private Lagunita Country Club in El Hatillo Municipality, Venezuela, a relatively prosperous part of Caracas. The course, part of a real estate development, opened in 1964.

Wilson died in 1965 at the age of 61. Arnold Palmer purchased Bay Hill in 1976. The PGA of America moved PGA National Golf Club to a new location in 1981. Donald Trump purchased Doral in 2012.

== Notable courses ==
Wilson designed or renovated at least sixty courses during his career, several of which are still highly regarded. Some of Wilson's best courses, many of the later ones built in partnership with Joe Lee, included:

- NCR South Course, Kettering, Ohio (1954)
- Westmoreland Country Club, Export, Pennsylvania (1954)
- Meadow Brook Club, Jericho, New York (1955)
- Hole-in-the-Wall, Naples, Florida (1958)
- Royal Montreal, L'Île-Bizard, Quebec, Canada (1959)
- Coldstream, Cincinnati, Ohio (1960)
- Laurel Valley, Ligonier, Pennsylvania (1960)
- Bay Hill, Orlando, Florida (1961)
- Pine Tree, Boynton Beach, Florida (1962)
- TPC Blue Monster at Doral, Doral, Florida (1962)
- The Greenbrier Lakeside, White Sulphur Springs, West Virginia (1962)
- Royal Oaks Resort & Golf Club, Titusville, Florida (1963)
- PGA National Golf Club, East Course, Palm Beach Gardens, Florida (1964)
- Cog-Hill #4 "Dubsdread", Chicago (1964)
- La Costa, Carlsbad, California (1964)
- Bidermann, Wilmington, Delaware (1965)
- The Bedens Brook Club, Skillman, New Jersey (1965)
- Mystery Valley Golf Course, Lithonia, Georgia (1966)
