= Alice Dye =

American golfer and golf course designer (1927–2019)

- Born: Alice Holliday O'Neal; February 19, 1927; Indianapolis, Indiana, U.S.
- Died: February 1, 2019 (aged 91); Gulf Stream, Florida, U.S.
- Education: Rollins College
- Occupations: Amateur golfer Golf course designer
- Spouse: Paul "Pete" Dye, Jr. (m. 1950–2019)
- Children: 2

Alice Dye (February 19, 1927 – February 1, 2019) was an American amateur golfer and golf course designer. She was known as the "First Lady" of golf architecture in the United States.

== Early life ==
Born Alice Holliday O'Neal in Indianapolis, Indiana, she began playing golf at a young age as a result of her father's influence, winning eleven Indianapolis Women's City titles. She graduated from Shortridge High School, and in 1946 won the first of her nine Indiana Women's Golf Association Amateur Championships.

While a student at Rollins College in Winter Park, Florida, she was captain of the golf team. At college she met Paul "Pete" Dye Jr. following his discharge from World War II military service. In 1948, she graduated with a B.S. degree.

== Career ==
In 1950, she married Pete Dye and changed her name to Alice Dye. The couple partnered to form Dye Designs, a firm specializing in golf-course designs. The firm is credited with creating over 100 golf courses over the world. They formed one of the top design teams of American golf courses, famous for their design of the TPC at Sawgrass (it was Alice who came up with the idea of the Island Green, the signature 17th hole at Sawgrass' Stadium Course) and for being the first firm in America to introduce design elements for golf courses used in Scotland. She became the first woman president of the American Society of Golf Course Architects, and the first to serve as an independent director of Professional Golfers' Association of America (PGA). Another of Alice's significant contributions was shortening the yardage for women in the golf designs, making them more accessible to the players.

Dye was also an accomplished golfer. She won the 1968 North and South Women's Amateur and was a member of the 1970 United States Curtis Cup team. Dye also won the 1978 and 1979 U.S. Senior Women's Amateur as well as two Canadian Women's Senior Championships.

Dye was a member of the USGA Women's Committee, the LPGA Advisory Council, and a member of the Board of Directors of the Women's Western Amateur. She and her husband also established a golf training program at Purdue University.

== Personal life ==
In 1950, she married Pete Dye. They had two sons: Perry and P.B. (Paul Burke).

In 2019, Alice Dye died at the age of 91 while living in Gulf Stream, Florida.

== Awards and honors ==
- In 1976, Alice Dye was inducted into the Indiana Golf Hall of Fame.
- During her career the Board of Directors of the Women's Western Amateur honored her with their Woman of Distinction Award.
- In 2004, was voted the PGA's First Lady of Golf Award.

== Amateur wins ==
- 1968 North and South Women's Amateur
- 1978 U.S. Senior Women's Amateur
- 1979 U.S. Senior Women's Amateur
- 1983 Canadian Women's Senior Championship
- 1984 Canadian Women's Senior Championship

== Team appearances ==
Amateur

- Curtis Cup (representing the United States): 1970 (winners)

== Bibliography ==
- 2004, From Birdies to Bunkers: Discover How Golf Can Bring Love, Humor and Success into Your Life (with Mark Shaw), foreword by Nancy Lopez
