= 1991 PGA Championship =

Golf tournament held in 1991

Tournament information
- Dates: August 8–11, 1991
- Location: Carmel, Indiana; 39.948°N 86.194°W
- Course: Crooked Stick Golf Club
- Organized by: PGA of America
- Tour: PGA Tour

Statistics
- Par: 72
- Length: 7,289 yards (6,665 m)
- Field: 151 players, 77 after cut
- Cut: 147 (+3)
- Prize fund: $1.35 million
- Winner's share: $230,000

Champion
- (United States) John Daly
- 276 (−12)

Location map
- Location in the United States Location in Indiana

The 1991 PGA Championship was the 73rd PGA Championship, held August 8–11 at Crooked Stick Golf Club in Carmel, Indiana, a suburb north of Indianapolis. John Daly won the first of his two major titles, three strokes ahead of runner-up Bruce Lietzke.

Daly, age 25, was the ninth alternate and only got into the field after several others pulled out of the tournament. Nick Price withdrew for the birth of his first child and Daly hired his caddy, Jeff "Squeaky" Medlin. Daly's outgoing personality and "grip it and rip it" style of play made him an instant fan favorite. The PGA Championship was also his first PGA Tour victory.

A spectator, Thomas Weaver, died after being struck by lightning during a weather delay in the first round. It was the second fatality at a major championship in 1991. Two months earlier at the U.S. Open in Minnesota, six people were hit by lightning with one fatality. Daly donated $30,000 to Weaver's family for a college fund. Both daughters went on to graduate from college and one is now a doctor.

== Course layout ==
Hole	1	2	3	4	5	6	7	8	9	Out	10	11	12	13	14	15	16	17	18	In	Total
Yards	343	432	196	457	600	195	441	438	525	3,627	453	533	395	180	468	507	469	212	445	3,662	7,289
Par	4	4	3	4	5	3	4	4	5	36	4	5	4	3	4	5	4	3	4	36	72

== Round summaries ==
=== First round ===
Thursday, August 8, 1991

Kenny Knox shot an opening round 67 to take the 18-hole lead alongside reigning Masters champion Ian Woosnam.

Place	Player	Score	To par
T1	(United States) Kenny Knox	67	−5
T1	(Wales) Ian Woosnam	67	−5
T3	(United States) Ken Green	68	−4
T3	(United States) Bruce Lietzke	68	−4
T3	(Scotland) Sandy Lyle	68	−4
T3	(United States) Tom Sieckmann	68	−4
T3	(United States) Craig Stadler	68	−4
T8	(United States) Billy Ray Brown	69	−3
T8	(United States) John Daly	69	−3
T8	(United States) Raymond Floyd	69	−3
T8	(United States) Jim Hallet	69	−3
T8	(United States) Andrew Magee	69	−3
T8	(United States) Tom Purtzer	69	−3

=== Second round ===
Friday, August 9, 1991

Place	Player	Score	To par
1	(United States) John Daly	69-67=136	−8
2	(United States) Bruce Lietzke	68-69=137	−7
3	(United States) Kenny Knox	67-71=138	−6
T4	(England) Nick Faldo	70-69=139	−5
T4	(United States) Craig Stadler	68-71=139	−5
T4	(Wales) Ian Woosnam	67-72=139	−5
7	(United States) Fred Funk	71-69=140	−4
T8	(United States) Fred Couples	74-67=141	−3
T8	(United States) Ken Green	68-73=141	−3
T8	(United States) Gil Morgan	70-71=141	−3
T8	(United States) Hal Sutton	74-67=141	−3
T8	(United States) Howard Twitty	70-71=141	−3

=== Third round ===
Saturday, August 10, 1991

Place	Player	Score	To par
1	(United States) John Daly	69-67-69=205	−11
T2	(United States) Kenny Knox	67-71-70=208	−8
T2	(United States) Craig Stadler	68-71-69=208	−8
4	(United States) Bruce Lietzke	68-69-72=209	−7
T5	(England) Nick Faldo	70-69-71=210	−6
T5	(United States) Bob Gilder	73-70-67=210	−6
T5	(United States) Andrew Magee	69-73-68=210	−6
T8	(United States) Fred Funk	71-69-72=212	−4
T8	(United States) Ken Green	68-73-71=212	−4
T8	(United States) John Huston	70-72-70=212	−4

=== Final round ===
Sunday, August 11, 1991

Place	Player	Score	To par	Money ($)
1	(United States) John Daly	69-67-69-71=276	−12	230,000
2	(United States) Bruce Lietzke	68-69-72-70=279	−9	140,000
3	(United States) Jim Gallagher Jr.	70-72-72-67=281	−7	95,000
4	(United States) Kenny Knox	67-71-70-74=282	−6	75,000
T5	(United States) Bob Gilder	73-70-67-73=283	−5	60,000
T5	(England) Steven Richardson	70-72-72-69=283	−5	60,000
T7	(Northern Ireland) David Feherty	71-74-71-68=284	−4	38,000
T7	(United States) Raymond Floyd	69-74-72-69=284	−4	38,000
T7	(United States) John Huston	70-72-70-72=284	−4	38,000
T7	(United States) Steve Pate	70-75-70-69=284	−4	38,000
T7	(United States) Craig Stadler	68-71-69-76=284	−4	38,000
T7	(United States) Hal Sutton	74-67-72-71=284	−4	38,000

==== Scorecard ====
Eagle	Birdie	Bogey	Double bogey

Final round

Hole	1	2	3	4	5	6	7	8	9	10	11	12	13	14	15	16	17	18
Par	4	4	3	4	5	3	4	4	5	4	5	4	3	4	5	4	3	4
(United States) Daly	−10	−11	−11	−11	−12	−12	−12	−12	−12	−12	−12	−12	−13	−13	−14	−14	−12	−12
(United States) Lietzke	−8	−8	−8	−8	−8	−7	−7	−7	−8	−8	−8	−8	−8	−8	−9	−9	−9	−9
(United States) Gallagher	−2	−3	−3	−2	−2	−2	−2	−3	−3	−4	−5	−5	−4	−5	−6	−6	−6	−7
(United States) Knox	−8	−8	−8	−8	−8	−6	−6	−5	−6	−7	−7	−7	−7	−8	−8	−7	−7	−6

Cumulative tournament scores, relative to par

== Television ==
After a quarter century with ABC Sports, the PGA Championship returned to CBS Sports in 1991.
