= Western Open =

American professional golf tournament

Coordinates: 41.677°N 87.952°W

Tournament information
- Location: Lemont, Illinois
- Established: 1899
- Courses: Cog Hill Golf & Country Club (Dubsdread Course)
- Par: 71
- Length: 7,309 yards (6,683 m)
- Organized by: Western Golf Association
- Tour: PGA Tour
- Format: Stroke play
- Prize fund: US$5,000,000
- Month played: July
- Final year: 2006

Tournament record score
- Aggregate: 267 Scott Hoch (2001); 267 Tiger Woods (2003)
- To par: −21 as above

Final champion
- (South Africa) Trevor Immelman
- Location in the United States Location in Illinois

The Western Open was a professional golf tournament in the United States, for most of its history an event on the PGA Tour.

The tournament's founding in 1899 actually pre-dated the start of the Tour, which is generally dated from 1916, the year the PGA of America was founded. The Western Open, organized by the Western Golf Association, was first played in September 1899 at the Glen View Club in Golf, Illinois, the week preceding the U.S. Open. At the time of its final edition in 2006, it was the third-oldest active PGA Tour tournament, after The Open (1860) and U.S. Open (1895). The tournament was held a total of 103 times over the course of 108 years. The event was not held in 1900, 1918 (World War I), and 1943–45 (World War II). Players from the U.S. won the tournament 77 times, followed by Scotland with fifteen wins. Walter Hagen had the most victories with five, and seventeen others won the event at least twice. The champions' list includes two amateurs: Chick Evans in 1910 and Scott Verplank in 1985.

Beginning in 2007, the Western Open was renamed the BMW Championship, the penultimate event of the FedEx Cup playoff series. Played with the PGA Tour's point system as the sole qualification standard, it is no longer open to amateurs.

Title sponsorship was introduced in 1987, and included Beatrice, Centel, Sprint, Motorola, Advil, Golf Digest, and Cialis.

== History ==
The Western Open, founded and run by the Western Golf Association, was first played in 1899 in Illinois at the Glen View Club in Golf, a northern suburb of Chicago Like the U.S. Open, in its early days it was almost exclusively won by immigrant golf professionals from the British Isles, most of whom gained full citizenship to the United States. In its early decades it was widely regarded as one of the premier golf tournaments in the US, along with other notables of the day like the North and South Open, the PGA Championship and the Shawnee Open.

The Western Golf Association was, in some ways, and for some years, something of a rival to the United States Golf Association, especially in the midwestern and western sections of the country.

From the event's inception through 1961, it was played at a variety of midwestern locations, as well as places such as Arizona (Phoenix), Utah (Salt Lake City) and California (San Francisco, Los Angeles). In 1923, it was held in Tennessee at the Colonial Country Club in Memphis.

Beginning in 1962, the Western Open settled within the Chicago metropolitan area and was held at a variety of courses through 1973. In 1974, it found an annual home at the Butler National Golf Club in Oak Brook, a western suburb. It was played here through 1990, when the PGA Tour adopted a policy of holding events only at clubs which allowed minorities and women to be members. It moved in 1991 to Cog Hill Golf & Country Club in Lemont, southwest of Chicago. A 72-hole public complex, its Dubsdread Course hosted the Western Open for sixteen editions, through 2006.

In 1899, the prize fund was $150, and Willie Smith's winner's share was fifty dollars. The purse in 2006 was $5 million, with $900,000 to the final winner, Trevor Immelman.

During the second round of the 1975 tournament on Friday, June 27, Lee Trevino and Jerry Heard were struck by lightning on the 13th green of Butler National while waiting out a rain delay. Also struck at other parts of the course were Bobby Nichols, Jim Ahern, and Tony Jacklin.

== BMW Championship ==
In 2007, the Western Open was renamed—and changed in terms of invitational criteria—to the BMW Championship, part of the four-event FedEx Cup Playoff Series. The Western Golf Association continues to run the tournament. The BMW Championship is the last FedEx Cup playoff event before The Tour Championship

== Winners ==
Year	Winner	Score	To par	Margin of victory	Runner(s)-up	Venue	Location
Cialis Western Open
2006	(South Africa) Trevor Immelman	271	−13	2 strokes	(Australia) Mathew Goggin (United States) Tiger Woods	Cog Hill	Lemont, Illinois
2005	(United States) Jim Furyk	270	−14	2 strokes	(United States) Tiger Woods	Cog Hill	Lemont, Illinois
2004	(Trinidad and Tobago) Stephen Ames	274	−10	2 strokes	(United States) Steve Lowery	Cog Hill	Lemont, Illinois
Western Open
2003	(United States) Tiger Woods (3)	267	−21	5 strokes	(United States) Rich Beem	Cog Hill	Lemont, Illinois
Advil Western Open
2002	(United States) Jerry Kelly	269	−19	2 strokes	(United States) Davis Love III	Cog Hill	Lemont, Illinois
2001	(United States) Scott Hoch	267	−21	1 stroke	(United States) Davis Love III	Cog Hill	Lemont, Illinois
2000	(Australia) Robert Allenby	274	−14	Playoff	(Zimbabwe) Nick Price	Cog Hill	Lemont, Illinois
Motorola Western Open
1999	(United States) Tiger Woods (2)	273	−15	3 strokes	(Canada) Mike Weir	Cog Hill	Lemont, Illinois
1998	(United States) Joe Durant	271	−17	2 strokes	(Fiji) Vijay Singh	Cog Hill	Lemont, Illinois
1997	(United States) Tiger Woods	275	−13	3 strokes	(New Zealand) Frank Nobilo	Cog Hill	Lemont, Illinois
1996	(United States) Steve Stricker	270	−18	8 strokes	(United States) Billy Andrade (United States) Jay Don Blake	Cog Hill	Lemont, Illinois
1995	(United States) Billy Mayfair	279	−9	1 stroke	(United States) Jay Haas (United States) Justin Leonard (United States) Jeff Maggert (United States) Scott Simpson	Cog Hill	Lemont, Illinois
1994	(Zimbabwe) Nick Price (2)	277	−11	1 stroke	(United States) Greg Kraft	Cog Hill	Lemont, Illinois
Sprint Western Open
1993	(Zimbabwe) Nick Price	269	−19	5 strokes	(Australia) Greg Norman	Cog Hill	Lemont, Illinois
Centel Western Open
1992	(United States) Ben Crenshaw	276	−12	1 stroke	(Australia) Greg Norman	Cog Hill	Lemont, Illinois
1991	(United States) Russ Cochran	275	−13	2 strokes	(Australia) Greg Norman	Cog Hill	Lemont, Illinois
1990	(United States) Wayne Levi	275	−13	4 strokes	(United States) Payne Stewart	Butler National	Oak Brook, Illinois
Beatrice Western Open
1989	(United States) Mark McCumber (2)	275	−13	Playoff	(United States) Peter Jacobsen	Butler National	Oak Brook, Illinois
1988	(United States) Jim Benepe	278	−10	1 stroke	(United States) Peter Jacobsen	Butler National	Oak Brook, Illinois
1987	(United States) D. A. Weibring	207	−9	1 stroke	(United States) Larry Nelson (Australia) Greg Norman	Butler National	Oak Brook, Illinois
Western Open
1986	(United States) Tom Kite	286	−2	Playoff	(United States) Fred Couples (South Africa) David Frost (Zimbabwe) Nick Price	Butler National	Oak Brook, Illinois
1985	(United States) Scott Verplank (a)	279	−9	Playoff	(United States) Jim Thorpe	Butler National	Oak Brook, Illinois
1984	(United States) Tom Watson (3)	280	−8	Playoff	(Australia) Greg Norman	Butler National	Oak Brook, Illinois
1983	(United States) Mark McCumber	284	−4	1 stroke	(United States) Tom Watson	Butler National	Oak Brook, Illinois
1982	(United States) Tom Weiskopf	276	−12	1 stroke	(United States) Larry Nelson	Butler National	Oak Brook, Illinois
1981	(United States) Ed Fiori	277	−11	4 strokes	(United States) Jim Colbert (United States) Greg Powers (United States) Jim Simons	Butler National	Oak Brook, Illinois
1980	(United States) Scott Simpson	281	−7	5 strokes	(United States) Andy Bean	Butler National	Oak Brook, Illinois
1979	(United States) Larry Nelson	286	−2	Playoff	(United States) Ben Crenshaw	Butler National	Oak Brook, Illinois
1978	(United States) Andy Bean	282	−6	Playoff	(United States) Bill Rogers	Butler National	Oak Brook, Illinois
1977	(United States) Tom Watson (2)	283	−5	1 stroke	(United States) Wally Armstrong (United States) Johnny Miller	Butler National	Oak Brook, Illinois
1976	(United States) Al Geiberger	288	+4	1 stroke	(United States) Joe Porter	Butler National	Oak Brook, Illinois
1975	(United States) Hale Irwin	283	−1	1 stroke	(South Africa) Bobby Cole	Butler National	Oak Brook, Illinois
1974	(United States) Tom Watson	287	+3	2 strokes	(United States) J. C. Snead (United States) Tom Weiskopf	Butler National	Oak Brook, Illinois
1973	(United States) Billy Casper (4)	272	−12	1 stroke	(United States) Larry Hinson (United States) Hale Irwin	Midlothian	Midlothian, Illinois
1972	(United States) Jim Jamieson	271	−13	6 strokes	(United States) Labron Harris Jr.	Sunset Ridge	Northfield, Illinois
1971	(Australia) Bruce Crampton	279	−5	2 strokes	(United States) Bobby Nichols	Olympia Fields	Olympia Fields, Illinois
1970	(United States) Hugh Royer Jr.	273	−11	1 stroke	(United States) Dale Douglass	Beverly	Chicago, Illinois
1969	(United States) Billy Casper (3)	276	−8	4 strokes	(United States) Rocky Thompson	Midlothian	Midlothian, Illinois
1968	(United States) Jack Nicklaus (2)	273	−11	3 strokes	(United States) Miller Barber	Olympia Fields	Olympia Fields, Illinois
1967	(United States) Jack Nicklaus	274	−10	2 strokes	(United States) Doug Sanders	Beverly	Chicago, Illinois
1966	(United States) Billy Casper (2)	283	−1	3 strokes	(United States) Gay Brewer	Medinah	Medinah, Illinois
1965	(United States) Billy Casper	270	−14	2 strokes	(United States) Jack McGowan (United States) Chi-Chi Rodríguez	Tam O'Shanter	Niles, Illinois
1964	(United States) Chi-Chi Rodríguez	268	−16	1 stroke	(United States) Arnold Palmer	Tam O'Shanter	Niles, Illinois
1963	(United States) Arnold Palmer (2)	280	−4	Playoff	(United States) Julius Boros (United States) Jack Nicklaus	Beverly	Chicago, Illinois
1962	(United States) Jacky Cupit	281	−3	2 strokes	(United States) Billy Casper	Medinah	Medinah, Illinois
1961	(United States) Arnold Palmer	271	−13	2 strokes	(United States) Sam Snead	Blythefield	Belmont, Michigan
1960	(Canada) Stan Leonard	278	−10	Playoff	(United States) Art Wall Jr.	Western	Redford, Michigan
1959	(United States) Mike Souchak	272	−8	1 stroke	(United States) Arnold Palmer	Pittsburgh	Pittsburgh, Pennsylvania
1958	(United States) Doug Sanders	275	−13	1 stroke	(United States) Dow Finsterwald	Red Run	Royal Oak, Michigan
1957	(United States) Doug Ford	279	−5	Playoff	(United States) George Bayer (United States) Gene Littler (United States) Billy Maxwell	Plum Hollow	Southfield, Michigan
1956	(United States) Mike Fetchick	284	−4	Playoff	(United States) Doug Ford (United States) Jay Hebert (United States) Don January	Presidio	San Francisco, California
1955	(United States) Cary Middlecoff	272	−16	2 strokes	(United States) Mike Souchak	Portland	Portland, Oregon
1954	(United States) Lloyd Mangrum (2)	277	−7	Playoff	(United States) Ted Kroll	Kenwood	Cincinnati, Ohio
1953	(United States) Dutch Harrison	278	−2	4 strokes	(United States) Ed Furgol (United States) Fred Haas (United States) Lloyd Mangrum	Bellerive	Saint Louis, Missouri
1952	(United States) Lloyd Mangrum	274	−6	8 strokes	(South Africa) Bobby Locke	Westwood	Saint Louis, Missouri
1951	(United States) Marty Furgol	270	−10	1 stroke	(United States) Cary Middlecoff	Davenport	Pleasant Valley, Iowa
1950	(United States) Sam Snead (2)	282	−2	1 stroke	(Australia) Jim Ferrier (United States) Dutch Harrison	Brentwood	Los Angeles, California
1949	(United States) Sam Snead	268	−20	4 strokes	(United States) Cary Middlecoff	Keller	Saint Paul, Minnesota
1948	(United States) Ben Hogan (2)	281	−7	Playoff	(United States) Ed Oliver	Brookfield	Clarence, New York
1947	(United States) Johnny Palmer	270	−18	1 stroke	(South Africa) Bobby Locke (United States) Ed Oliver	Salt Lake City	Salt Lake City, Utah
1946	(United States) Ben Hogan	271	−17	4 strokes	(United States) Lloyd Mangrum	Sunset	Saint Louis, Missouri
1943–1945: No tournament due to World War II
1942	(United States) Herman Barron	276	−8	2 strokes	(United States) Henry Picard	Phoenix	Phoenix, Arizona
1941	(United States) Ed Oliver	275	−9	3 strokes	(United States) Ben Hogan (United States) Byron Nelson	Phoenix	Phoenix, Arizona
1940	(United States) Jimmy Demaret	293	+9	Playoff	(United States) Toney Penna	River Oaks	Houston, Texas
1939	(United States) Byron Nelson	281	−2	1 stroke	(United States) Lloyd Mangrum	Medinah	Medinah, Illinois
1938	(United States) Ralph Guldahl (3)	279	−5	7 strokes	(United States) Sam Snead	Westwood	Saint Louis, Missouri
1937	(United States) Ralph Guldahl (2)	288	E	Playoff	(United States) Horton Smith	Canterbury	Beachwood, Ohio
1936	(United States) Ralph Guldahl	274	−10	3 strokes	(United States) Ray Mangrum	Davenport	Pleasant Valley, Iowa
1935	(United States) Johnny Revolta	290	+6	4 strokes	(United States) Willie Goggin	South Bend	South Bend, Indiana
1934	(England) Harry Cooper	274	−14	Playoff	(United States) Ky Laffoon	Country Club of Peoria	Peoria Heights, Illinois
1933	(Scotland) Macdonald Smith (3)	282	E	6 strokes	(United States) Tommy Armour	Olympia Fields	Olympia Fields, Illinois
1932	(United States) Walter Hagen (5)	287	−1	1 stroke	(United States) Olin Dutra	Canterbury	Beachwood, Ohio
1931	(United States) Ed Dudley	280	−4	4 strokes	(United States) Walter Hagen	Miami Valley	Dayton, Ohio
1930	(United States) Gene Sarazen	278	−10	7 strokes	(United States) Al Espinosa	Indianwood	Lake Orion, Michigan
1929	(United States) Tommy Armour	273	−7	8 strokes	(United States) Horton Smith	Ozaukee	Mequon, Wisconsin
1928	(United States) Abe Espinosa	291	+3	3 strokes	(United States) Johnny Farrell	North Shore	Glenview, Illinois
1927	(United States) Walter Hagen (4)	281	−1	4 strokes	(United States) Al Espinosa (United States) Bill Mehlhorn	Olympia Fields	Olympia Fields, Illinois
1926	(United States) Walter Hagen (3)	279	−1	9 strokes	(England) Harry Cooper (United States) Gene Sarazen	Highland	Indianapolis, Indiana
1925	(Scotland) Macdonald Smith (2)	281	−7	6 strokes	(United States) Leo Diegel (United States) Johnny Farrell (United States) Emmet French (United States) Walter Hagen (United States) Bill Mehlhorn	Youngstown	Youngstown, Ohio
1924	(United States) Bill Mehlhorn	293	+5	8 strokes	(United States) Al Watrous	Calumet	Homewood, Illinois
1923	(Scotland) Jock Hutchison (2)	281	−3	6 strokes	(Scotland) Bobby Cruickshank (United States) Leo Diegel (United States) Walter Hagen (Australia) Joe Kirkwood, Sr.	Colonial	Cordova, Tennessee
1922	(United States) Mike Brady	291	+3	10 strokes	(Scotland) Laurie Ayton, Snr (Scotland) Jock Hutchison	Oakland Hills	Bloomfield Hills, Michigan
1921	(United States) Walter Hagen (2)	287	+3	5 strokes	(Scotland) Jock Hutchison	Oakwood	Cleveland Heights, Ohio
1920	(Scotland) Jock Hutchison	296	+4	1 stroke	(England) Jim Barnes (Scotland) Clarence Hackney (Scotland) Harry Hampton	Olympia Fields	Olympia Fields, Illinois
1919	(England) Jim Barnes (3)	283	+3	3 strokes	(United States) Leo Diegel	Mayfield	Lyndhurst, Ohio
1918: No tournament due to World War I
1917	(England) Jim Barnes (2)	283	−5	2 strokes	(United States) Walter Hagen	Westmoreland	Wilmette, Illinois
1916	(United States) Walter Hagen	286	−2	1 stroke	(Scotland) Jock Hutchison (England) George Sargent	Blue Mound	Milwaukee, Wisconsin
1915	(United States) Tom McNamara	304	+4	2 strokes	(Scotland) Alex Cunningham	Glen Oak	Glen Ellyn, Illinois
1914	(England) Jim Barnes	293	−3	1 stroke	(Scotland) Willie Kidd	Interlachen	Edina, Minnesota
1913	(United States) John McDermott	295	−1	7 strokes	(England) Mike Brady	Memphis	Memphis, Tennessee
1912	(Scotland) Macdonald Smith	299	+11	3 strokes	(Scotland) Alex Robertson	Idlewild	Flossmoor, Illinois
1911	(Scotland) Bobby Simpson (2)	2 and 1			(United States) Tom McNamara	Kent	Grand Rapids, Michigan
1910	(United States) Chick Evans (a)	6 and 5			(Scotland) George Simpson	Beverly	Chicago, Illinois
1909	(Scotland) Willie Anderson (4)	288		9 strokes	(Scotland) Stewart Gardner	Skokie	Glencoe, Illinois
1908	(Scotland) Willie Anderson (3)	299		1 stroke	(Scotland) Fred McLeod	Normandie	Saint Louis, Missouri
1907	(Scotland) Bobby Simpson	307		2 strokes	(Scotland) Willie Anderson (Scotland) Fred McLeod	Hinsdale	Clarendon Hills, Illinois
1906	(Scotland) Alex Smith (2)	306		3 strokes	(Scotland) Jack Hobens	Homewood	Flossmoor, Illinois
1905	(United States) Arthur Smith	278		2 strokes	(Scotland) James Maiden	Cincinnati	Cincinnati, Ohio
1904	(Scotland) Willie Anderson (2)	304		4 strokes	(Scotland) Alex Smith	Kent	Grand Rapids, Michigan
1903	(Scotland) Alex Smith	318		2 strokes	(Scotland) Laurie Auchterlonie (Scotland) David Brown	Milwaukee	River Hills, Wisconsin
1902	(Scotland) Willie Anderson	299		5 strokes	(Scotland) Willie Smith (England) Bert Way	Euclid	Cleveland Heights, Ohio
1901	(Scotland) Laurie Auchterlonie	160		2 strokes	(Scotland) David Bell	Midlothian	Midlothian, Illinois
1900: No tournament
1899	(Scotland) Willie Smith	156		Playoff	(Scotland) Laurie Auchterlonie	Glen View	Golf, Illinois
