= Western Golf Association =

Golf organization based in Illinois, United States

The logo of the Western Golf Association

Founded in 1899, the Western Golf Association (WGA) is one of the United States' oldest golf organizations. Its headquarters are located in Glenview, Illinois. The WGA sponsors six golf tournaments: the Western Junior; the Western Amateur; the Women's Western Junior; the Women's Western Amateur; the NV5 Invitational presented by Old National Bank on the Korn Ferry Tour and the BMW Championship, a FedEx Cup playoff event. The WGA has also administered the Evans Scholars Program for deserving caddies since its inception in 1930 through the Evans Scholars Foundation.

== Organization ==
More than 460 member clubs, organizations and affiliations are part of the WGA. Par Club members and 100,000 golfers participate in the Bag Tag Program in support of the Evans Scholars Foundation, one of the nation's largest individually funded scholarship programs. The program is also supported by 25 affiliated golf associations and proceeds from the BMW Championship, one of the PGA Tour's FedEx Cup playoff events.

In addition to a staff made up of many Evans Scholars Alumni, the WGA has officers who volunteer their time to operate the organization. They are called WGA Directors.

== Evans Scholars Foundation ==
Since 1930, the Evans Scholars Foundation has awarded full tuition and housing scholarships to deserving caddies across the country. The foundation was started by Charles "Chick" Evans Jr. It is overseen by the WGA and aided by affiliated U.S. country clubs.

There are 1,130 Evans Scholars attending 24 universities in the United States. More than 12,000 caddies have graduated from college as Evans Scholars.

To qualify for the Evans Scholarship, students must have outstanding academic and caddie records, good character and leadership skills and financial need. The Scholarship is renewed on a yearly basis.

There are 17 universities with Evans Scholars Scholarship Houses, 24 partnership Universities in total. The 17 chapters are as follows in order of foundation: Northwestern University (1940), University of Illinois (1951), University of Michigan (1952), University of Wisconsin (1953), Michigan State University (1955), Marquette University (1955), University of Minnesota (1958), Ohio State University (1962), Purdue University (1967), University of Colorado (1967), University of Missouri (1968), Indiana University (1969), Miami University (1974), University of Oregon (2016), University of Kansas (2018), University of Washington (2018) and Penn State University (2019). Evans Scholars are also attending University of Chicago, Howard University, University of Illinois Chicago, University of Iowa, University of Maryland, University of Notre Dame and Rutgers University.

== Early years ==
Originally formed as a rulesmaking body, the WGA was born because U.S. western golf clubs (the current Midwest was "the west" in the 1890s) felt that they weren't being properly represented in the United States Golf Association, based then in New York. But after 20 stormy years followed by negotiations, the WGA officially recognized the USGA's authority as the rulesmaking body in the U.S.

The WGA oversees and hosts professional and amateur events. Today it has conducted more than 300 tournaments. Its first tournaments were held at the Glen View Club. These included the first Western Open which was held in 1899. The Western Open continued to be hosted by the association until 2006 when the name was changed to the BMW Championship for the 2007 tournament.
