= Conway Farms Golf Club =

Private golf club in Illinois, US

- Location within the United States Location within Illinois
- 42.231°N 87.892°W

Club information
- Location: Lake Forest, Illinois, U.S.
- Elevation: 700 feet (215 m)
- Established: 1991; 35 years ago
- Type: Private
- Tota holes: 18
- Tournaments: BMW Championship (2013, 2015, 2017)
- Greens: 007 / Tyee Bentgrass
- Fairways: Penncross Bentgrass
- Website: conwayfarmsgolfclub.org
- Designed by: Tom Fazio
- Par: 71
- Length: 7,233 yards (6,614 m)
- Course rating: 76.3
- Slope rating: 152
- Course record: 59 – Jim Furyk (2013)

Conway Farms Golf Club is a private golf club in the central United States, located in west Lake Forest, Illinois, a suburb north of Chicago. Designed by Tom Fazio, the course opened for play 35 years ago in 1991 and is notable for having hosted numerous amateur championship tournaments since 1997 as well as the PGA Tour's BMW Championship in 2013, 2015, and 2017, part of the season-ending FedEx Cup playoffs in September.

Luke Donald held the course record of 61 at Conway Farms for almost five years until 2013, when Jim Furyk shot a 59 during the second round of the BMW Championship on September 13; it was the sixth 59 in tour history.

== Course ==
Hole	Yards	Par	Hole	Yards	Par
1	360	4	10	458	4
2	196	3	11	177	3
3	405	4	12	419	4
4	505	4	13	465	4
5	470	4	14	585	5
6	218	3	15	334	4
7	345	4	16	466	4
8	600	5	17	230	3
9	405	4	18	595	5
Out	3,504	35	In	3,729	36
Source:			Total	7,233	71

== Notable members ==
- Luke Donald
- Olin Kreutz
- Dale Tallon
- Matt Nagy
- Nick Kokonas
- Bryan Segal
