= BMW Championship =

Golf tournament held in the United States

Coordinates: 38.66°N 90.48°W

Tournament information
- Location: Town and Country, Missouri
- Established: 2007
- Course: Bellerive Country Club
- Par: 71
- Length: 7,547 yards (6,901 m)
- Tour: PGA Tour
- Format: Stroke play
- Prize fund: US$20,000,000
- Month played: August
- Website: bmwchampionship.com

Tournament record score
- Aggregate: 260 Keegan Bradley (2018); 260 Justin Rose (2018)
- To par: −27 Patrick Cantlay (2021) −27 Bryson DeChambeau (2021)

Current champion
- (United States) Wyndham Clark

Location map
- Location in the United States Location in Missouri

The BMW Championship is a professional golf tournament which is the penultimate FedEx Cup playoff event on the PGA Tour schedule. Introduced in 2007, the BMW Championship was previously known as the Western Open. The Western Golf Association, which founded and ran the Western Open, runs the BMW Championship. In 2012, 2013, and 2014, the PGA Tour named the BMW Championship its Tournament of the Year. The BMW Championship is the longest running regular PGA Tour event on the calendar outside of the four major tournaments.

== Western Open ==
The Western Open was first played 127 years ago in 1899. For many years, the Western was played in and out of the state of Illinois, before eventually settling down in the Chicago area. The Western Golf Association (WGA) ran the Western Open throughout its entire history (1899–2006), and continues to run the tournament under its new title. These are, however, two entirely different events in terms of playing format and invitational criteria. The Western Open was like any other regular PGA Tour stop – although it was once considered to be one of golf's majors. The BMW Championship is part of the FedEx Cup Playoffs, and only the leading FedEx Cup points earners at the start of the BMW event are eligible to play.

== Tournament format ==
The BMW Championship is open to the leading FedEx Cup points earners on the PGA Tour following the FedEx St. Jude Championship. Through 2022, the top 70 players were qualified, after which it was reduced to the top 50. With a limited field, there is no 36-hole cut. The top 30 in the FedEx Cup points list following the BMW Championship advance to The Tour Championship, where the FedEx Cup champion is decided.

== Winners ==
Year	Winner	Score	To par	Margin of victory	Runner(s)-up	Purse ($)	Winner's share ($)	Venue
2026	(United States) Wyndham Clark	263	−17	3 strokes	(United States) Patrick Cantlay	20,000,000	3,600,000	Bellerive
2025	(United States) Scottie Scheffler	265	−15	2 strokes	(Scotland) Robert MacIntyre	20,000,000	3,600,000	Caves Valley
2024	(United States) Keegan Bradley (2)	276	−12	1 stroke	(Sweden) Ludvig Åberg (United States) Sam Burns (Australia) Adam Scott	20,000,000	3,600,000	Castle Pines
2023	(Norway) Viktor Hovland	263	−17	2 strokes	(England) Matt Fitzpatrick (United States) Scottie Scheffler	20,000,000	3,600,000	Olympia Fields
2022	(United States) Patrick Cantlay (2)	270	−14	1 stroke	(United States) Scott Stallings	15,000,000	2,700,000	Wilmington
2021	(United States) Patrick Cantlay	261	−27	Playoff	(United States) Bryson DeChambeau	9,500,000	1,710,000	Caves Valley
2020	(Spain) Jon Rahm	276	−4	Playoff	(United States) Dustin Johnson	9,500,000	1,710,000	Olympia Fields
2019	(United States) Justin Thomas	263	−25	3 strokes	(United States) Patrick Cantlay	9,250,000	1,665,000	Medinah
2018	(United States) Keegan Bradley	260	−20	Playoff	(England) Justin Rose	9,000,000	1,620,000	Aronimink
2017	(Australia) Marc Leishman	261	−23	5 strokes	(United States) Rickie Fowler (England) Justin Rose	8,750,000	1,575,000	Conway Farms
2016	(United States) Dustin Johnson (2)	265	−23	3 strokes	(England) Paul Casey	8,500,000	1,530,000	Crooked Stick
2015	(Australia) Jason Day	262	−22	6 strokes	(United States) Daniel Berger	8,250,000	1,485,000	Conway Farms
2014	(United States) Billy Horschel	266	−14	2 strokes	(United States) Bubba Watson	8,000,000	1,440,000	Cherry Hills
2013	(United States) Zach Johnson	268	−16	2 strokes	(United States) Nick Watney	8,000,000	1,440,000	Conway Farms
2012	(Northern Ireland) Rory McIlroy	268	−20	2 strokes	(United States) Phil Mickelson (England) Lee Westwood	8,000,000	1,440,000	Crooked Stick
2011	(England) Justin Rose	271	−13	2 strokes	(Australia) John Senden	8,000,000	1,440,000	Cog Hill
2010	(United States) Dustin Johnson	275	−9	1 stroke	(England) Paul Casey	7,500,000	1,350,000	Cog Hill
2009	(United States) Tiger Woods (5)	265	−19	8 strokes	(United States) Jim Furyk (Australia) Marc Leishman	7,500,000	1,350,000	Cog Hill
2008	(Colombia) Camilo Villegas	265	−15	2 strokes	(United States) Dudley Hart	7,000,000	1,260,000	Bellerive
2007	(United States) Tiger Woods (4)	262	−22	2 strokes	(Australia) Aaron Baddeley	7,000,000	1,260,000	Cog Hill

== Host venues ==
Four of the first five editions of the BMW Championship were held at Cog Hill Golf & Country Club, which had hosted the Western Open since 1991. Since 2011, no course has hosted in consecutive years, with the tournament moving throughout the Midwest and sometimes venturing into Colorado as well as the Mid-Atlantic region. The Chicago metropolitan area remains the most frequent location, having hosted the event ten times at four different courses.

Venue	Location	First	Last	Times
Cog Hill Golf & Country Club	Lemont, Illinois	2007	2011	4
Conway Farms Golf Club	Lake Forest, Illinois	2013	2017	3
Crooked Stick Golf Club	Carmel, Indiana	2012	2016	2
Olympia Fields Country Club (North Course)	Olympia Fields, Illinois	2020	2023	2
Caves Valley Golf Club	Owings Mills, Maryland	2021	2025	2
Bellerive Country Club	Town and Country, Missouri	2008	2026	2
Cherry Hills Country Club	Cherry Hills Village, Colorado	2014		1
Aronimink Golf Club	Newtown Square, Pennsylvania	2018		1
Medinah Country Club (Course 3)	Medinah, Illinois	2019		1
Wilmington Country Club	Wilmington, Delaware	2022		1
Castle Pines Golf Club	Castle Rock, Colorado	2024		1

=== Future sites ===
Year	Course	Location
2027	Liberty National Golf Club	Jersey City, New Jersey
