= Golf in the United States =

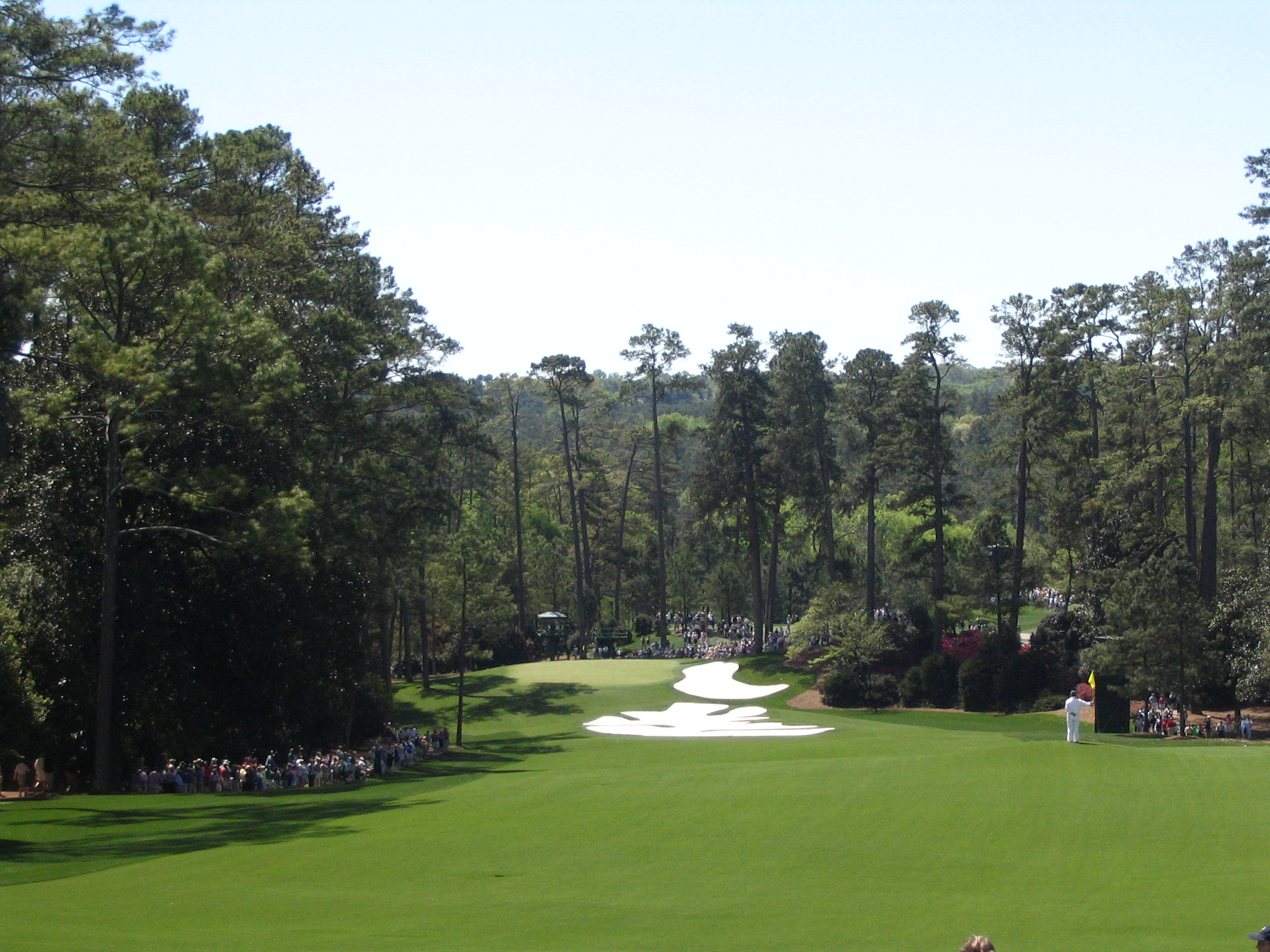
Augusta National Golf Club

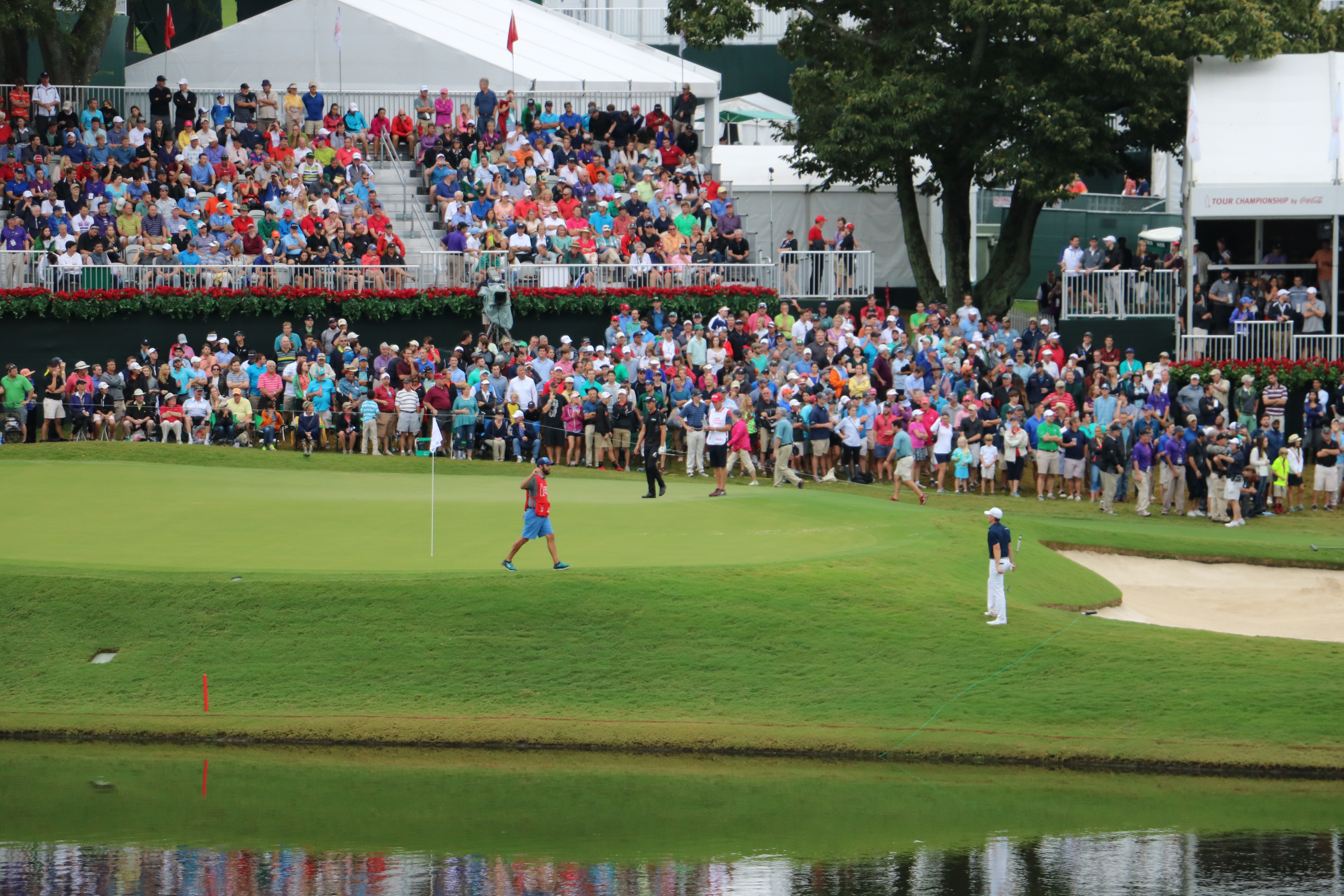
East Lake Golf Club

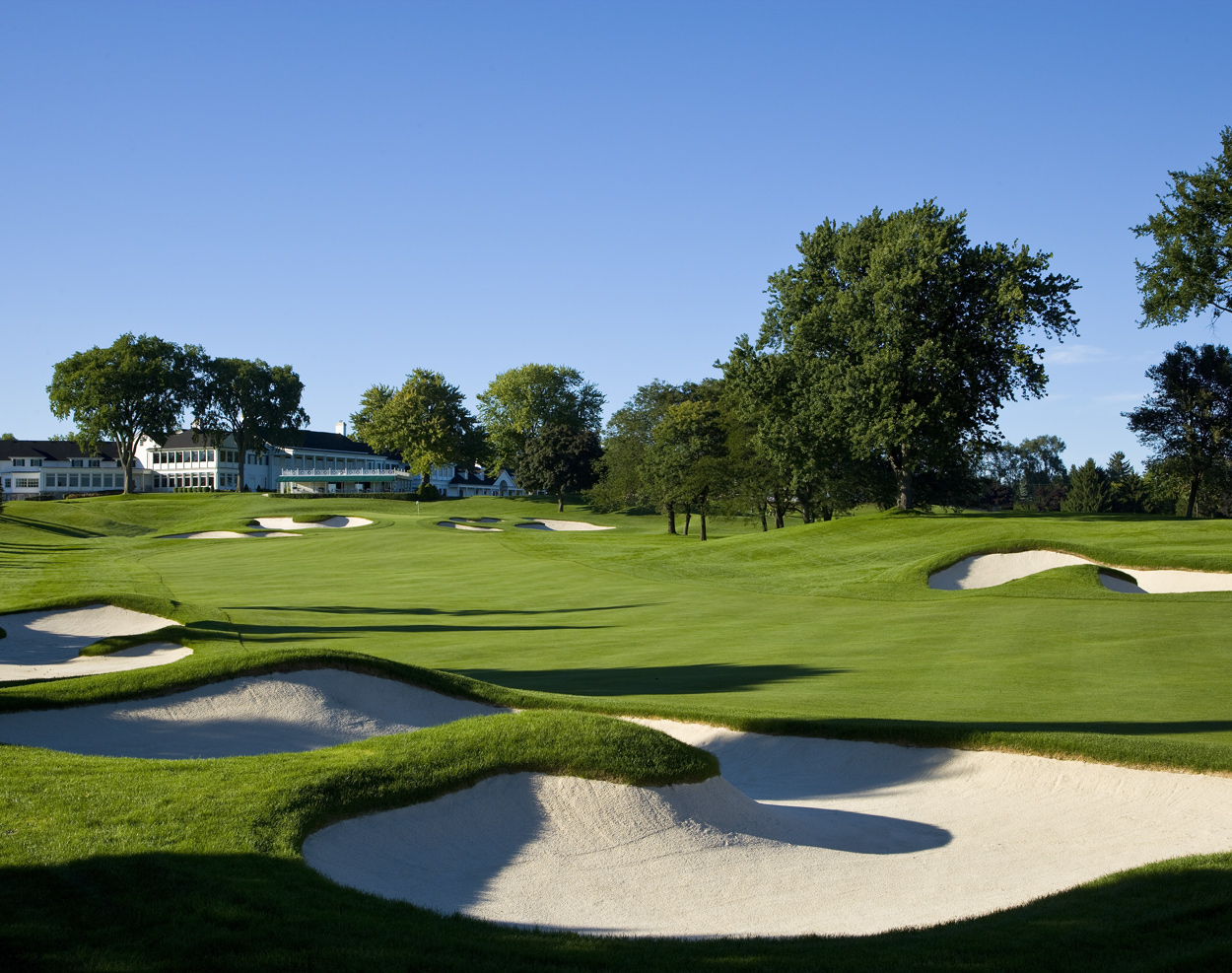
Oakland Hills Country Club

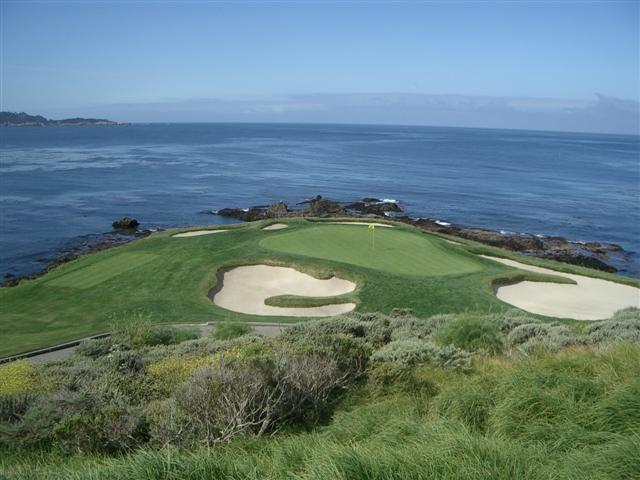
Pebble Beach Golf Links

Golf in the United States is played by about 25 million people, or 8% of the population.

Professional golf is aired on several television networks, such as Golf Channel, NBC, ESPN, TNT, CBS and Fox.

== Organizations ==
=== USGA ===
The United States Golf Association has about 10,000 club members and courses. The organization is responsible for the Rules of Golf together with the British-based R&A.

The USGA conducts national championships open to professionals: the U.S. Open (since 1895), U.S. Women's Open (since 1946), U.S. Senior Open (since 1980), and U.S. Senior Women's Open (since 2018), as well as national championships for amateur, juniors, seniors and four-ball teams.

The USGA co-organizes the Walker Cup and Curtis Cup together with the respective British & Irish organizations, and competes at the Eisenhower Trophy and Espirito Santo Trophy, which are amateur tournaments for national teams. Also, the USGA gives the Bob Jones Award recognition of distinguished sportsmanship in golf since 1955.

=== PGA of America ===
The Professional Golfers' Association of America was founded in 1916 and has 28,000 club professional members. They organize three tournaments for tour players: the PGA Championship (since 1916), Senior PGA Championship (since 1937) and Women's PGA Championship (since 2015), as well as the PGA Professional National Championship (since 1968) for club players. The PGA of America also co-organizes the Ryder Cup and PGA Cup.

=== Professional tours ===
The PGA Tour is the main professional golf tour in the United States. It was established by the PGA of America in 1929 and was spun off in 1968.

Its calendar features the four major tournaments and previously the World Golf Championships (which were discontinued in 2023), but do not organize them. The PGA Tour organizes several tournaments, most notably The Players Championship and Tour Championship. In addition it co-organizes the biennial Presidents Cup.

The PGA Tour also operates other professional tours. The Korn Ferry Tour is the developmental tour since 1990. PGA Tour Champions has been the main senior tour since 1980, and the PGA Tour organizes two of the five senior major championships: The Tradition and Senior Players Championship. The organization also operates tours in Canada, Latin America and China.

There is not a well defined third tier of golf tours in the United States. The larger regional tours include the Gateway Tour and Swing Thought Tour; there is a constantly changing roster of small "mini-tours".

The LPGA Tour is the main women's professional tour, founded in 1950. Its calendar features several major championships and national golf opens. It organizes several tournaments, including the ANA Inspiration, one of the major tournaments, and the CME Group Tour Championship. The LPGA Tour also co-organizes the biennial Solheim Cup. The Symetra Tour has been the official development tour of the LPGA Tour since 1999.

== Media ==
=== Television ===
The current television partners of the PGA Tour are CBS, NBC and the Golf Channel. NBC also airs the British Open, Ryder Cup, Presidents Cup and Solheim Cup. CBS also carries the Masters and PGA Championship. The Golf Channel also carries the European Tour and LPGA Tour.

Fox has a contract with the USGA since 2015 to air the U.S. Open, U.S. Women's Open and U.S. Senior Open.

ESPN aired several golf tournaments from 1979 to 2015. It carries the early rounds of the Masters and the PGA Championship.

=== Magazines ===
Notable dedicated magazines include Golf Digest (1950, Condé Nast), Golf Magazine (1959, Time Inc.), Golfweek (1975, Gannett), and Links (1988, Purcell).

== Notable American golfers ==
=== Men ===
- Jack Nicklaus - 18 major championship wins
- Tiger Woods - 15 major championship wins
- Walter Hagen - 11 major championship wins
- Ben Hogan - 9 major championship wins
- Tom Watson- 8 major championship wins
- Bobby Jones - 7 major championship wins
- Arnold Palmer - 7 major championship wins
- Gene Sarazen - 7 major championship wins
- Sam Snead - 7 major championship wins
- Lee Trevino- 6 major championship wins
- Phil Mickelson - 6 major championship wins

=== Women ===
- Amy Alcott - 5 major championship wins
- Patty Berg - 15 major championship wins
- Pat Bradley - 6 major championship wins
- Juli Inkster - 7 major championship wins
- Betsy King - 6 major championship wins
- Betsy Rawls - 8 major championship wins
- Patty Sheehan - 6 major championship wins
- Louise Suggs - 11 major championship wins
- Kathy Whitworth - 6 major championship wins
- Mickey Wright - 13 major championship wins
- Babe Zaharias - 10 major championship wins

== Notable golf courses ==
Midwest

- Crystal Downs Country Club - Frankfort, Michigan
- Dubsdread - Lemont, Illinois
- Erin Hills - Erin, Wisconsin
- Hazeltine National Golf Club - Chaska, Minnesota
- Inverness Club - Toledo, Ohio
- Medinah Country Club - Medinah, Illinois
- Muirfield Village - Dublin, Ohio
- Oakland Hills Country Club - Bloomfield Township, Michigan
- Sand Hills Golf Club - Mullen, Nebraska
- Valhalla Golf Club - Louisville, Kentucky
- Whistling Straits – Haven, Wisconsin
- Maywood Country Club - Bardstown, Kentucky

Southeast

- Augusta National Golf Club - Augusta, Georgia
- East Lake Golf Club - Atlanta, Georgia
- Kiawah Island Golf Resort – Kiawah Island, South Carolina
- PGA National Golf Club - Palm Beach Gardens, Florida
- Pinehurst Resort – Pinehurst, North Carolina
- Seminole Golf Club - Juno Beach, Florida
- Southern Hills Country Club - Tulsa, Oklahoma
- TPC at Sawgrass - Ponte Vedra Beach, Florida

Northeast

- Baltusrol Golf Club - Springfield, New Jersey
- Bethpage Black Course – Farmingdale, New York
- Congressional Country Club - Bethesda, Maryland
- Fishers Island Club - Fishers Island, New York
- Merion Golf Club - Ardmore, Pennsylvania
- National Golf Links of America - Southampton, New York
- Oak Hill Country Club - Pittsford, New York
- Oakmont Country Club - Oakmont, Pennsylvania
- Pine Valley Golf Club - Pine Valley, New Jersey
- Shinnecock Hills Golf Club - Southampton, New York
- The Country Club - Brookline, Massachusetts
- Winged Foot Golf Club - Mamaroneck, New York

West

- Cypress Point Club - Pebble Beach, California
- Olympic Club - San Francisco, California
- Pebble Beach Golf Links - Pebble Beach, California
- Riviera Country Club - Pacific Palisades, California
- Southern Highlands Golf Club - Las Vegas, Nevada
- Torrey Pines Golf Course - La Jolla, California

== See also ==
- United States Golf Teachers Cup
- World Golf Hall of Fame
- NCAA Division I Men's Golf Championships
- NCAA Division I Women's Golf Championships
- American Junior Golf Association
- Sports in the United States
