= Hooker County Courthouse =

- U.S. National Register of Historic Places
- U.S. Historic district
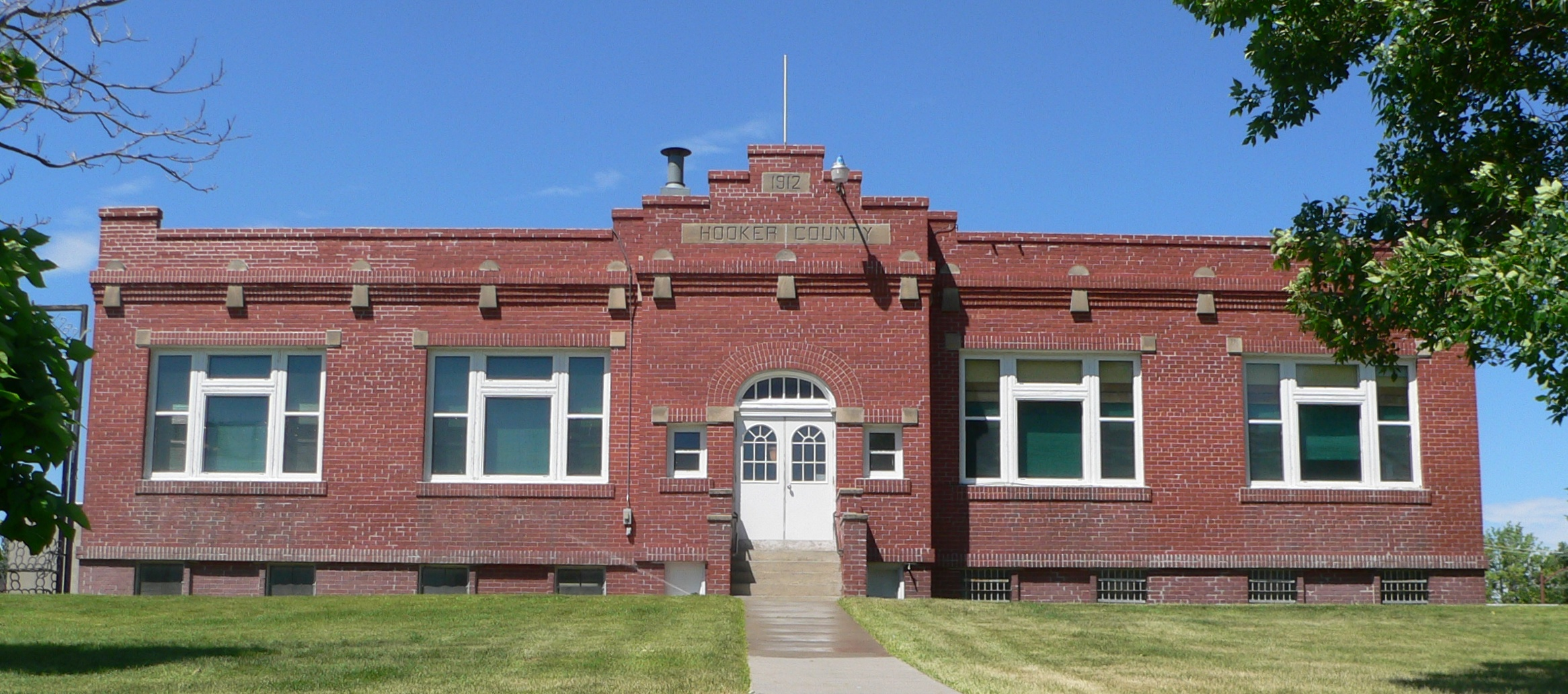

- Location within Nebraska Location within the United States
- Location: Cleveland Ave. between Railroad and 1st Sts., Mullen, Nebraska
- Coordinates: 42°2′33″N 101°2′43″W
- Area: 1.4 acres (0.57 ha)
- Built: 1912
- Architect: Kirschke, Oscar R.
- Architectural style: Late 19th and Early 20th Century American Movements
- MPS: County Courthouses of Nebraska MPS
- NRHP reference No.: 89002218
- Added to NRHP: January 10, 1990

The Hooker County Courthouse, located on Cleveland Ave. between Railroad and 1st Sts. in Mullen, Nebraska, is a courthouse building of Hooker County, Nebraska. It was built in 1912. It was a work of Grand Island architect Oscar R. Kirschke.

It was listed on the National Register of Historic Places in 1990. It was deemed significant as a good example of the "County Citadel" type of courthouse.
