= Bailey Yard =

World's largest railway yard (North Platte, Nebraska, US)

- Aerial view of Bailey Yard

General information
- Location: North Platte, Nebraska; US
- Coordinates: 41.15°N 100.83°W
- System: Railway classification (hump yard) and repair facilities
- Owner: Union Pacific Railroad Company
- Operator: Union Pacific Railroad Company

Construction
- Structure type: At-grade

History
- Opened: 1866; 160 years ago
Location

Bailey Yard is the world's largest railroad classification yard. Employees sort, service and repair locomotives and cars headed all across North America. Owned and operated by the Union Pacific Railroad Company (UP), Bailey Yard is located in North Platte, Nebraska. The yard is named after former Union Pacific president Edd H. Bailey.

== Facilities ==
Bailey Yard is halfway between Denver and Omaha. It covers a total expanse of 2,850 acres (4.45 mi^{2}; 11.5 km^{2}) and is over 8 miles (13 km) in length and 1 mile (1.6 km) wide at its widest point; the facility is about 1,000 yards (910 m) wide on average. The entire facility is large enough to hold 2,155 American football fields (including the end zones). Bailey Yard has 200 separate tracks totaling 315 miles (507 km) of track, 985 switches, 766 turnouts, and 17 receiving and 16 departure tracks. Union Pacific employs more than 2,600 people in North Platte, most of whom are responsible for the day-to-day operations of Bailey Yard.

An average of 139 trains and over 14,000 railroad cars pass through Bailey Yard every day. The yard sorts approximately 3,000 cars daily using the yard's two humps. The eastbound hump is a 34 foot (10 m) tall mound, and the westbound hump is 20 feet (6.1 m) high. These are used to sort four cars per minute into one of the 114 "bowl" tracks -- 49 tracks for the westbound trains, and 65 for eastbound. The bowl tracks are used to form trains headed for destinations across North America, including the East, West and Gulf coasts of the United States, and Canadian and Mexican borders.

The yard also includes 3 locomotive fueling and servicing centers called eastbound run thru, westbound run thru, and a service track that handles more than 8,500 locomotives per month, a locomotive repair shop that can repair 750 locomotives monthly, and 4 separate car repair facilities that repair, on average, of 75 cars daily. The car repair shop replaces 18,000 wheel-sets each year. The yard features an in-motion wheel defect detector developed by Union Pacific that uses ultrasound technology to inspect each wheel. Locomotives can be serviced in a NASCAR-like pit stop facility called a Run-Thru staffed by five different crafts—an electrician, machinist, fireman, oiler, and car inspector. Locomotives are serviced in 45 minutes without detaching them from their trains. The cars go through the car department to get fixed, while the diesel locomotives go to the diesel shop.

Because of the enormous amount of products that pass through Bailey Yard, Union Pacific describes the yard as an “economic barometer of America.”

The privately-operated Golden Spike Tower & Visitor Center, which is located adjacent to the south side of Bailey Yard, provides a safe public viewing overlook of UP train, locomotive and switching movements within the Bailey Yard complex.

== History ==
North Platte was first platted as a railroad town by chief engineer Grenville Dodge. He chose the location because of the availability of good water nearby, and its relative proximity (about 135 miles) to Grand Island, Nebraska. The town, first known as "Hell on Wheels", received its first train in 1866. Dodge then constructed major shop facilities and winter quarters for its crews. In 1867 it began conducting main line operations through the town. The early yard was a flat-switched yard with 20 tracks.

Buffalo Bill located Scouts Rest Ranch at North Platte because it allowed him to move his Wild West Show by train or by wagon across the United States relatively quickly. From 1941 to 1946, the North Platte Canteen served baked goods and refreshments to more than six million service members during a 10-minute stop as they were convoyed across the United States. After 105 years, passenger service was discontinued in 1971.

North Platte became a division point for UP, where trains are sorted, railroad crews are exchanged, and maintenance or repairs are performed on equipment. Bailey Yard was updated after World War II in 1948 as a hump yard with 42 tracks. Another hump yard with 64 tracks was added in 1968, followed by a diesel locomotive shop in 1971, and a railroad car shop in 1974. In 1980, the 1948 hump yard was replaced with a new 50-track yard.

In 1995, due to its massive size, the yard was recognized in the Guinness Book of Records as the largest rail yard in the world. It was featured on the "Freight Trains" episode of Modern Marvels on The History Channel.

== See also ==
- List of rail yards
