= Hooker County, Nebraska =

County in Nebraska, United States

- County
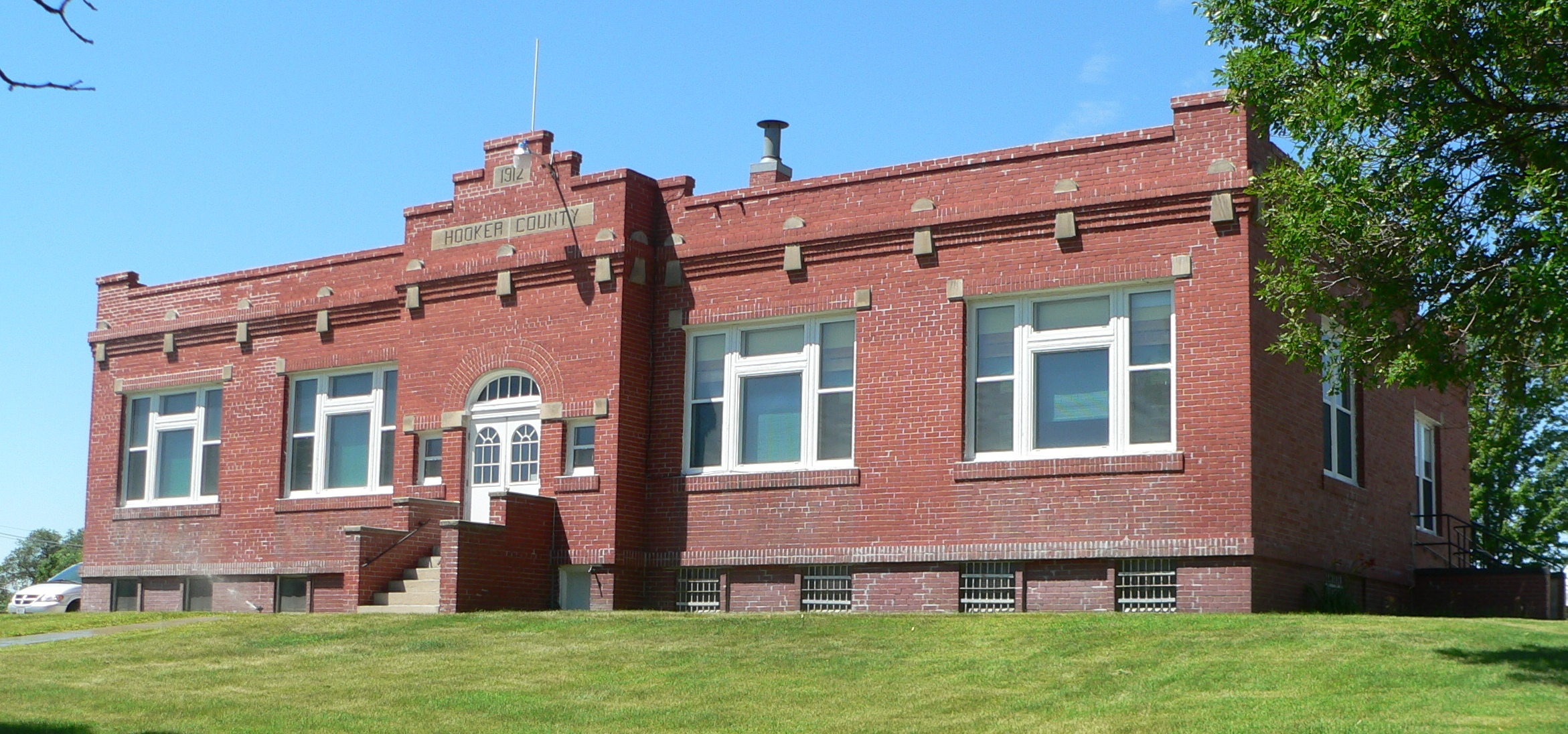
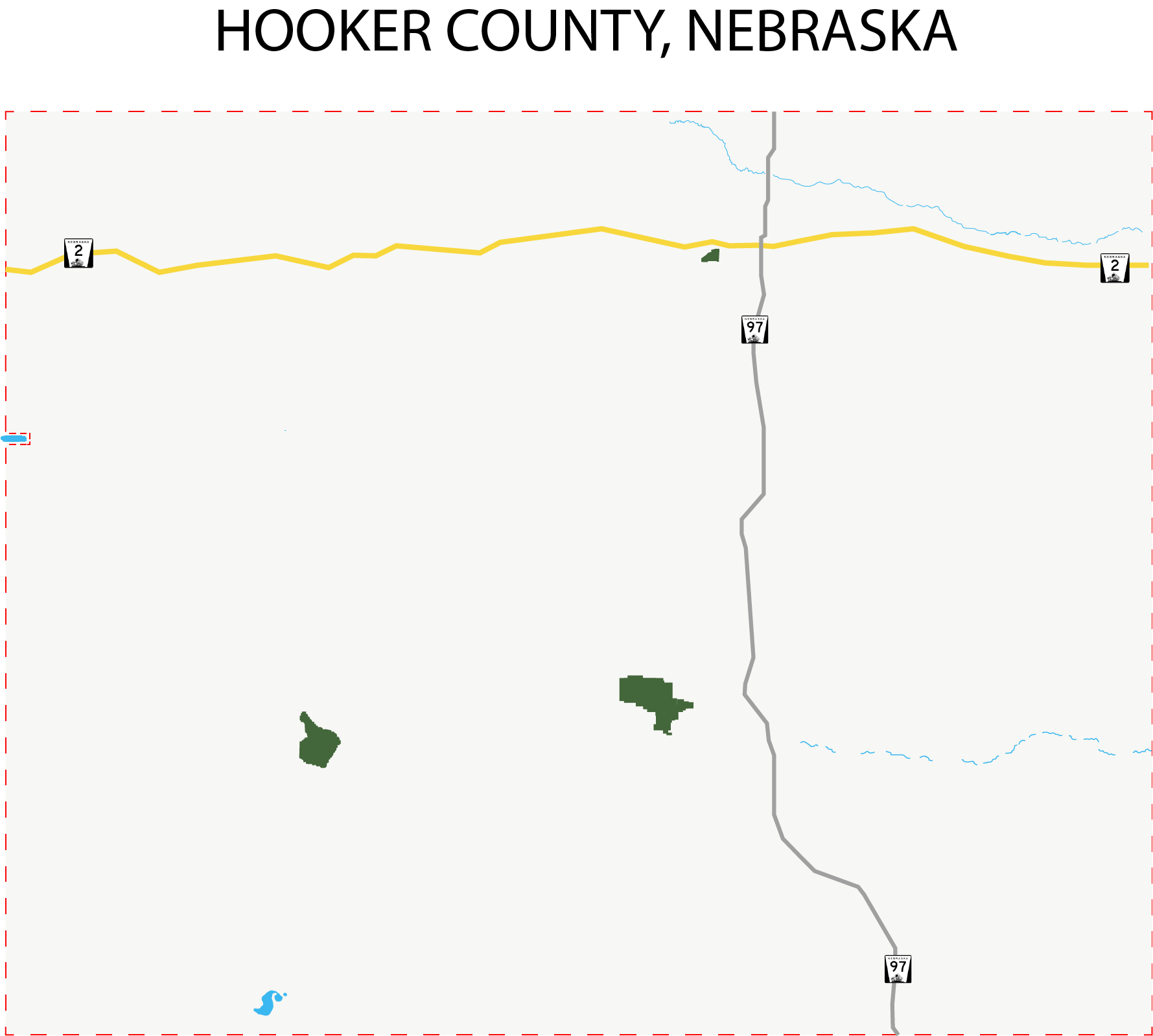
- The Hooker County Courthouse in Mullen Hooker County, Nebraska

- Location within the U.S. state of Nebraska
- Coordinates: 41.920317°N 101.117324°W
- Country: United States
- State: Nebraska
- Founded: March 29, 1889
- Named for: Joseph Hooker
- Seat: Mullen
- Largest village: Mullen

Area
  - Total: 721.401 sq mi (1,868.42 km^{2})
  - Land: 720.966 sq mi (1,867.29 km^{2})
  - Water: 0.535 sq mi (1.39 km^{2}) 0.07%

Population (2020)
  - Total: 711
  - Estimate (2025): 686 ▼
  - Density: 0.986/sq mi (0.381/km^{2})
- Time zone: UTC−7 (Mountain)
  - Summer (DST): UTC−6 (MDT)
- Area code: 308
- Congressional district: 3rd
- Website: hookercountyne.gov
- • Nebraska county number 46 • Nebraska license plate prefix 93

Hooker County is a county in the U.S. state of Nebraska. As of the 2020 census, the population was 711, and was estimated to be 686 in 2025. The county seat and the largest village is Mullen, which (as of 2019) is the county's only community of substantial size.

In the Nebraska license plate system, Hooker County was represented by the prefix "93" (as it had the smallest number of registered vehicles out of the state's 93 counties of vehicles registered in the state when the license plate system was established in 1922).

== History ==
Hooker County was created on March 29, 1889 with construction of a line for Chicago, Burlington and Quincy Railroad into the territory. It was named for Civil War General Joseph Hooker.

== Geography ==
According to the United States Census Bureau, the county has a total area of 721.401 square miles (1,868.42 km^{2}), of which 720.966 square miles (1,867.29 km^{2}) is land and 0.535 square miles (1.39 km^{2}) (0.07%) is water. It is the 33rd-largest county in Nebraska by total area.

The terrain of Hooker County consists of low rolling hills running east–west. The Middle Loup River flows eastward through the upper part of the county.

Most of Nebraska's 93 counties (the eastern 2/3) observe Central Time; the western counties observe Mountain Time. Hooker County is the easternmost of the Nebraska counties to observe Mountain Time.

=== Major highways ===
- Nebraska Highway 2
- Nebraska Highway 97

=== Adjacent counties ===
- Cherry County – north
- Thomas County – east (Central Time Zone boundary)
- McPherson County – south
- Arthur County – southwest
- Grant County – west

=== Lakes ===
- Carr Lake
- Jefford Lake

== Demographics ==
Historical population
Census	Pop.	Note	%±
1890	426		—
1900	432		1.4%
1910	981		127.1%
1920	1,378		40.5%
1930	1,180		−14.4%
1940	1,253		6.2%
1950	1,061		−15.3%
1960	1,130		6.5%
1970	939		−16.9%
1980	990		5.4%
1990	793		−19.9%
2000	783		−1.3%
2010	736		−6.0%
2020	711		−3.4%
2025 (est.)	686	▼	−3.5%
U.S. Decennial Census; 1790–1960 1900–1990; 1990–2000 2010–2020

=== 2020 census ===
As of the 2020 census, the county had a population of 711. The median age was 46.3 years. 19.3% of residents were under the age of 18 and 31.5% of residents were 65 years of age or older. For every 100 females there were 97.5 males, and for every 100 females age 18 and over there were 94.6 males age 18 and over.

The racial makeup of the county was 93.5% White, 0.6% Black or African American, 0.7% American Indian and Alaska Native, 0.1% Asian, 0.0% Native Hawaiian and Pacific Islander, 0.1% from some other race, and 4.9% from two or more races. Hispanic or Latino residents of any race comprised 1.5% of the population.

0.0% of residents lived in urban areas, while 100.0% lived in rural areas.

There were 323 households in the county, of which 25.1% had children under the age of 18 living with them and 22.9% had a female householder with no spouse or partner present. About 32.8% of all households were made up of individuals and 13.6% had someone living alone who was 65 years of age or older.

There were 408 housing units, of which 20.8% were vacant. Among occupied housing units, 75.5% were owner-occupied and 24.5% were renter-occupied. The homeowner vacancy rate was 2.2% and the rental vacancy rate was 11.1%.

=== 2000 census ===
As of the 2000 census, there were 783 people, 335 households, and 220 families in the county. The population density was 1.0 person per square mile (0.39 persons/km^{2}). There were 440 housing units at an average density of 0.6 units per square mile (0.23/km^{2}). The racial makeup of the county was 98.72% White, 0.38% Native American, 0.13% Asian, 0.13% from other races, and 0.64% from two or more races. 1.02% of the population were Hispanic or Latino of any race.

There were 335 households, out of which 26.90% had children under the age of 18 living with them, 60.30% were married couples living together, 3.90% had a female householder with no husband present, and 34.30% were non-families. 33.10% of all households were made up of individuals, and 19.10% had someone living alone who was 65 years of age or older. The average household size was 2.26 and the average family size was 2.90.

The county population contained 24.00% under the age of 18, 4.10% from 18 to 24, 21.60% from 25 to 44, 23.40% from 45 to 64, and 26.90% who were 65 years of age or older. The median age was 45 years. For every 100 females there were 83.40 males. For every 100 females age 18 and over, there were 84.80 males.

The median income for a household in the county was $27,868, and the median income for a family was $35,114. Males had a median income of $25,234 versus $16,250 for females. The per capita income for the county was $15,513. About 4.90% of families and 6.90% of the population were below the poverty line, including 5.30% of those under age 18 and 13.10% of those age 65 or over.

== Communities ==
=== Village ===
- Mullen (county seat)

== Politics ==
Hooker County voters have been overwhelmingly Republican ever since World War II. The last Democratic presidential candidate to carry the county was Franklin D. Roosevelt in 1932 when the region was decimated by the Dust Bowl, and in no presidential election since 1936 has the Democratic nominee reached thirty percent of the county's vote – a record of Republican dominance equalled only by the Unionist Kentucky counties of Jackson and Clinton where no Democrat has passed thirty percent since before 1896. In 1968 Hooker was the nation's most Republican county, and it was in the top ten most Republican in 1960, 1976, and 1984.

United States presidential election results for Hooker County, Nebraska
Year	Republican		Democratic		Third party(ies)	
Year	No.	%	No.	%	No.	%
1900	37	44.58%	43	51.81%	3	3.61%
1904	72	69.23%	22	21.15%	10	9.62%
1908	100	50.76%	91	46.19%	6	3.05%
1912	103	34.22%	121	40.20%	77	25.58%
1916	109	32.25%	218	64.50%	11	3.25%
1920	230	63.54%	117	32.32%	15	4.14%
1924	176	40.00%	111	25.23%	153	34.77%
1928	355	76.02%	110	23.55%	2	0.43%
1932	162	31.70%	342	66.93%	7	1.37%
1936	288	59.75%	191	39.63%	3	0.62%
1940	403	73.27%	147	26.73%	0	0.00%
1944	330	76.21%	103	23.79%	0	0.00%
1948	249	74.33%	86	25.67%	0	0.00%
1952	411	85.09%	72	14.91%	0	0.00%
1956	368	85.19%	64	14.81%	0	0.00%
1960	443	86.19%	71	13.81%	0	0.00%
1964	335	70.97%	137	29.03%	0	0.00%
1968	350	87.94%	36	9.05%	12	3.02%
1972	394	88.34%	52	11.66%	0	0.00%
1976	326	76.35%	98	22.95%	3	0.70%
1980	386	81.78%	63	13.35%	23	4.87%
1984	433	87.83%	55	11.16%	5	1.01%
1988	378	80.25%	91	19.32%	2	0.42%
1992	283	62.20%	70	15.38%	102	22.42%
1996	308	59.92%	115	22.37%	91	17.70%
2000	317	77.51%	74	18.09%	18	4.40%
2004	392	85.03%	64	13.88%	5	1.08%
2008	355	81.05%	75	17.12%	8	1.83%
2012	330	83.54%	59	14.94%	6	1.52%
2016	355	85.13%	40	9.59%	22	5.28%
2020	376	85.07%	59	13.35%	7	1.58%
2024	369	86.42%	55	12.88%	3	0.70%

== See also ==
- National Register of Historic Places listings in Hooker County, Nebraska
