= Sustainable Beef =

Meatpacking plant in North Platte, Nebraska

Sustainable Beef LLC is a meatpacking plant in North Platte, Nebraska.

The company was designed as a response by ranchers to the pressures they face because the meatpacking industry had long been controlled by "the Big Four" meatpackers, JBS, Tyson, Cargill, and National Beef, who together as of 2025 processed 85% of cattle in the United States. It was founded by Nebraska cattle ranchers as a way to take control of their supply chain.

Startup hurdles included securing investment, securing a location, and recruiting workers willing to do meatpacking work. Walmart became an investor, acquiring a minority stake in 2022, as part of the company's plan to develop a network of such plants to supply its stores. Convincing a town to welcome a meatpacking plant was a crucial hurdle; Scottsbluff, Nebraska had rejected a similar meatpacking plant proposal due to concerns over attracting immigrant labor, and those concerns surfaced in North Platte. North Platte eventually went through with the project as a use for a city-owned retired sewage lagoon. The town also geared up for expected infrastructure needs and the arrival of new workers and their families.

The plant cost $400 million to build and began production in May 2025. It operates a single daytime shift, occupies 550,000 square feet (51,000 m^{2}), and is capable of processing 1500 head of cattle per day. Most of the product goes to Walmart to supply stores in the central US. Employment was expected to be 850 by the end of 2025.
