= North Platte, Nebraska =

North Platte
- City
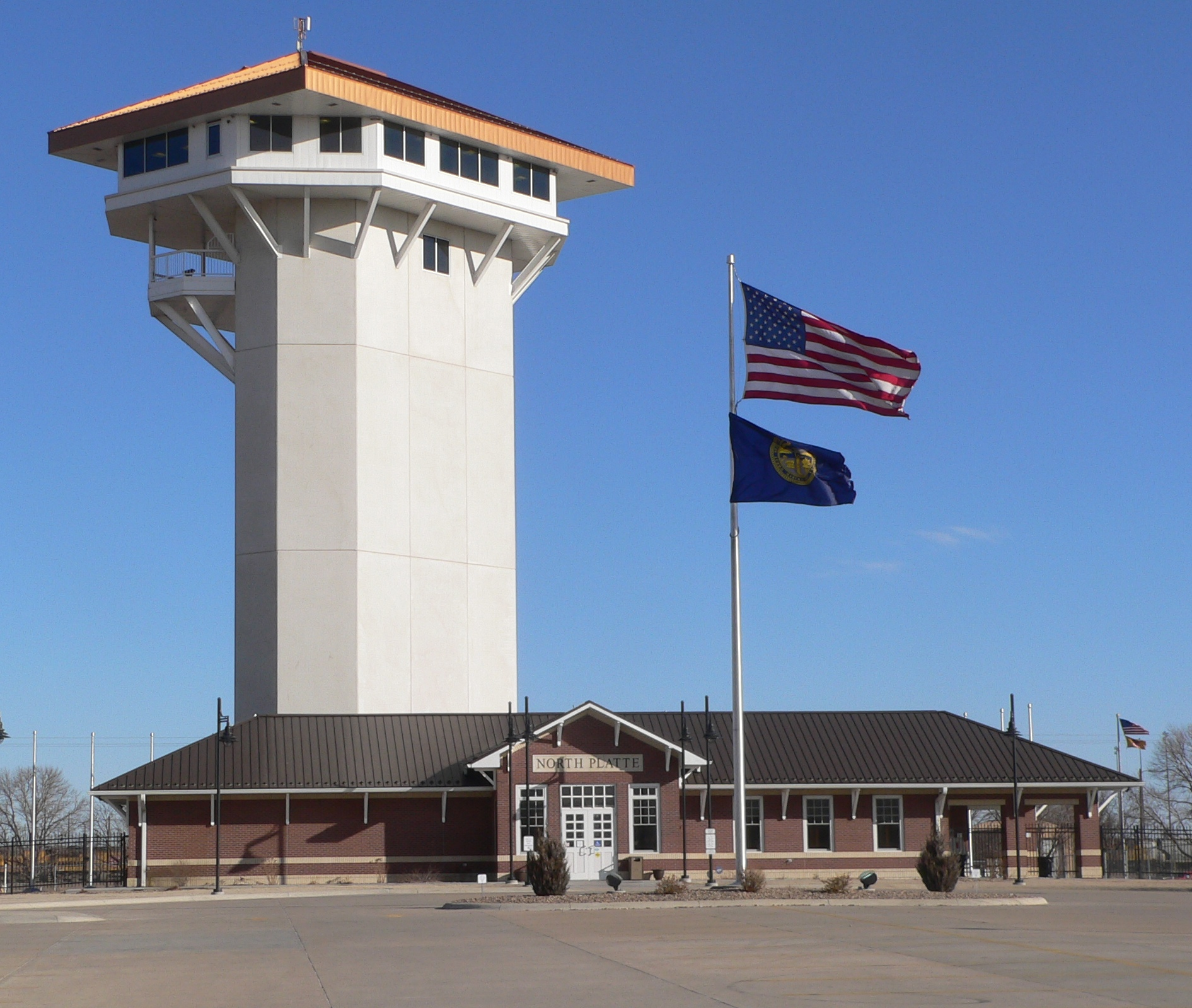
- Golden Spike Tower and Visitor Center at Union Pacific's Bailey Yards

- Logo

- Location of North Platte within Lincoln County and Nebraska

- Location within the United States
- Coordinates: 41°08′10″N 100°45′47″W
- Country: United States
- State: Nebraska
- County: Lincoln

Government
  - Mayor: Brandon Kelliher

Area
  - Total: 13.71 sq mi (35.50 km^{2})
  - Land: 13.52 sq mi (35.02 km^{2})
  - Water: 0.19 sq mi (0.48 km^{2})
- Elevation: 2,802 ft (854 m)

Population (2020)
  - Total: 23,390
  - Density: 1,729.9/sq mi (667.93/km^{2})
- Time zone: UTC−6 (Central (CST))
  - Summer (DST): UTC−5 (CDT)
- ZIP codes: 69101, 69103
- Area code: 308
- FIPS code: 31-35000
- GNIS feature ID: 2395260
- Website: northplattene.gov

North Platte is a city in and the county seat of Lincoln County, Nebraska, United States. It is located in the west-central part of the state, along Interstate 80, at the confluence of the North and South Platte Rivers forming the Platte River. The population was 23,390 at the 2020 census, making it the 11th most populous city in Nebraska.

North Platte is a railroad town; Union Pacific Railroad's large Bailey Yard is located within the city. Today, North Platte is served only by freight trains, but during World War II, the city was known for the North Platte Canteen, a volunteer organization serving food to millions of traveling soldiers.

North Platte is the principal city of the North Platte Micropolitan Statistical Area, which includes Lincoln, Logan, and McPherson counties.

== History ==
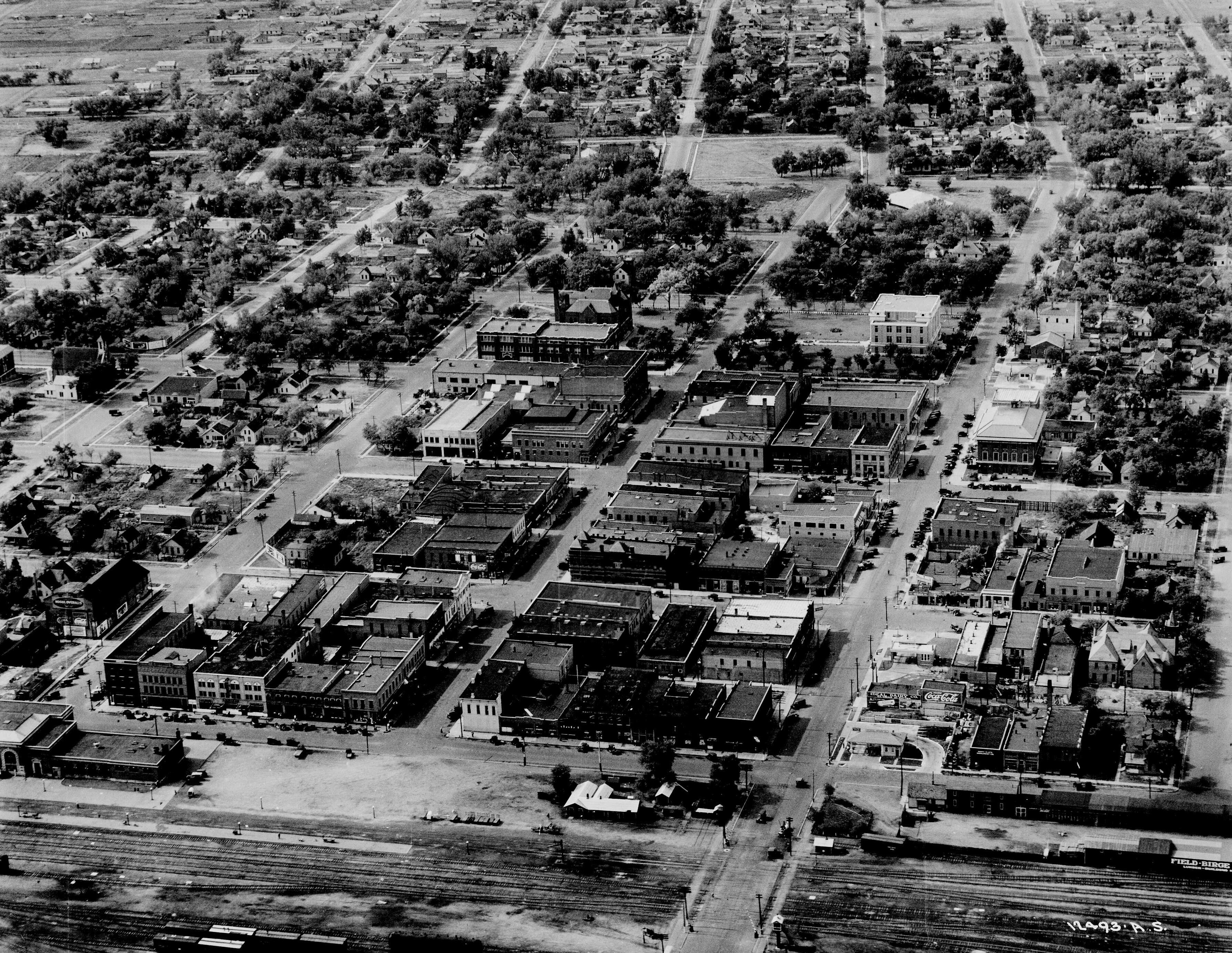
Aerial view of Downtown North Platte in 1925

North Platte was established in 1866 when the Union Pacific Railroad was extended to that point. It derives its name from the North Platte River.

North Platte was the western terminus of the Union Pacific Railway from December 1866 until the next section to Ogallala was opened the following year. Even though Congress had authorized the building of the Transcontinental Railroad in 1862, it had been extended only as far as Fremont, Nebraska, by the end of the 1865 construction season. The 275-mile (443 km) section from Fremont to North Platte was completed in 1866.

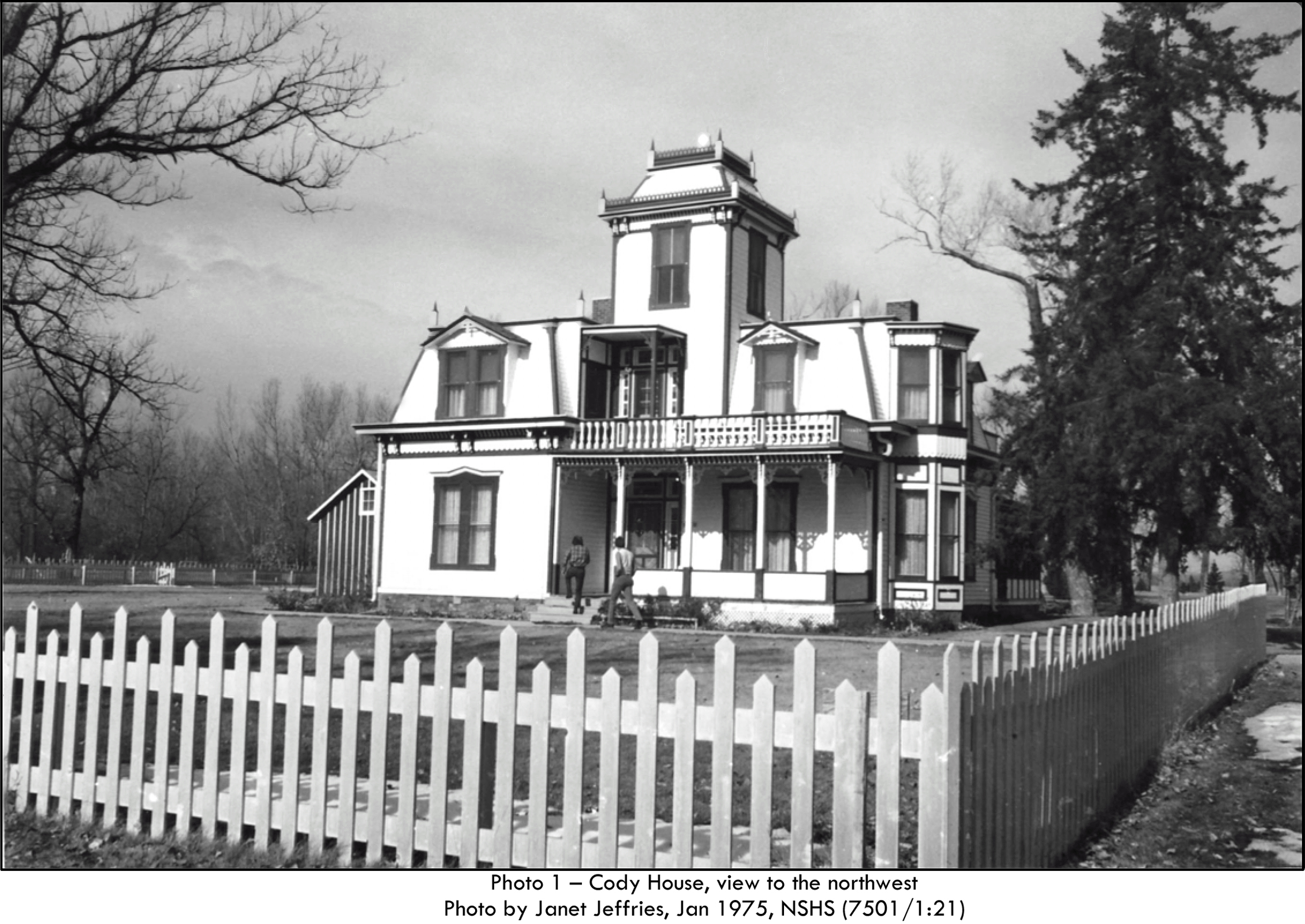
House at Scout's Rest Ranch

In the 1880s, Buffalo Bill Cody established his ranch, known as Scout's Rest Ranch, just north of town. It is now a National Historic Landmark.

On July 13, 1929, a Black man shot and killed a white police officer. The Black man reportedly took his own life, being trapped by a mob. This led to the formation of white mobs combing the city, and ordering Black residents to leave North Platte. Fearing mob violence, most of North Platte's Black residents fled.

External videos
- Lincoln County Museum, North Platte, Nebraska, Jim Griffin, 1:57, 27 July 2014
- History Bookshelf - Once Upon a Town, C-SPAN with Bob Greene, 50:06, 24 June 2002

The North Platte Canteen was one of the largest volunteer efforts of World War II, originating in 1941. Tens of thousands of volunteers from North Platte and surrounding towns met the troop trains passing through North Platte, offering coffee, sandwiches, dessert, and hospitality to nearly seven million servicemen.

== Geography ==
According to the United States Census Bureau, the city has a total area of 13.39 square miles (34.68 km^{2}), of which 13.20 square miles (34.19 km^{2}) is land and 0.19 square miles (0.49 km^{2}) is water.

=== Climate ===
Climate chart for North Platte

North Platte experiences a dry continental climate similar to that of the Nebraska High Plains, classified as hot-summer humid continental (Köppen Dwa, Trewartha Dcao), and, with an annual average precipitation of 21.08 inches (535 mm), barely avoids semi-arid classification; it is part of USDA Hardiness zone 5a. The normal monthly mean temperature ranges from 26.3 °F (−3.2 °C) in January to 75.6 °F (24.2 °C) in July. On an average year, there are 3.8 afternoons that reach 100 °F (37.8 °C) or higher, 39 afternoons that reach 90 °F (32.2 °C) or higher, 31.4 afternoons that do not climb above freezing, and 12.2 mornings with a low of 0 °F (−17.8 °C) or below. The average window for freezing temperatures is September 30 thru May 13, allowing a growing season of 139 days. Extreme temperatures officially range from −35 °F (−37.2 °C) on January 15, 1888, and February 12, 1899, up to 112 °F (44.4 °C) on July 11, 1954; the record cold daily maximum is −15 °F (−26.1 °C) on January 14, 1888, while, conversely, the record warm daily minimum is 80 °F (26.7 °C) on July 25, 1940.

Precipitation is greatest in May and June and has ranged from 10.01 inches (254.3 mm) in 1931 to 33.44 inches (849.4 mm) in 1951. Snowfall averages 29.6 inches (0.75 m) per season, and has historically ranged from 3.0 inches (0.08 m) in 1903–04 to 66.3 inches (1.68 m) in 1979–80; the average window for measurable (≥0.1 inches or 0.0025 metres) snowfall is November 1 through April 12, with May and October snow being rare.

Climate data for North Platte Regional Airport, Nebraska (1991–2020 normals, (Note: Mean monthly maxima and minima (i.e. the expected highest and lowest temperature readings at any point during the year or given month) calculated based on data at said location from 1991 to 2020.) extremes 1874–present) (Note: Official records for North Platte kept at downtown from September 1874 to December 1947 and at North Platte Regional Airport since January 1948.)
Month	Jan	Feb	Mar	Apr	May	Jun	Jul	Aug	Sep	Oct	Nov	Dec	Year
Record high °F (°C)	74 (23)	79 (26)	94 (34)	98 (37)	99 (37)	108 (42)	112 (44)	108 (42)	105 (41)	96 (36)	87 (31)	78 (26)	112 (44)
Mean maximum °F (°C)	62.6 (17.0)	66.7 (19.3)	77.9 (25.5)	84.8 (29.3)	90.0 (32.2)	96.9 (36.1)	100.6 (38.1)	97.9 (36.6)	95.3 (35.2)	86.3 (30.2)	73.9 (23.3)	63.7 (17.6)	102.0 (38.9)
Mean daily maximum °F (°C)	40.7 (4.8)	43.9 (6.6)	55.2 (12.9)	63.2 (17.3)	72.8 (22.7)	84.0 (28.9)	89.7 (32.1)	87.2 (30.7)	80.0 (26.7)	66.0 (18.9)	52.6 (11.4)	42.0 (5.6)	64.8 (18.2)
Daily mean °F (°C)	26.3 (−3.2)	29.4 (−1.4)	39.6 (4.2)	48.2 (9.0)	58.5 (14.7)	69.7 (20.9)	75.6 (24.2)	73.0 (22.8)	64.2 (17.9)	50.2 (10.1)	37.0 (2.8)	27.5 (−2.5)	49.9 (9.9)
Mean daily minimum °F (°C)	11.9 (−11.2)	14.8 (−9.6)	23.9 (−4.5)	33.2 (0.7)	44.2 (6.8)	55.4 (13.0)	61.4 (16.3)	58.8 (14.9)	48.3 (9.1)	34.3 (1.3)	21.4 (−5.9)	13.1 (−10.5)	35.1 (1.7)
Mean minimum °F (°C)	−8.2 (−22.3)	−5.1 (−20.6)	4.6 (−15.2)	17.1 (−8.3)	27.5 (−2.5)	41.4 (5.2)	49.5 (9.7)	46.9 (8.3)	31.7 (−0.2)	17.0 (−8.3)	4.3 (−15.4)	−5.1 (−20.6)	−14.5 (−25.8)
Record low °F (°C)	−35 (−37)	−35 (−37)	−25 (−32)	−3 (−19)	18 (−8)	29 (−2)	39 (4)	35 (2)	17 (−8)	4 (−16)	−25 (−32)	−34 (−37)	−35 (−37)
Average precipitation inches (mm)	0.39 (9.9)	0.57 (14)	1.00 (25)	2.29 (58)	3.35 (85)	3.54 (90)	3.18 (81)	2.56 (65)	1.61 (41)	1.65 (42)	0.49 (12)	0.45 (11)	21.08 (535)
Average snowfall inches (cm)	5.1 (13)	6.9 (18)	4.2 (11)	3.6 (9.1)	0.0 (0.0)	0.0 (0.0)	0.0 (0.0)	0.0 (0.0)	0.1 (0.25)	2.2 (5.6)	3.0 (7.6)	4.5 (11)	29.6 (75)
Average extreme snow depth inches (cm)	3.5 (8.9)	4.3 (11)	2.7 (6.9)	1.8 (4.6)	0.0 (0.0)	0.0 (0.0)	0.0 (0.0)	0.0 (0.0)	0.0 (0.0)	0.9 (2.3)	2.0 (5.1)	2.8 (7.1)	6.8 (17)
Average precipitation days (≥ 0.01 in)	4.4	5.3	6.5	9.0	11.5	10.8	10.2	8.9	6.7	6.8	4.2	3.7	88.0
Average snowy days (≥ 0.1 in)	4.3	4.3	3.4	2.2	0.1	0.0	0.0	0.0	0.1	0.9	2.1	3.6	21.0
Average relative humidity (%)	69.3	68.2	64.4	59.6	63.3	63.9	63.0	64.1	63.8	61.5	66.9	69.6	64.8
Average dew point °F (°C)	11.7 (−11.3)	16.3 (−8.7)	23.2 (−4.9)	32.2 (0.1)	43.9 (6.6)	53.8 (12.1)	58.8 (14.9)	56.8 (13.8)	46.8 (8.2)	34.2 (1.2)	23.0 (−5.0)	14.0 (−10.0)	34.5 (1.4)
Mean monthly sunshine hours	185.0	180.2	227.4	257.5	290.8	322.9	352.9	319.2	259.5	236.2	174.0	170.0	2,975.6
Percentage possible sunshine	62	60	61	64	65	71	77	75	69	69	59	59	67
Source: NOAA (relative humidity and sun 1961–1990)

See or edit raw graph data.

== Demographics ==
Historical population
Census	Pop.	Note	%±
1880	363		—
1890	3,055		741.6%
1900	3,640		19.1%
1910	4,793		31.7%
1920	10,466		118.4%
1930	12,061		15.2%
1940	12,429		3.1%
1950	15,433		24.2%
1960	17,184		11.3%
1970	19,447		13.2%
1980	24,509		26.0%
1990	22,605		−7.8%
2000	23,878		5.6%
2010	24,733		3.6%
2020	23,390		−5.4%
U.S. Decennial Census

=== 2020 census ===
As of the 2020 census, North Platte had a population of 23,390 and 10,202 households, including 6,061 families. The population density was 1,730.0 per square mile (667.9/km^{2}).

The median age was 39.9 years. 23.1% of residents were under the age of 18 and 19.7% were 65 years of age or older. For every 100 females, there were 97.4 males, and for every 100 females age 18 and over, there were 94.8 males age 18 and over.

There were 10,202 households in North Platte, of which 27.2% had children under the age of 18 living in them. Of all households, 41.8% were married-couple households, 22.1% were households with a male householder and no spouse or partner present, and 28.9% were households with a female householder and no spouse or partner present. About 36.0% of all households were made up of individuals and 15.5% had someone living alone who was 65 years of age or older. The average household size was 2.3 and the average family size was 2.9.

There were 11,350 housing units, of which 10.1% were vacant. The homeowner vacancy rate was 2.3% and the rental vacancy rate was 12.3%.

99.1% of residents lived in urban areas, while 0.9% lived in rural areas.

Racial composition as of the 2020 census
Race	Number	Percent
White	20,242	86.5%
Black or African American	384	1.6%
American Indian and Alaska Native	184	0.8%
Asian	268	1.1%
Native Hawaiian and Other Pacific Islander	6	0.0%
Some other race	725	3.1%
Two or more races	1,581	6.8%
Hispanic or Latino (of any race)	2,426	10.4%

=== 2016–2020 American Community Survey ===
The 2016–2020 5-year American Community Survey estimates show that the median household income was $52,653 (with a margin of error of +/- $5,357) and the median family income $67,702 (+/- $5,175). Males had a median income of $39,363 (+/- $4,731) versus $25,799 (+/- $1,263) for females. The median income for those above 16 years old was $31,772 (+/- $1,712). Approximately, 6.7% of families and 11.9% of the population were below the poverty line, including 11.8% of those under the age of 18 and 15.3% of those ages 65 or over.

=== 2010 census ===
As of the census of 2010, there were 24,733 people, 10,560 households, and 6,290 families residing in the city. The population density was 1,873.7 inhabitants per square mile (723.4/km^{2}). There were 11,450 housing units at an average density of 867.4 per square mile (334.9/km^{2}). The racial makeup of the city was 93.1% White, 1.0% African American, 0.7% Native American, 0.7% Asian, 2.8% from other races, and 1.7% from two or more races. Hispanic or Latino of any race were 8.8% of the population.

There were 10,560 households, of which 30.4% had children under the age of 18 living with them, 44.5% were married couples living together, 10.7% had a female householder with no husband present, 4.3% had a male householder with no wife present, and 40.4% were non-families. 34.8% of all households were made up of individuals, and 13.9% had someone living alone who was 65 years of age or older. The average household size was 2.29 and the average family size was 2.95.

The median age in the city was 37.1 years. 24.9% of residents were under the age of 18; 9% were between the ages of 18 and 24; 25% were from 25 to 44; 25.6% were from 45 to 64; and 15.5% were 65 years of age or older. The gender makeup of the city was 48.8% male and 51.2% female.

=== 2000 census ===
As of the census of 2000, there were 23,878 people, 9,944 households, and 6,224 families residing in the city. The population density was 2,281.5 people per square mile (880.9 people/km^{2}). There were 10,718 housing units at an average density of 1,024.1 per square mile (395.4/km^{2}). The racial makeup of the city was 93.47% White, 0.71% African American, 0.64% Native American, 0.39% Asian, 0.03% Pacific Islander, 3.30% from other races, and 1.45% from two or more races. Hispanic or Latino of any race were 6.68% of the population.

There were 9,944 households, out of which 31.0% had children under the age of 18 living with them, 49.8% were married couples living together, 9.6% had a female householder with no husband present, and 37.4% were non-families. 31.9% of all households were made up of individuals, and 13.0% had someone living alone who was 65 years of age or older. The average household size was 2.34 and the average family size was 2.97.

In the city, the population was spread out, with 26.0% under the age of 18, 9.5% from 18 to 24, 26.8% from 25 to 44, 21.9% from 45 to 64, and 15.8% who were 65 years of age or older. The median age was 36 years. For every 100 females, there were 94.5 males. For every 100 females age 18 and over, there were 90.0 males.

As of 2000, the median income for a household in the city was $34,181, and the median income for a family was $42,753. Males had a median income of $36,445 versus $20,157 for females. The per capita income for the city was $18,306. About 7.8% of families and 10.5% of the population were below the poverty line, including 13.2% of those under age 18 and 9.8% of those age 65 or over.

== Arts and culture ==
Lincoln County Historical Museum contains a display detailing the history of the North Platte Canteen. It also contains a Prairie Village with local landmark homes and other buildings, including a Pony Express station and pioneer church among many others.

Buffalo Bill Ranch State Historical Park is located near North Platte, a Nebraska living history park about "Buffalo Bill" Cody. The park includes his actual house known as Scout's Rest Ranch. The park is two miles west of U.S. Highway 83 along U.S. Highway 30.

Every June, North Platte hosts the annual "Nebraskaland Days". The event includes parades, art shows, rodeos, concerts, and food events. It draws over 100,000 attendees every year.

North Platte is host to the annual Miss Nebraska pageant taking place every June, an official preliminary for the Miss America Organization.

An independent professional baseball team, the North Platte 80s, began play in 2024 in the Pecos League. North Platte was also the prior home the minor league baseball North Platte Indians of the Nebraska State League.

== Infrastructure ==
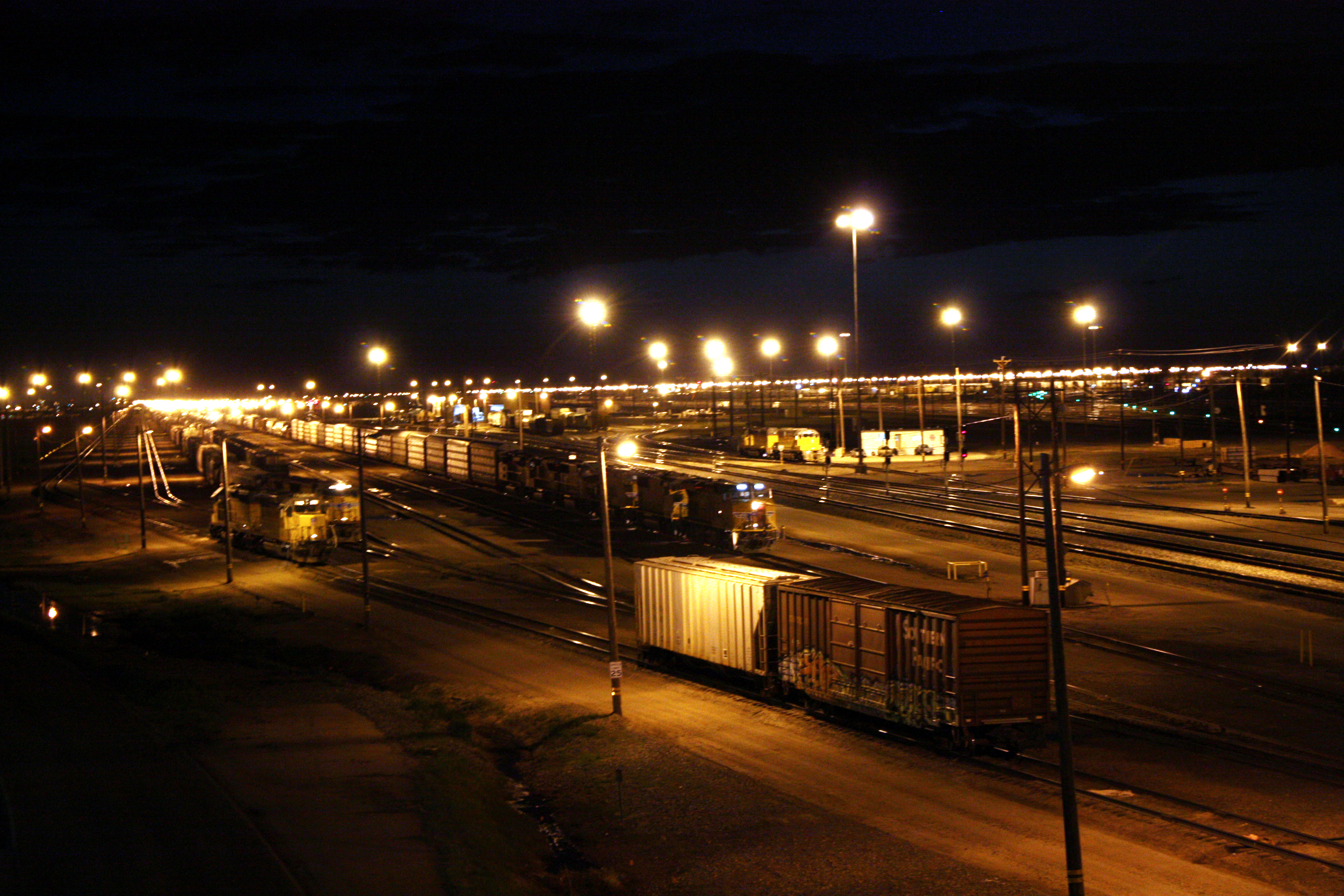
Bailey Yard at night

=== Transportation ===
North Platte is home to the world's largest rail yard, Bailey Yard. The Golden Spike Tower and Visitor Center is an eight-story building which overlooks the expansive classification yard and engine facilities. The tower and visitor center are open to the public year-round. Passenger train service was discontinued in 1971.

North Platte is home to North Platte Regional Airport. United Express serves the airport with twice-daily service to Denver International Airport. There is also a door-to-door bus system available for residents of the town.

Intercity bus service to the city is provided by Burlington Trailways and Express Arrow.

North Platte is served by two major cross-country U.S. highways and Interstate 80. I-80 runs south of the South Platte River through the outer edge of town. Much of the town's commercial area has moved to the intersection of I-80 and U.S. Route 83, which runs north to downtown, and continues to points as far north as Canada or south to Mexico. U.S. Route 30 intersects with U.S. 83 downtown and follows the north side of the Platte/South Platte River from east to west.

== Economy ==
Union Pacific is the city’s largest employer, with more than 1,700 workers. Great Plains Health employs about 1,300. The Sustainable Beef meatpacking plant, which opened in May 2025, was expected to employ 850 by the end of the year. A Walmart distribution center employs about 600.

A previous major employer, Consolidated Freightways, relocated employees to Las Vegas and Lincoln in 1980.

== Notable people ==
- Melissa Carper, professional country singer and songwriter raised in North Platte. She released her first solo album in 2021, featuring Sierra Ferrell.
- Chris Başak, baseball infielder was born in North Platte. He played in the New York Mets, Minnesota Twins and New York Yankees organizations. He made five appearances in the major leagues in 2007 with the Yankees, going 0-for-1.
- Howard Baskerville, American teacher in the Presbyterian mission school in Tabriz, Iran; born in North Platte. He was killed defending the Constitutional Revolution of Iran and known as "American Martyr of the Constitutional Revolution."
- Buffalo Bill Cody, iconic Wild West showman, owned a ranch in North Platte.
- Nathan Enderle, football quarterback, selected by the Chicago Bears in the fifth round of the 2011 NFL draft; born in North Platte and attended North Platte High School.
- Paul Faulkner (1913–1997), artist; born in North Platte.
- Chuck Hagel, Nebraska U.S. Senator and U.S. Secretary of Defense; born in North Platte.
- Bill Hayes, baseball player, lived in North Platte and attended Saint Patrick's High School.
- Henry Hill (1943–2012), New York City mobster; worked as a cook in North Platte.
- Evelyn Hooker, (1907-1996) Psychologist and research professor at UCLA known for her research challenging the classification of homosexuality as a mental disorder; born in North Platte.
- John Howell, former American football safety in the National Football League, played for the Tampa Bay Buccaneers and Seattle Seahawks; born in North Platte.
- Glenn Miller, popular big band leader; lived in North Platte for one year during his early childhood.
- Keith Neville, 18th governor of Nebraska; born in North Platte.
- Joe Ragland (born 1989), American-Liberian basketball player for Hapoel Holon of the Israeli Basketball Premier League
- Red Cloud, Sioux warrior; born near North Platte in 1822.
- Dr. Don Rose, San Francisco Bay Area disc jockey; born and raised in North Platte and frequently referred to the city on his morning show.
- Ryan Schultz, professional mixed martial artist, Lightweight Champion of defunct IFL; raised in North Platte.
- Zane Smith, professional baseball player, was a two-sport athlete for North Platte 1978–79, before spending 13 years in major league baseball.
- Danny Woodhead, retired NFL running back; born in North Platte and attended North Platte High School.

== See also ==
- National Register of Historic Places in Lincoln County, Nebraska
