= Sand Hills Golf Club =

Golf club in Mullen, Nebraska, United States

- Location within the United States Location within Nebraska
- 41°51′24″N 101°5′27″W

Club information
- Location: Mullen, Nebraska
- Established: 1994
- Type: Private
- Tota holes: 18
- Designed by: Bill Coore and Ben Crenshaw
- Par: 71
- Length: 7,089 yd

Sand Hills Golf Club is a golf club in Mullen, Nebraska, United States. Notable for its remote location and minimalist design among the sandhills of Nebraska, it is consistently ranked among the top golf courses in the world and the best courses designed since 1960, notably being named #1 in Golfweek magazine's 2022 list of the "Top 200 Modern Courses", defined as courses built no earlier than 1960, in the United States. The golf course architecture website Golf Club Atlas called it "the most natural course built in the United States since World War I".

== Course history and design ==
Because of Nebraska's unique topography, course architects Bill Coore and Ben Crenshaw moved only 4,000 cubic yards (3,100 m^{3}) of earth when designing the course. Lincoln developer Dick Youngscap surveyed several thousand acres of land in 1990 and worked with Coore and Crenshaw to survey the land and find an ideal spot for the course. During two years of surveying the land, Coore and Crenshaw found over 130 "natural golf holes" on the property—defined as locations that had well-defined areas that could easily be converted into teeing areas, fairways, hazards, and greens. They spent much of that time narrowing the list of possible holes to 18 and determining an ideal course routing. At one point during the design phase, when Coore and Crenshaw were making little headway on a routing, Crenshaw stepped over a boundary fence and found a parcel of land that he saw as ideal, reporting back to Coore that he should see this particular parcel. Soon thereafter, Youngscap arranged a land swap with the owner of the adjacent parcel, which today contains the 12th through 15th holes. The course itself covers 130 acres (53 ha).

$1.2 million was spent building the course, far less than other highly rated modern golf courses. One major source of savings came about when soil analysis found that the sand on the property had perfectly round grains—making it essentially identical to the "USGA greens mix", a special type of sandy soil that the United States Golf Association considers ideal for the needs of a golf green. At the time the course was being constructed, the average cost to build a green to USGA specifications was around $40,000, including not only the cost of the soil itself but also installing drainage systems. Because the ideal soil was already present, the greens required no drainage, making the cost to build all 18 greens less than $6,000. By itself, this reduced the course cost by over $700,000.

Ranking among the most exclusive courses in the United States, the club reportedly has fewer than 200 members from across the country, almost none of whom reside in 500-person Mullen. Most members fly into Denver, Omaha, or nearby North Platte when playing at the course and stay in the on-site accommodations that can host about 55 people.

Youngscap's influence on Mike Keiser's development of Bandon Dunes Golf Resort is well documented.

== Course details ==
Tee	Rating/Slope	1	2	3	4	5	6	7	8	9	Out	10	11	12	13	14	15	16	17	18	In	Total
Par		5	4	3	4	4	3	4	4	4	35	4	4	4	3	5	4	5	3	4	36	71
Black		549	458	216	485	412	198	283	367	402	3370	472	408	417	216	508	469	612	150	467	3719	7089
