= Mullen, Nebraska =

- Village
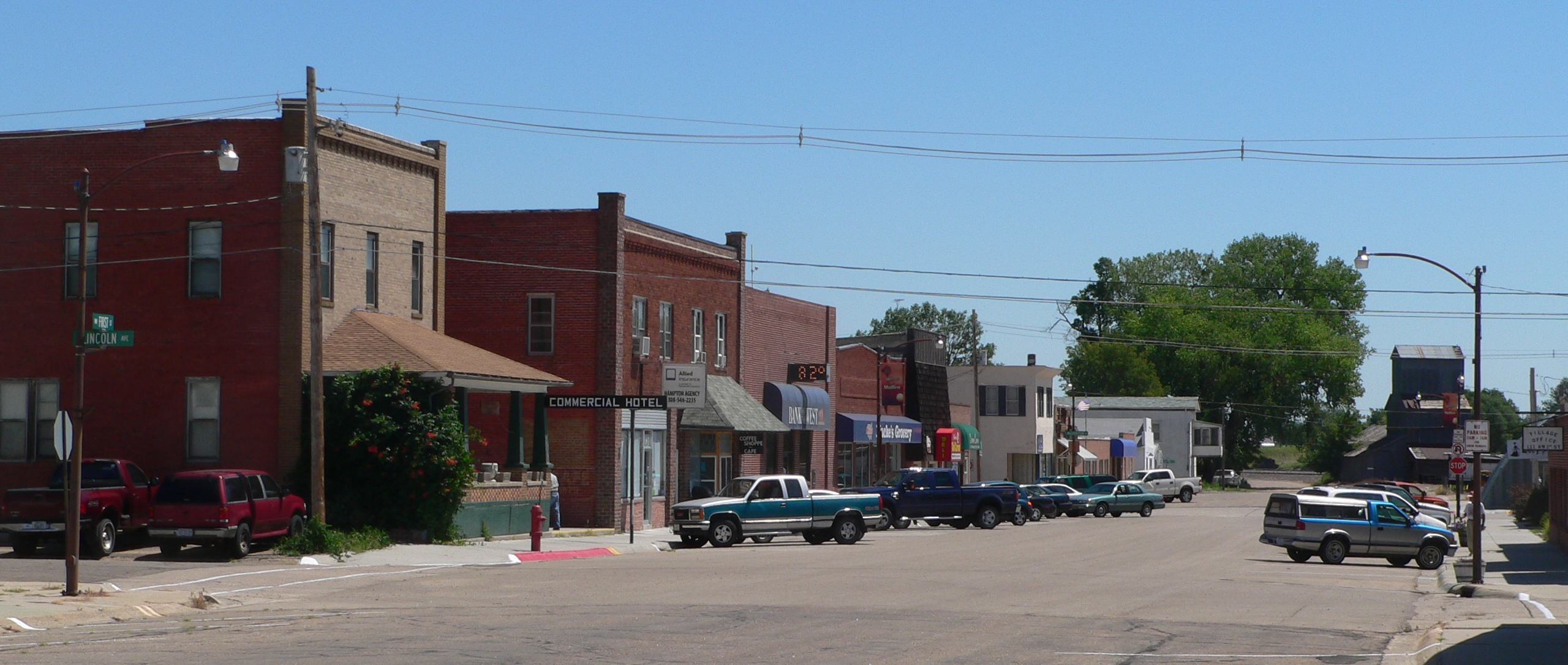
- Downtown Mullen: First Street

- Location of Mullen, Nebraska
- Coordinates: 42°02′35″N 101°02′40″W
- Country: United States
- State: Nebraska
- County: Hooker

Area
  - Total: 0.41 sq mi (1.07 km^{2})
  - Land: 0.41 sq mi (1.07 km^{2})
  - Water: 0 sq mi (0.00 km^{2})
- Elevation: 3,209 ft (978 m)

Population (2020)
  - Total: 500
  - Density: 1,211.2/sq mi (467.65/km^{2})
- Time zone: UTC-7 (Mountain (MST))
  - Summer (DST): UTC-6 (MDT)
- ZIP code: 69152
- Area code: 308
- FIPS code: 31-33250
- GNIS feature ID: 2399425
- Website: www.villageofmullen.gov

Mullen is a village in Hooker County, Nebraska, United States. As of the 2020 census, Mullen had a population of 500. It is the county seat of Hooker County.

== History ==
Mullen was laid out in 1888 when the railroad was extended to that point. It was named for Charles Mullen, a railroad official. The only settlement in Hooker County, Mullen was designated the county seat and the first courthouse was completed in 1889. Mullen was incorporated as a village in 1907.

== Geography ==
Mullen is located in the Nebraska Sandhills.

According to the United States Census Bureau, the village has a total area of 0.47 square miles (1.22 km^{2}), all land. Mullen was named after Charles D. Mullen of Lincoln. At that time, Mullen was Chief Clerk for Mr. D.E. Thompson, Division Superintendent of the CB&Q Railroad.

=== Climate ===
Climate data for Mullen 3S, Nebraska (1991–2020 normals, extremes 1895–present)
Month	Jan	Feb	Mar	Apr	May	Jun	Jul	Aug	Sep	Oct	Nov	Dec	Year
Record high °F (°C)	74 (23)	77 (25)	87 (31)	100 (38)	104 (40)	108 (42)	111 (44)	110 (43)	102 (39)	94 (34)	82 (28)	74 (23)	111 (44)
Mean maximum °F (°C)	57.6 (14.2)	61.9 (16.6)	76.4 (24.7)	82.9 (28.3)	86.5 (30.3)	94.8 (34.9)	96.1 (35.6)	95.5 (35.3)	94.2 (34.6)	84.0 (28.9)	72.4 (22.4)	61.1 (16.2)	97.8 (36.6)
Mean daily maximum °F (°C)	36.9 (2.7)	39.3 (4.1)	50.2 (10.1)	58.9 (14.9)	68.6 (20.3)	79.9 (26.6)	86.0 (30.0)	84.1 (28.9)	76.4 (24.7)	61.5 (16.4)	48.9 (9.4)	37.8 (3.2)	60.7 (15.9)
Daily mean °F (°C)	25.8 (−3.4)	28.1 (−2.2)	37.5 (3.1)	46.3 (7.9)	56.7 (13.7)	67.4 (19.7)	73.3 (22.9)	71.3 (21.8)	62.7 (17.1)	48.9 (9.4)	36.8 (2.7)	27.0 (−2.8)	48.5 (9.2)
Mean daily minimum °F (°C)	14.8 (−9.6)	16.9 (−8.4)	24.9 (−3.9)	33.7 (0.9)	44.7 (7.1)	54.9 (12.7)	60.6 (15.9)	58.4 (14.7)	49.0 (9.4)	36.3 (2.4)	24.7 (−4.1)	16.3 (−8.7)	36.3 (2.4)
Mean minimum °F (°C)	−10.2 (−23.4)	−6.1 (−21.2)	4.3 (−15.4)	18.4 (−7.6)	27.8 (−2.3)	44.3 (6.8)	47.8 (8.8)	46.4 (8.0)	33.4 (0.8)	16.5 (−8.6)	4.6 (−15.2)	−5.2 (−20.7)	−14.8 (−26.0)
Record low °F (°C)	−35 (−37)	−38 (−39)	−22 (−30)	−11 (−24)	15 (−9)	31 (−1)	38 (3)	33 (1)	18 (−8)	2 (−17)	−14 (−26)	−31 (−35)	−38 (−39)
Average precipitation inches (mm)	0.36 (9.1)	0.52 (13)	1.33 (34)	2.57 (65)	3.81 (97)	3.95 (100)	3.95 (100)	2.27 (58)	2.56 (65)	1.85 (47)	0.65 (17)	0.43 (11)	24.25 (616)
Average snowfall inches (cm)	4.6 (12)	8.2 (21)	5.8 (15)	7.7 (20)	0.8 (2.0)	0.0 (0.0)	0.0 (0.0)	0.0 (0.0)	0.0 (0.0)	1.8 (4.6)	5.2 (13)	7.7 (20)	41.8 (106)
Average precipitation days (≥ 0.01 in)	3.8	4.8	5.8	8.6	11.5	10.2	9.5	7.1	6.5	6.0	3.9	3.9	81.6
Average snowy days (≥ 0.1 in)	3.8	4.8	3.2	2.3	0.5	0.0	0.0	0.0	0.0	1.1	2.5	4.1	22.3
Source: NOAA

== Demographics ==
Historical population
Census	Pop.	Note	%±
1920	499		—
1930	524		5.0%
1940	725		38.4%
1950	652		−10.1%
1960	811		24.4%
1970	667		−17.8%
1980	720		7.9%
1990	554		−23.1%
2000	491		−11.4%
2010	509		3.7%
2020	500		−1.8%
U.S. Decennial Census

=== 2010 census ===
As of the census of 2010, there were 509 people, 232 households, and 139 families residing in the village. The population density was 1,083.0 inhabitants per square mile (418.1/km^{2}). There were 293 housing units at an average density of 623.4 per square mile (240.7/km^{2}). The racial makeup of the village was 98.4% White, 0.8% Native American, and 0.8% from two or more races. Hispanic or Latino of any race were 1.4% of the population.

There were 232 households, of which 23.7% had children under the age of 18 living with them, 51.3% were married couples living together, 6.5% had a female householder with no husband present, 2.2% had a male householder with no wife present, and 40.1% were non-families. 37.9% of all households were made up of individuals, and 20.7% had someone living alone who was 65 years of age or older. The average household size was 2.08 and the average family size was 2.76.

The median age in the village was 50.9 years. 20.6% of residents were under the age of 18; 4.8% were between the ages of 18 and 24; 17.6% were from 25 to 44; 27.9% were from 45 to 64; and 29.1% were 65 years of age or older. The gender makeup of the village was 47.0% male and 53.0% female.

=== 2000 census ===
As of the census of 2000, there were 491 people, 236 households, and 139 families residing in the village. The population density was 1,307.8 inhabitants per square mile (504.9/km^{2}). There were 309 housing units at an average density of 823.0 per square mile (317.8/km^{2}). The racial makeup of the village was 98.78% White, 0.41% Native American, 0.20% Asian, 0.20% from other races, and 0.41% from two or more races. Hispanic or Latino of any race were 1.22% of the population.

There were 236 households, out of which 22.0% had children under the age of 18 living with them, 53.0% were married couples living together, 5.5% had a female householder with no husband present, and 41.1% were non-families. 39.8% of all households were made up of individuals, and 22.9% had someone living alone who was 65 years of age or older. The average household size was 2.08 and the average family size was 2.81.

In the village, the population was spread out, with 22.4% under the age of 18, 3.7% from 18 to 24, 21.4% from 25 to 44, 24.2% from 45 to 64, and 28.3% who were 65 years of age or older. The median age was 47 years. For every 100 females, there were 85.3 males. For every 100 females age 18 and over, there were 81.4 males.

As of 2000 the median income for a household in the village was $26,989, and the median income for a family was $34,375. Males had a median income of $25,625 versus $16,375 for females. The per capita income for the village was $16,532. About 2.8% of families and 5.5% of the population were below the poverty line, including 2.7% of those under age 18 and 11.5% of those age 65 or over.

== Arts and culture ==
=== Annual cultural events ===
The Sandhills Journey Scenic Byway Polar Bear Tank Race is held each winter. Teams race down the Middle Loup River in eight foot stock tanks.

The Sharptail Shootout is held each year in September and is a timed competition for hunters to see who can bag the largest number of grouse with the least shots fired. The event has been held for more than twenty-five years.

=== Museums and other points of interest ===
The Hooker County Historical Museum has many exhibits including a display of the area’s wartime and peacetime military.

=== Newspaper ===
Mullen is home to the Hooker County Tribune, a weekly broadsheet newspaper.

== Parks and recreation ==
The Sand Hills Golf Club located outside Mullen ranks as one of the top courses in the world according to Golf Magazine's World Top 100.

== Education ==
Mullen is part of the Mullen Public Schools School District. The district has an elementary school and high school. Students attend Mullen High School.

== Transportation ==
There are no scheduled commercial flights that fly into Mullen or into Hooker County. The nearest airports with regular airline service are in North Platte and Alliance.

== Media ==
The Hooker County Tribune is published in Mullen. It is a weekly newspaper featuring local news and events.

== Notable people ==
- Justin McBride, 2005 & 2007 PBR World Champion and country music singer
- John Howell, safety on 2003 NFL Super Bowl Champion Tampa Bay Buccaneers
