= North Platte Canteen =

Railroad stop in North Platte, Nebraska, United States

General information
- Location: North Platte, Nebraska; United States
- Coordinates: 41.13935°N 100.76°W

History
- Opened: December 25, 1941
- Closed: April 1, 1946
Location

Location in the United States
Location in Nebraska

The North Platte Canteen (also known as the Service Men's Canteen in the Union Pacific Railroad station at North Platte) was a railroad stop served by local citizens of North Platte, Nebraska, United States, that operated from Christmas Day 1941 to April 1, 1946.

Located along the tracks of the Union Pacific Railroad, its purpose was to provide refreshments and hospitality to soldiers who were traveling through the area on the way to war during their ten- to fifteen-minute stopovers. During its run, nearly 55,000 Nebraska women served almost seven million soldiers on their way to fight in World War II.

== History ==
=== Beginnings ===
The history of the canteen can first be traced back to December 17, 1941. Just ten days after the Attack on Pearl Harbor, men of the 134th Infantry Regiment of the Nebraska National Guard were on their way from Camp Joseph T. Robinson, near Little Rock, Arkansas to an unknown destination. Rumor had it that the train would arrive at 11:00, but by noon it had not shown up. After another false alarm, the train finally rolled in around 16:30. By this time, at least five hundred relatives and friends of local servicemen had shown up at the depot. The crowd cheered, but the soldiers were not members of the 134th. The crowd gave them the gifts and food that was originally meant for their own sons and wished them off.

The reason that the train stopped in North Platte was because the town was a designated tender point for steam trains. Stopping the train allowed for the train crews to relubricate the wheels, top off the water levels in the tanks, and other tasks for the maintenance of the locomotive. This practice continued until the Union Pacific Railroad switched to diesel locomotives.

=== Start of the canteen ===
Of the group of people that were originally at the depot on the seventeenth, twenty-six-year-old Rae Wilson, a drugstore saleswoman, witnessed the hospitality. Her brother supposedly was to be on the troop train as a company commander. As she walked away from the train that evening, she had an idea to meet all the trains that went through North Platte and give the soldiers the same type of sendoff. The next day she suggested that the meeting of soldiers become a permanent occurrence. She also wrote a letter to The Daily Bulletin:

Editor, The Daily Bulletin:

I don't know just how many people went to meet the trains when the troops went thru our city Wednesday, but those who didn't should have.

To see the spirits and the high morale among those soldiers should certainly put some of us on our feet and make us realize we are really at war. We should help keep this soldiers morale at its highest peak. We can do our part.

During World War I the army and navy mothers, or should I say the war mothers, had canteens at our own depot. Why can't we, the people of North Platte and other towns surrounding our community, start a fund and open a Canteen now? I would be more than willing to give my time without charge and run this canteen.

We who met this troop train which arrived about 5 o'clock were expecting Nebraska boys. Naturally we had candy, cigarettes, etc., but we very willingly gave these things to the Kansas boys.

Smiles, tears and laughter followed. Appreciation showed on over 300 faces. An officer told me it was the first time anyone had met their train and that North Platte had helped the boys keep up their spirits.

I say get back of our sons and other mothers' sons 100 per cent. Let's do something and do it in a hurry! We can help this way when we can't help any other way.

-Rae Wilson

The next day she began work on the canteen. Calls to merchants came with requests for cigarettes and tobacco, while housewives were asked to contribute cake and cookies, with attempts to get the younger women to hand out the gifts and keep conversation up with the soldiers. The first meeting was held on December 22 for the canteen committee. Three days later, on Christmas day, the next train pulled into the city, surprising the young men who were expecting just another boring stop. At first, the women worked out of the nearby Cody Hotel. They were later allowed to move into a shack by the side of the tracks by the railroad company when a woman became friendly with the president of the Union Pacific. Eventually the movement grew and people from multiple organizations in surrounding communities began to contribute.

After a while, the women began to serve a thousand men a day, with those who were celebrating a birthday getting their own cake and a singing of "Happy Birthday". Once, a serviceman lied about his birthday, but gave his cake to a boy suffering from polio after becoming grief-stricken.

=== Donations and sustainment ===
The goodness of random strangers helped to keep up the canteen. Donations include a coffee importer who sent a twenty five pound can of coffee, a woman who consumed food and later sent a check for two hundred dollars, and others. A fall scrap drive donated two thirds of its income to the canteen. Even the priest of the local Roman Catholic church, after donating twelve turkeys and hearing that they were consumed, personally transported his turkey over to the canteen. Expenses for the canteen averaged about two hundred and twenty five dollars a week.

Over one hundred and twenty five communities donated their time to work at the canteen. Some people travelled as far as two hundred miles to take turns on regularly appointed days. The groups also took responsibility in supplying food for the day. If a group was too small, multiple ones would band together and help fulfill the daily requirements. Benefit dances, pie socials, and other activities were held to also help raise money for the canteen. The youth also contributed to the workload, cleaning floors and raising money in all ways possible to support the troops. One girl remembers writing their addresses onto the packaging of popcorn balls so that the troops would have someone to write to. One twelve-year-old boy even sold his pets, toys, and the shirt off his back and donated the money to the cause. The railroad company got into the giving by donating a dishwasher and coffee urns.

=== End of the war and closing ===
At the end of the war, the canteen continued to operate as men were returning home. Eventually it closed on April 1, 1946, having served over six million servicemen and women. Sixteen trains were scheduled on the final day and regular Monday workers were in charge along with Lutheran Church women from North Platte, and Gothenburg, Nebraska. They would work from five in the morning until midnight, as they did not know when the troop trains would come through because their movements were secret. Food was also donated during a time of rationing so that the soldiers could experience a taste of home of sorts.

Finances raised over the four and a half years: $137,884.72

1942: $10,429.83
1943: $23,417.45
1944: $42,931.20
1945: $51,565.35
