= United States Golf Teachers Cup =

Golf tournament

The United States Golf Teachers Cup is the national championship event of the United States Golf Teachers Federation. It is played annually at different venues around the United States, and is a 36-hole stroke-play event. The championship is open to all members in good standing of the World Golf Teachers Federation.

== Past champions ==
- 2026 Matthew Abramson
- 2025 Mitchell Chang
- 2024 Ken Kim
- 2023 Ken Kim
- 2022 Ben Martin
- 2021 Alejandro Duque
- 2020 No Tournament
- 2019 Hunter Huang
- 2018 Mark Harman
- 2017 Matt Smith
- 2016 Mark Harman
- 2015 Bill Hardwick
- 2014 David Belling
- 2013 Grant Gulych
- 2012 Bill Hardwick
- 2011 James Douris
- 2010 Christopher Richards
- 2009 James Douris
- 2008 Jerry Moore
- 2007 James Douris
- 2006 James Douris
- 2005 Mark Harman
- 2004 David Belling
- 2003 Mark Harman
- 2002 Mark Harman
- 2001 Mark Harman
- 2000 Mark Umphreyville
- 1999 Brian Lamberti
- 1998 Mark Harman
- 1997 Shawn Clement
- 1996 Faisal Qureshi
