= North Platte Regional Airport =

Airport in North Platte, Nebraska, USA

North Platte Regional Airport Lee Bird Field
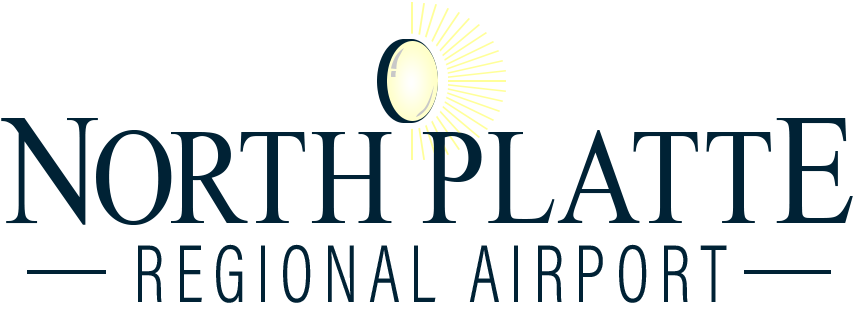

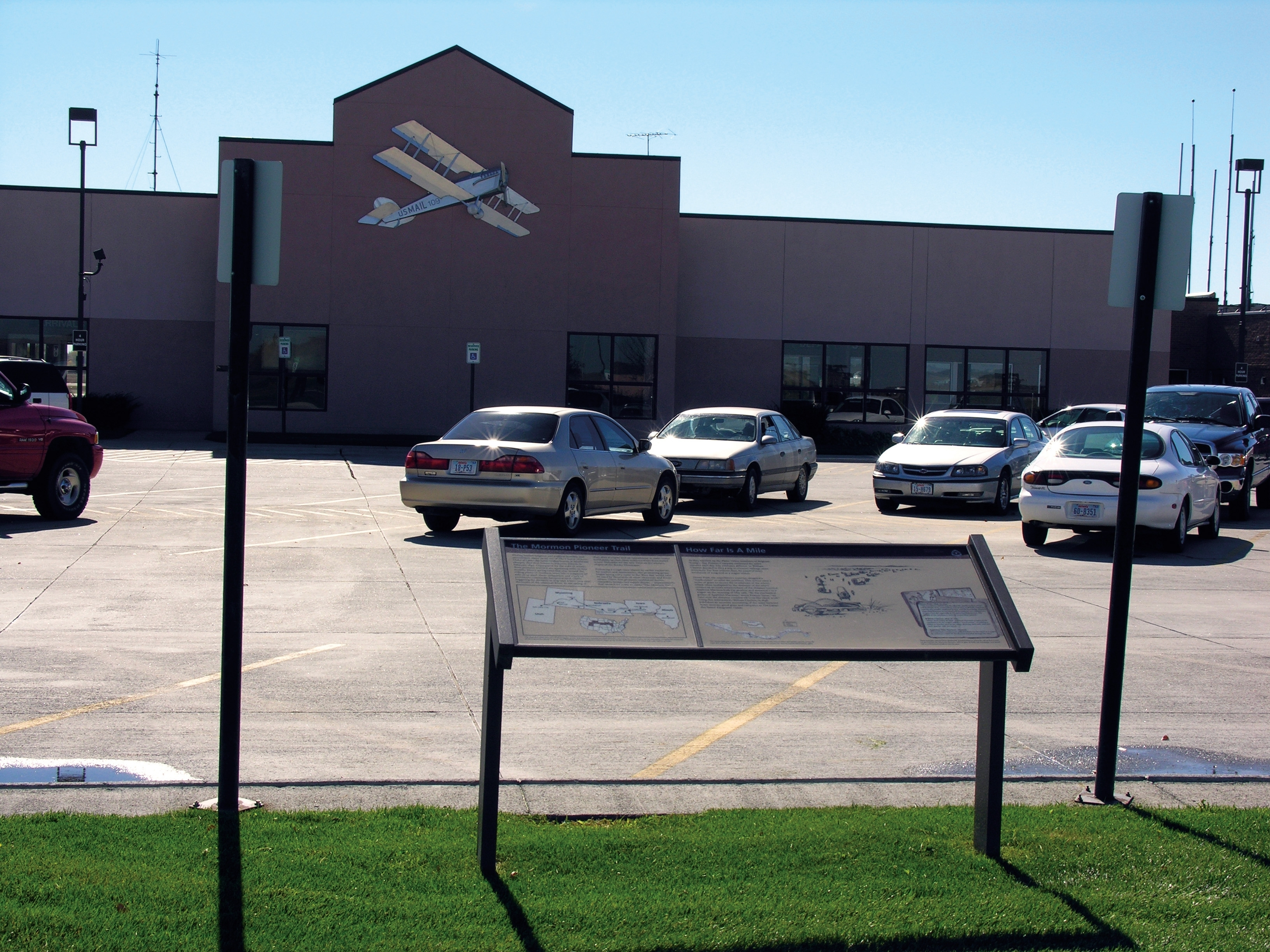
- IATA: LBF; ICAO: KLBF; FAA LID: LBF

Summary
- Airport type: Public
- Owner: North Platte Airport Authority
- Serves: North Platte, Nebraska
- Elevation AMSL: 2,777 ft (846 m)
- Coordinates: 41°07′34″N 100°41′01″W
- Website: www.northplatteairport.com

Maps
- FAA Airport Diagram
- Interactive map of North Platte Regional Airport

Runways
Direction	Length		Surface
Direction	ft	m	Surface
12/30	8,001	2,439	Concrete
17/35	4,436	1,352	Asphalt

Statistics (2020)
- Passengers: 32,000
- Aircraft operations: 28,300
- Based aircraft: 42
- Source: Bureau of Transportation Statistics, Federal Aviation Administration

North Platte Regional Airport (IATA: LBF, ICAO: KLBF, FAA LID: LBF) (Lee Bird Field) is a public airport three miles east of North Platte, in Lincoln County, Nebraska. It is owned by the North Platte Airport Authority and sees one airline, subsidized by the Essential Air Service program.

The Federal Aviation Administration says the airport had 10,288 passenger enplanements in calendar year 2008, 7,924 in 2009 and 8,391 in 2010. It is included in the Federal Aviation Administration (FAA) National Plan of Integrated Airport Systems for 2019–2023, in which it is categorized as a regional primary commercial service facility.

== History ==
North Platte Regional Airport was originally North Platte Field and was built in 1921 with private funds. The original location was the east side of the North Platte River near the river bridge south of U.S. Highway 30. The first hangar and terminal buildings were built there. The airport was the site of the first night airmail flight, on February 22, 1921. The field was lit using burning fuel barrels and the plane landed at 7:48 p.m. and left for Omaha at 10:44 p.m. after repairs to the de Havilland 4.

In 1929 the City of North Platte bought the airfield and leased it to the Boeing Transport Company, an original part of United Airlines. More construction was done in 1941 and the site became the site of a B-17 training command. The same year the airport was renamed Lee Bird Field after Lee Bird, the son of a North Platte family, who was killed in 1918 while training as a pilot for World War I. The Airport Authority began operating the airport in July 1963, and the airport was renamed the North Platte Regional Airport Lee Bird Field in June 1992.

United Airlines stopped at North Platte from the 1930s until Frontier took over in 1959; Frontier's 737s left in 1984.

== Facilities ==
The airport covers 1,544 acres (625 ha) at an elevation of 2,777 feet (846 m). It has two runways: 12/30 is 8,001 by 150 feet (2,439 x 46 m) concrete; 17/35 is 4,436 by 100 feet (1,352 x 30 m) asphalt.

In the year ending December 31, 2018 the airport had 28,300 aircraft operations, average 77 per day: 82% general aviation, 12% air taxi, 5% airline, and 2% military. In April 2020, there were 42 aircraft based at this airport: 38 single-engine, 2 multi-engine, 1 jet, and 1 helicopter.

== Airlines and destinations ==
=== Passenger ===
Airlines	Destinations
United Express	Denver

=== Cargo ===
The following airlines offer scheduled cargo service:

Airlines	Destinations
FedEx Feeder operated by Baron Aviation	Omaha

Destinations map
Destinations from North Platte Regional Airport

== See also ==
- List of airports in Nebraska

== Other sources ==
- Essential Air Service documents (Docket OST-1999-5173) from the U.S. Department of Transportation:
  - Order 2004-5-15 (May 20, 2004): selecting Great Lakes Aviation, Ltd., to provide essential air service with subsidy support at Grand Island, Kearney, McCook, North Platte, and Scottsbluff, Nebraska, for two years at a total annual subsidy of $5,233,287.
  - Order 2006-6-26 (June 21, 2006): selecting Great Lakes Aviation, Ltd.. to provide essential air service with subsidy support at Kearney, North Platte, and Scottsbluff, Nebraska, for two years, beginning when Mesa Air Group d/b/a Air Midwest inaugurates service at Grand Island and McCook, at a total annual subsidy of $2,393,305 ($897,142 for Kearney; $976,026 for North Platte; and $520,137 for Scottsbluff). Each community will receive three nonstop round trips to Denver each weekday and weekend (18 total round trips per week) with Beech 1900-D aircraft.
  - Order 2008-7-33 (July 29, 2008): selecting Great Lakes Aviation, Ltd. to provide subsidized essential air service (EAS) at Kearney, North Platte, and Scottsbluff, Nebraska, for the two-year period beginning November 1, 2008, at a combined annual subsidy of $5,373,700 with 19-seat Beech 1900D aircraft.
  - Order 2010-9-10 (September 8, 2010): re-selecting Great Lakes Aviation, Ltd., operating as both a United Airlines and Frontier Airlines code share-partner (Great Lakes), to provide essential air service (EAS) at Kearney, North Platte, and Scottsbluff, Nebraska, for a combined annual subsidy of $5,344,690 for the two-year period from November 1, 2010 to October 31, 2012.
