= Chronological list of LPGA major golf champions =

Through the 2026 season, 146 golfers have won one of women's golf's LPGA majors. They are listed here in order of their first win. For a complete list of results in these tournaments see the LPGA majors article.

			First major		Majors won								
#	Player	Country	Year	Tournament	Total	Chevron	PGA	U.S. Open	British	Evian	du Maurier	Titleholders	Western
1	Lucia Mida	United States	1930	Women's Western Open	1								1930
2	June Beebe	United States	1931	Women's Western Open	2								1931, 1933
3	Jane Weiller	United States	1932	Women's Western Open	1								1932
4	Marian McDougall	United States	1934	Women's Western Open	1								1934
5	Opal Hill	United States	1935	Women's Western Open	2								1935, 1936
6	Patty Berg	United States	1937	Titleholders Championship	15			1946				1937, 1938, 1939, 1948, 1953, 1955, 1957	1941, 1943, 1948, 1951, 1955, 1957, 1958
7	Helen Hicks	United States	1937	Women's Western Open	2							1940	1937
8	Bea Barrett	United States	1938	Women's Western Open	1								1938
9	Helen Dettweiler	United States	1939	Women's Western Open	1								1939
10	Babe Zaharias	United States	1940	Women's Western Open	10			1948, 1950, 1954				1947, 1950, 1952	1940, 1944, 1945, 1950
11	Dorothy Kirby	United States	1941	Titleholders Championship	2							1941, 1942	
12	Betty Jameson	United States	1942	Women's Western Open	3			1947					1942, 1954
13	Louise Suggs	United States	1946	Titleholders Championship	11		1957	1949, 1952				1946, 1954, 1956, 1959	1946, 1947, 1949, 1953
14	Peggy Kirk	United States	1949	Titleholders Championship	1							1949	
15	Pat O'Sullivan	United States	1951	Titleholders Championship	1							1951	
16	Betsy Rawls	United States	1951	U.S. Women's Open	8		1959, 1969	1951, 1953, 1957, 1960					1952, 1959
17	Fay Crocker	Uruguay	1955	U.S. Women's Open	2			1955				1960	
18	Beverly Hanson	United States	1955	LPGA Championship	3		1955					1958	1956
19	Marlene Hagge	United States	1956	LPGA Championship	1		1956						
20	Kathy Cornelius	United States	1956	U.S. Women's Open	1			1956					
21	Mickey Wright	United States	1958	LPGA Championship	13		1958, 1960, 1961, 1963	1958, 1959, 1961, 1964				1961, 1962	1962, 1963, 1966
22	Joyce Ziske	United States	1960	Women's Western Open	1								1960
23	Mary Lena Faulk	United States	1961	Women's Western Open	1								1961
24	Murle Lindstrom	United States	1962	U.S. Women's Open	1			1962					
25	Judy Kimball	United States	1962	LPGA Championship	1		1962						
26	Marilynn Smith	United States	1963	Titleholders Championship	2							1963, 1964	
27	Mary Mills	United States	1963	U.S. Women's Open	3		1964, 1973	1963					
28	Carol Mann	United States	1964	Women's Western Open	2			1965					1964
29	Susie Berning	United States	1965	Women's Western Open	4			1968, 1972, 1973					1965
30	Sandra Haynie	United States	1965	LPGA Championship	4		1965, 1974	1974			1982		
31	Kathy Whitworth	United States	1965	Titleholders Championship	6		1967, 1971, 1975					1965, 1966	1967
32	Sandra Spuzich	United States	1966	U.S. Women's Open	1			1966					
33	Gloria Ehret	United States	1966	LPGA Championship	1		1966						
34	Catherine Lacoste	France	1967	U.S. Women's Open	1			1967					
35	Sandra Post	Canada	1968	LPGA Championship	1		1968						
36	Donna Caponi	United States	1969	U.S. Women's Open	4		1979, 1981	1969, 1970					
37	Shirley Englehorn	United States	1970	LPGA Championship	1		1970						
38	JoAnne Carner	United States	1971	U.S. Women's Open	2			1971, 1976					
39	Sandra Palmer	United States	1972	Titleholders Championship	2			1975				1972	
40	Kathy Ahern	United States	1972	LPGA Championship	1		1972						
41	Betty Burfeindt	United States	1976	LPGA Championship	1		1976						
42	Chako Higuchi	Japan	1977	LPGA Championship	1		1977						
43	Hollis Stacy	United States	1977	U.S. Women's Open	4			1977, 1978, 1984			1983		
44	Nancy Lopez	United States	1978	LPGA Championship	3		1978, 1985, 1989						
45	Jerilyn Britz	United States	1979	U.S. Women's Open	1			1979					
46	Amy Alcott	United States	1979	du Maurier Classic	5	1983, 1988, 1991		1980			1979		
47	Sally Little	South Africa	1980	LPGA Championship	2		1980				1988		
48	Pat Bradley	United States	1980	du Maurier Classic	6	1986	1986	1981			1980, 1985, 1986		
49	Jan Stephenson	Australia	1981	du Maurier Classic	3		1982	1983			1981		
50	Janet Anderson	United States	1982	U.S. Women's Open	1			1982					
51	Patty Sheehan	United States	1983	LPGA Championship	6	1996	1983, 1984, 1993	1992, 1994					
52	Juli Inkster	United States	1984	Nabisco Dinah Shore	7	1984, 1989	1999, 2000	1999, 2002			1984		
53	Alice Miller	United States	1985	Nabisco Dinah Shore	1	1985							
54	Kathy Baker	United States	1985	U.S. Women's Open	1			1985					
55	Jane Geddes	United States	1986	U.S. Women's Open	2		1987	1986					
56	Betsy King	United States	1987	Nabisco Dinah Shore	6	1987, 1990, 1997	1992	1989, 1990					
57	Jody Rosenthal	United States	1987	du Maurier Classic	1						1987		
58	Laura Davies	England	1987	U.S. Women's Open	4		1994, 1996	1987			1996		
59	Sherri Turner	United States	1988	LPGA Championship	1		1988						
60	Liselotte Neumann	Sweden	1988	U.S. Women's Open	1			1988					
61	Tammie Green	United States	1989	du Maurier Classic	1						1989		
62	Cathy Johnston	United States	1990	du Maurier Classic	1						1990		
63	Beth Daniel	United States	1990	LPGA Championship	1		1990						
64	Meg Mallon	United States	1991	LPGA Championship	4		1991	1991, 2004			2000		
65	Nancy Scranton	United States	1991	du Maurier Classic	1						1991		
66	Dottie Pepper	United States	1992	Nabisco Dinah Shore	2	1992, 1999							
67	Sherri Steinhauer	United States	1992	du Maurier Classic	2				2006		1992		
68	Helen Alfredsson	Sweden	1993	Nabisco Dinah Shore	1	1993							
69	Lauri Merten	United States	1993	U.S. Women's Open	1			1993					
70	Brandie Burton	United States	1993	du Maurier Classic	2						1993, 1998		
71	Donna Andrews	United States	1994	Nabisco Dinah Shore	1	1994							
72	Martha Nause	United States	1994	du Maurier Classic	1						1994		
73	Nanci Bowen	United States	1995	Nabisco Dinah Shore	1	1995							
74	Kelly Robbins	United States	1995	LPGA Championship	1		1995						
75	Annika Sörenstam	Sweden	1995	U.S. Women's Open	10	2001, 2002, 2005	2003, 2004, 2005	1995, 1996, 2006	2003				
76	Jenny Lidback	Peru; Sweden	1995	du Maurier Classic	1						1995		
77	Christa Johnson	United States	1997	LPGA Championship	1		1997						
78	Alison Nicholas	England	1997	U.S. Women's Open	1			1997					
79	Colleen Walker	United States	1997	du Maurier Classic	1						1997		
80	Pat Hurst	United States	1998	Nabisco Dinah Shore	1	1998							
81	Se Ri Pak	South Korea	1998	LPGA Championship	5		1998, 2002, 2006	1998	2001				
82	Karrie Webb	Australia	1999	du Maurier Classic	7	2000, 2006	2001	2000, 2001	2002		1999		
83	Patricia Meunier-Lebouc	France	2003	Kraft Nabisco Championship	1	2003							
84	Hilary Lunke	United States	2003	U.S. Women's Open	1			2003					
85	Grace Park	South Korea	2004	Kraft Nabisco Championship	1	2004							
86	Karen Stupples	England	2004	Women's British Open	1				2004				
87	Birdie Kim	South Korea	2005	U.S. Women's Open	1			2005					
88	Jang Jeong	South Korea	2005	Women's British Open	1				2005				
89	Morgan Pressel	United States	2007	Kraft Nabisco Championship	1	2007							
90	Suzann Pettersen	Norway	2007	LPGA Championship	2		2007			2013			
91	Cristie Kerr	United States	2007	U.S. Women's Open	2		2010	2007					
92	Lorena Ochoa	Mexico	2007	Women's British Open	2	2008			2007				
93	Yani Tseng	Taiwan	2008	LPGA Championship	5	2010	2008, 2011		2010, 2011				
94	Inbee Park	South Korea	2008	U.S. Women's Open	7	2013	2013, 2014, 2015	2008, 2013	2015				
95	Jiyai Shin	South Korea	2008	Women's British Open	2				2008, 2012				
96	Brittany Lincicome	United States	2009	Kraft Nabisco Championship	2	2009, 2015							
97	Anna Nordqvist	Sweden	2009	LPGA Championship	3		2009		2021	2017			
98	Eun-Hee Ji	South Korea	2009	U.S. Women's Open	1			2009					
99	Catriona Matthew	Scotland	2009	Women's British Open	1				2009				
100	Paula Creamer	United States	2010	U.S. Women's Open	1			2010					
101	Stacy Lewis	United States	2011	Kraft Nabisco Championship	2	2011			2013				
102	So Yeon Ryu	South Korea	2011	U.S. Women's Open	2	2017		2011					
103	Sun-Young Yoo	South Korea	2012	Kraft Nabisco Championship	1	2012							
104	Shanshan Feng	China	2012	LPGA Championship	1		2012						
105	Na Yeon Choi	South Korea	2012	U.S. Women's Open	1			2012					
106	Lexi Thompson	United States	2014	Kraft Nabisco Championship	1	2014							
107	Michelle Wie	United States	2014	U.S. Women's Open	1			2014					
108	Mo Martin	United States	2014	Women's British Open	1				2014				
109	Kim Hyo-joo	South Korea	2014	Evian Championship	1					2014			
110	Chun In-gee	South Korea	2015	U.S. Women's Open	3		2022	2015		2016			
111	Lydia Ko	New Zealand	2015	Evian Championship	3	2016			2024	2015			
112	Brooke Henderson	Canada	2016	Women's PGA Championship	2		2016			2022			
113	Brittany Lang	United States	2016	U.S. Women's Open	1			2016					
114	Ariya Jutanugarn	Thailand	2016	Women's British Open	2			2018	2016				
115	Danielle Kang	United States	2017	Women's PGA Championship	1		2017						
116	Park Sung-hyun	South Korea	2017	U.S. Women's Open	2		2018	2017					
117	In-Kyung Kim	South Korea	2017	Women's British Open	1				2017				
118	Pernilla Lindberg	Sweden	2018	ANA Inspiration	1	2018							
119	Georgia Hall	England	2018	Women's British Open	1				2018				
120	Angela Stanford	United States	2018	Evian Championship	1					2018			
121	Ko Jin-young	South Korea	2019	ANA Inspiration	2	2019				2019			
122	Lee Jeong-eun	South Korea	2019	U.S. Women's Open	1			2019					
123	Hannah Green	Australia	2019	Women's PGA Championship	1		2019						
124	Hinako Shibuno	Japan	2019	Women's British Open	1				2019				
125	Sophia Popov	Germany	2020	Women's British Open	1				2020				
126	Mirim Lee	South Korea	2020	ANA Inspiration	1	2020							
127	Kim Sei-young	South Korea	2020	Women's PGA Championship	1		2020						
128	Kim A-lim	South Korea	2020	U.S. Women's Open	1			2020					
129	Patty Tavatanakit	Thailand	2021	ANA Inspiration	1	2021							
130	Yuka Saso	Philippines Japan	2021	U.S. Women's Open	2			2021, 2024					
131	Nelly Korda	United States	2021	Women's PGA Championship	4	2024, 2026	2021	2026					
132	Minjee Lee	Australia	2021	Evian Championship	3		2025	2022		2021			
133	Jennifer Kupcho	United States	2022	Chevron Championship	1	2022							
134	Ashleigh Buhai	South Africa	2022	Women's British Open	1				2022				
135	Lilia Vu	United States	2023	Chevron Championship	2	2023			2023				
136	Yin Ruoning	China	2023	Women's PGA Championship	1		2023						
137	Allisen Corpuz	United States	2023	U.S. Women's Open	1			2023					
138	Céline Boutier	France	2023	Evian Championship	1					2023			
139	Amy Yang	South Korea	2024	Women's PGA Championship	1		2024						
140	Ayaka Furue	Japan	2024	Evian Championship	1					2024			
141	Mao Saigo	Japan	2025	Chevron Championship	1	2025							
142	Maja Stark	Sweden	2025	U.S. Women's Open	1			2025					
143	Grace Kim	Australia	2025	Evian Championship	1					2025			
144	Miyū Yamashita	Japan	2025	Women's British Open	1				2025				
145	Ryu Hae-ran	South Korea	2026	Women's PGA Championship	2		2026			2026			
146	Shiho Kuwaki	Japan	2026	Women's British Open	1				2026				

== See also ==
- List of LPGA major championship winning golfers
- Chronological list of men's major golf champions
