= 1948 in sports =

1948 in sports describes the year's events in world sport.

== American football ==
- NFL Championship: the Philadelphia Eagles won 7–0 over the Chicago Cardinals at Shibe Park in a blizzard
- Michigan Wolverines – college football national championship
- Cleveland Browns defeated the Buffalo Bills 49–7 in the All-America Football Conference championship game.

== Association football ==
Egypt

- Egyptian Premier League founded.

England

- First Division – Arsenal win the 1947–48 title.
- FA Cup – Manchester United beat Blackpool 4–2.

== Athletics ==
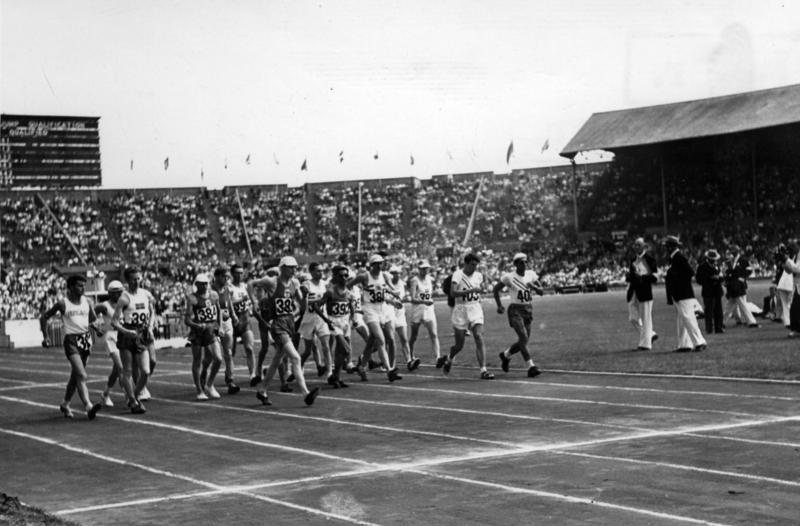
Start of the 50 km walk at the London Olympics

33 athletics events were contested at the Olympic Games in London, including debuts for the men's 10 km walk; and the women's 200 metres, long jump and shot put. Fanny Blankers-Koen of the Netherlands captured four gold medals.

== Australian rules football ==
Victorian Football League

- Melbourne wins the 52nd VFL Premiership, drawing the 1948 VFL Grand Final with Essendon 10.9 (69) to 7.27 (69), and winning the replay 13.11 (89) to Essendon's 7.8 (50)
- Brownlow Medal awarded to Bill Morris (Richmond)

South Australian National Football League

- 2 October – Norwood wins its twenty-first SANFL premiership, defeating West Torrens 15.16 (106) to 7.7 (49)
- Magarey Medal awarded to Ron Phillips (North Adelaide)

Western Australian National Football League

- 9 October – South Fremantle wins its fourth premiership and second in succession, defeating West Perth 13.9 (87) to 9.9 (63)
- Sandover Medal awarded to Merv McIntosh (Perth)

== Baseball ==
- January 29 – Commissioner Happy Chandler fines the Yankees, Cubs, and Phillies $500 each for signing high school players.
- February 27 – Hall of Fame election – voters select the recently deceased Herb Pennock, and Pie Traynor, as the newest inductees; Traynor is the first third baseman elected by the writers in 9 elections.
- August 16 – death of Babe Ruth
- World Series – Cleveland Indians defeat Boston Braves, 4 games to 2.
- Negro World Series – Homestead Grays defeat the Birmingham Black Barons, 4 games to 1.
- College World Series - University of Southern California defeat Yale in the 2nd 2 games to 1

== Basketball ==
NCAA Basketball Championship

- Kentucky beat Baylor 58–42

BAA (NBA) Finals

- Baltimore Bullets over the Philadelphia Warriors (4–2)

NBL Championship

- Minneapolis Lakers over Rochester Royals (3–1)

== Boxing ==
- June 25 – At New York's Yankee Stadium – Joe Louis knocked out Jersey Joe Walcott in the 11th round to retain his heavyweight title for the 25th time. Shortly after the bout, Louis announced his retirement from boxing.

== Field hockey ==
- Olympic Games (men's competition) in London, Great Britain
  - Gold: India
  - Silver: Great Britain
  - Bronze: Netherlands

== Figure skating ==
- World Figure Skating Championships
  - Men's champion: Dick Button, United States
  - Ladies' champion: Barbara Ann Scott, Canada
  - Pair skating champions: Micheline Lannoy & Pierre Baugniet, Belgium

== Golf ==
Men's professional

- Masters Tournament – Claude Harmon
- PGA Championship – Ben Hogan
- U.S. Open – Ben Hogan
- British Open – Henry Cotton

Men's amateur

- British Amateur – Frank Stranahan
- U.S. Amateur – Willie Turnesa

Women's professional

- Women's Western Open – Patty Berg
- U.S. Women's Open – Babe Zaharias
- Titleholders Championship – Patty Berg

== Ice hockey ==
- NCAA Men's Ice Hockey Championship – Michigan Wolverines defeat Dartmouth College Big Green 8–4 in Colorado Springs, Colorado to win the first official NCAA championship
- Stanley Cup – Toronto Maple Leafs beat Detroit Red Wings in 4 straight games to win their 5th Stanley Cup title.

== Horse racing ==
- Citation becomes the 8th horse to win the US Triple Crown
- Shiela's Cottage becomes the first mare to win the Grand National since 1902 and only the twelfth since the race's inception

Steeplechases

- Cheltenham Gold Cup – Cottage Rake
- Grand National – Sheila's Cottage

Hurdle races

- Champion Hurdle – National Spirit

Flat races

- Australia – Melbourne Cup won by Rimfire (horse)
- Canada – King's Plate won by Last Mark
- France – Prix de l'Arc de Triomphe won by Migoli
- Ireland – Irish Derby Stakes won by Nathoo
- English Triple Crown Races:
  1. 2,000 Guineas Stakes – My Babu
  2. The Derby – My Love
  3. St. Leger Stakes – Black Tarquin
- United States Triple Crown Races:
  1. Kentucky Derby – Citation
  2. Preakness Stakes – Citation
  3. Belmont Stakes – Citation

== Olympic Games ==
- 1948 Summer Olympics takes place in London, United Kingdom
  - United States wins the most medals (84) and the most gold medals (38).
- 1948 Winter Olympics takes place in St. Moritz, Switzerland
  - Norway, Sweden and Switzerland all win the most medals (10 each), and Norway and Sweden win the most gold medals (4 each).

== Radiosport ==
- First CQ World Wide DX Contest held in October and November. This annual event would go on to become the radio contest with the largest participation worldwide.

== Rowing ==
The Boat Race

- 27 March — Cambridge wins the 94th Oxford and Cambridge Boat Race

== Rugby league ==
- 1948–49 Kangaroo tour of Great Britain and France

Australia

- 1948 NSWRFL season

England

- 1947–48 Northern Rugby Football League season/1948–49 Northern Rugby Football League season

== Rugby union ==
Five Nations Championship

- 54th Five Nations Championship series is won by Ireland who complete the Grand Slam, their last for 61 years.

== Snooker ==
- World Snooker Championship – Fred Davis beats Walter Donaldson 84–61.

== Speed skating ==
Speed Skating World Championships

- Men's All-round Champion – Odd Lundberg (Norway)
- Women's All-round Champion – Maria Isakova (USSR)

1948 Winter Olympics (Men)

- 500m – gold medal: Finn Helgesen (Norway)
- 1500m – gold medal: Sverre Farstad (Norway)
- 5000m – gold medal: Reidar Liaklev (Norway)
- 10000m – gold medal: Åke Seyffarth (Sweden)

1948 Winter Olympics (Women)

- not contested

== Tennis ==
Australia

- Australian Men's Singles Championship – Adrian Quist (Australia) defeats John Bromwich (Australia) 6–4, 3–6, 6–3, 2–6, 6–3
- Australian Women's Singles Championship – Nancye Wynne Bolton (Australia) defeats Marie Toomey (Australia) 6–3, 6–1

England

- Wimbledon Men's Singles Championship – Bob Falkenburg (USA) defeats John Bromwich (Australia) 7–5, 0–6, 6–2, 3–6, 7–5
- Wimbledon Women's Singles Championship – Louise Brough Clapp (USA) defeats Doris Hart (USA) 6–3, 8–6

France

- French Men's Singles Championship – Frank Parker (USA) defeats Jaroslav Drobný (Egypt) 6–1, 6–2, 3–6, 5–7, 7–5
- French Women's Singles Championship – Nelly Adamson Landry (USA) defeats Shirley Fry (USA) 6–2, 0–6, 6–0

USA

- American Men's Singles Championship – Pancho Gonzales (USA) defeats Eric Sturgess (South Africa) 6–2, 6–3, 14–12
- American Women's Singles Championship – Margaret Osborne (USA) defeats Louise Brough (USA) 4–6, 6–4, 15–13

Davis Cup

- 1948 Davis Cup – United States 5–0 Australia at West Side Tennis Club (grass) New York City, United States

== Awards ==
- Associated Press Male Athlete of the Year – Lou Boudreau, Major League Baseball
- Associated Press Female Athlete of the Year – Fanny Blankers-Koen, Track and field
