= 1957 in sports =

1957 in sports describes the year's events in world sport.

== American football ==
- NFL Championship: the Detroit Lions won 59–14 over the Cleveland Browns at Briggs Stadium
- 1957 college football season:
  - The Auburn Tigers are voted national champions by the AP Poll; do not play in a bowl game on January 1, 1958, due to sanctions

== Association football ==
- European Cup – Real Madrid beat Fiorentina 2–0.

=== England ===
- First Division – Manchester United win the 1956–57 title.
- FA Cup – Aston Villa beat Manchester United 2–1.
- May 15 – Stanley Matthews makes his last England appearance.

=== Other events ===
- February 8 – The Confederation of African Football is founded in Khartoum.

== Australian rules football ==
- June 1 – East Perth kick a score of 3.30 (48) in wet conditions against Swan Districts’ 5.11 (41). It is the most inaccurate score in senior Australian Rules football history with 27 more behinds than goals.
- August 17 – By beating Essendon by 21 points, Hawthorn secure their first finals position in senior VFL football, which they joined in 1925. It is the longest finals absence in major Australian sporting history.
- August 31 – Hawthorn beat Carlton 10.11 (71) to 6.12 (48) in their first senior VFL final. It is the first time Hawthorn had finished above the Blues in their 33 years in the League.
- September 7 – West Perth 12.10 (82) draw with South Fremantle 13.4 (82) for the first senior WANFL drawn match since June 29, 1946, when the Cardinals drew with Swan Districts. The 948-game gap between constitutes the longest non-occurrence of draws in a major Australian Rules competition.
- September 21 – Melbourne 17.14 (116) beat Essendon 7.13 (55) in the VFL Grand Final. It is their third successive premiership, a feat not equalled until the Brisbane Lions in 2003.
- September 28 – Port Adelaide win their fourth successive SANFL premiership, beating Norwood 15.15 (105) to 13.16 (94).
- October 12 – East Fremantle beat East Perth 10.18 (78) to 9.8 (62) in the WANFL Grand Final for their eighteenth senior WANFL premiership, though their first since the unbeaten season of 1946.

== Bandy ==
- 1957 Bandy World Championship is held in Finland and won by Soviet Union.

== Baseball ==
- January 5 – Jackie Robinson retires rather than move across town from the Dodgers to the Giants, to whom he had been traded in December.
- Roy Sievers lead American league with 42 home runs and 114 RBIs, for the last place Washington Senators.
- Cy Young Award – Warren Spahn, Milwaukee Braves
- World Series – Milwaukee Braves defeat the New York Yankees four games to three.
- May 3 – Walter O'Malley, the owner of the Brooklyn Dodgers, agrees to move the team from Brooklyn, New York, to Los Angeles, California.
- August 19- Horace Stoneham announces that the Giants are moving from New York to San Francisco, California.
- October 8 – Walter O'Malley announces that the Dodgers are going to move from Brooklyn, New York, to Los Angeles, California.
- The Winnipeg Goldeyes win the Northern League championship.

== Basketball ==
- NCAA Men's Division I Basketball Championship:
  - North Carolina wins 54–53 over Kansas
- NBA Finals:
  - Boston Celtics won 4 games to 3 over the St. Louis Hawks
- The tenth European basketball championship, Eurobasket 1957, is won by the Soviet Union.
- Spanish professional basketball league, Liga Espanola de Baloncesto (Spain Basketball League), a first game held on March 31.(as predecessor for Liga ACB)

== Boxing ==
- September 23 – Carmen Basilio won the World Middleweight Championship by a 15-round decision over Sugar Ray Robinson.

== Bowling ==
Nine-pin bowling

- Nine-pin bowling World Championships –
  - Men's champion: Ion Micoroiu, Romania
  - Women's champion: Gertrude Schmidka, Austria
  - Men's team champion: Yugoslavia
  - Women's team champion: Austria

== Canadian football ==
- Grey Cup – Hamilton Tiger-Cats won 32–7 over the Winnipeg Blue Bombers

== Cycling ==
- Giro d'Italia won by Gastone Nencini of Italy
- Tour de France – Jacques Anquetil of France
- UCI Road World Championships – Men's road race – Rik Van Steenbergen of Belgium

== Figure skating ==
- World Figure Skating Championships:
  - Men's champion: David Jenkins, United States
  - Ladies' champion: Carol Heiss, United States
  - Pair skating champions: Barbara Wagner & Robert Paul, Canada
  - Ice dancing champions: June Markham & Courtney Jones, Great Britain

== Golf ==
Men's professional

- Masters Tournament – Doug Ford
- U.S. Open – Dick Mayer
- British Open – Bobby Locke
- PGA Championship – Lionel Hebert
- PGA Tour money leader – Dick Mayer – $65,835
- Ryder Cup – Britain wins 7½ to 4½ over the United States in team golf.

Men's amateur

- British Amateur – Reid Jack
- U.S. Amateur – Hillman Robbins

Women's professional

- Women's Western Open – Patty Berg
- LPGA Championship – Louise Suggs
- U.S. Women's Open – Betsy Rawls
- Titleholders Championship – Patty Berg
- LPGA Tour money leader – Patty Berg – $16,272

== Harness racing ==
- United States Pacing Triple Crown races:
  1. Cane Pace – Torpid
  2. Little Brown Jug – Torpid
  3. Messenger Stakes – Meadow Lands
- United States Trotting Triple Crown races:
  1. Hambletonian – Hickory Smoke
  2. Yonkers Trot – Hoot Song
  3. Kentucky Futurity – Cassin Hanover
- Australian Inter Dominion Harness Racing Championship:
  - Pacers: Radiant Venture

== Horse racing ==
Steeplechases

- Cheltenham Gold Cup – Linwell
- Grand National – Sundew

Flat races

- Australia – Melbourne Cup won by Straight Draw
- Canada – Queen's Plate won by Lyford Cay
- France – Prix de l'Arc de Triomphe won by Oroso
- Ireland – Irish Derby Stakes won by Ballymoss
- English Triple Crown Races:
  1. 2,000 Guineas Stakes – Crepello
  2. The Derby – Crepello
  3. St. Leger Stakes – Ballymoss
- United States Triple Crown Races:
  1. May 4 – Kentucky Derby – Iron Liege
  2. Preakness Stakes – Bold Ruler
  3. Belmont Stakes – Gallant Man

== Ice hockey ==
- Art Ross Trophy as the NHL's leading scorer during the regular season: Gordie Howe, Detroit Red Wings
- Hart Memorial Trophy for the NHL's Most Valuable Player: Gordie Howe, Detroit Red Wings
- Stanley Cup – Montreal Canadiens win 4 games to 1 over the Boston Bruins
- World Hockey Championship
  - Men's champion: Sweden defeated the Soviet Union
- NCAA Men's Ice Hockey Championship – Colorado College Tigers defeat University of Michigan Wolverines 13–6 in Colorado Springs, Colorado

== Rugby league ==
- 1956–57 Kangaroo tour of Great Britain and France
- 1957 New Zealand rugby league season
- 1957 NSWRFL season
- 1956–57 Northern Rugby Football League season / 1957–58 Northern Rugby Football League season
- 1957 Rugby League World Cup

== Rugby union ==
- 63rd Five Nations Championship series is won by England who complete the Grand Slam

== Snooker ==
- World Snooker Championship – John Pulman beats Jackie Rea 39-34

== Swimming ==
- January 31 – death in a road accident of John Marshall (26), Australian Olympic freestyle swimmer

== Tennis ==
Australia

- Australian Men's Singles Championship – Ashley Cooper (Australia) defeats Neale Fraser (Australia) 6–3, 9–11, 6–4, 6–2
- Australian Women's Singles Championship – Shirley Fry Irvin (USA) defeats Althea Gibson (USA) 6–3, 6–4

England

- Wimbledon Men's Singles Championship – Lew Hoad (Australia) defeats Ashley Cooper (Australia) 6–2, 6–1, 6–2
- Wimbledon Women's Singles Championship – Althea Gibson (USA) defeats Darlene Hard (USA) 6–3, 6–2

France

- French Men's Singles Championship – Sven Davidson (Sweden) defeats Herbert Flam (USA) 6–3, 6–4, 6–4
- French Women's Singles Championship – Shirley Bloomer (Great Britain) defeats Dorothy Head Knode 6–1, 6–3

USA

- American Men's Singles Championship – Malcolm Anderson (Australia) defeats Ashley Cooper (Australia) 10–8, 7–5, 6–4
- American Women's Singles Championship – Althea Gibson (USA) defeats Louise Brough (USA) 6–3, 6–2

Events

- Althea Gibson becomes the first black player to win a Wimbledon singles championship

Davis Cup

- 1957 Davis Cup – Australia 3–2 United States at Kooyong Stadium (grass) Melbourne, Australia

== Multi-sport events ==
- Pan Arab Games held in Beirut, Lebanon

== Awards ==
- Associated Press Male Athlete of the Year – Ted Williams, Major League Baseball
- Associated Press Female Athlete of the Year – Althea Gibson, Tennis
