= 1947 Titleholders Championship =

Golf tournament in Augusta, Georgia, US

The 1947 Titleholders Championship was contested from March 27–30 at Augusta Country Club. It was the 8th edition of the Titleholders Championship.

This event was won by Babe Zaharias.

== Round summaries ==
=== First round ===
Place	Player	Score	To par
T1	(United States) Patty Berg	73	−2
T1	(United States) Dorothy Kirby (a)	73	−2
T1	(United States) Louise Suggs (a)	73	−2
4	(United States) Mary Agnes Wall (a)	77	+2
T5	(England) Maureen Ruttle (a)	78	+3
T5	(United States) Babe Zaharias (a)	78	+3

=== Second round ===
Place	Player	Score	To par
1	(United States) Dorothy Kirby (a)	73-76=149	−1
2	(United States) Patty Berg	73-79=152	+2
3	(United States) Louise Suggs (a)	73-83=155	+5
4	(United States) Babe Zaharias (a)	78-81=159	+9
5	(United States) Helen Sigel (a)	85-76=161	+11

=== Third round ===
Place	Player	Score	To par
1	(United States) Dorothy Kirby (a)	73-76-79=228	+3
2	(United States) Babe Zaharias (a)	78-81-71=230	+5
T3	(United States) Patty Berg	73-79-79=231	+6
T3	(United States) Louise Suggs (a)	73-83-75=231	+6
5	(United States) Helen Sigel (a)	85-76-77=238	+13

=== Final round ===
Place	Player	Score	To par	Money ($)
1	(United States) Babe Zaharias (a)	78-81-71-74=304	+4	0
2	(United States) Dorothy Kirby (a)	73-76-79-81=309	+9	0
3	(United States) Louise Suggs (a)	73-83-75-79=310	+10	0
4	(United States) Patty Berg	73-79-79-80=311	+11	300
5	(United States) Helen Sigel (a)	85-76-77-82=320	+20	0
6	(United States) Betty Jameson	81-82-72-81=328	+28	200
7	(United States) Sally Sessions (a)	82-82-82-84=330	+30	0
8	(United States) Peggy Kirk (a)	84-83-72-85=331	+31	0
9	(United States) Laddie Irwin (a)	83-4-84-85=336	+36	0
10	(United States) Mary Agnes Wall (a)	77-85-88-88=338	+38	0
