= 1948 Titleholders Championship =

Golf tournament in Augusta, Georgia, US

The 1948 Titleholders Championship was contested from March 18–21 at Augusta Country Club. It was the 9th edition of the Titleholders Championship.

Patty Berg won her fourth Titleholders.

== Final leaderboard ==
| Place | Player | Score | To par |
|---|---|---|---|
| 1 | (United States) Patty Berg | 80-74-78-76=308 | +8 |
| T2 | (United States) Peggy Kirk | 77-79-79-74=309 | +9 |
| T2 | (United States) Babe Zaharias | 77-80-73-79=309 | +9 |
| 4 | (United States) Estelle Page | 79-76-78-79=312 | +12 |
| 5 | (United States) Dorothy Kirby | 74-77-81-81=313 | +13 |
| 6 | (United States) Mary Agnes Wall | 78-78-81-80=317 | +17 |
| 7 | (United States) Marjorie Lindsay | 80-77-82-79=318 | +18 |
| 8 | (United States) Grace Lenczyk | 77-80-79-84=320 | +20 |
| 9 | (United States) Eileen Stulb | 85-79-83-79=326 | +26 |
| 10 | (United States) Helen Sigel | 84-82-81-81=328 | +28 |
