= Pat and Mike =

1952 film by George Cukor

- Theatrical-release poster
- Directed by: George Cukor
- Screenplay by: Ruth Gordon; Garson Kanin
- Produced by: Lawrence Weingarten
- Starring: Spencer Tracy; Katharine Hepburn; Aldo Ray; William Ching
- Cinematography: William H. Daniels (as William Daniels)
- Edited by: George Boemler
- Music by: David Raksin
- Production company: Metro-Goldwyn-Mayer
- Distributed by: Loew's Inc.
- Release date: June 14, 1952
- Running time: 95 minutes
- Country: United States
- Language: English
- Budget: $1,618,000
- Box office: $2,696,000

Pat and Mike is a 1952 American romantic comedy film starring Spencer Tracy and Katharine Hepburn. The movie was written by Ruth Gordon and Garson Kanin, and directed by George Cukor. Cukor directed The Philadelphia Story (1940) with Hepburn, and Cukor, Gordon and Kanin teamed with Hepburn and Tracy again for Adam's Rib (1949). Gordon and Kanin were nominated for the 1952 Academy Award for Best Original Screenplay for their work on Pat and Mike. (They had been similarly honored for Adam's Rib.)

Hepburn was nominated in the Best Actress category at the 10th Golden Globe Awards, while Aldo Ray was nominated for "New Star of the Year".

== Plot ==
Pat Pemberton is a brilliant athlete who loses her confidence whenever her charming but overbearing fiancé, Collier, is around. Women's golf and tennis championships are within her reach; however, she gets flustered by his presence at the contests. He wants her to give up her goal and marry him, but Pat does not give up on herself that easily. She enlists the help of Mike Conovan, a slightly shady sports promoter. Together they face mobsters, a jealous boxer, and a growing mutual attraction.

== Cast ==
- Spencer Tracy as Mike Conovan
- Katharine Hepburn as Pat Pemberton
- Aldo Ray as Davie Hucko
- William Ching as Collier Weld
- Sammy White as Barney Grau
- George Mathews as Spec Cauley
- Loring Smith as Mr. Beminger
- Phyllis Povah as Mrs. Beminger
- Charles Buchinski as Hank Tasling
- Frank Richards as Sam Garsell
- Jim Backus as Charles Barry
- Chuck Connors as Police Captain
- Joseph E. Bernard as Gibby
- Owen McGiveney as Harry MacWade
- Lou Lubin as Waiter
- Carl "Alfalfa" Switzer as Bus Boy
- William Self as Pat Pemberton's Caddy

Sports Stars

- Gussie Moran as Herself
- Babe Didrikson Zaharias as Herself
- Don Budge as Himself
- Alice Marble as Herself
- Frank Parker as Himself
- Betty Hicks as Herself
- Beverly Hanson as Herself
- Helen Dettweiler as Herself

== Production ==
=== Development ===
Garson Kanin and Ruth Gordon were friends with Hepburn and Tracy, and had the idea of writing a film to showcase Hepburn's athletic abilities. She was an avid golfer and tennis player, and indeed performed all the sports footage in the film herself.

=== Filming ===
Pat and Mike was filmed partly on location in California. The golfing scenes were filmed at the Riviera Country Club and Ojai Valley Inn. Tennis scenes were filmed at the Cow Palace in Daly City, near San Francisco. The opening scenes were filmed at Occidental College, standing in as fictional Pacific Technical College.

=== Casting ===
Many notable athletes appear in cameo roles as themselves in the film, including golfers Babe Didrikson Zaharias, Betty Hicks, and Helen Dettweiler, and tennis champions Don Budge, Gussie Moran and Alice Marble. Other notables in the cast include Charles Bronson (credited as Charles Buchinski) in his second credited movie role, Carl "Alfalfa" Switzer, Jim Backus, and, in his acting debut, former athlete Chuck Connors, later known as the star of The Rifleman television series.

== Music ==
The score for the film was composed and conducted by David Raksin, with orchestrations by Robert Franklyn and Ruby Raksin. Of his music, Raksin said "My music was sly and a mite jazzy, and despite the fact that everyone seemed to like it, so did I."

The complete score was issued on CD in 2009, on Film Score Monthly records.

== Reception ==
=== Box office ===
According to MGM records the film earned $2,050,000 in the US and Canada and $646,000 elsewhere, resulting in a profit of $74,000.

=== Critical reaction ===
Bosley Crowther of The New York Times praised the film as "a pleasing blue-plate of al fresco warm-weather fare... a shaky combination of, let us say, Woman of the Year and (if you can imagine without music) the theatrical Guys and Dolls. But, withal, it is a likable fable about a highly coordinated dame who moves in upon and takes over a positive, authoritative guy, with slight overtones of honor triumphing over shadiness and greed. And it is smoothly directed by George Cukor and slyly, amusingly played by the whole cast, especially by its duo of easy, adroit, experienced stars." William Brogdon of Variety wrote: "The smooth-working team of Spencer Tracy and Katharine Hepburn spark the fun ... Hepburn is quite believable as a femme athlete taken under the wing of promoter Tracy. Film settles down to a series of laugh sequences of training, exhibitions and cross-country tours in which Hepburn proves to be a star. Tracy is given some choice lines in the script and makes much of them in an easy, throwaway style that lifts the comedy punch."

Among latter reviews, Felicia Feaster, in a review posted on Turner Classic Movies, notes: "As with Adam's Rib, Pat and Mike is an honest, amusing account of the battle between the sexes, but also a celebration of male-female chemistry made all the more exciting when the romantic leads are also equals, a specialty of the Kanin–Gordon writing style." On Rotten Tomatoes, the film has an aggregate score of 85% based on 26 sampled reviews, with an average rating of 7.4/10. The website's consensus reads: "Katharine Hepburn and Spencer Tracy take competition to a romantic-comic highpoint in this elegantly directed sports comedy by George Cukor."

== See also ==
- List of American films of 1952
