= 1943 Women's Western Open =

Golf tournament

Tournament information
- Dates: June 28 – July 2, 1943
- Location: Glen Ellyn, Illinois; 41.8778°N 88.0431°W
- Course: Glen Oak Country Club
- Format: Stroke play/match play

Statistics
- Par: 76
- Field: 107 players, 32 to match play
- Cut: 90 (+14)

Champion
- Patty Berg
- def. Dorothy Kirby, 1 up
- Location within the United States Location within Illinois

The 1943 Women's Western Open was a golf competition held at Glen Oak Country Club in Glen Ellyn, Illinois, from June 28 to July 2. It was the 14th edition of the Women's Western Open.

The field of 107 golfers played an 18-hole qualifying round to determine the 32 players advancing to match play. Patty Berg earned medalist honors with a qualifying round of 76 (E). Match play was over 18 holes for each round except the 36-hole final. After the first round of match play, two professionals and fourteen amateur golfers remained in the field.

Berg won the championship in match play competition by defeating Dorothy Kirby in the final match, 1 up. It was Berg's first tournament following a knee injury suffered in an automobile accident in December 1941.

== Final 16 bracket ==
Round of 16; June 30, morning
Patty Berg	5&4
Mary Agnes Wall (a)
Marjorie Row (a)	19h
Margaret Gunther (a)
Catherine Fox (a)	7&6
Margaret Russell (a)
Eleanor Romadka (a)	19h
Virginia Ingram (a)
Kay Byrne (a)	6&5
Ruth H. More (a)
Dorothy Germain (a)	4&3
Phyllis Otto (a)
Betty Hicks	5&4
Dorothy Ellis (a)
Dorothy Kirby (a)	7&6
Betty Jane Haemerle (a)

Quarterfinals; June 30, afternoon
Patty Berg	19h
Marjorie Row (a)
Catherine Fox (a)	3&1
Eleanor Romadka (a)
Dorothy Germain (a)	3&2
Kay Byrne (a)
Betty Hicks
Dorothy Kirby (a)	19h

Semifinals; July 1
Patty Berg	7&6
Catherine Fox (a)
Dorothy Germain (a)	3&1
Dorothy Kirby (a)

Finals; July 2
Patty Berg	1up
Dorothy Kirby (a)
