= 1946 U.S. Women's Open =

Coordinates: 47.767°N 117.440°W

Tournament information
- Dates: August 26 – September 1
- Location: Spokane, Washington
- Course: Spokane Country Club
- Organized by: WPGA and Spokane; Athletic Round Table
- Format: Match play

Statistics
- Par: 74
- Length: 6,387 yards (5,840 m)
- Field: 39 players, 32 to match play
- Cut: 188 (+40)
- Prize fund: $19,700
- Winner's share: $5,600

Champion
- (United States) Patty Berg
- def. Betty Jameson, 5 and 4

Location in the United States
Location in Washington

The 1946 U.S. Women's Open was a golf tournament contested from August 26 to September 1 at Spokane Country Club, north of Spokane, Washington. It was the first edition of the U.S. Women's Open, and only one to have been played in match play competition. The field of 39 women was reduced to the 32-player match play field by a 36-hole qualifier on Monday and Tuesday. Six professionals and 26 amateurs advanced to match play. The format was 18-hole matches through the quarterfinals, and 36 holes for the semifinals and finals.

Professionals Patty Berg and Betty Jameson reached the Sunday final. Jameson led by three after seven holes, but Berg evened the match and they finished the first 18 holes all square. After lunch, Berg needed only fourteen holes in the afternoon to close out the match at 5 & 4. Berg won $5,600 and Jameson $3,100, all in war bonds. This win was later recognized as Berg's sixth major championship. The winner's share at the U.S. Women's Open was substantially less in succeeding years and was not exceeded until 1972, 26 years later.

Jameson won the title the following year as a 72-hole stroke play event.

Founded in 1898, Spokane Country Club was purchased by the Kalispel Tribe in late 2015 and is now Kalispell Golf and Country Club.

== Qualifying scores and final results ==
Player	Qualifying score	Seed	Finish
Patty Berg	145	1	1
Betty Jameson	158	6	2
Betty Jean Rucker (a)	153	3	T3
Dot Kielty (a)	162	12	T3
Jackie Pung (a)	157	5	T5
Betty Hicks	159	7	T5
Clara Sherman (a)	160	8	T5
Ellen Kieser (a)	180	26	T5
Beverly Hanson (a)	155	4	T9
Mary Mozel	160	9	T9
Helen Dettweiler	161	11	T9
Edean Anderson (a)	164	13	T9
Ann Casey (a)	165	14	T9
Yola Apostoli (a)	166	15	T9
Mrs. Walter Nagel (a)	166	16	T9
Grace Lenczyk (a)	167	18	T9
Babe Didrikson Zaharias (a)	152	2	T17
Hope Seignious	161	10	T17
Margaret Spear (a)	166	17	T17
Mrs. Frank Kapps (a)	174	19	T17
Mrs. J.R. West (a)	174	20	T17
Mrs. Jo Pedicord (a)	175	21	T17
Barbara Smith (a)	176	22	T17
Mary Sargent (a)	178	23	T17
Carol Gleason (a)	179	24	T17
Jewel Ann Gronley (a)	180	25	T17
Betty Frank (a)	181	27	T17
Pedee Hosler (a)	184	28	T17
Mrs. William May (a)	185	29	T17
Grace DeMoss (a)	186	30	T17
Mrs. Walter McCarty (a)	187	31	T17
Bennye Sellers (a)	188	32	T17

- (a) denotes amateur

== Bracket ==
Round 1 August 28
1	Patty Berg	7&6
17	Margaret Spear
9	Mary Mozel	6&5
25	Jewel Ann Gronley
5	Jackie Pung	5&4
21	Mrs. Jo Pedicord
13	Edean Anderson	2 up
29	Mrs. William May
3	Betty Jean Rucker	6&5
19	Mrs. Frank Kapps
11	Helen Dettweiler	6&4
27	Betty Frank
7	Betty Hicks	1 up
23	Mary Sargent
15	Yola Apostoli	3&1
31	Mrs. Walter McCarty
2	Babe Didrikson Zaharias
18	Grace Lenczyk	3&2
10	Hope Seignious
26	Ellen Kieser	3&2
6	Betty Jameson	9&8
22	Barbara Smith
14	Ann Casey	3&2
30	Grace DeMoss
4	Beverly Hanson	6&4
20	Mrs. J.R. West
12	Dot Kielty	5&4
28	Pedee Hosler
8	Clara Sherman	7&5
24	Carol Gleason
16	Mrs. Walter Nagel	8&7
32	Bennye Sellers

Round 2 August 29
1	Patty Berg	5&3
9	Mary Mozel
5	Jackie Pung	4&2
13	Edean Anderson
3	Betty Jean Rucker	2&1
11	Helen Dettweiler
7	Betty Hicks	4&2
15	Yola Apostoli
18	Grace Lenczyk
26	Ellen Kieser	5&4
6	Betty Jameson	5&4
14	Ann Casey
4	Beverly Hanson
12	Dot Kielty	5&4
8	Clara Sherman	5&4
16	Mrs. Walter Nagel

Quarter-finals; August 30
1	Patty Berg	6&5
5	Jackie Pung
3	Betty Jean Rucker	5&4
7	Betty Hicks
26	Ellen Kieser
6	Betty Jameson	8&6
12	Dot Kielty	2&1
8	Clara Sherman

Semi-finals; August 31
1	Patty Berg	3&2
3	Betty Jean Rucker
6	Betty Jameson	1 up
12	Dot Kielty

Final; September 1
1	Patty Berg	5&4
6	Betty Jameson

== Final match scorecards ==
Morning

Hole	1	2	3	4	5	6	7	8	9	10	11	12	13	14	15	16	17	18
Par	4	4	5	5	4	4	3	5	3	3	5	4	5	4	4	5	3	4
(United States) Berg	4	4	5	5	4	5	4	5	3	4	4	4	5	4	5	4	3	4
(United States) Jameson	4	4	4	5	4	4	3	6	4	3	5	3	6	4	5	5	3	4
Leader	–	–	J1	J1	J1	J2	J3	J2	J1	J2	J1	J2	J1	J1	J1	–	–	–

Afternoon

Hole	1	2	3	4	5	6	7	8	9	10	11	12	13	14	15	16	17	18
Par	4	4	5	5	4	4	3	5	3	3	5	4	5	4	4	5	3	4
(United States) Berg	3	4	5	4	5	4	3	6	3	3	5	4	5	4	Berg wins 5 & 4			
(United States) Jameson	4	5	4	5	6	6	3	6	3	4	5	3	5	5	Berg wins 5 & 4			
Leader	B1	B2	B1	B2	B3	B4	B4	B4	B4	B5	B5	B4	B4	B5	Berg wins 5 & 4			
