= 1948 Women's Western Open =

Golf tournament

Coordinates: 42.1863°N 88.0007°W

Tournament information
- Dates: June 21–26, 1948
- Location: Long Grove, Illinois
- Course: Skycrest Country Club
- Format: Stroke play/match play

Statistics
- Par: 74
- Length: 6,434 yards (5,883 m)
- Field: 154 players, 32 to match play
- Cut: 89 (+15)
- Prize fund: $500
- Winner's share: $500

Champion
- Patty Berg
- def. Babe Zaharias, 37 holes
- Location within the United States Location within Illinois

The 1948 Women's Western Open was a golf competition held at Skycrest Country Club, now known as the Twin Orchard Country Club, in Long Grove, Illinois from June 21–26. It was the 19th edition of the Women's Western Open.

The field of 154 golfers played an 18-hole qualifying round to determine the 32 players advancing to match play. Margaret Gunther won medalist honors with a qualifying round of 76 (+2). Match play was over 18 holes for each round except the 36-hole final. After the first round of match play, six professional and ten amateur golfers remained in the field.

Patty Berg won the championship in match play competition by defeating Babe Zaharias in the final match in 37 holes. Berg earned the entire purse of $500 and returned the money to the Women's Western Golf Association for their junior golf program.

== Final 16 bracket ==
Round of 16; June 23
Mary Agnes Wall (a)	4&3
Margaret Gunther (a)
Helen Dettweiler	1up
Betty Jameson
Babe Zaharias	5&4
Mary McMillan (a)
Polly Riley (a)	6&5
Bettye Mims White
Beverly Hanson (a)	2&1
Shirley Spork
Grace Lenczyk (a)	4&2
Pattie Blanton (a)
Patty Berg	1up
Phyllis Otto Germain (a)
Claire Doran (a)	4&2
Marjorie Row (a)

Quarterfinals; June 24
Mary Agnes Wall (a)
Helen Dettweiler	1up
Babe Zaharias	3&2
Polly Riley (a)
Beverly Hanson (a)	9&7
Grace Lenczyk (a)
Patty Berg	3&2
Claire Doran (a)

Semifinals; June 25
Helen Dettweiler	6&4
Babe Zaharias
Beverly Hanson (a)	21h
Patty Berg

Finals; June 26
Babe Zaharias
Patty Berg	37h
