= 1938 Titleholders Championship =

Golf tournament in Augusta, Georgia, US

The 1938 Titleholders Championship was contested from January 13–16 at Augusta Country Club. It was the 2nd edition of the Titleholders Championship.

Patty Berg won her second consecutive Titleholders with rounds of 78-79-77-77.

== Final leaderboard ==
Place	Player	Score	To par
1	(United States) Patty Berg	311	−5
2	(United States) Jane Cothran	325	+9
3	(United States) Marian McDougall	327	+11
4	(United States) Kathryn Hemphill	328	+12
