= 1937 Titleholders Championship =

Golf tournament in Augusta, Georgia, US

The 1937 Titleholders Championship was contested from January 15–17 at Augusta Country Club. It was the first edition of the Titleholders Championship.

This event was won by Patty Berg.

== Round summaries ==
=== First round ===
Place	Player	Score	To par
T1	(United States) Patty Berg	80	+1
T1	(United States) Jane Cothran	80	+1
T1	(United States) Helen Hicks	80	+1
4	(United States) Dorothy Kirby	83	+4
T5	(United States) Helen Dettweiler	86	+7
T5	(United States) Isabell Oglivie	86	+7
T5	(United States) Kathryn Hemphill	86	+7
8	(United States) Helen Waring	87	+8
9	(United States) Jean Bauer	89	+10
10	(United States) Babe Didriksen	90	+11

=== Second round ===
Place	Player	Score	To par
1	(United States) Helen Hicks	80-79=159	+1
T2	(United States) Jane Cothran	80-86=166	+8
T2	(United States) Dorothy Kirby	83-83=166	+8
4	(United States) Patty Berg	80-87=167	+9
5	(United States) Helen Dettweiler	86-87=173	+15
6	(United States) Isabell Oglivie	86-92=178	+20
7	(United States) Babe Didriksen	90-91=181	+23
8	(United States) Helen Waring	87-96=183	+25
9	(United States) Alice Rutherford	95-91=186	+25
10	(United States) Mrs. Reginald Maxwell	91-97=188	+27

=== Final round ===
Place	Player	Score	To par
1	(United States) Patty Berg	80-87-73=240	+3
2	(United States) Dorothy Kirby	83-83-77=243	+6
3	(United States) Helen Hicks	80-79-85=244	+7
4	(United States) Jane Cothran	80-86-83=249	+12
5	(United States) Kathryn Hemphill	86-84-81=251	+14
6	(United States) Helen Dettweiler	86-87-83=256	+18
7	(United States) Babe Didriksen	90-91-80=261	+23
8	(United States) Isabell Oglivie	86-92-87=265	+27
