= 1955 Titleholders Championship =

Golf tournament in Augusta, Georgia, US

The 1955 Titleholders Championship was contested from March 10–13 at Augusta Country Club. It was the 16th edition of the Titleholders Championship.

Patty Berg won her sixth Titleholders. Her score of 291 took two strokes off the previous record of 293 set by Louise Suggs in 1954.

== Final leaderboard ==
Place	Player	Score	To par	Money ($)
1	(United States) Patty Berg	76-68-74-73=291	+3	1,000
2	(United States) Mary Lena Faulk	72-73-74-74=293	+5	700
3	(United States) Betsy Rawls	77-69-78-73=297	+9	600
4	(United States) Louise Suggs	71-77-80-73=301	+13	500
5	(United States) Marlene Bauer	78-71-77-77=303	+15	425
6	(United States) Mickey Wright	77-77-75-75=304	+16	350
T7	(Uruguay) Fay Crocker	80-76-76-74=306	+18	280
T7	(United States) Babe Zaharias	75-75-78-78=306	+18	280
T7	(United States) Pat Lesser (a)	75-74-80-77=306	+18	0
10	(United States) Marilynn Smith	74-77-81-76=308	+20	200
