= 1955 Women's Western Open =

Golf tournament

Coordinates: 43.1142°N 89.37°W

Tournament information
- Dates: June 23–26, 1955
- Location: Madison, Wisconsin
- Course: Maple Bluff Country Club
- Tour: LPGA Tour
- Format: 72 holes, stroke play

Statistics
- Par: 73
- Length: 6,259 yards (5,723 m)
- Field: 69 players, 32 after cut
- Cut: 166 (+20)
- Prize fund: $5,000
- Winner's share: $1,000

Champion
- Patty Berg
- 292 (E)
- Location within the United States Location within Wisconsin

The 1955 Women's Western Open was contested from June 23–26 at Maple Bluff Country Club in Madison, Wisconsin. It was the 26th edition of the Women's Western Open and the first played at stroke play.

The tournament was won by Patty Berg, her fifth Western Open title.

== Final leaderboard ==
Place	Player	Score	To par
1	(United States) Patty Berg	73-75-71-73=292	E
T2	(Uruguay) Fay Crocker	76-72-72-74=294	+2
T2	(United States) Louise Suggs	65-77-78-74=294	+2
4	(United States) Mickey Wright	72-73-77-75=297	+5
5	(United States) Marlene Bauer	78-73-73-75=299	+7
T6	(United States) Betty Hicks	80-74-71-73=301	+9
T6	(United States) Betsy Rawls	76-74-76-75=301	+9
8	(United States) Beverly Hanson	71-75-74-79=302	+10
9	(United States) Mary Lena Faulk	76-75-75-77=303	+11
10	(United States) Jackie Pung	71-78-77-75=304	+12
