= 1940 Titleholders Championship =

Golf tournament in Augusta, Georgia, US

The 1940 Titleholders Championship was contested from January 16–19 at Augusta Country Club. It was the 4th edition of the Titleholders Championship.

This event was won by Helen Hicks.

== Final leaderboard ==
Place	Player	Score	To par
1	(United States) Helen Hicks Harb	336	+36
2	(United States) Helen Dettweiler	337	+37
3	(United States) Jean Bauer	349	+49
4	(United States) Elizabeth Dunn	370	+70
5	(United States) Lucille G. Pray	373	+73
