= 1953 Titleholders Championship =

Golf tournament in Augusta, Georgia, US

The 1953 Titleholders Championship was contested from March 12–15 at Augusta Country Club. It was the 14th edition of the Titleholders Championship.

Patty Berg won her fifth Titleholders. Her score of 294 broke the previous record of 298 set by Babe Zaharias in 1950.

== Final leaderboard ==
Place	Player	Score	To par
1	(United States) Patty Berg	72-74-73-75=294	+6
2	(United States) Betsy Rawls	74-75-78-76=303	+15
3	(United States) Louise Suggs	75-75-78-78=306	+18
4	(United States) Mary Lena Faulk (a)	78-78-76-76=308	+20
5	(United States) Jackie Pung	79-77-75-79=310	+22
T6	(United States) Betty Jameson	77-80-74-81=312	+24
T6	(United States) Marilynn Smith	78-77-79-80=312	+24
T6	(United States) Babe Zaharias	78-78-81-75=312	+24
9	(United States) Alice Bauer Hagge	80-78-79-76=313	+25
T10	(United States) Peggy Kirk	79-84-73-79=315	+27
T10	(United States) Bee McWane (a)	74-81-81-79=315	+27
