= Women's Western Open =

American professional golf tournament

Tournament information
- Location: various, U.S.
- Established: 1930
- Tour: LPGA Tour
- Format: Stroke play (1955–1967); Match play (1930–1954)
- Prize fund: $10,000
- Month played: August
- Final year: 1967, 59 years ago

Final champion
- (United States) Kathy Whitworth

The Women's Western Open was an American professional golf tournament founded in 1930. The LPGA was established in 1950, and it recognized the Western Open as one of its major championships through 1967. All of the events back to 1930 have been designated as majors by the LPGA.

Organized by the Women's Western Golf Association, the tournament was match play through 1954, then became a 72-hole stroke play event. All of the winners were American.

== Winners ==
=== Stroke play era ===
Year	Winner	Score	Runner(s)-up	Winner's share ($)	Course	Location	Ref
1967	Kathy Whitworth	289 (−11)	(United States) Sandra Haynie	1,500	Pekin CC	Pekin, Illinois	
1966	Mickey Wright (3)	302 (+2)	(Australia) Margie Masters (United States) Jo Ann Prentice	1,500	Rainbow Springs CC	Mukwonago, Wisconsin	
1965	Susie Maxwell	290 (−2)	(United States) Marlene Hagge	1,500	Beverly CC	Chicago, Illinois	
1964	Carol Mann	308 (+8)	(United States) Ruth Jessen (United States) Judy Kimball-Simon	1,200	Scenic Hills CC	Pensacola, Florida	
1963	Mickey Wright (2)	292 (E)	(United States) Kathy Whitworth	1,200	Maple Bluff CC	Madison, Wisconsin	
1962	Mickey Wright	295 (+7)^{PO}	(United States) Mary Lena Faulk	1,200	Montgomery CC	Montgomery, Alabama	
1961	Mary Lena Faulk	290 (−10)	(United States) Betsy Rawls	1,313	Belle Meade CC	Nashville, Tennessee	
1960	Joyce Ziske	301 (+9)^{PO}	(United States) Barbara Romack	1,313	Beverly CC	Chicago, Illinois	
1959	Betsy Rawls (2)	293 (+5)	(United States) JoAnne Gunderson (a) (United States) Patty Berg	1,400	Ranier G&CC	Seattle, Washington	
1958	Patty Berg (7)	293 (+1)	(United States) Beverly Hanson	950	Kahkwa CC	Erie, Pennsylvania	
1957	Patty Berg (6)	291 (−1)	(United States) Wiffi Smith	1,000	Montgomery CC	Montgomery, Alabama	
1956	Beverly Hanson	304 (E)	(United States) Louise Suggs	1,000	Wakonda CC	Des Moines, Iowa	
1955	Patty Berg (5)	292 (E)	(Uruguay) Fay Crocker (United States) Louise Suggs	1,000	Maple Bluff CC	Madison, Wisconsin	

=== Match play era ===
Year	Winner	Score	Runner-up	Winner's share ($)	Course	Location	Ref
1954	Betty Jameson (2)	6 & 5	(United States) Louise Suggs	1,000	Glen Flora CC	Waukegan, Illinois	
1953	Louise Suggs (4)	6 & 5	(United States) Patty Berg	1,000	Capital City Club	Atlanta, Georgia	
1952	Betsy Rawls	1 up	(United States) Betty Jameson	1,000	Skokie CC	Chicago, Illinois	
1951	Patty Berg (4)	2 up	(United States) Pat O'Sullivan (a)	500	Whitemarsh Valley CC	Philadelphia, Pennsylvania	
1950	Babe Zaharias (4)	5 & 3	(United States) Peggy Kirk	500	Cherry Hills CC	Denver, Colorado	
1949	Louise Suggs (3)	5 & 4	(United States) Betty Jameson	500	Oklahoma City CC	Oklahoma City, Oklahoma	
1948	Patty Berg (3)	37 holes	(United States) Babe Zaharias	500	Skycrest CC	Chicago, Illinois	
1947	Louise Suggs (a) (2)	4 & 2	(United States) Dorothy Kirby (a)		Capital City Club	Atlanta, Georgia	
1946	Louise Suggs (a)	2 up	(United States) Patty Berg		Wakonda Club	Des Moines, Iowa	
1945	Babe Zaharias (a) (3)	4 & 2	(United States) Dorothy Germain (a)		Highland G&CC	Indianapolis, Indiana	
1944	Babe Zaharias (a) (2)	7 & 5	(United States) Dorothy Germain (a)		Park Ridge	Chicago, Illinois	
1943	Patty Berg (2)	1 up	(United States) Dorothy Kirby (a)		Glen Oak CC	Glen Ellyn, Illinois	
1942	Betty Jameson (a)	9 & 7	(United States) Phyllis Otto (a)		Elmhurst CC	Chicago, Illinois	
1941	Patty Berg	7 & 6	(United States) Olga Strashun Weil (a)	100	Cincinnati CC	Cincinnati, Ohio	
1940	Babe Zaharias (a)	5 & 4	(United States) Lucile Mann (a)		Blue Mound G&CC	Wauwatosa, Wisconsin	
1939	Helen Dettweiler	4 & 3	(United States) Bea Barrett (a)		Westwood CC	St. Louis, Missouri	
1938	Bea Barrett (a)	6 & 4	(United States) Helen Hofmann (a)		Broadmoor GC	Colorado Springs, Colorado	
1937	Helen Hicks	6 & 5	(United States) Bea Barrett (a)		Beverly CC	Chicago, Illinois	
1936	Opal Hill (a) (2)	3 & 2	(United States) Virginia Wilson Dennehy (a)		Topeka CC	Topeka, Kansas	
1935	Opal Hill (a)	9 & 7	(United States) Elaine Rosenthal Reinhardt (a)		Sunset Ridge CC	Chicago, Illinois	
1934	Marian McDougall (a)	9 & 7	(United States) Bessie Riegel (a)		Portland G&CC	Portland, Oregon	
1933	June Beebe (a) (2)	3 & 2	(United States) Jane Weiller (a)		Olympia Fields CC	Olympia Fields, Illinois	
1932	Jane Weiller (a)	5 & 4	(United States) June Beebe (a)		Ozaukee CC	Mequon, Wisconsin	
1931	June Beebe (a)	3 & 2	(United States) Rose Jones (a)		Midlothian CC	Midlothian, Illinois	
1930	Lucia Mida (a)	6 & 5	(United States) June Beebe (a)		Acacia CC	Indian Head Park, Illinois	

(a) - denotes amateur
^{PO} - won in playoff

== Multiple winners ==
This table lists the golfers who have won more than one Women's Western Open as a major championship. Louise Suggs and Mickey Wright, by virtue of their multiple victories, became the first and second golfers to claim the women's Grand Slam.

Country	Golfer	Total	Years
United States	Patty Berg	7	1941, 1943, 1948, 1951, 1955, 1957, 1958
United States	Babe Zaharias	4	1940, 1944, 1945, 1950
United States	Louise Suggs	4	1946, 1947, 1949, 1953
United States	Mickey Wright	3	1962, 1963, 1966
United States	June Beebe	2	1931, 1933
United States	Opal Hill	2	1935, 1936
United States	Betty Jameson	2	1942, 1954
United States	Betsy Rawls	2	1952, 1959

== Winners by nationality ==
All of the champions were from the United States.

Nationality	Number of wins
United States	38

== See also ==
- Western Open - a men's event on the PGA Tour
