= 1939 Titleholders Championship =

Golf tournament in Augusta, Georgia, US

The 1939 Titleholders Championship was contested from January 16–19 at Augusta Country Club. It was the 3rd edition of the Titleholders Championship.

Patty Berg won her third consecutive Titleholders.

== Final leaderboard ==
Place	Player	Score	To par
1	(United States) Patty Berg	78-78-83-80=319	+19
2	(United States) Dorothy Kirby	82-81-82-76=321	+21
T3	(United States) Helen Hicks	81-81-85-84=331	+31
T3	(United States) Marion Miley	79-81-88-83=331	+31
5	(United States) Kathryn Hemphill	80-82-87-84=333	+33
6	(United States) Laddie Irwin	87-82-88-81=338	+38
7	(United States) Opal Hill	87-90-86-90=353	+53
8	(United States) Isabel Ogilvie	87-88-95-86=356	+56
9	(United States) Helen Waring	92-90-88-91=362	+62
10	(United States) Lillia Watson	94-90-93-88=365	+65
