= 1939 Women's Western Open =

Golf tournament

The 1939 Women's Western Open was a golf tournament held at Westwood Country Club in Westwood, Missouri near St. Louis. It was the 10th edition of the Women's Western Open. Helen Dettweiler won the championship in match play competition by defeating defending champion Bea Barrett in the final match, 4 and 3.
