= 1941 Women's Western Open =

The 1941 Women's Western Open was a golf competition held at Cincinnati Country Club in Cincinnati, Ohio. It was the 12th edition of the Women's Western Open. Patty Berg won the championship in match play competition by defeating Olga Strashun Weil in the final match, 7 and 6.
