= Marian McDougall =

American golfer

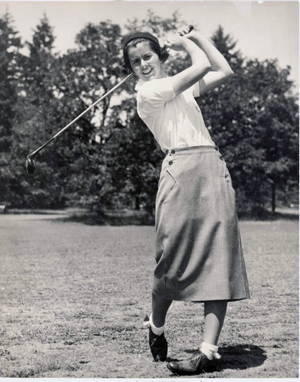

Personal information
- Full name: Marian McDougall Herron
- Nationality: United States
- Born: September 2, 1913 Portland, Oregon, U.S.
- Died: May 14, 2009 (aged 95)
- Spouse: Joseph Herron

Career
- Sport: Golf
- Status: Amateur

Best results in LPGA major championships (wins: 1)
- Western Open: Won: 1934
- Titleholders C'ship: 3rd: 1938

Marian McDougall (September 2, 1913 – May 14, 2009) was an American amateur golfer from Portland, Oregon. She married a man named Joseph Herron and is sometimes referred to an Marian Herron or Marian McDougall Herron. She was a third generation member of Waverley Country Club. In 1934, she won the Women's Western Open, which was later designated as a major championship by the LPGA. She was inducted into Pacific Northwest Golf Hall of Fame in 1979.

== Tournaments wins ==
This is a selective list.

- Pacific Northwest Golf Association Women's Amateur Championship: 1934, 1936, 1937, 1938, 1939, 1948;
- Women's Western Open: 1934
- Oregon Women's Amateur Championship: 1936, 1937, 1939, 1940
- Oregon Women's Open Amateur Championship: 1935
- Oregon Junior Girls' Championship: 1930, 1931

== Major championships ==
=== Wins (1) ===
| Year | Championship | Winning score | Runner-up |
|---|---|---|---|
| 1934 | Women's Western Open | 9 & 7 | (United States) Mrs. Guy Riegel (a) |
