= Sand Hills Historic District =

Historic district in Georgia, United States

- Sand Hill Historic District
- U.S. National Register of Historic Places
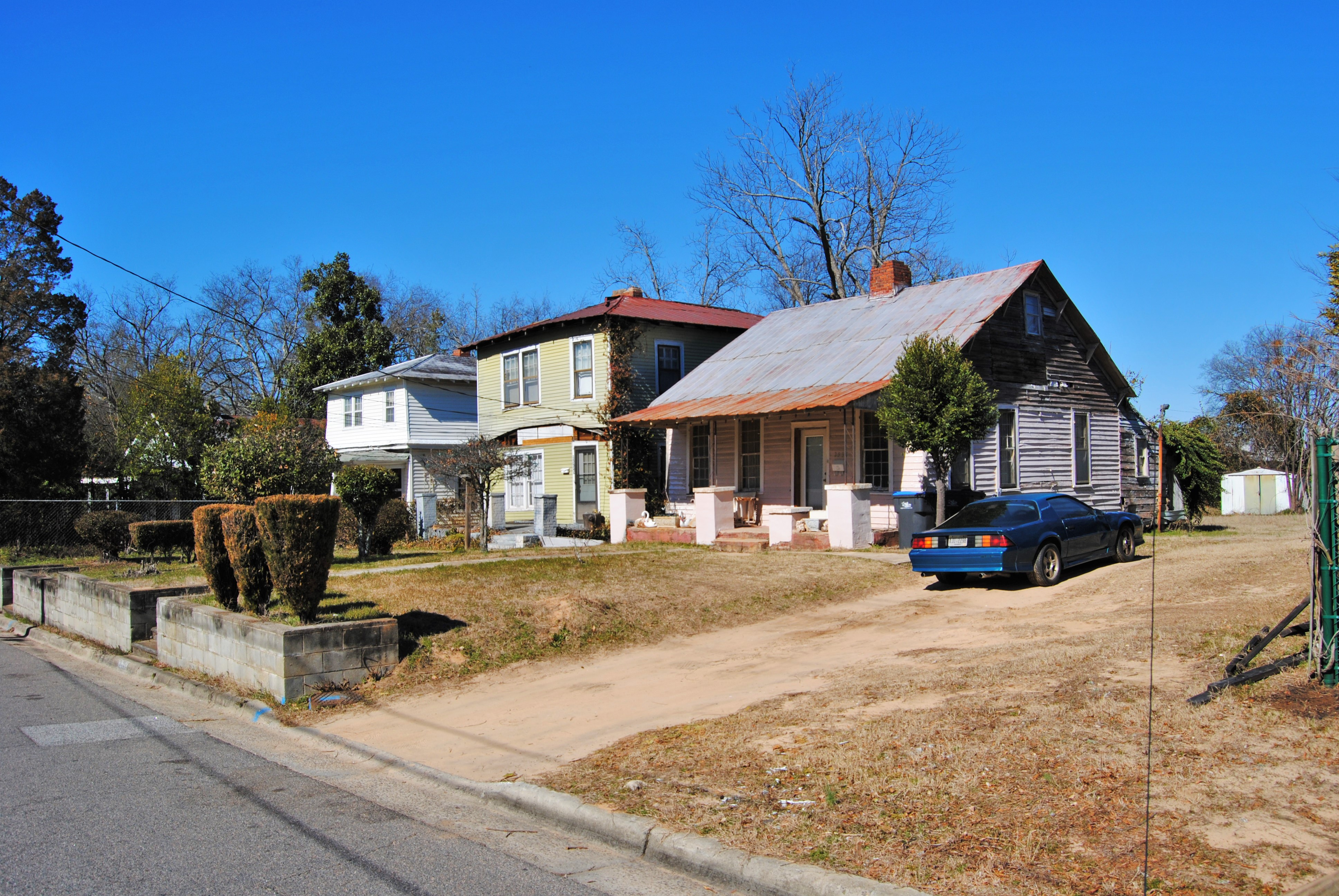
- Homes in 2500 block of Mt. Auburn Avenue, in 2015

- Location within Georgia
- Location: Roughly bounded by Monte Sano and North View Aves., Mount Auburn St., Johns Rd., and Augusta Country Club., Augusta, Georgia
- Coordinates: 33.483333°N 82.020278°W
- Area: 231 acres (0.93 km^{2})
- Built: 1874
- Architectural style: Colonial Revival, Mission/spanish Revival, Tudor Revival
- NRHP reference No.: 97000754
- Added to NRHP: July 9, 1997

The Sand Hills Historic District in Augusta, Georgia is a historic district which was listed on the National Register of Historic Places in 1997. The district included 334 contributing buildings and a contributing site in a 231 acres (0.93 km^{2}) area roughly bounded by Monte Sano and North View Aves., Mount Auburn St., Johns Rd., and the Augusta Country Club.

It is also known as Elizabethtown Historic District.

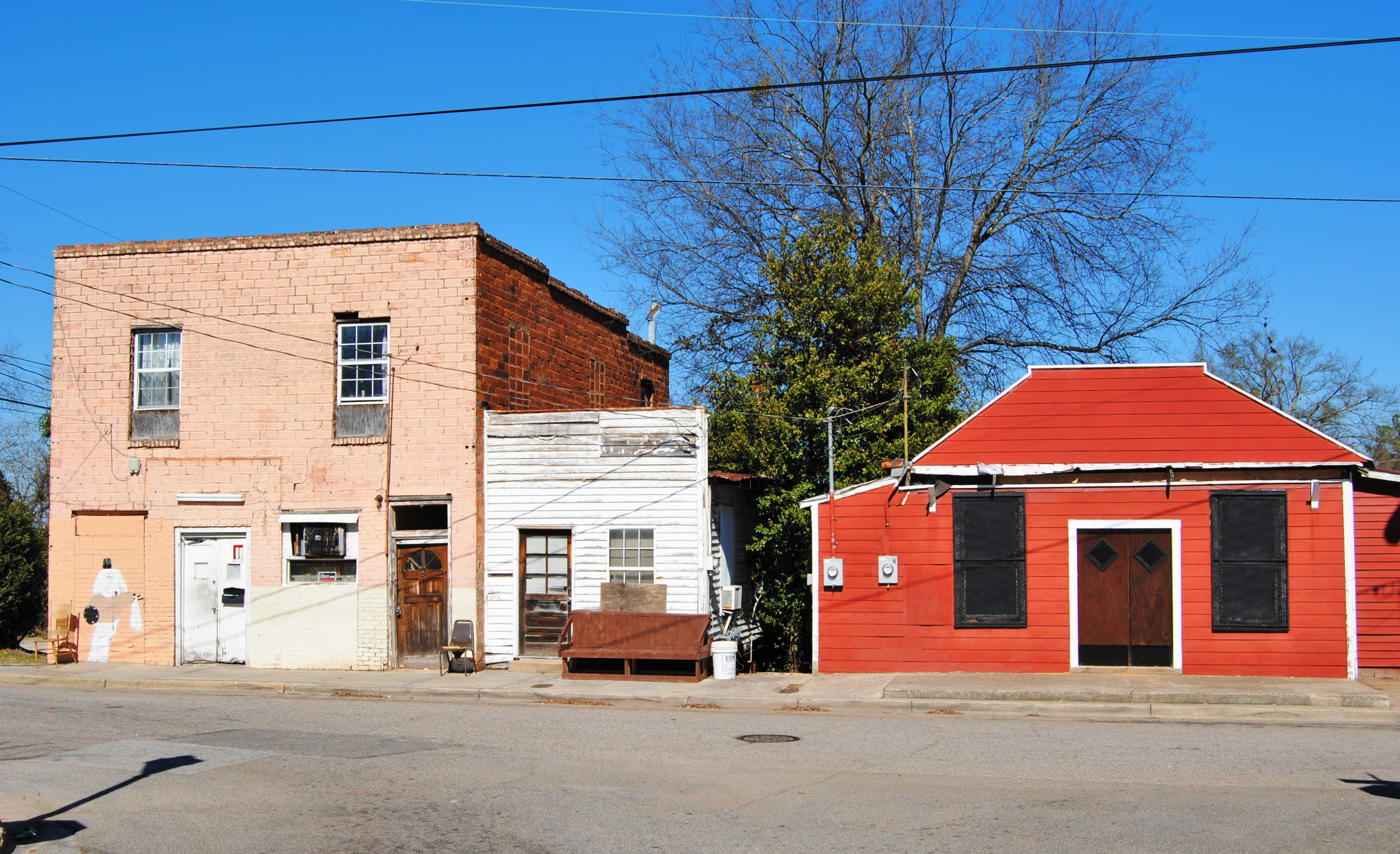
Buildings on Fleming Avenue

The district "is a historic African-American neighborhood located in the western part of Augusta adjacent to the National Register-listed Summerville Historic District. The neighborhood is laid out in an incomplete grid pattern and consists of a historic African-American cemetery, residential buildings, commercial buildings, community landmark buildings, and landscaped yards and median of a road. The neighborhood's development is closely associated with the development of the Summerville neighborhood. The Sand Hills Historic District has statewide significance in the areas of Architecture, Ethnic Heritage: African American, Community Planning and Development, and Landscape Architecture."

It is roughly bounded by Monte Sano Ave., North View Avenue, Mount Auburn Street, Johns Road, and the Augusta Country Club.

It borders on the Augusta Country Club, which itself borders on the Augusta National Golf Club.

== See also ==
- Sand Hills region of Georgia and the Carolinas
- Sand Hills cottage architecture
