= 1957 Titleholders Championship =

Golf tournament in Augusta, Georgia, US

The 1957 Titleholders Championship was contested from March 14–17 at Augusta Country Club. It was the 18th edition of the Titleholders Championship.

Patty Berg won her seventh and final Titleholders.

== Final leaderboard ==
Place	Player	Score	To par	Money ($)
1	(United States) Patty Berg	78-71-78-69=296	+8	1,000
2	(United States) Anne Quast (a)	72-78-75-74=299	+11	0
3	(United States) Marlene Hagge	74-76-77-74=301	+13	750
4	(United States) Wiffi Smith	74-75-79-75=303	+15	600
T5	(United States) Kathy Cornelius	77-74-79-74=304	+16	475
T5	(United States) Mickey Wright	73-75-78-78=304	+16	475
T7	(United States) Ruth Jessen	79-71-78-77=305	+17	375
T7	(United States) Betsy Rawls	76-78-78-73=305	+17	375
9	(United States) Betty Jameson	74-76-77-81=308	+20	300
10	(United States) Anne Richardson (a)	76-75-79-79=309	+21	0
