= Hardscrabble Open =

American golf tournament

The Hardscrabble Open, also known as the Hardscrabble Women's Invitation, was a golf tournament played at the Hardscrabble Golf Club in Fort Smith, Arkansas, from 1945 to 1953. It was an official LPGA Tour event from 1948 to 1950.

== Winners ==
- 1953 Bettye Danoff
- 1952 Betty Jameson
- 1951 Mary Lena Faulk
- 1950 Patty Berg
- 1949 Patty Berg
- 1948 Patty Berg
- 1947 Babe Zaharias
- 1946 Betty Jameson
- 1945 Margaret Gunther
