= 1942 Titleholders Championship =

Golf tournament in Augusta, Georgia, US

The 1942 Titleholders Championship was contested from March 31 to April 2 at Augusta Country Club. It was the 6th edition of the Titleholders Championship.

Dorothy Kirby won her second consecutive Titleholders.

== Final leaderboard ==
Place	Player	Score	To par
1	(United States) Dorothy Kirby	79-77-83=239	+14
2	(United States) Eileen Stulb	86-78-83=244	+19
3	(United States) Louise Suggs	80-81-85=246	+21
T4	(United States) Helen Hicks	85-77-85=247	+22
T4	(United States) Georgia Tainter	84-84-79=247	+22
