= American Women's Open =

Golf tournament formerly on the LPGA Tour

The American Women's Open was a golf tournament on the LPGA Tour from 1958 to 1961. It was played in the Minneapolis, Minnesota area: at the Brookview Country Club in Golden Valley in 1958 and 1959 and at the Hiawatha Golf Course in Minneapolis in 1960 and 1961.

== Winners ==
- 1961 Judy Kimball
- 1960 Patty Berg
- 1959 Beverly Hanson
- 1958 Patty Berg
