= 1951 Women's Western Open =

Golf tournament

Coordinates: 40.0950°N 75.2348°W

Tournament information
- Dates: June 18–23, 1951
- Location: Lafayette Hill, Pennsylvania
- Course: Whitemarsh Valley Country Club
- Tour: LPGA Tour
- Format: Stroke play/match play

Statistics
- Par: 75
- Length: 6,770 yards (6,190 m)
- Field: 99 players, 32 to match play
- Cut: 85 (+10)
- Prize fund: $500
- Winner's share: $500

Champion
- Patty Berg
- def. Pat O'Sullivan (a), 2 up
- Location within the United States Location within Pennsylvania

The 1951 Women's Western Open was a golf competition held at Whitemarsh Valley Country Club in Lafayette Hill, Pennsylvania from June 18–23. It was the 22nd edition of the event.

The field of 99 golfers played an 18-hole qualifying round to determine the 32 players advancing to match play. Louise Suggs won medalist honors with a qualifying round of 68 (−7). Match play was over 18 holes for each round except the 36-hole final. After the first round of match play, ten professional and six amateur golfers remained in the field.

Patty Berg won the championship in match play competition by defeating Pat O'Sullivan in the final match, 2 up. Berg earned the entire purse of $500.

== Final 16 bracket ==
Round of 16; June 20
Louise Suggs | 3&1
Carol Diringer (a)
Beverly Hanson | 2up
Annette Gessler (a)
Betsy Rawls | 21h
Betty MacKinnon
Pat O'Sullivan (a) | 4&2
Claire Doran (a)
Helen Dettweiler | 7&6
Patricia Devany (a)
Marjorie Lindsay (a) | 1up
Shirley Spork
Patty Berg | 1up
Babe Zaharias
Dorothy Germain Porter (a) | 3&2
Marlene Bauer

Quarterfinals; June 21
Louise Suggs | 7&5
Beverly Hanson
Betsy Rawls
Pat O'Sullivan (a) | 3&2
Helen Dettweiler
Marjorie Lindsay (a) | 2&1
Patty Berg | 4&3
Dorothy Germain Porter

Semifinals; June 22
Louise Suggs
Pat O'Sullivan (a) | 4&2
Marjorie Lindsay (a)
Patty Berg | 5&4

Finals; June 23
Pat O'Sullivan (a)
Patty Berg | 2up
