= Ellen Jean Griffin =

Ellen Griffin

Personal information
- Nationality: United States
- Born: December 19, 1919 Randleman, North Carolina, U.S.
- Died: October 1986 Raleigh, North Carolina, U.S.

Career
- Sport: Golf
- College: University of North Carolina at Greensboro; University of North Carolina Chapel Hill

Ellen Jean Griffin (1919–1986) was one of the pioneers of women's professional golf in the United States. She was also an educator, having taught physical education at Woman's College.

== Biography ==
Griffin was born on December 19, 1919, in Randleman, North Carolina. She learned how to play golf at an early age while her father was stationed at Fort Benning, Georgia. She obtained her bachelor's degree in Physical Education at the North Carolina Women's College (currently the University of North Carolina at Greensboro). After graduating in 1940, she pursued her master's degree at the University of North Carolina Chapel Hill. She was then employed as one of the faculties at UNCG, where she became the university's first female basketball coach.

Griffin also taught golf and established her own golf facility, which came to be known as The Farm. Later, she co-wrote some of the earliest books on golf instruction, which include the Golf Manual for Teachers.

While the Ladies Professional Golf Association (LPGA) is considered the most successful professional golf association for women, it was preceded by the Women's Professional Golf Association, which Griffin co-founded in 1944, along with Betty Hicks and Hope Seignious. The group emphasized in the WPGA charter that it was open to members of any race and economic background. The association was subsumed into the newly formed LPGA in 1950.

In 1962, Griffin was chosen as the LPGA's national "Teacher of the Year". She was also awarded the LPGA's National Golf Foundation Graffis Award in 1970 and was one of the first LPGA Master Professionals cited in 1978.

Griffin died in October 1986 due to complications from Crohn's disease. Three years later, the LPGA launched the Ellen Griffin Rolex Award in her honor.
