= Glen Oak Country Club =

Country club

Coordinates: 41.8778°N 88.0431°W

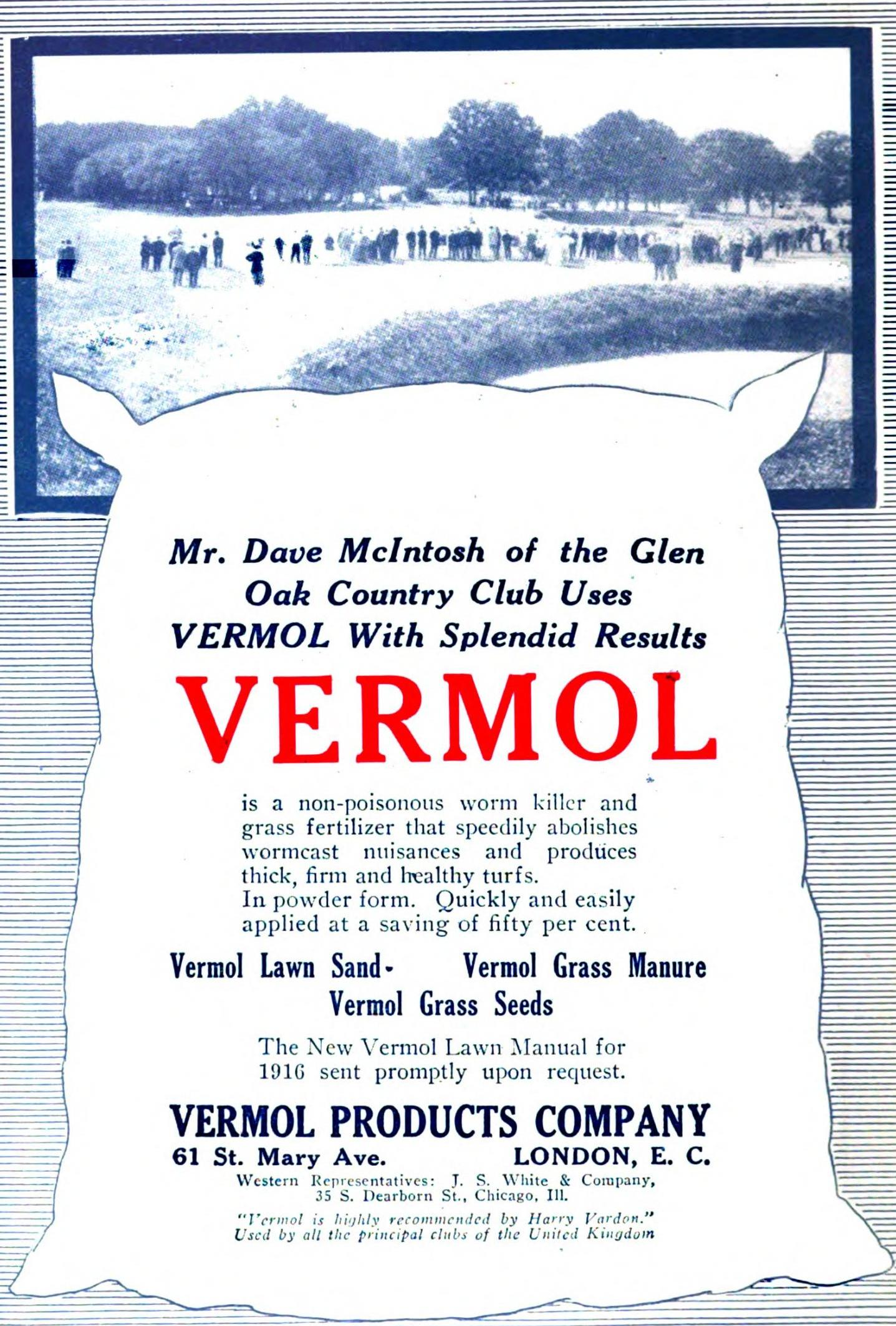
Glen Oak Country Club uses VERMOL photo ad from 1916.

Glen Oak Country Club is a country club and private golf course in Glen Ellyn, Illinois, that was designed by Tom Bendelow and established in 1911.

On January 7, 1909, the Pickwick Country Club was created. It had a 9-hole golf course, eventually expanded to 18 holes. Within a year, the club went bankrupt. In 1911, the property was purchased and reopened as the current Glen Oak Country Club.

In the past bordering the club to the north- which is the Prairie Path today, was an interurban train stop. Many members lived in Chicago and would take the train out of the city to this club. Upon exit, a carriage would take the members along Hill Ave to the club house.

Along with the golf course, it also has a swimming pool, and facility for trap shooting for member use on the club's south border. On the ninth hole, there is a Halfway House to refresh the players with drinks, beverages, and food. As the weather transitions from fall to winter many members change from golfing to The Skeet and Trap Club, which features a new remodeled Lodge area.

Over the years, the club has been expanded and remodeled to the club it is today.

Some of the famous people that have visited the club are famous athletes like MLB Players Jorge Soler, Carlos Zambrano, Basketball Hall of Famer Michael Jordan(basketball), Chicago Bulls Player Alex Caruso, Bobby Rahal (retired race car driver), Masters 4x Masters Champion Arnold Palmer(golfer), and PGA Golfer Mark Wilson.

== Golf ==
The club mascot is Pinky, a former caddie of whom there is a statue of in front of the club and a tournament named after him. The 18-hole course plays 6,503 yards and par 72 with a 72.1 rating. The course features relatively small greens protected by bunkers with fairways; it is especially notable for the extensive treeline on most holes. As of 2018, Danny Mulhearn is the head golf professional.

Harry "Lighthorse" Cooper winner of 31 PGA events, was the club professional from 1930 to 1937

The club hosted the 1943 Women's Western Open, won by Ladies Professional Golf Association (LPGA) co-founder Patty Berg, one of her still-record 15 LPGA Tour major championship wins. The club hosted the Professional Golfers' Association of America's (PGA) 1915 Western Open, won by Tom McNamara. The course hosted the Illinois PGA's 1962 Illinois Open Championship, won by John Paul Jones.

The club participates with a caddie program where the traditional caddie carries the golf bag for the members. Golf carts are available should the member not want to walk the course. The club also participates in the Evans Caddie College Scholarship.
