= 1958 Women's Western Open =

Golf tournament

Coordinates: 42.055°N 80.209°W

Tournament information
- Dates: June 19–22, 1958
- Location: Erie, Pennsylvania
- Course: Kahkwa Country Club
- Tour: LPGA Tour
- Format: 72 holes, stroke play

Statistics
- Par: 73
- Length: 6,370 yards (5,820 m)
- Field: 81 players, 32 after cut
- Cut: 169 (+23)
- Prize fund: $4,750
- Winner's share: $950

Champion
- Patty Berg
- 293 (+1)
- Location within the United States Location within Pennsylvania

The 1958 Women's Western Open was contested from June 19–22 at Kahkwa Country Club located in Erie, Pennsylvania. It was the 29th edition of the Women's Western Open.

This event was won by Patty Berg.

== Final leaderboard ==
Place	Player	Score	To par	Money ($)
1	(United States) Patty Berg	75-72-71-75=293	+1	950
2	(United States) Beverly Hanson	72-76-75-74=297	+5	652
3	(United States) Louise Suggs	76-75-75-73=299	+7	559
T4	(United States) Mary Lena Faulk	80-77-70-74=301	+9	431
T4	(United States) Mickey Wright	78-73-72-78=301	+9	431
6	(United States) Wiffi Smith	73-77-74-79=303	+11	326
7	(United States) Marilynn Smith	80-74-79-73=306	+14	289
T8	(United States) Kathy Cornelius	76-74-79-78=307	+15	210
T8	(United States) Jackie Pung	73-77-78-79=309	+15	210
T10	(United States) Marlene Bauer Hagge	71-82-76-79=308	+16	140
T10	(United States) Jo Ann Prentice	76-77-79-76=308	+16	140
T10	(United States) Joyce Ziske	79-79-73-77=308	+16	140
