= Arkansas Open =

Former American golf tournament

The Arkansas Open was a golf tournament on the LPGA Tour, played only in 1956. It was played at the Country Club of Hot Springs in Hot Springs, Arkansas. Patty Berg won the event.
