= Sandhills Women's Open =

Golf tournament formerly on the LPGA Tour

The Sandhills Women's Open was a golf tournament on the LPGA Tour, played only in 1951. It was played at the Southern Pines Country Club in Pinehurst, North Carolina. Patty Berg won the event.
