= Westwood Country Club =

Country club in St. Louis, Missouri, United States

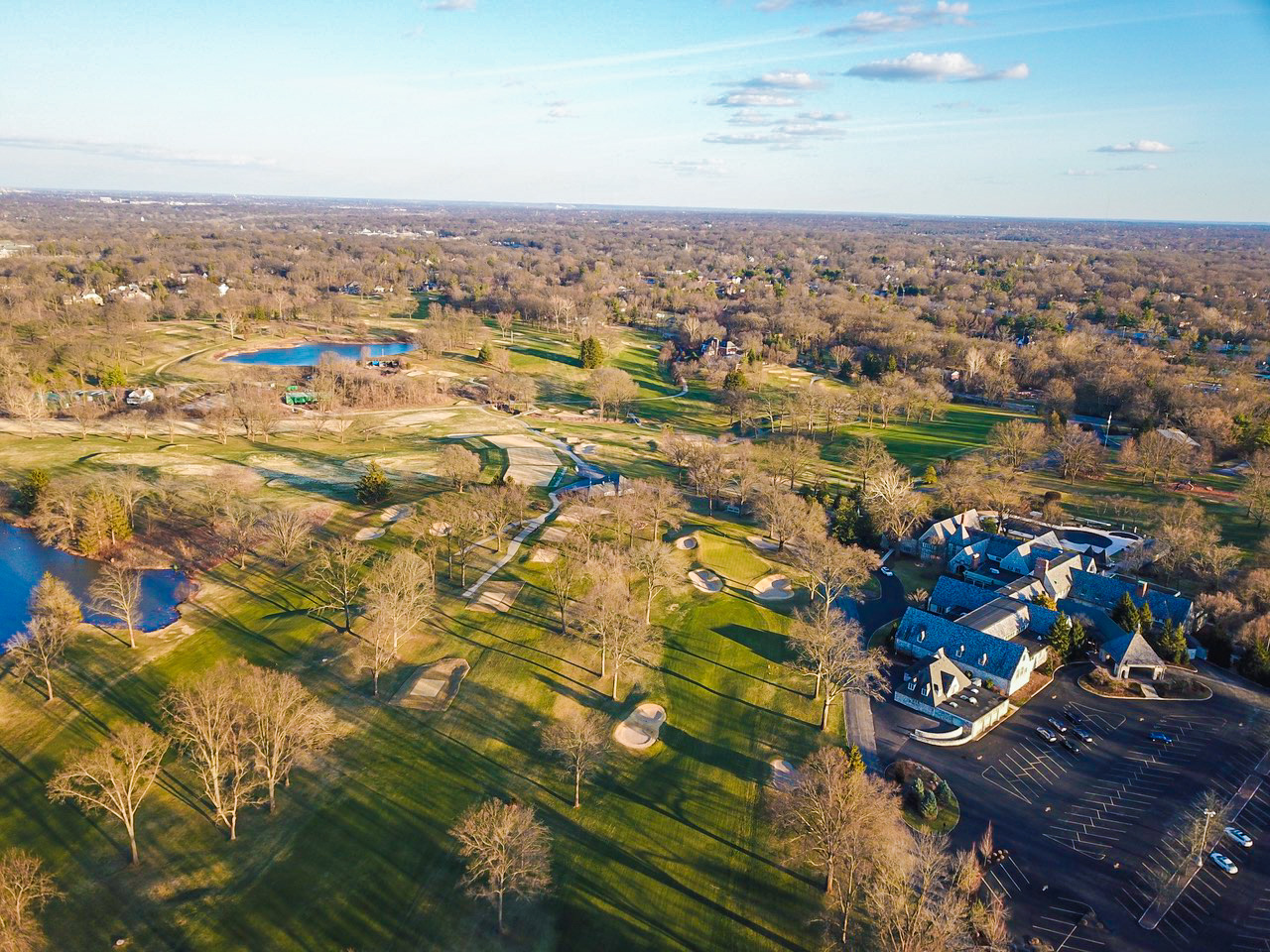
- The Main Building with Golf Course

- Location within the United States Location within Missouri
- 38°38′36″N 90°26′11″W

Club information
- Location: Westwood, Missouri
- Established: 1907
- Type: Private
- Total holes: 27
- Tournaments: 1938 Western Open; 1952 Western Open; 1939 Women's Western Open
- Website: westwood-cc.com
- Designed by: Harold Paddock

Westwood Country Club is a country club in Westwood, Missouri, in central St. Louis County, Missouri.

Westwood Country Club is one of the "big four" elite St. Louis area country clubs, along with St. Louis Country Club, Old Warson Country Club, and Bellerive Country Club. Membership is about 650 families, mostly (although no longer entirely) Jewish.

The par-72 18-hole golf course was designed by Harold Paddock and built in 1928. The course was more recently renovated under the direction of golf architect Keith Foster. The club does not now tend to favor hosting large golf tournaments, although the 1952 Western Open and 1939 Women's Western Open were held there. There are four Har-Tru and six Deco Turf tennis courts and an Olympic-size swimming pool.

The club was founded in 1907 specifically to provide a Jewish country club for the St. Louis area, during a time when most country clubs excluded Jews from membership. It was first built in the town of Glendale. By 1927 many of the members' households had moved westward to the Central West End and the towns of Clayton and Ladue, so farmland was purchased in what is now Westwood and a new club built, with the course designed by Paddock and the clubhouse by the firm of Maritz and Young. There were, at that time, also riding stables.

We do not participate in things like [disclosing the slope rating of the golf course], because Westwood is a very, very private club. I don't think the members would want their club featured with any type of prominence. It's just not consistent with who we are.

— Tony D'Errico (former General Manager & Chief Operating Officer, Westwood Country Club)

The club maintains a low public profile (there is no sign at the entrance, and the address was unpublished until recently) and a refined ambiance; conducting business on the premises is frowned upon. Membership criteria remains rather selective, favoring successive generations of families.

The club was ranked 29th in the 2012 Platinum Clubs of America list of top full-service country clubs.
