= Eileen Stulb =

American golfer (1923–2007)

Personal information
- Full name: Eileen Heffernan Stulb
- Nickname: Stubbie
- Nationality: United States
- Born: June 23, 1923 Augusta, Georgia, U.S.
- Died: February 26, 2007 (aged 83) Augusta, Georgia, U.S.

Career
- Sport: Golf
- College: Augusta College
- Status: Amateur

Best results in LPGA major championships
- Titleholders C'ship: 2nd: 1942, 1946
- U.S. Women's Open: T27: 1951

Eileen Heffernan Stulb (June 23, 1923 – February 26, 2007) was an American amateur golfer.

== Early life ==
In 1923, Stulb was born in Augusta, Georgia to Marion C. Stulb and Eileen Anna Heffernan Stulb.

== Golfing career ==
Stulb finished second twice at the Titleholders Championship in 1942 and 1946. She made the cut once at the U.S. Women's Open in 1951, when she finished in a tie for 27th place. Stulb was a two-time champion of the Georgia State Women's Amateur tournament. She was a quarterfinalist at the Women's Western Amateur on two occasions.

Stulb was the owner of an advertising agency in Augusta. When Fred Corcoran was rehired back on by the LPGA Tour, Stulb was hired to do public relations for the LPGA Tour in the late 1950s and 1960s.

== Personal life ==
Stulb died in Augusta, Georgia.
