= 1957 Women's Western Open =

Golf tournament

Coordinates: 32.3521°N 86.2807°W

Tournament information
- Dates: April 25–28, 1957
- Location: Montgomery, Alabama
- Course: Montgomery Country Club
- Tour: LPGA Tour
- Format: 72 holes, stroke play

Statistics
- Par: 73
- Length: 6,330 yards (5,790 m)
- Field: 88 players, 32 after cut
- Cut: 168 (+22)
- Prize fund: $5,000
- Winner's share: $1,000

Champion
- Patty Berg
- 291 (–1)
- Location within the United States Location within Alabama

The 1957 Women's Western Open was contested from April 25–28 at Montgomery Country Club in Montgomery, Alabama. It was the 28th edition of the Women's Western Open.

This event was won by Patty Berg.

== Final leaderboard ==
Place	Player	Score	To par
1	(United States) Patty Berg	72-70-75-74=291	−1
2	(United States) Wiffi Smith	71-70-71-80=292	E
T3	(United States) Louise Suggs	71-75-77-74=297	+5
T3	(United States) Mickey Wright	71-71-78-77=297	+5
5	(United States) Anne Richardson (a)	73-72-80-74=299	+7
T6	(United States) Betty Dodd	71-72-75-82=300	+8
T6	(United States) Beverly Hanson	75-76-74-75=300	+8
T8	(United States) Mary Lena Faulk	75-76-71-79=301	+9
T8	(United States) Betsy Rawls	72-76-74-79=301	+9
10	(Uruguay) Fay Crocker	76-78-73-75=302	+10
