= Bettye Danoff =

American golfer (1923–2011)

Personal information
- Full name: Bettye Jane Mims Danoff
- Nickname: Mighty Mite
- Nationality: United States
- Born: May 21, 1923 Dallas, Texas, U.S.
- Died: December 22, 2011 (aged 88) McKinney, Texas, U.S.
- Height: 5 ft 2 in (1.57 m)

Career
- Sport: Golf
- Turned professional: 1949
- Former tour: LPGA Tour (founding member)
- Professional wins: 1

Best results in LPGA major championships
- U.S. Women's Open: 15th: 1952

Achievements and awards
- World Golf Hall of Fame: 2024 (member page)

Bettye Jane Danoff (née Mims; May 21, 1923 – December 22, 2011) was an American professional golfer. She was one of the 13 founding members of the LPGA, in 1950.

== Career ==
Danoff began playing golf at the age of 6. Her parents had opened a driving range and nine-hole golf course in Grand Prairie Texas. She also played under the names Bettye Mims White and Bettye Mims Danoff.

The LPGA Tour was not founded until 1950. Before then, she won four straight Dallas Women's Golf Association Championships in addition to two Texas Women's Amateur Championship. In 1947, she defeated Babe Zaharias, 1 up, in the Texas Women's Open. Zaharias had won 17 consecutive tournaments before losing to Danoff. Also before her LPGA days, Danoff played exhibitions with PGA Tour stars.

After the death of her husband in 1961, Dannoff largely retired.

== Personal life ==
Danoff was a mother to three daughters who traveled with her as she played off the LPGA Tour. She was the LPGA Tour's first grandmother.

== Amateur wins ==
- 1947 Texas Women's Amateur
- 1948 Texas Women's Amateur

== Professional wins (1) ==
- 1953 Hardscrabble Open
