= AP Athlete of the Year =

American annual sports award

The first Athlete of the Year award in the United States was initiated by the Associated Press (AP) in 1931. At a time when women in sports were not given the same recognition as men, the AP offered a male and a female athlete of the year award to either a professional or amateur athlete. The awards are voted on annually by a panel of AP sports editors from across the United States, covering mainly American sports. As a result, a large majority of the winners have been Americans. However, non-Americans are also eligible for the honor and have won on a few occasions.

== AP Athlete of the Year ==
List of AP Athlete of the Year award winners
Year	Male		Female	
Year	Name	Sport	Name	Sport
1931	(United States) Pepper Martin	Major League Baseball	(United States) Helene Madison	Swimming
1932	(United States) Gene Sarazen	Golf	(United States) Babe Didrikson	Track and field
1933	(United States) Carl Hubbell	Major League Baseball	(United States) Helen Jacobs	Tennis
1934	(United States) Dizzy Dean	Major League Baseball	(United States) Virginia Van Wie	Golf
1935	(United States) Joe Louis	Boxing	(United States) Helen Wills Moody	Tennis
1936	(United States) Jesse Owens	Track and field	(United States) Helen Stephens	Track and field
1937	(United States) Don Budge	Tennis	(United States) Katherine Rawls	Swimming
1938	(United States) Don Budge (2)	Tennis	(United States) Patty Berg	Golf
1939	(United States) Nile Kinnick	College football	(United States) Alice Marble	Tennis
1940	(United States) Tom Harmon	College football	(United States) Alice Marble (2)	Tennis
1941	(United States) Joe DiMaggio	Major League Baseball	(United States) Betty Hicks Newell	Golf
1942	(United States) Frank Sinkwich	College football	(United States) Gloria Callen	Swimming
1943	(Sweden) Gunder Hägg	Track and field	(United States) Patty Berg (2)	Golf
1944	(United States) Byron Nelson	Golf	(United States) Ann Curtis	Swimming
1945	(United States) Byron Nelson (2)	Golf	(United States) Babe Didrikson Zaharias (2)	Golf
1946	(United States) Glenn Davis	College football	(United States) Babe Didrikson Zaharias (3)	Golf
1947	(United States) Johnny Lujack	College football	(United States) Babe Didrikson Zaharias (4)	Golf
1948	(United States) Lou Boudreau	Major League Baseball	(Netherlands) Fanny Blankers-Koen	Track and field
1949	(United States) Leon Hart	College football	(United States) Marlene Bauer	Golf
1950	(United States) Jim Konstanty	Major League Baseball	(United States) Babe Didrikson Zaharias (5)	Golf
1951	(United States) Dick Kazmaier	College football	(United States) Maureen Connolly	Tennis
1952	(United States) Bob Mathias	Track and field	(United States) Maureen Connolly (2)	Tennis
1953	(United States) Ben Hogan	Golf	(United States) Maureen Connolly (3)	Tennis
1954	(United States) Willie Mays	Major League Baseball	(United States) Babe Didrikson Zaharias (6)	Golf
1955	(United States) Howard Cassady	College football	(United States) Patty Berg (3)	Golf
1956	(United States) Mickey Mantle	Major League Baseball	(United States) Pat McCormick	Diving
1957	(United States) Ted Williams	Major League Baseball	(United States) Althea Gibson	Tennis
1958	(Australia) Herb Elliott	Track and field	(United States) Althea Gibson (2)	Tennis
1959	(Sweden) Ingemar Johansson	Boxing	(Brazil) Maria Bueno	Tennis
1960	(United States) Rafer Johnson	Track and field	(United States) Wilma Rudolph	Track and field
1961	(United States) Roger Maris	Major League Baseball	(United States) Wilma Rudolph (2)	Track and field
1962	(United States) Maury Wills	Major League Baseball	(Australia) Dawn Fraser	Swimming
1963	(United States) Sandy Koufax	Major League Baseball	(United States) Mickey Wright	Golf
1964	(United States) Don Schollander	Swimming	(United States) Mickey Wright (2)	Golf
1965	(United States) Sandy Koufax (2)	Major League Baseball	(United States) Kathy Whitworth	Golf
1966	(United States) Frank Robinson	Major League Baseball	(United States) Kathy Whitworth (2)	Golf
1967	(United States) Carl Yastrzemski	Major League Baseball	(United States) Billie Jean King	Tennis
1968	(United States) Denny McLain	Major League Baseball	(United States) Peggy Fleming	Figure skating
1969	(United States) Tom Seaver	Major League Baseball	(United States) Debbie Meyer	Swimming
1970	(United States) George Blanda	National Football League	(Taiwan) Chi Cheng	Track and field
1971	(United States) Lee Trevino	Golf	(Australia) Evonne Goolagong	Tennis
1972	(United States) Mark Spitz	Swimming	(Soviet Union) Olga Korbut	Gymnastics
1973	(United States) O. J. Simpson	National Football League	(United States) Billie Jean King (2)	Tennis
1974	(United States) Muhammad Ali	Boxing	(United States) Chris Evert	Tennis
1975	(United States) Fred Lynn	Major League Baseball	(United States) Chris Evert (2)	Tennis
1976	(United States) Bruce Jenner	Track and field	(Romania) Nadia Comăneci	Gymnastics
1977	(United States) Steve Cauthen	Horse racing	(United States) Chris Evert (3)	Tennis
1978	(United States) Ron Guidry	Major League Baseball	(United States) Nancy Lopez	Golf
1979	(United States) Willie Stargell	Major League Baseball	(United States) Tracy Austin	Tennis
1980	(United States) U.S. Olympic hockey team	Ice hockey	(United States) Chris Evert Lloyd (4)	Tennis
1981	(United States) John McEnroe	Tennis	(United States) Tracy Austin (2)	Tennis
1982	(Canada) Wayne Gretzky	National Hockey League	(United States) Mary Tabb	Track and field
1983	(United States) Carl Lewis	Track and field	(United States) Martina Navratilova	Tennis
1984	(United States) Carl Lewis (2)	Track and field	(United States) Mary Lou Retton	Gymnastics
1985	(United States) Dwight Gooden	Major League Baseball	(United States) Nancy Lopez (2)	Golf
1986	(United States) Larry Bird	National Basketball Association	(United States) Martina Navratilova (2)	Tennis
1987	(Canada) Ben Johnson	Track and field	(United States) Jackie Joyner-Kersee	Track and field
1988	(United States) Orel Hershiser	Major League Baseball	(United States) Florence Griffith Joyner	Track and field
1989	(United States) Joe Montana	National Football League	(West Germany) Steffi Graf	Tennis
1990	(United States) Joe Montana (2)	National Football League	(United States) Beth Daniel	Golf
1991	(United States) Michael Jordan	National Basketball Association	(Socialist Federal Republic of Yugoslavia) Monica Seles	Tennis
1992	(United States) Michael Jordan (2)	National Basketball Association	(Federal Republic of Yugoslavia) Monica Seles (2)	Tennis
1993	(United States) Michael Jordan (3)	National Basketball Association	(United States) Sheryl Swoopes	College basketball
1994	(United States) George Foreman	Boxing	(United States) Bonnie Blair	Speed skating
1995	(United States) Cal Ripken Jr.	Major League Baseball	(United States) Rebecca Lobo	College basketball
1996	(United States) Michael Johnson	Track and field	(United States) Amy Van Dyken	Swimming
1997	(United States) Tiger Woods	Golf	(Switzerland) Martina Hingis	Tennis
1998	(United States) Mark McGwire	Major League Baseball	(South Korea) Se Ri Pak	Golf
1999	(United States) Tiger Woods (2)	Golf	(United States) U.S. women's soccer team	Soccer
2000	(United States) Tiger Woods (3)	Golf	(United States) Marion Jones	Track and field
2001	(United States) Barry Bonds	Major League Baseball	(United States) Jennifer Capriati	Tennis
2002	(United States) Lance Armstrong	Road bicycle racing	(United States) Serena Williams	Tennis
2003	(United States) Lance Armstrong (2)	Road bicycle racing	(Sweden) Annika Sörenstam	Golf
2004	(United States) Lance Armstrong (3)	Road bicycle racing	(Sweden) Annika Sörenstam (2)	Golf
2005	(United States) Lance Armstrong (4)	Road bicycle racing	(Sweden) Annika Sörenstam (3)	Golf
2006	(United States) Tiger Woods (4)	Golf	(Mexico) Lorena Ochoa	Golf
2007	(United States) Tom Brady	National Football League	(Mexico) Lorena Ochoa (2)	Golf
2008	(United States) Michael Phelps	Swimming	(United States) Candace Parker	Women's National Basketball Association
2009	(United States) Jimmie Johnson	NASCAR	(United States) Serena Williams (2)	Tennis
2010	(United States) Drew Brees	National Football League	(United States) Lindsey Vonn	Skiing
2011	(United States) Aaron Rodgers	National Football League	(United States) Abby Wambach	Soccer
2012	(United States) Michael Phelps (2)	Swimming	(United States) Gabby Douglas	Gymnastics
2013	(United States) LeBron James	National Basketball Association	(United States) Serena Williams (3)	Tennis
2014	(United States) Madison Bumgarner	Major League Baseball	(United States) Mo'ne Davis	Little League baseball
2015	(United States) Stephen Curry	National Basketball Association	(United States) Serena Williams (4)	Tennis
2016	(United States) LeBron James (2)	National Basketball Association	(United States) Simone Biles	Gymnastics
2017	(Venezuela) Jose Altuve	Major League Baseball	(United States) Katie Ledecky	Swimming
2018	(United States) LeBron James (3)	National Basketball Association	(United States) Serena Williams (5)	Tennis
2019	(United States) Kawhi Leonard	National Basketball Association	(United States) Simone Biles (2)	Gymnastics
2020	(United States) LeBron James (4)	National Basketball Association	(Japan) Naomi Osaka	Tennis
2021	(Japan) Shohei Ohtani	Major League Baseball	(United States) Candace Parker (2)	Women's National Basketball Association
2022	(United States) Aaron Judge	Major League Baseball	(United States) Katie Ledecky (2)	Swimming
2023	(Japan) Shohei Ohtani (2)	Major League Baseball	(United States) Simone Biles (3)	Gymnastics
2024	(Japan) Shohei Ohtani (3)	Major League Baseball	(United States) Caitlin Clark	Women's National Basketball Association
2025	(Japan) Shohei Ohtani (4)	Major League Baseball	(United States) A'ja Wilson	Women's National Basketball Association

== Multiple awards ==
List of male award winners
Name	Sport	Awards	Years
Lance Armstrong	Road bicycle racing	4	2002, 2003, 2004, 2005
Tiger Woods	Golf	4	1997, 1999, 2000, 2006
LeBron James	Basketball	4	2013, 2016, 2018, 2020
Shohei Ohtani	Baseball	4	2021, 2023, 2024, 2025
Michael Jordan	Basketball	3	1991, 1992, 1993
Don Budge	Tennis	2	1937, 1938
Sandy Koufax	Baseball	2	1963, 1965
Carl Lewis	Track and field	2	1983, 1984
Joe Montana	American football	2	1989, 1990
Byron Nelson	Golf	2	1944, 1945
Michael Phelps	Swimming	2	2008, 2012

List of female award winners
Name	Sport	Awards	Years
Babe Didrikson Zaharias	Golf/Track and field	6	1932, 1945, 1946, 1947, 1950, 1954
Serena Williams	Tennis	5	2002, 2009, 2013, 2015, 2018
Chris Evert	Tennis	4	1974, 1975, 1977, 1980
Maureen Connolly	Tennis	3	1951, 1952, 1953
Annika Sörenstam	Golf	3	2003, 2004, 2005
Simone Biles	Gymnastics	3	2016, 2019, 2023
Alice Marble	Tennis	2	1939, 1940
Althea Gibson	Tennis	2	1957, 1958
Wilma Rudolph	Track and field	2	1960, 1961
Mickey Wright	Golf	2	1963, 1964
Kathy Whitworth	Golf	2	1965, 1966
Billie Jean King	Tennis	2	1967, 1973
Tracy Austin	Tennis	2	1979, 1981
Nancy Lopez	Golf	2	1978, 1985
Martina Navratilova	Tennis	2	1983, 1986
Monica Seles	Tennis	2	1991, 1992
Lorena Ochoa	Golf	2	2006, 2007
Candace Parker	Basketball	2	2008, 2021
Katie Ledecky	Swimming	2	2017, 2022

== AP Athlete of the Decade ==
List of award winners
Decade	Male		Female	
Decade	Name	Sport	Name	Sport
1960s	(United States) Arnold Palmer	Golf	None Awarded	
1970s	(United States) Jack Nicklaus	Golf	None Awarded	
1980s	(Canada) Wayne Gretzky	Hockey	None Awarded	
1990s	(United States) Michael Jordan	Basketball	None Awarded	
2000s	(United States) Tiger Woods	Golf	None Awarded	
2010s	(United States) LeBron James	Basketball	(United States) Serena Williams	Tennis

== Notes ==
- Adapted from the article Associated Press Athlete of the Year, from Wikinfo, licensed under the GNU Free Documentation License.
