= Titleholders Championship =

US women's golf tournament, 1937–1972

The Titleholders Championship was a women's golf tournament played from in 1937 to 1966 and again in 1972. It was later designated a major championship by the LPGA Tour.

== History ==
The Titleholders Championship was founded in 1937. Like the Masters Tournament for men, which began a few years earlier, it was played in Augusta, Georgia, but at Augusta Country Club, not at the adjacent Augusta National Golf Club. The winners of various amateur and professional events were invited to take part, although most of the competitors were amateurs. There were very few women professionals at the time and most earned their living as club or teaching professionals.

The Titleholders itself did not offer prize money until 1948, when a prize fund of $600 was introduced, with half of the money going to the professional placing highest in the event. The tournament was discontinued after November 1966, but was revived for one year in 1972, when it was played in May at the Pine Needles Lodge and Golf Club in Southern Pines, North Carolina. All of these stagings are now recognized as major championships by the LPGA, even though the organization was not founded until 1950.

== Winners ==
Year	Winner	Country	Score	Runner(s)-up	Winners' share ($)	Purse ($)	Ref
1972	Sandra Palmer	United States	283	(United States) Judy Rankin, (United States) Mickey Wright	3,000	20,000	
1967–1971: No tournament
1966	Kathy Whitworth	United States	291	(United States) Judy Kimball-Simon, (United States) Mary Mills	1,500	10,000	
1965	Kathy Whitworth	United States	287	(United States) Peggy Wilson	1,500	10,000	
1964	Marilynn Smith	United States	289	(United States) Mickey Wright	1,300	7,500	
1963	Marilynn Smith	United States	292^{PO}	(United States) Mickey Wright	1,235	7,500	
1962	Mickey Wright	United States	295^{PO}	(United States) Ruth Jessen	1,330	7,500	
1961	Mickey Wright	United States	299	(United States) Patty Berg, (United States) Louise Suggs	1,200	7,000	
1960	Fay Crocker	Uruguay	303	(United States) Kathy Cornelius	1,140	6,000	
1959	Louise Suggs	United States	297	(United States) Betsy Rawls	1,000	5,000	
1958	Beverly Hanson	United States	299	(United States) Betty Dodd	1,000	5,275	
1957	Patty Berg	United States	296	(United States) Anne Quast (a)	1,000	5,000	
1956	Louise Suggs	United States	302	(United States) Patty Berg	1,000	5,000	
1955	Patty Berg	United States	291	(United States) Mary Lena Faulk	1,000	5,000	
1954	Louise Suggs	United States	293	(United States) Patty Berg	1,000	3,000	
1953	Patty Berg	United States	294	(United States) Betsy Rawls	1,000	2,200	
1952	Babe Zaharias	United States	299	(United States) Betsy Rawls	1,000	2,100	
1951	Pat O'Sullivan (a)	United States	301	(United States) Beverly Hanson		1,500	
1950	Babe Zaharias	United States	298	(United States) Claire Doran (a)	700	1,500	
1949	Peggy Kirk (a)	United States	299	(United States) Patty Berg, (United States) Dorothy Kirby (a)			
1948	Patty Berg	United States	308	(United States) Peggy Kirk (a), (United States) Babe Zaharias			
1947	Babe Zaharias (a)	United States	304	(United States) Dorothy Kirby (a)	300		
1946	Louise Suggs (a)	United States	314	(United States) Eileen Stulb (a)			
1943–1945: No tournament
1942	Dorothy Kirby (a)	United States	239^	(United States) Eileen Stulb (a)			
1941	Dorothy Kirby (a)	United States	224^	(United States) Helen Sigel			
1940	Helen Hicks (a)	United States	336	(United States) Helen Dettweiler			
1939	Patty Berg (a)	United States	319	(United States) Dorothy Kirby (a)			
1938	Patty Berg (a)	United States	311	(United States) Jane Cothran (a)			
1937	Patty Berg (a)	United States	240^	(United States) Dorothy Kirby (a)			

(a) - denotes amateur
^{PO} - won in playoff
^ - 54 holes

== Multiple winners ==
This table lists the golfers who have won more than one Titleholders Championship.

Deceased golfer †
Grand Slam winners ‡
Deceased Grand Slam winners ∞

Country	Golfer	Total	Years
United States	Patty Berg †	7	1937, 1938, 1939, 1948, 1953, 1955, 1957
United States	Louise Suggs ∞	4	1946, 1954, 1956, 1959
United States	Babe Zaharias †	3	1947, 1950, 1952
United States	Dorothy Kirby †	2	1941, 1942
United States	Mickey Wright ‡	2	1961, 1962
United States	Marilynn Smith †	2	1963, 1964
United States	Kathy Whitworth †	2	1965, 1966

=== Winners by nationality ===
This table lists the total number of titles won by golfers of each nationality as a major.

Nationality	Number of wins
United States	27
Uruguay	1
