= Bea Barrett =

American amateur golfer (1916–2002)

Personal information
- Full name: Beatrice Emma Altmeyer
- Nickname: Bea
- Nationality: United States
- Born: November 15, 1916 Chicago, Illinois, U.S.
- Died: August 26, 2002 (aged 85) St. Louis Park, Minnesota, U.S.

Career
- Sport: Golf

Best results in LPGA major championships (wins: 1)
- Western Open: Won: 1938

Beatrice Emma (Barrett) Altmeyer (November 15, 1916 – August 26, 2002) was an American amateur golfer.

== Career ==
Barrett was born in Chicago, Illinois. In 1938, she won the Women's Western Open, now considered an LPGA major championship. She won ten Minnesota state golf tournaments between 1933 and 1962, competing under both her maiden and married names.

== Personal life ==
She died in St. Louis Park, Minnesota.

== Awards and honors ==
In 1989, Altmeyer was elected to the Minnesota Golf Hall of Fame.

== Tournament wins (11) ==
this list may be incomplete

- 1933 Minnesota Women's State Match Play Championship
- 1937 Minnesota Women's State Match Play Championship
- 1938 Women's Western Open
- 1946 Minnesota Women's State Match Play Championship
- 1947 Minnesota Women's State Match Play Championship, Minnesota Women's State Amateur Championship
- 1950 Minnesota Women's State Amateur Championship
- 1958 Minnesota Women's State Match Play Championship, Minnesota Women's State Amateur Championship
- 1961 Minnesota Women's State Match Play Championship
- 1962 Minnesota Women's State Amateur Championship

== Major championships ==
=== Wins (1) ===
Year	Championship	Winning score	Runner-up
1938	Women's Western Open	6 & 4	(United States) Helen Hofmann

== See also ==
- Chronological list of LPGA major golf champions
- List of golfers with most LPGA major championship wins
