= Mary Agnes Wall =

American golfer

Personal information
- Nationality: United States
- Born: March 18, 1919
- Died: May 25, 1983 (aged 64)

Career
- Sport: Golf
- Status: Amateur

Best results in LPGA major championships
- U.S. Women's Open: T6: 1948

Mary Agnes Wall (March 18, 1919 – May 26, 1983) was an American amateur golfer.

In 1973, Wall was inducted into the Upper Peninsula Sports Hall of Fame because she was "recognized as the greatest woman golfer to come out of the U.P." She won three Michigan championships and was runner-up four times from 1942 through 1954 and competed on the national tour with the USGA Women's amateur program.“

Wall finished tied for 6th at the 1948 U.S. Women's Open.
