= Betty Hicks =

American professional golfer (1920–2011)

Personal information
- Nationality: United States
- Born: November 16, 1920 Long Beach, California, U.S.
- Died: February 20, 2011 (aged 90) Aptos, California, U.S.

Career
- Sport: Golf
- College: Pomona College; Long Beach City College
- Turned professional: 1941
- Former tours: LPGA Tour (joined at founding in 1950)
- Professional wins: 1

Best results in LPGA major championships
- Women's PGA C'ship: 6th: 1955
- U.S. Women's Open: 2nd: 1948, 1954

Elizabeth M. Hicks (November 16, 1920 – February 20, 2011) was an American professional golfer, golf coach and teacher, aviator, and author. She also competed under her married name, Betty Hicks Newell.

Hicks was born in Long Beach, California. As an amateur golfer, she won the 1941 U.S. Women's Amateur and was Associated Press Female Athlete of the Year. She turned professional later that year. She attended Pomona College, graduating in 1947.

Hicks competed on the LPGA Tour, finishing second several times in the 1950s but never winning. She finished second in the U.S. Women's Open in 1948 and 1954 and third in 1957. She won the All American Open, which would later become a LPGA Tour event, in 1944.

Hicks coached the women's golf team at Foothill College in Los Altos Hills, California, where she also coordinated the aviation department.

As an author, Hicks co-authored the book "Golf Manual for Teachers" with Ellen Griffin in 1949. In 1996, she co-authored "Patty Sheehan on Golf" with Patty Sheehan. In 2006, she wrote "My Life: From Fairway to Airway" which chronicles her life in golf and her second career as a pilot.

Hicks is a member of the LPGA Teaching and Club Professional Hall of Fame, the Long Beach Golf Hall of Fame, San Jose Sports Hall of Fame, the Women's Sports Foundation International Hall of Fame, the California Golf Writers Hall of Fame, and the International Forest of Friendship Aviation Hall of Fame. In 1999, she won the Ellen Griffin Rolex award for her efforts in helping the LPGA grow and in teaching the game of golf to women.

Hicks is sometimes confused with contemporary Helen Hicks, who won the U.S. Women's Amateur in 1931.

Hicks died on February 20, 2011, from Alzheimer's disease.
