= Patty Berg =

American professional golfer (1918–2006)

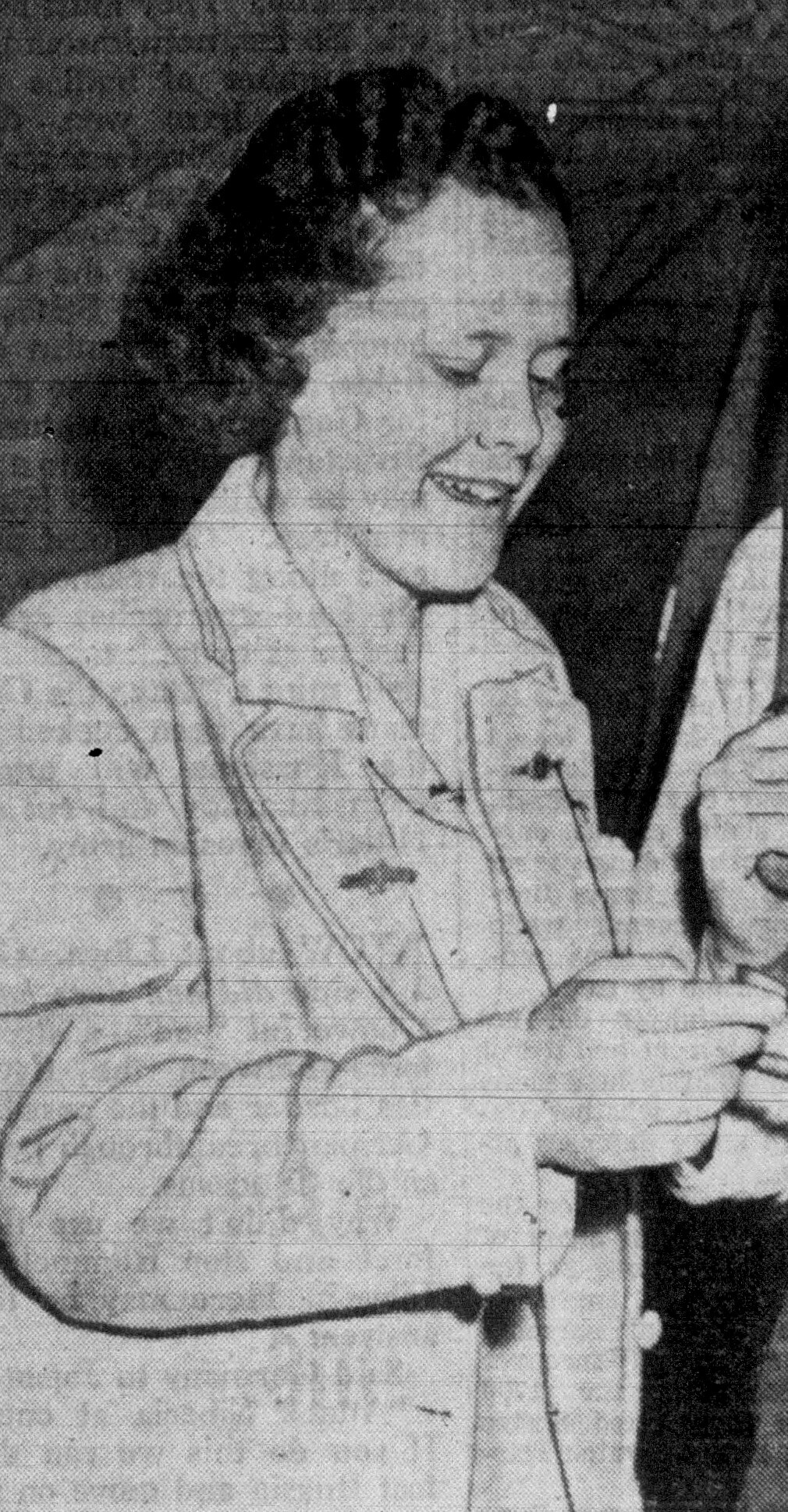
- Berg, circa 1942

Personal information
- Full name: Patricia Jane Berg
- Nationality: United States
- Born: February 13, 1918 Minneapolis, Minnesota, U.S.
- Died: September 10, 2006 (aged 88) Fort Myers, Florida, U.S.

Career
- Sport: Golf
- College: University of Minnesota
- Turned professional: 1940
- Former tour: LPGA Tour
- Professional wins: 63

Number of wins by tour
- LPGA Tour: 60 (4th all time)
- Other: 3

Best results in LPGA major championships (wins: 15)
- Western Open: Won: 1941, 1943, 1948, 1951, 1955, 1957, 1958
- Titleholders C'ship: Won: 1937, 1938, 1939, 1948, 1953, 1955, 1957
- Women's PGA C'ship: 2nd: 1956, 1959
- U.S. Women's Open: Won: 1946

Achievements and awards
- World Golf Hall of Fame: 1951 (member page)
- LPGA Tour Money Winner: 1954, 1955, 1957
- LPGA Vare Trophy: 1953, 1955, 1956
- Associated Press Female Athlete of the Year: 1938, 1943, 1955
- Bob Jones Award: 1963
- Patty Berg Award: 1990

Patricia Jane Berg (February 13, 1918 – September 10, 2006) was an American professional golfer. She was a founding member and the first president of the LPGA. Her 15 major title wins remains the all-time record for most major wins by a female golfer. She is a member of the World Golf Hall of Fame.

In winter times she was also a speed skater.

== Early life ==
In 1918, Berg was born in Minneapolis, Minnesota. She expressed an interest in football at an early age. At one point, she played quarterback on a local team that included future Oklahoma Sooners head football coach Bud Wilkinson. At the age of 13, Berg took up golf in 1931 at the suggestion of her parents; by 1934, she began her amateur career and won the Minneapolis City Championship. The following year, Berg claimed a state amateur title.

== Amateur career ==
Berg attended the University of Minnesota where she was a member of Kappa Kappa Gamma sorority. She came to national attention by reaching the final of the 1935 U.S. Women's Amateur, losing to Glenna Collett-Vare in Vare's final Amateur victory. Berg won the Titleholders in 1937. In 1938, she won the U.S. Women's Amateur at Westmoreland and the Women's Western Amateur. With a victory in the 1938 Titleholders Championship and a spot on the winning Curtis Cup team as well, Berg was selected as the Associated Press Woman Athlete of the Year, the first of three times she earned the honor. In 1939, Berg won her third consecutive Titleholders, although she was unable to compete in the U.S. Women's Amateur due to an operation on her appendix.

== Professional career ==
After winning 29 amateur titles, she turned professional in 1940. Berg's career was interrupted by an automobile accident in December 1941; while traveling to a fund-raising event with Helen Dettweiler, a head-on accident shattered Berg's knee.

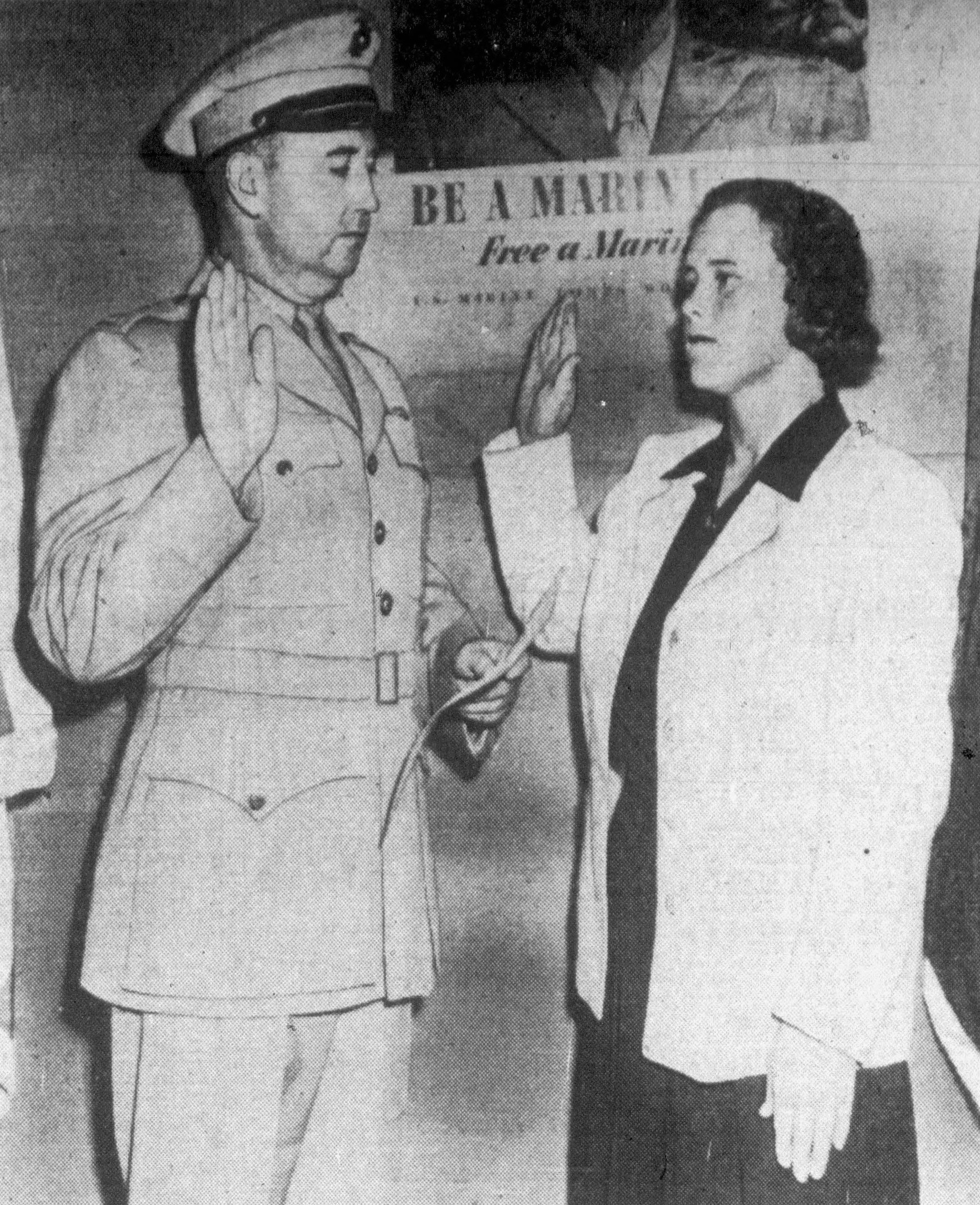
Berg being sworn into the United States Marine Corps Women's Reserve during World War II.

Subsequently, she recovered and volunteered for the United States Marine Corps and was commissioned a second lieutenant in 1942. She served in the Marine Reserves from 1942 to 1945.

Despite concerns that her golfing career would end, Berg returned to the game in 1943, helped by a locker room fall that broke adhesions which had developed in her leg. Upon her comeback, she won the Women's Western Open. She won the inaugural U.S. Women's Open in 1946. In 1948, she helped establish the forerunner of the LPGA, the Women's Professional Golf Association (WPGA), winning three tournaments that season and in 1949. When the LPGA was officially started in 1950, Berg was one of the 13 founding members and held a leadership position as the association's first president. Berg won a total of 57 events on the LPGA and WPGA circuit, and was runner-up in the 1957 U.S. Women's Open at Winged Foot. She was runner-up in the 1956 and 1959 LPGA Championships. In addition, Berg won the 1953, 1957, and 1958 Women's Western Opens, the 1955 and 1957 Titleholders, both considered majors at the time. Her last victory came in 1962. She was voted the Associated Press Woman Athlete of the Year in 1942 and 1955, in addition to her 1938 award. During a four-year stretch from 1953 to 1956, Berg won the Vare Trophy three times for having the lowest scoring average on the LPGA. She was the LPGA Tour's top money winner twice, in 1954 and 1957, and her seven Titleholders wins is an all-time record. Berg won 15 women's major golf championships in her career, including the seven Titleholders victories, seven wins in the Women's Western Open, and the 1946 U.S. Women's Open championship.

In 1959, Berg became the first woman to hit a hole-in-one during a USGA competition, which happened at the U.S. Women's Open.

Berg was sponsored on the LPGA Tour her entire career by public golf patriarch Joe Jemsek, owner of the famous Cog Hill Golf & Country Club in Lemont, Illinois, site of the PGA Tour's Western Open from 1991 to 2006. Berg represented another of Jemsek's public facilities, St. Andrews Golf & Country Club in West Chicago, Illinois, on the women's circuit for over 60 years.

Berg told Chicagoland Golf magazine she taught over 16,000 clinics in her lifetime – many of which were sponsored by Chicago-based Wilson Sporting Goods and were called "The Patty Berg Hit Parade." In that interview, Berg figured she personally indoctrinated to the game of golf over a half-million new players. She was a member of Wilson's Advisory Staff for 66 years, until her death.

== Personal life ==
In December 2004, she announced that she had been diagnosed with Alzheimer's disease. Berg died in Fort Myers, Florida from complications of the disease 21 months later at the age of 88.

== Awards and honors ==
- In 1938, Berg earned the Associated Press Athlete of the Year award in the female category. She also earned honors in 1943 and 1955.
- She was the recipient of the LPGA's Vare Trophy three times: in 1953, 1955, and 1956. The trophy is bestowed to the LPGA golfer with the lowest scoring average.
- In 1963, Berg was voted the recipient of the Bob Jones Award, the highest honor given by the United States Golf Association in recognition of distinguished sportsmanship in golf.
- In 1986, she received the Old Tom Morris Award from the Golf Course Superintendents Association of America, GCSAA's highest honor.
- In 1978, the LPGA established the Patty Berg Award, bestowed to an individual who "exemplifies diplomacy, sportsmanship, goodwill and contributions to the game of golf."
- In her later years, Berg teamed-up with PGA Tour player and fellow Fort Myers, Florida resident Nolan Henke to establish the Nolan Henke/Patty Berg Junior Masters to promote the development of young players.

== Professional wins (63) ==
=== LPGA Tour wins (60) ===
- 1937 (1) **Titleholders Championship** (as an amateur)
- 1938 (1) **Titleholders Championship** (as an amateur)
- 1939 (1) **Titleholders Championship** (as an amateur)
- 1941 (3) **Women's Western Open**, North Carolina Open, New York Invitational
- 1943 (2) **Women's Western Open**, All American Open
- 1945 (1) All American Open
- 1946 (4) Northern California Open, Northern California Medal Tournament, Pebble Beach Open, **U.S. Women's Open**
- 1947 (3) Northern California Open, Pebble Beach Open, Northern California Medal Tournament
- 1948 (3) **Titleholders Championship**, **Women's Western Open**, Hardscrabble Open
- 1949 (3) Tampa Open, Texas PGA Championship, Hardscrabble Open
- 1950 (3) Eastern Open, Sunset Hills Open, Hardscrabble Women's Invitational
- 1951 (5) Sandhills Women's Open, Pebble Beach Weathervane, New York Weathervane, 144 Hole Weathervane, **Women's Western Open**
- 1952 (3) New Orleans Women's Open, Richmond Open, New York Weathervane
- 1953 (7) Jacksonville Open, **Titleholders Championship**, New Orleans Women's Open, Phoenix Weathervane (tied with Louise Suggs), Reno Open, All American Open, World Championship
- 1954 (3) Triangle Round Robin, World Championship, Ardmore Open
- 1955 (6) St. Petersburg Open, **Titleholders Championship**, **Women's Western Open**, All American Open, World Championship, Clock Open
- 1956 (2) Dallas Open, Arkansas Open
- 1957 (5) Havana Open, **Titleholders Championship**, **Women's Western Open**, All American Open, World Championship
- 1958 (2) **Women's Western Open**, American Women's Open
- 1960 (1) American Women's Open
- 1962 (1) Muskogee Civitan Open

LPGA majors are shown in bold.

=== Other wins (3) ===
- 1944 Pro-Lady Victory National (with Johnny Revolta)
- 1950 Orlando Two-Ball (with Earl Stewart)
- 1954 Orlando Two-Ball (with Pete Cooper)

== Major championships ==
=== Wins (15) ===
Year	Championship	Winning score	Margin	Runner(s)-up
1937	Titleholders Championship	+3 (80-87-73=240)	3 strokes	(United States) Dorothy Kirby (a)
1938	Titleholders Championship	−5 (78-79-77-77=311)	14 strokes	(United States) Jane Cothran (a)
1939	Titleholders Championship	+19 (78-78-83-80=319)	2 strokes	(United States) Dorothy Kirby (a)
1941	Women's Western Open	7 & 6		(United States) Mrs. Burt Weil
1943	Women's Western Open	1 up		(United States) Dorothy Kirby (a)
1946	U.S. Women's Open	4 & 3		(United States) Betty Jameson
1948	Titleholders Championship	+8 (80-74-78-76=308)	1 stroke	(United States) Peggy Kirk, (United States) Babe Zaharias
1948	Women's Western Open	37 holes		(United States) Babe Zaharias
1951	Women's Western Open	2 up		(United States) Pat O'Sullivan (a)
1953	Titleholders Championship	+6 (72-74-73-75=294)	9 strokes	(United States) Betsy Rawls
1955	Titleholders Championship	+3 (76-68-74-73=291)	2 strokes	(United States) Mary Lena Faulk
1955	Women's Western Open	E (73-75-71-73=292)	2 strokes	(Uruguay) Fay Crocker, (United States) Louise Suggs
1957	Titleholders Championship	+8 (78-71-78-69=296)	3 strokes	(United States) Anne Quast (a)
1957	Women's Western Open	−1 (72-70-75-74=291)	1 stroke	(United States) Wiffi Smith
1958	Women's Western Open	+1 (75-72-71-75=293)	4 strokes	(United States) Beverly Hanson

=== Results timeline ===
Tournament	1937	1938	1939
Women's Western Open		QF	
Titleholders Championship	1	1	1

Tournament	1940	1941	1942	1943	1944	1945	1946	1947	1948	1949
Women's Western Open		1		1	QF		2	SF	1	SF
Titleholders Championship				NT	NT	NT		4	1	T2
U.S. Women's Open	NYF	NYF	NYF	NYF	NYF	NYF	1	9	T4	T4

Tournament	1950	1951	1952	1953	1954	1955	1956	1957	1958	1959
Women's Western Open	SF	1	QF	2	SF	1	T4	1	1	T2
Titleholders Championship	T11	T3	T3	1	2	1	2	1	3	T8
U.S. Women's Open	5	8	9	3	12	5	T3	2	T9	6
LPGA Championship	NYF	NYF	NYF	NYF	NYF		2	7	12	2

Tournament	1960	1961	1962	1963	1964	1965	1966	1967	1968	1969
Women's Western Open	T13	T15	T3		14	9	WD	T11	NT	NT
Titleholders Championship	T4	T2	4	22	T15	23		NT	NT	NT
U.S. Women's Open	17	18	T13	T29	10	T22	T18	39	T29	CUT
LPGA Championship	4	20	T13		12	T11		T22	T22	T17

Tournament	1970	1971	1972	1973	1974	1975	1976	1977	1978	1979
Titleholders Championship	NT	NT	T36	NT	NT	NT	NT	NT	NT	NT
U.S. Women's Open	31			CUT		CUT	CUT	CUT	CUT	CUT
LPGA Championship	T17		CUT	T51	CUT	CUT	CUT		CUT	

Win
Top 10
Did not play

NYF = tournament not yet founded
NT = no tournament
CUT = missed the half-way cut
R16, QF, SF = round in which player lost in match play
"T" indicates a tie for a place

=== Summary ===
- Starts – 97
- Wins – 15
- 2nd-place finishes – 10
- 3rd-place finishes – 10
- Top 3 finishes – 35
- Top 5 finishes – 47
- Top 10 finishes – 57
- Top 25 finishes – 78
- Missed cuts – 12
- Most consecutive cuts made – 79
- Longest streak of top-10s – 32

== Team appearances ==
Amateur

- Curtis Cup (representing the United States): 1936 (tie, Cup retained), 1938 (winners)

== See also ==
- List of golfers with most LPGA Tour wins
- List of golfers with most LPGA major championship wins
