= Helen Dettweiler =

American professional golfer (1914–1990)

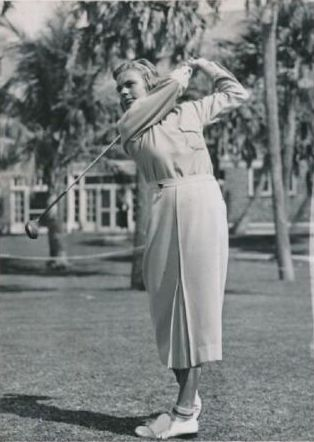
- Dettweiler tees off at Palm Beach in 1937

Personal information
- Full name: Elizabeth Helen Dettweiler
- Nationality: United States
- Born: December 5, 1914 Washington, D.C., U.S.
- Died: November 13, 1990 (aged 75) Palm Springs, California, U.S.

Career
- Sport: Golf
- College: Trinity College
- Turned professional: 1939
- Former tour: LPGA Tour (Founder)

Best results in LPGA major championships (wins: 1)
- Western Open: Won: 1939
- Titleholders C'ship: 2nd: 1940
- U.S. Women's Open: 4th: 1950

Achievements and awards
- World Golf Hall of Fame: 2024 (member page)

Elizabeth Helen Dettweiler (December 5, 1914 – November 13, 1990) was an American professional golfer. She was one of the co-founders of the Ladies Professional Golf Association. She won the Women's Western Open in 1939.

== Early life and amateur career ==
Dettweiler was born to Helen (nee Berens) and William E. Dettweiler, a restaurant and bakery owner, on December 5, 1914, in Washington, D.C. She had two younger brothers, and all three Dettweiler children played sports, with Helen playing tennis, football, baseball, and softball. Her brother Billy, who qualified for the National Amateur Golf Championship at age 14, got her into golf when he bet her that she could not hit a golf ball four consecutive times, and she lost. Within two years of beginning to play golf, she began to win amateur championships. After graduating from Trinity College, Dettweiler began traveling to play in amateur golf tournaments.

Dettweiler became friends with Clark Griffith, the owner of the Washington Senators of Major League Baseball. During a round of golf, she told him of her interest in being a baseball broadcaster, which led Griffith to connect her with Arch McDonald. She toured as a guest announcer in Major League Baseball and Minor League Baseball in 1938, becoming the first female baseball broadcaster.

Dettweiler continued to play golf during the broadcasting tour. She won the District of Columbia, Maryland, and Mid-Atlantic championships.

== Professional career ==
In 1939, Dettweiler turned professional. She won the 1939 Women's Western Open, and finished second in the 1940 Titleholders Championship.

During World War II, Dettweiler joined the United States Army Air Forces' Air Transport Command as a cryptographer. In 1943, she joined the Women Airforce Service Pilots (WASP), and was one of 17 women selected to pilot the Boeing B-17 Flying Fortress, recording 750 flying hours. Dettweiler became Jacqueline Cochran's assistant. After the war, she went with Cochran to Indio, California, to write a book on the history of the WASP. There, she designed a nine-hole course that later became a part of the Indian Palms Country Club. As the golf pro, she instructed Jack Benny, Lucille Ball, Danny Kaye, and others. She also trained Beverly Hanson.

Dettweiler co-founded the Women's Professional Golf Association (WPGA) in the 1940s, and was elected as its second president. After the WPGA folded, she was one of 13 founders of the Ladies Professional Golf Association (LPGA) in 1950. In 1952, she joined the staff of the Thunderbird Country Club. She also taught at a golf course in Neskowin, Oregon, and organized an invitational tournament there.

Dettweiler remained on the LPGA Tour until the 1960s. After her retirement, she opened a clothing store in Palm Springs, California.

== Personal life ==
Dettweiler died from cancer on November 13, 1990, in Palm Springs.

== Awards and honors ==
In 2024, Dettweiler was inducted into the World Golf Hall of Fame.

== Professional wins (1) ==
- 1939 Women's Western Open

== Major championships ==
=== Wins (1) ===
Year	Championship	Winning score	Runner-up	Ref
1939	Women's Western Open	4 & 3	(United States) Bea Barrett (a)	
