= Augusta Country Club =

Country club in Augusta, Georgia, US

- Location within Georgia
- 33°28′55.992″N 82°0′37.476″W

Club information
- Location: Augusta, Georgia, U.S.
- Established: 1899
- Type: Private
- Tota holes: 18
- Tournaments: Titleholders Championship (1937-1942, 1946-1966)
- Website: augustacountryclub.co
- Designed by: Donald Ross; Seth Raynor
- Par: 72
- Length: 6,771 yards (6,191 m)
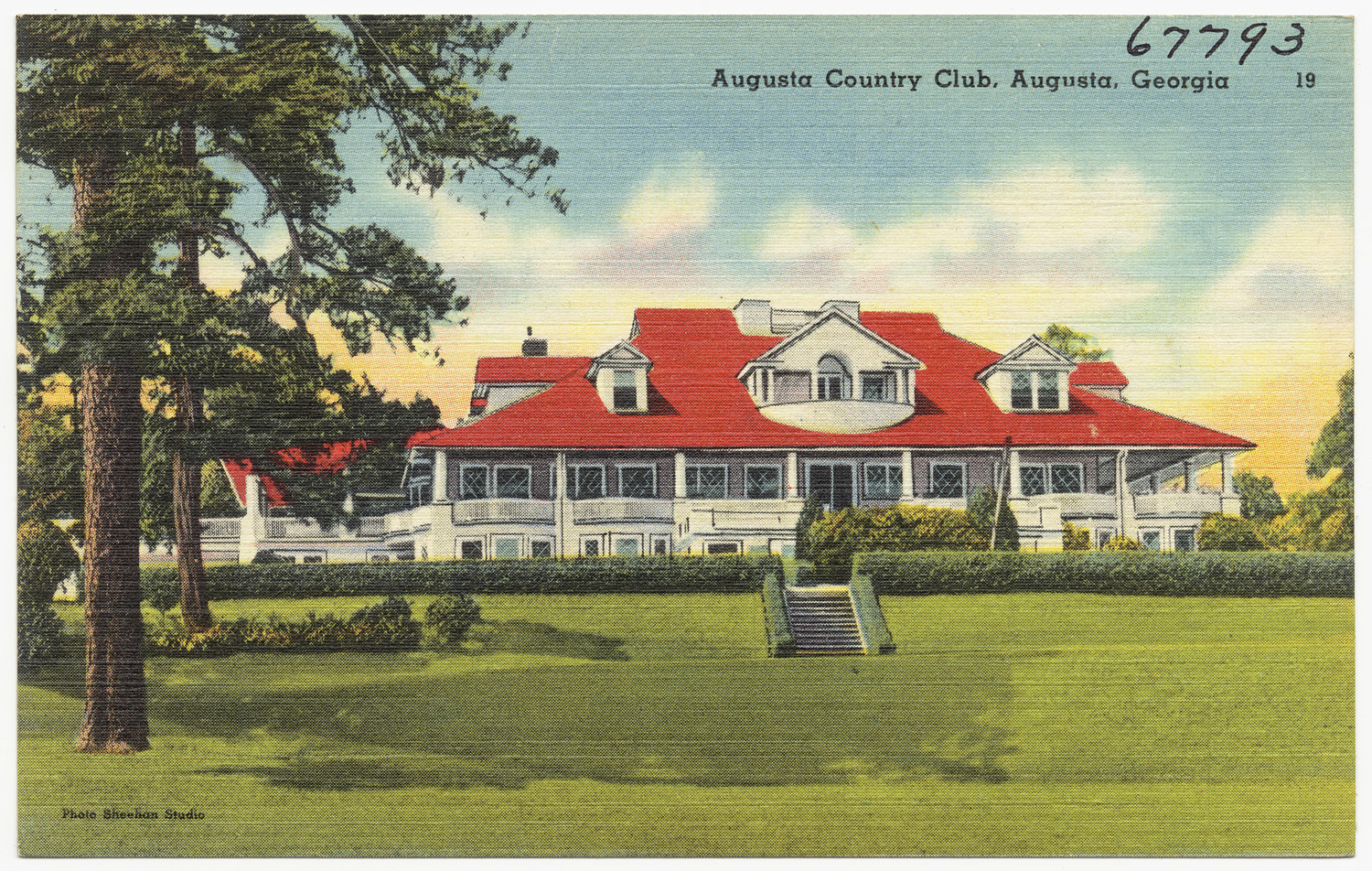
- The clubhouse in the early to mid-20th century

The Augusta Country Club (ACC) is a country club and golf course in Augusta, Georgia. It is located immediately adjacent to the more famous Augusta National Golf Club (ANGC). It also borders on the Sand Hills Historic District, which is listed on the National Register of Historic Places as a historic African-American community.

== History ==
In 1897, the 9-hole golf course known as the Bon Air Golf Club was designed by Donald Ross. In 1901, the course was expanded to 18-holes and then became known as the Augusta Country Club.

In 1930, ACC held their first major national golf championship, the Southeastern Open, where amateur Bobby Jones defeated professional Horton Smith.

In 2001, ACC successfully completed a restoration based on original 1927 Donald Ross sketches from the Tufts Archives in Pinehurst, North Carolina, which is how it remains today.

On August 4, 2017, ANGC bought land from ACC. As part of their deal, ANGC paid to redesign the ACC's 8th and 9th holes.

== See also ==
- Titleholders Championship
