= 1950 LPGA Tour =

Golf tour season

1950 LPGA Tour season
- Duration: January 19, 1950 – October 21, 1950
- Number of official events: 15
- Most wins: 8 (United States) Babe Zaharias
- Money leader: (United States) Babe Zaharias ($14,800)

The 1950 LPGA Tour was the first official season of the LPGA Tour. The season ran from January 19 to October 21. It consisted of 15 official money events. Babe Zaharias won the most tournaments, eight. She also led the money list with earnings of $14,800.

The tournament results are listed below.

== Tournament results ==
The following table shows all the official money events for the 1950 season. "Date" is the ending date of the tournament. The numbers in parentheses after the winners' names are the number of wins they had on the tour up to and including that event. Majors are shown in bold. Note that the LPGA recognizes several pre-1950 tournaments as official wins.

Date	Tournament	Location	Winner	Score	Purse ($)	1st prize ($)
Jan 22	Tampa Open	Florida	(United States) Polly Riley (a) (2*)	295	3,500	
Mar 19	**Titleholders Championship**	Georgia	(United States) **Babe Zaharias (11)**	298	1,500	700
Apr 30	Pebble Beach Weathervane	California	(United States) Babe Zaharias (12)	158	3,000	750
May 7	Chicago Weathervane	Illinois	(United States) Louise Suggs (7)	160	3,000	750
May 14	Cleveland Weathervane	Ohio	(United States) Babe Zaharias (13)	145	3,000	750
May 21	New York Weathervane	New York	(United States) Louise Suggs (8)	155	3,000	750
May 21	144 Hole Weathervane	various	(United States) Babe Zaharias (14)	629	5,000	5,000
May 28	Eastern Open	Massachusetts	(United States) Patty Berg (14)	217	3,000	750
Jun 24	**Women's Western Open**	Colorado	(United States) **Babe Zaharias (15)**	5 & 3	500	
Aug 8	All American Open	Illinois	(United States) Babe Zaharias (16)	296	2,733	900
Aug 13	World Championship	Illinois	(United States) Babe Zaharias (17)	293	4,025	2,000
Sep 23	Sunset Hills Open	Georgia	(United States) Patty Berg (15)	217 (+1)	3,000	750
Oct 1	**U.S. Women's Open**	Kansas	(United States) **Babe Zaharias (18)**	291 (−9)	5,000	1,250
Oct 13	Texas Women's Open	Texas	(United States) Beverly Hanson (a) (1*)	1 up		
Oct 21	Hardscrabble Women's Invitational	Arkansas	(United States) Patty Berg (16)	2 up		

(a) - amateur
* - non-member at time of win
