= 1954 LPGA Tour =

Golf tour season

1954 LPGA Tour season
- Duration: January 15, 1954 – October 31, 1954
- Number of official events: 21
- Most wins: 5 (United States) Louise Suggs, (United States) Babe Zaharias
- Money leader: (United States) Patty Berg
- Vare Trophy: (United States) Babe Zaharias

The 1954 LPGA Tour was the fifth season since the LPGA Tour officially began in 1950. The season ran from January 15 to October 31. The season consisted of 21 official money events. Louise Suggs and Babe Zaharias won the most tournaments, five each. Patty Berg led the money list with earnings of $16,011.

There was only one first-time winner in 1954, Marilynn Smith.

The tournament results and award winners are listed below.

== Tournament results ==
The following table shows all the official money events for the 1954 season. "Date" is the ending date of the tournament. The numbers in parentheses after the winners' names are the number of wins they had on the tour up to and including that event. Majors are shown in bold.

Date	Tournament	Location	Winner	Score	Purse ($)	1st prize ($)
Jan 17	Sea Island Open	Georgia	(United States) Louise Suggs (25)	231	3,500	875
Jan 24	Tampa Women's Open	Florida	(United States) Betsy Rawls (15)	311	5,000	1,200
Feb 14	St. Petersburg Open	Florida	(United States) Beverly Hanson (4)	216	3,500	875
Feb 20	Serbin Open	Florida	(United States) Babe Zaharias (35)	294	5,000	1,200
Mar 7	Sarasota Open	Florida	(United States) Babe Zaharias (36)	223	3,500	875
Mar 14	**Titleholders Championship**	Georgia	(United States) **Louise Suggs (26)**	293	3,000	1,000
Mar 28	Betsy Rawls Open	South Carolina	(United States) Louise Suggs (27)	220	3,500	875
Apr 4	Carrollton Georgia Open	Georgia	(United States) Louise Suggs (28)	218	3,500	875
Apr 11	New Orleans Open	Louisiana	(United States) Marlene Bauer (3)	297	5,000	1,200
Apr 18	Babe Zaharias Open	Texas	(United States) Louise Suggs (29)	224	3,500	700
May 16	Damon Runyon Cancer Fund Tournament	Maryland	(United States) Babe Zaharias (37)	299	5,000	1,000
Jun 5	Triangle Round Robin	Virginia	(United States) Patty Berg (32)	+73	7,000	1,500
Jun 15	**Women's Western Open**	Illinois	(United States) **Betty Jameson (9)**	6 & 5	3,000	1,375
Jul 3	**U.S. Women's Open**	Massachusetts	(United States) **Babe Zaharias (38)**	291	7,500	2,000
Jul 25	Fort Wayne Open	Indiana	(United States) Marilynn Smith (1)	216	3,500	700
Aug 6	All American Open	Illinois	(United States) Babe Zaharias (39)	294		1,000
Aug 13	World Championship	Illinois	(United States) Patty Berg (33)	298	12,000	5,000
Sep 12	St. Louis Open	Missouri	(United States) Betsy Rawls (16)	211	3,500	700
Sep 19	Wichita Open	Kansas	(United States) Beverly Hanson (5)	295	5,000	1,000
Sep 26	Ardmore Open	Oklahoma	(United States) Patty Berg (34)	299	5,000	1,816
Oct 31	Texas Open	Texas	(United States) Betsy Rawls (17)	1 up		700

== Awards ==
Award	Winner	Country
Money winner	Patty Berg	United States
Scoring leader (Vare Trophy)	Babe Zaharias	United States
