= 1950 in sports =

1950 in Sports describes the year's events in world sport. Popular sports during the 1950s were badminton and soccer. Also, 1950 was a huge year for horse racing – horse racing tripled in spectators and prize pools increased.

== American football ==
- NFL Championship: the Cleveland Browns won 30–28 over the Los Angeles Rams at Cleveland Stadium
- Coaches Poll established to rank top 20 American college football teams..

== Association football ==
FIFA World Cup

- 1950 World Cup held in Brazil. Uruguay are the winners after beating Brazil in the final group decider.
- United States defeats England 1–0 in one of the great upsets in sports history

England

- First Division – Portsmouth win the 1949–50 title.
- FA Cup – Arsenal beat Liverpool 2–0.

France

- Olympique Lyonnais, officially rename from Lyon Olympique on August 3.

== Athletics ==
The 4th European Athletics Championships were held from 23 August to 27 August at the Heysel Stadium in Brussels.

== Australian rules football ==
- The Victorian Football Association began playing as an affiliated member of the Australian National Football Council and playing under the same rules as the rest of the country. This ended a decade-long schism which had begun in 1938, during which the VFA had played under its own rival set of rules under which throwing the football in general play was legalised.
- Victorian Football League
  - Essendon wins the 54th VFL Premiership (Essendon 13.14 (92) d North Melbourne 7.12 (54))
  - Brownlow Medal awarded to Allan Ruthven (Fitzroy)

== Baseball ==
- The Japanese Baseball League is reorganized, creating the modern Nippon Professional Baseball.
- World Series – The New York Yankees sweep the Philadelphia Phillies four games to none.
- Japan Series – In the inaugural Japan Series, the Mainichi Orions defeat the Shochiku Robins 4 games to 2.

== Basketball ==
NBA Finals

- Minneapolis Lakers over Syracuse Nationals (4–2)

== Boxing ==
- January – Joey Maxim wins the light-heavyweight world title, stopping champion Freddie Mills in 10 rounds.
- September 27 – Ezzard Charles retains his World Heavyweight Championship with a 15-round unanimous decision over Joe Louis in New York City.

== Canadian football ==
- Grey Cup – Toronto Argonauts win 13–0 over the Winnipeg Blue Bombers

== Cycling ==
- Giro d'Italia – Hugo Koblet of Switzerland
- Tour de France – Ferdinand Kubler of Switzerland
- Vuelta a España – Emilio Rodriguez of Spain
- UCI Road World Championships – Men's road race – Briek Schotte of Belgium

== Figure skating ==
- World Figure Skating Championships –
  - Men's champion: Dick Button, United States
  - Ladies' champion: Aja Zanova, Czechoslovakia
  - Pairs skating champions: Karol Kennedy & Michael Kennedy, United States

== Golf ==
Men's professional

- Masters Tournament – Jimmy Demaret
- U.S. Open – Ben Hogan
- PGA Championship – Chandler Harper
- British Open – Bobby Locke
- PGA Tour money leader – Sam Snead – $35,759

Men's amateur

- British Amateur – Frank Stranahan
- U.S. Amateur – Sam Urzetta

Women's professional

- Thirteen women golfers found the Ladies Professional Golf Association (LPGA).
- Women's Western Open – Babe Zaharias
- U.S. Women's Open – Babe Zaharias
- Titleholders Championship – Babe Zaharias
- Babe Zaharias named Woman Athlete of the Half–Century by the Associated Press.
- LPGA Tour money leader – Babe Zaharias – $14,800

== Harness racing ==
- Little Brown Jug for pacers – Dudley Hanover
- Hambletonian for trotters – Lusty Song
- Australian Inter Dominion Harness Racing Championship for pacers – Captain Sandy

== Horse racing ==
- The United States National Museum of Racing and Hall of Fame is founded in Saratoga Springs, New York.

Steeplechases

- Cheltenham Gold Cup – Cottage Rake for the third successive year
- Grand National – Freebooter

Hurdle races

- Champion Hurdle – Hatton's Grace

Flat races

- Australia – Melbourne Cup won by Comic Court
- Canada – King's Plate won by McGill
- France – Prix de l'Arc de Triomphe won by Tantieme
- Ireland – Irish Derby won by Dark Warrior
- English Triple Crown Races:
  1. 2,000 Guineas Stakes – Palestine
  2. The Derby – Galcador
  3. St. Leger Stakes – Scratch
- United States Triple Crown Races:
  1. Kentucky Derby – Middleground
  2. Preakness Stakes – Hill Prince
  3. Belmont Stakes – Middleground

== Ice hockey ==
- Art Ross Trophy as the NHL's leading scorer during the regular season: Ted Lindsay, Detroit Red Wings
- Hart Memorial Trophy – for the NHL's Most Valuable Player: Charlie Rayner, New York Rangers
- Stanley Cup – Detroit Red Wings win 4 games to 3 over the New York Rangers
- World Hockey Championship
  - Men's champion: Canada's Edmonton Mercurys
- NCAA Men's Ice Hockey Championship – Colorado College Tigers defeat Boston University Terriers 13–4 in Colorado Springs, Colorado
- 1950 imprisonment of Czechoslovak ice hockey players – 11 players of the Czechoslovakia men's national ice hockey team were arrested on false charges

== Nordic skiing ==
FIS Nordic World Ski Championships

- 13th FIS Nordic World Ski Championships 1950 are held in the United States at Lake Placid (ski jumping) and Rumford, Maine (cross-country skiing). These are the first world championships since 1939.

== Rowing ==
The Boat Race

- 1 April — Cambridge wins the 96th Oxford and Cambridge Boat Race

== Rugby league ==
- 1950 Great Britain Lions tour

Australia

- 1950 NSWRFL season

England

- 1949–50 Northern Rugby Football League season/1950–51 Northern Rugby Football League season

== Rugby union ==
Five Nations Championship

- 56th Five Nations Championship series is won by Wales who complete the Grand Slam

== Snooker ==
- World Snooker Championship – Walter Donaldson beats Fred Davis 51–46.

== Speed skating ==
Speed Skating World Championships

- Men's All-round Champion – Hjalmar Andersen (Norway)
- Women's All-round Champion – Maria Isakova (USSR)

== Tennis ==
Australia

- Australian Men's Singles Championship – Frank Sedgman (Australia) defeats Ken McGregor (Australia) 6–3, 6–4, 4–6, 6–1
- Australian Women's Singles Championship – Louise Brough (USA) defeats Doris Hart (USA) 6–4, 3–6, 6–4

England

- Wimbledon Men's Singles Championship – Budge Patty (USA) defeats Frank Sedgman (Australia) 6–1, 8–10, 6–2, 6–3
- Wimbledon Women's Singles Championship – Louise Brough Clapp (USA) defeats Margaret Osborne duPont (USA) 6–1, 3–6, 6–1

France

- French Men's Singles Championship – Budge Patty
- French Women's Singles Championship – Doris Hart

USA

- American Men's Singles Championship – Arthur Larsen
- American Women's Singles Championship – Margaret Osborne duPont

Davis Cup

- 1950 Davis Cup – Australia 4–1 United States at West Side Tennis Club (grass) New York City, United States

== Multi-sport events ==
- 4th British Empire Games held in Auckland, New Zealand
