= 1949 Titleholders Championship =

Golf tournament in Augusta, Georgia, US

The 1949 Titleholders Championship was contested from March 17–20 at Augusta Country Club. It was the 10th edition of the Titleholders Championship.

Peggy Kirk won the tournament with a record low score of 299.

== Final leaderboard ==
Place	Player	Score	To par
1	(United States) Peggy Kirk (a)	76-75-76-72=299	−1
T2	(United States) Patty Berg	77-77-75-72=301	+1
T2	(United States) Dorothy Kirby (a)	76-75-74-76=301	+1
4	(United States) Babe Zaharias	73-81-77-73=304	+4
5	(United States) Dot Kielty (a)	73-79-77-77=306	+6
6	(United States) Louise Suggs	80-72-78-78=308	+8
7	(United States) Estelle Lawson Page (a)	79-77-79-76=311	+11
8	(United States) Marjorie Lindsay (a)	74-81-78-80=313	+13
T9	(United States) Betty Bush (a)	87-77-75-80=319	+19
T9	(United States) Helen Sigel (a)	77-86-74-82=319	+19
