= 1955 U.S. Women's Open =

Coordinates: 37.705°N 97.236°W

Tournament information
- Dates: June 30 – July 2, 1955
- Location: Wichita, Kansas
- Course: Wichita Country Club
- Organized by: USGA
- Tour: LPGA Tour
- Format: Stroke play – 72 holes

Statistics
- Par: 72
- Length: 6,330 yards (5,788 m)
- Prize fund: $7,500
- Winner's share: $2,000

Champion
- (Uruguay) Fay Crocker
- 299 (+11)

Location in the United States
Location in Kansas

The 1955 U.S. Women's Open was the tenth U.S. Women's Open, held from June 30 to July 2 at Wichita Country Club in Wichita, Kansas. It was the third conducted by the United States Golf Association (USGA).

Fay Crocker led wire-to-wire and won the first of her two major championships, four strokes ahead of runners-up Mary Lena Faulk and Louise Suggs. From Uruguay, Crocker was the first international winner of the U.S. Women's Open. She posted a 72 in the second round on Friday in difficult blustery conditions, with winds of 40 mph (64 km/h), and had an eight shot lead after 36 holes. A 79 (+7) in the wind in the third round on Saturday morning reduced it to a single stroke over Faulk, with Suggs another two strokes back.

Defending champion Babe Zaharias did not compete due to back surgery; she also missed the 1953 edition due to colon cancer surgery and died in 1956.

This was the second U.S. Women's Open played in Wichita; the first in 1950 was at Rolling Hills Country Club.

== Final leaderboard ==
Saturday, July 2, 1955

Place	Player	Score	To par	Money ($)
1	(Uruguay) Fay Crocker	74-72-79-74=299	+11	2,000
T2	(United States) Mary Lena Faulk	77-77-72-77=303	+15	1,125
T2	(United States) Louise Suggs	79-77-72-75=303	+15	1,125
4	(United States) Jackie Pung	79-76-76-75=306	+18	750
5	(United States) Patty Berg	78-80-78-71=307	+19	600
T6	(United States) Polly Riley (a)	80-78-74-77=309	+21	0
T6	(United States) Jackie Yates (a)	76-79-76-78=309	+21	0
8	(United States) Pat Lesser (a)	81-76-79-75=311	+23	0
T9	(United States) Beverly Hanson	87-76-77-72=312	+24	450
T9	(United States) Betty Jameson	83-77-76-76=312	+24	450
