= Atlantic City Country Club =

Golf club in Northfield, New Jersey

Coordinates: 39.368°N 74.543°W

- Interactive map of Atlantic City Country Club

Club information
- Location: Northfield, New Jersey, U.S.
- Established: 1897
- Type: Private
- Owner: Ottinger Family Group
- Total holes: 18
- Website: www.accountryclub.com
- Designed by: John Reid (1897); Willie Park, Jnr. (1915); Howard C. Toomey & William S. Flynn (1925); Tom Doak (1999)
- Par: 70
- Length: 6,577 yards (6,014 m)
- Course rating: 72.3
- Slope rating: 133

The Atlantic City Country Club is a golf club located in Northfield, New Jersey, 6 miles (10 km) west of Atlantic City. In addition to a golf course, the club offers banquet and dining facilities. The course resides on 170 acres (0.69 km^{2}) in a coastal setting with skyline views of Atlantic City.

== History ==
The club was established in 1897. It was purchased by Hilton Hotels in 1998. It came under the ownership of Caesars Entertainment Corporation until April 15, 2014, when it was sold to Ottinger family group, the owners of Scotland Run Golf Club and Ballamor Golf Club.

The term "birdie", which means one stroke under par, was coined at the club in 1903.

=== National championships ===
The club has hosted six national championships conducted by the United States Golf Association:

Year	Championship	Winner	Score	Runner(s)-up	Notes
1997	U.S. Women's Mid-Amateur	(United States) Carol Semple Thompson	2 & 1	(United States) Leslie Shannon	
1975	U.S. Women's Open	(United States) Sandra Palmer	+7	(United States) Nancy Lopez (United States) JoAnne Carner (Canada) Sandra Post	
1967	U.S. Senior Women's Amateur	(United States) Marge Mason		(United States) Hulet P. Smith	
1965	U.S. Women's Open	(United States) Carol Mann	+2	(United States) Kathy Cornelius	
1948	U.S. Women's Open	(United States) Babe Zaharias	E	(United States) Betty Hicks	
1901	U.S. Amateur	(United States) Walter Travis	5 & 4	(United States) Walter E. Egan	

- It also hosted an event on the Senior PGA Tour in 1980, the Atlantic City Senior International, won by Don January.
