= Babe Didrikson Zaharias Museum & Visitor Center =

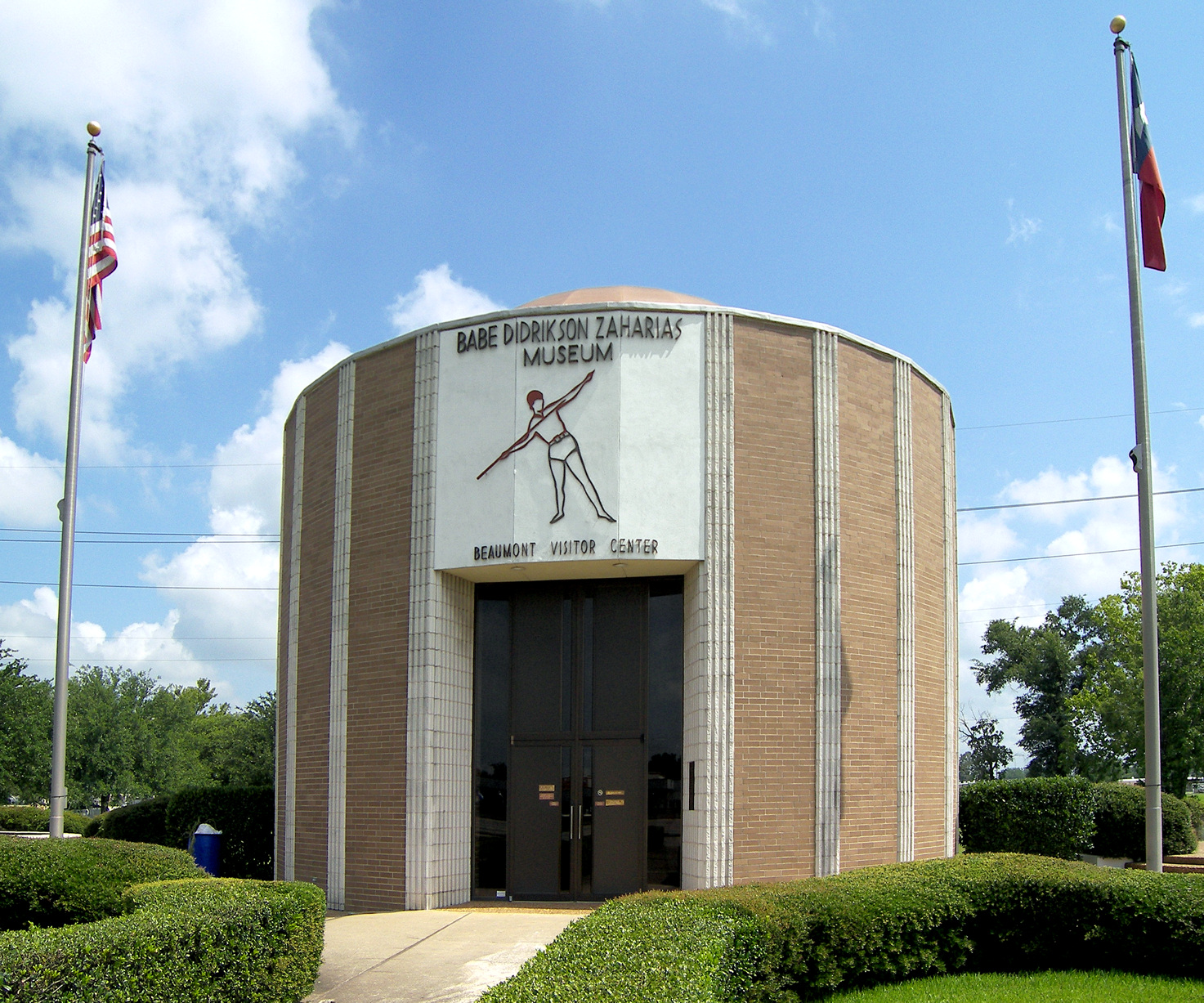
- Exterior of the Babe Didrikson Zaharias Museum & Visitor Center

- Location within Texas
- Location: Beaumont, Texas
- Coordinates: 30.096719°N 94.114125°W
- Type: Sports museum
- Website: www.babedidriksonzaharias.org

The Babe Didrikson Zaharias Museum & Visitor Center is a museum dedicated to Mildred "Babe" Didrikson Zaharias that is located in Beaumont, Texas. Fronting on Interstate 10, it is freely open to the public Monday through Saturday from 9 am to 5 pm. The museum consists largely of trophies and awards that Zaharias accumulated during her career, as well as memorabilia, newspaper clippings, and photographs. The museum also functions as a visitor center for Beaumont. Money raised by the museum helps fund scholarships for female students at Lamar University.

Described by George E. McLeod as "a big trophy case", the museum prominently features a silver cup trophy that Zaharias won at a meet in Chicago in 1932, as well as her three medals from the 1932 Summer Olympics in Los Angeles. The museum also showcases a set of her golf clubs. More of her trophies are on display at the Babe Zaharias Golf Course's clubhouse in Tampa, Florida.

Born in Port Arthur in 1911, Zaharias was perhaps the world's premier female athlete from the 1930s to the 1950s; she won two gold medals and a silver medal at the 1932 Summer Olympics in Los Angeles, and excelled in basketball, golf, and track and field. In basketball, she was a three-time All-American. She also competed in sports as diverse as billiards, bowling, diving, and roller skating.

In 1950, Zaharias helped to found the Ladies Professional Golf Association along with her husband, the wrestler George Zaharias. The couple also founded the Babe Didrikson Zaharias Foundation, which continues to help fund cancer research and support women's athletics as well as the museum. In 1956, Babe Didrikson Zaharias died suddenly of colon cancer at the age of 45; she was buried in Beaumont, which honors her with an annual golf tournament in addition to the museum. The Beaumont Convention & Visitors Bureau has described her as both the "world’s greatest female athlete" and as the region's "hometown legend".
