= 1945 Women's Western Open =

Golf tournament

Coordinates: 39.8477973°N 86.1816482°W

Tournament information
- Dates: June 18–23, 1945
- Location: Indianapolis, Indiana
- Courses: Highland Golf & Country Club
- Format: Stroke play/match play

Statistics
- Par: 76
- Length: 6,591 yards (6,027 m)
- Field: 136 players, 32 to match play
- Cut: 91 (+15)

Champion
- Babe Zaharias
- def. Dorothy Germain, 4 and 2
- Location within the United States Location within Indiana

The 1945 Women's Western Open was a golf competition held at Highland Golf & Country Club in Indianapolis, Indiana from June 18–23. It was the 16th edition of the Women's Western Open.

The field of 136 golfers played an 18-hole qualifying round to determine the 32 players advancing to match play. Babe Zaharias and Louise Suggs shared medalists honors with qualifying rounds of 75 (−1). Match play was over 18 holes for each round except the 36-hole final. After the first round of match play, two professional and fourteen amateur golfers remained in the field.

Babe Zaharias won the championship in match play competition by defeating Dorothy Germain in the final match, 4 and 2. It was a rematch of the 1944 final, also won by Zaharias.

== Final 16 bracket ==
Round of 16; June 20
Babe Zaharias (a)	20h
Jean Hopkins (a)
Dorothy Kirby (a)	7&6
Alice O'Neal (a)
Ann Casey (a)	2&1
Sally Sessions (a)
Marge Becker (a)	4&2
Ann Bruno (a)
Dorothy Germain (a)	6&5
Louise Suggs (a)
Betty Hicks	2&1
Bettye Mims White (a)
Carol Freese (a)	19h
Betty Jameson
Phyllis Otto (a)	2up
Peggy Kirk (a)

Quarterfinals; June 21
Babe Zaharias (a)	4&3
Dorothy Kirby (a)
Ann Casey (a)
Marge Becker (a)	1up
Dorothy Germain (a)	5&3
Betty Hicks
Carol Freese (a)	3&2
Phyllis Otto (a)

Semifinals; June 22
Babe Zaharias (a)	4&2
Marge Becker (a)
Dorothy Germain (a)	3&2
Carol Freese (a)

Finals; June 23
Babe Zaharias (a)	4&2
Dorothy Germain (a)
