= Sunnyside Country Club =

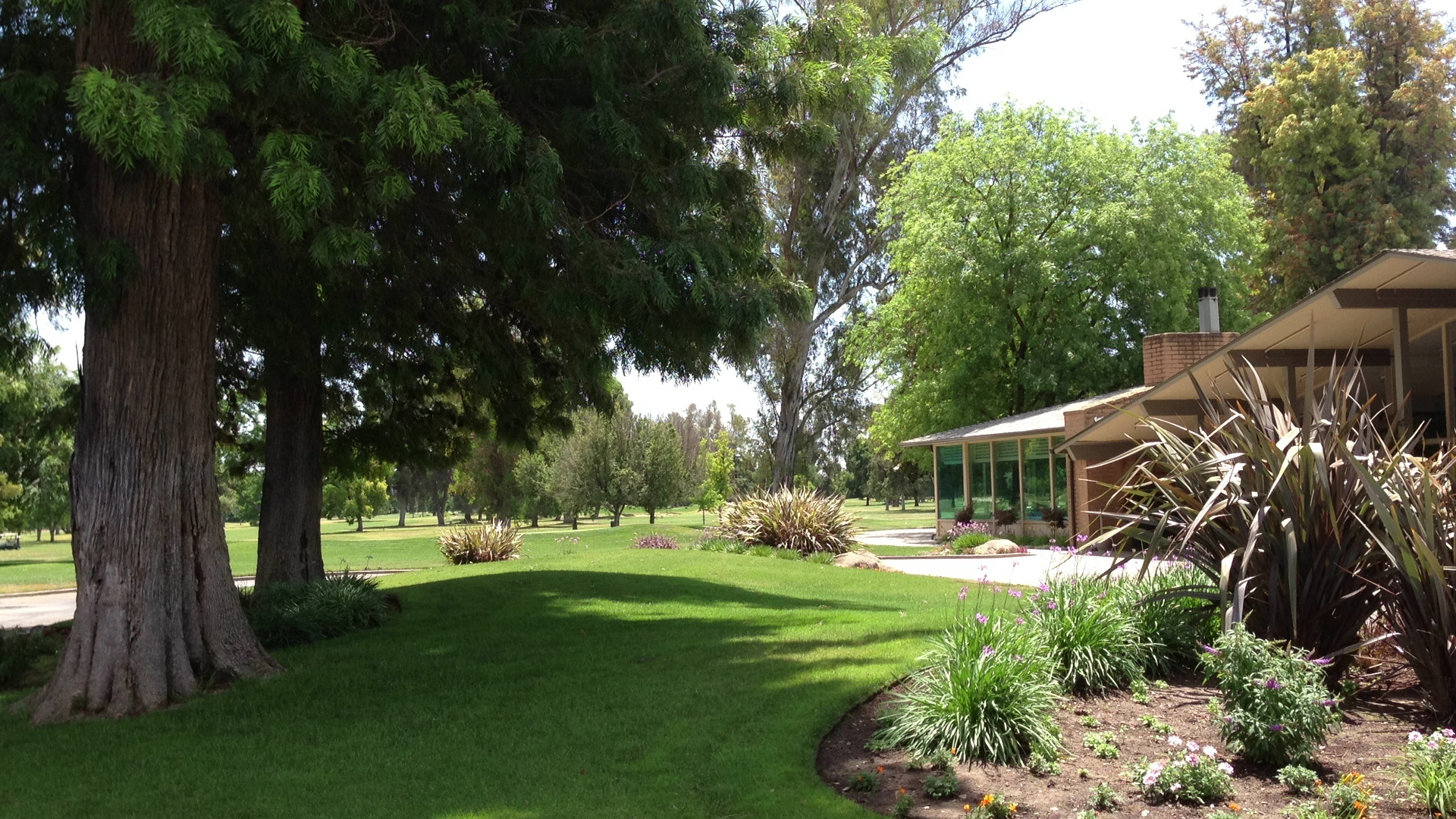
- Clubhouse and 18th green

Club information
- Location: Fresno County, at Fresno, California
- Established: 1906
- Type: Private
- Tota holes: 18
- Tournaments: Fresno Open (LPGA)
- Website: sunnyside-cc.com
- Designed by: William P. Bell
- Par: 72
- Length: 6,950 yards (6,360 m)
- Course rating: 73.5
- Slope rating: 132
- Course record: 63 Nick Watney

The Sunnyside Country Club is a private country club with a championship golf course. It is located in the Sunnyside neighborhood of Fresno, California. Designed by golf course architect William P. Bell and opening in 1911, it is the oldest golf course in Fresno and one of the oldest in California. In addition to the golf course, Sunnyside Country Club has a swimming pool, tennis courts, exercise facilities and a restaurant and bar for its members.

== History ==
Sunnyside County Club traces its origins back to one of the early vineyards of Fresno County. In 1890, the land on which the club currently sits was purchased by William N. Oothout from Frederick Roeding, creating the Sunnyside Vineyard. By 1911, a group of wealthy and well-known Fresnans, including George C. Roeding, C.C. Teague and Frank Romain, bought a portion of the old Sunnyside Vineyard and Oothout’s colonial home to build a golf course for the club. The men hired Bell to design the golf course, which was completed in 1911. Oothout's colonial home was used at the clubhouse, until it was destroyed by fire in 1941.

The existing clubhouse is built in the mid-century modern style an contains a large fireplace sculpture by Fresno artist Stan Bitters. The clubhouse was built in 1948 and was designed by H. Rafael Lake.

The Fresno Open on the LPGA Tour was held at Sunnyside in 1951 and 1952, with Babe Zaharias winning both tournaments. Sunnyside currently hosts numerous NCAA and amateur tournaments.

Throughout its history, many well-known Fresnans have lived on the course itself, including Fresno State Bulldogs Football Coach Jim Sweeney (hole 7) and World War II Flying Ace Pappy Boyington (hole 14).

=== Scorecard ===
Sunnyside Country Club
Tee	Rating/Slope	1	2	3	4	5	6	7	8	9	Out	10	11	12	13	14	15	16	17	18	In	Total
Blue	73.5 /132	415	388	459	195	525	133	445	424	548	3532	341	471	341	159	420	551	346	203	586	3418	6950
White	71.4 /128	407	366	432	177	512	121	385	403	537	3340	325	414	326	150	375	530	320	178	512	3130	6470
Gold	69.8 /126	394	352	407	163	496	108	366	388	493	3167	309	394	319	141	364	490	279	140	493	2929	6096
Par		4	4	4	3	5	3	4	4	5	36	4	4	4	3	4	5	4	3	5	36	72
SI		5	7	1	11	15	17	9	3	13		18	2	6	16	4	8	10	14	12
Women's	75.6 /128	394	352	407	163	496	108	366	388	493	3167	309	394	319	141	364	490	279	140	493	2929	6096
Women's	72 /124	356	303	400	157	452	93	331	348	459	2899	296	371	253	137	334	443	263	128	424	2649	5548
Par		4	4	5	3	5	3	4	4	5	37	4	4	4	3	4	5	4	3	5	36	73
SI		5	11	15	13	1	17	9	3	7		16	2	10	14	8	6	12	18	4
