= 1948 U.S. Women's Open =

Coordinates: 39.370°N 74.542°W

Tournament information
- Dates: August 12–15, 1948
- Location: Northfield, New Jersey
- Course: Atlantic City Country Club
- Organized by: WPGA
- Tour: WPGA
- Format: Stroke play – 72 holes

Statistics
- Par: 75
- Length: 6,326 yards (5,784 m)
- Field: 51 players
- Prize fund: $7,500
- Winner's share: $1,200

Champion
- (United States) Babe Zaharias
- 300 (E)

Location in the United States

The 1948 U.S. Women's Open was the third U.S. Women's Open, held August 12–15 at Atlantic City Country Club in Northfield, New Jersey.

Babe Zaharias won the first of her three U.S. Women's Open titles, eight strokes ahead of runner-up Betty Hicks. It was the fifth of ten major championships for Zaharias.

The U.S. Women's Open returned to the course in 1965 and 1975.

== Final leaderboard ==
Sunday, August 15, 1948

Place	Player	Score	To par	Money ($)
1	(United States) Babe Zaharias	75-72-75-78=300	E	1,200
2	(United States) Betty Hicks	84-75-72-77=308	+8	1,000
3	(United States) Betty Jameson	79-77-78-78=312	+12	825
T4	(United States) Patty Berg	80-78-81-74=313	+13	750
T4	(United States) Grace Lenczyk (a)	79-78-73-83=313	+13	0
T6	(United States) Peggy Kirk (a)	74-80-81-80=315	+15	0
T6	(United States) Mary Agnes Wall (a)	79-78-78-80=315	+15	0
T8	(United States) Beverly Hanson (a)	78-81-82-77=318	+18	0
T8	(United States) Mary Mozell	79-77-83-79=318	+18	700
T10	(United States) Katherine Hemphill	80-73-83-85=321	+21	550
T10	(United States) Sally Sessions	76-81-79-85=321	+21	550
