= Susan Cayleff =

American academic and emeritus professor

- Born: Susan E. Cayleff; 1954 (age 71–72); Boston, Massachusetts
- Occupations: Academic, activist
- Years active: 1973–2020

Susan Cayleff (born 1954) is an American academic and emeritus professor at San Diego State University, having taught there from 1987 to 2020. She was one the inaugural members of the National Women's Studies Association Lesbian Caucus and served on the organization's Coordinating Council between 1977 and 1979. She founded the Women's History Seminar Series at the University of Texas Medical Branch, in Galveston, Texas; the Graduate Women's Scholars of Southern California in 1989; and was a co-founder of the SafeZones program at San Diego State University.

Much of her research focused on women and health. She analyzed both how cultural and traditional beliefs shaped women's quest to find health solutions and the difference between beliefs and how institutional medical policies impacted women. Several of her works examined how alternative medical practices enabled women to become economically, socially, and politically active. Her book Babe: The Life and Legend of Babe Didrikson Zaharias was nominated for both the Pulitzer Prize, a finalist for the Lambda Literary Award, and won the GLAAD Outstanding Book Award in 1996. Her contributions to social equality and inclusion were recognized with the Ashley L. Walker Social Justice Award of the San Diego Human Relations Commission in 2018. The Cayleff and Sakai Faculty Chair of the Pride Center at San Diego State is named in honor of her and Carrie Sakai.

== Early life and education ==
Susan E. Cayleff was born in 1954 in Boston, Massachusetts to Freda "Fritzi" (née Katz) and Nathan Cayleff. She had one sister, Joanie and the family lived in Brockton, Massachusetts, where the sisters' father operated a hardware store. Cayleff stated that though her parents were committed to the Civil Rights Movement and activism against anti-Semitism and for Native American and women's rights, she left home in 1973 because of her parents' homophobia and settled in Provincetown. She completed a Bachelor of Arts degree magna cum laude in women's studies at the University of Massachusetts Amherst in 1976. The following year, while a student at Brooklyn College, she attended the inaugural conference of the National Women's Studies Association, having won a lottery to be a student delegate. She was elected to serve on the Coordinating Council as part of the Lesbian Caucus, along with Tucker Farley, Elisa Buenaventura, and Toni McNaron from 1977 to 1979.

In 1978, Cayleff earned her master's degree in women's history from Sarah Lawrence College. Her master's thesis, The Eradication of Female Midwifery was published in 1978 and explored the history of midwifery within the medical profession. Continuing her education, Cayleff earned a master's degree in American civilization in 1979 and her PhD in 1983 from Brown University. Her doctoral thesis continued with the themes of gender and medicine examining the nineteenth-century hydrotherapy movement and women's involvement in it. It was published as Wash and Be Healed: The Water-Cure Movement and Women's Health in 1987. Her study evaluated women as both users and providers of health therapies and how the traditions regarding their bodies and the environment were perceived and shaped by social norms which defined the doctor-patient relationship. As physicians characterized women as passive, weak, and prone to disease, they asserted authority over their bodies and created strict regimens for women to follow in regulating their menstrual cycles, pregnancies, and childbirth. Scholar Beth A. Robertson noted that Cayleff saw this extreme control and scrutiny as a driving factor in American and Canadian women's search for medical alternatives.

== Career ==
In 1983, Cayleff was hired as an assistant professor of medical humanities at the University of Texas Medical Branch, in Galveston, Texas. She was the founder of the Women's History Seminar Series at the medical branch's obstetrics of gynecology department in 1984. Her course included making medical students aware of the different needs that their Chicana patients might have. She worked in Texas until 1987, when she took a post as an associate professor at San Diego State University, in California. Cayleff founded the Graduate Women's Scholars of Southern California in 1989 to facilitate networking for women scholars. Until 2002, the organization met in her home. In 2007, she co-founded the SafeZones program, a networking and support group for LGBTQIA+ and their allies. In 1993, Cayleff became a professor in San Diego State's women's studies program and was promoted to its chair in 1996. When the Osher Lifelong Learning Institutes was founded to teach students over 50, Cayleff began teaching additional courses in women's history at the facility.

Among her other pursuits, Cayleff served on the executive board of the Lipinsky Institute for Judaic Studies from 1990, and in 1993 became an advisor and mentor to the Hoover High School's Young Women's Studies Club. In 2018, she was honored by the San Diego Human Relations Commission with the Ashley L. Walker Social Justice Award for her social contributions toward equality and inclusion. Cayleff retired in 2020 and that year to recognize the work she and Carrie Sakai had done on inclusiveness, San Diego State created the Cayleff and Sakai Faculty Chair for the university's Pride Center. Upon her retirement, Cayleff and her wife, whom she married in 1992, returned to the Cape Cod area.

== Research ==
Cayleff wrote six books and numerous articles about women's health. Several of these works explored how attending baths, or water cure spas, allowed women to gather and share their health experiences of pregnancy and childbirth, along with other women's health issues and opened opportunities for them to become social reformers. Among the movements Cayleff identified that emerged from the hydrotherapy movement were dress-reform, physical education, temperance, and vegetarianism. Articles like 'Prisoners of Their Own Feebleness': Women, Nerves and Western Medicine continued her earlier work on doctor's perceptions of women's weakness, and explored the ways in which experts evaluated women's sexuality, including linking mental deficiencies with homosexuality. Other works, such as Self-Help and the Patent Medicine Business, analyzed how different ethnic and cultural groups beliefs shaped women's own perceptions of their health and treatment.

Works such as the volume Wings of Gauze: Women of Color Experience Health and Illness, co-edited with Barbara Bair, explored the federal and institutional health policies used to control the health of women of color. The essays chosen from African-, Asian-, Native American and Latina contributors evaluated the intersection of health policy and practices with gender, poverty, and race. Later works, such as Nature's Path: A History of Naturopathic Healing in America (2016) explored how natural health movements expanded into the twentieth century and continued to be transformative for women's socio-political development. It discussed the body autonomy women gained for themselves and their families from associations with natural healers and philosophers, in spite of the cultural reliance on scientific expertise of medical practitioners and pharmaceutical science. The book traced the rise of allopathic and naturopathic theories, looking at the use of patent medicine, social and class differences in available health care, the rise of vaccines, as well as the use of animals for experimentation, combining an overview of history and science as it impacts the search for health solutions.

Cayleff has written two biographies of Babe Didrikson Zaharias. Her second book, Babe: The Life and Legend of Babe Didrikson Zaharias was published in 1995 and explored the relationship of Zaharias and her husband George. The book also examined the relationship of Zaharias and fellow golfer Betty Dodd, contrasting their emotional commitment with her marital bond. Cayleff's biography of Zaharias used a feminist approach to evaluate Babe's own history juxtaposed with the history of women's sport and analyzed the politics that surrounded women's sexuality and work in her era. Babe was nominated for the Pulitzer Prize, was a finalist for the Lambda Literary Award, and won the GLAAD Outstanding Book Award in 1996. She sold the movie rights to a film based on the book, and in 2014 screenwriter Donald Martin was working on the project.

== Selected works ==
- Cayleff, Susan E. (1987). Wash and Be Healed: The Water-Cure Movement and Women's Health. Philadelphia, Pennsylvania: Temple University Press. ISBN 978-0-87722-462-4.
- Cayleff, Susan E. (1988). "4. Gender, Ideology, and the Water-Cure Movement". In Gevitz, Norman (ed.). Other Healers: Unorthodox Medicine in America. Baltimore, Maryland: Johns Hopkins University Press. pp. 82–98. ISBN 978-0-8018-3664-0.
- Cayleff, Susan E. (1988). "'Prisoners of Their Own Feebleness': Women, Nerves and Western Medicine–A Historical Overview". Social Science & Medicine. 26 (12). Oxford, Oxfordshire: Pergamon Press: 1199–1208. doi:10.1016/0277-9536(88)90152-9. ISSN 0277-9536. OCLC 115525713. PMID 3061016.
- Cayleff, Susan E. (1990). "12. Self-Help and the Patent Medicine Business". In Apple, Rima D. (ed.). Women, Health, and Medicine in America: A Historical Handbook. Garland Reference Library of the Social Sciences. Vol. 483. New York, New York: Garland Publishing. pp. 311–336. ISBN 978-0-8240-8447-9.
- Bair, Barbara; Cayleff, Susan E., eds. (1993). Wings of Gauze: Women of Color and the Experience of Health and Illness. Detroit, Michigan: Wayne State University Press. ISBN 978-0-8143-2301-4.
- Cayleff, Susan E. (1995). Babe: The Life and Legend of Babe Didrikson Zaharias. Urbana, Illinois: University of Illinois Press. ISBN 978-0-252-01793-3.
- Cayleff, Susan E. (2008). "Feeding the Hand That Bit You: Lesbian Daughters at Mid-Life Negotiating Parental Caretaking". Journal of Lesbian Studies. 12 (2–3). Philadelphia, Pennsylvania: Taylor & Francis: 237–254. doi:10.1080/10894160802161398. ISSN 1089-4160. OCLC 438776951. PMID 19042735. S2CID 36793021.
- Cayleff, Susan E. (2016). Nature's Path: A History of Naturopathic Healing in America. Baltimore, Maryland: Johns Hopkins University Press. ISBN 978-1-4214-1903-9.
