= 1940 Women's Western Open =

Golf tournament

Coordinates: 43°04′03″N 88°02′27″W

The 1940 Women's Western Open was a golf competition held at Blue Mound Golf & Country Club in Wauwatosa, Wisconsin, near Milwaukee. It was the 11th edition of the Women's Western Open. Babe Zaharias won the championship in match play competition by defeating Lucile Mann in the final match, 5 and 4.
