= 1954 U.S. Women's Open =

Coordinates: 42.531°N 70.963°W

Tournament information
- Dates: July 1–3, 1954
- Location: Peabody, Massachusetts
- Course: Salem Country Club
- Organized by: USGA
- Tour: LPGA Tour
- Format: Stroke play – 72 holes

Statistics
- Par: 72
- Length: 6,393 yards (5,846 m)
- Field: 53: 21 pros, 32 amateurs
- Prize fund: $7,500
- Winner's share: $2,000

Champion
- (United States) Babe Zaharias
- 291 (+3)

Location in the United States
Location in Massachusetts

The 1954 U.S. Women's Open was the ninth U.S. Women's Open, held July 1–3 at Salem Country Club in Peabody, Massachusetts. It was the second conducted by the United States Golf Association (USGA).

Babe Zaharias won her third U.S. Women's Open, twelve strokes ahead of runner-up Betty Hicks, a record victory margin which still stands. It was the last of her ten major championships and her final U.S. Women's Open as a competitor.

Zaharias missed the event in 1953 while recovering from surgery for colon cancer. She did not defend in 1955 due to back surgery, which discovered that cancer had recurred near her sacrum and she died in September 1956 at age 45.

Future four-time champion Mickey Wright, age 19, was the low amateur and tied for fourth place. She was paired with Zaharias on Saturday for the final two rounds and impressed the three-time champion.

== Final leaderboard ==
Saturday, July 3, 1954

Place	Player	Score	To par	Money ($)
1	(United States) Babe Zaharias	72-71-73-75=291	+3	2,000
2	(United States) Betty Hicks	75-76-75-77=303	+15	1,250
3	(United States) Louise Suggs	76-77-78-76=307	+19	1,000
T4	(United States) Betsy Rawls	77-73-78-80=308	+20	750
T4	(United States) Mickey Wright (a)	74-79-79-76=308	+20	0
6	(United States) Jackie Pung	81-77-78-73=309	+21	600
T7	(United States) Beverly Hanson	77-80-78-75=310	+22	500
T7	(United States) Pat Lesser (a)	79-73-78-80=310	+22	0
T9	(Uruguay) Fay Crocker	77-82-79-73=311	+23	400
T9	(United States) Claire Doran (a)	72-79-80-80=311	+23	0
