= Chirapat Jao-Javanil =

Thai professional golfer (born 1993)

Personal information
- Full name: Chirapat Jao-Javanil
- Nickname: Ja
- Nationality: Thailand
- Born: 14 February 1993 (age 33) Bangkok, Thailand
- Height: 5 ft 4 in (1.63 m)
- Spouse: Nat Bhanthumachinda

Career
- Sport: Golf
- College: University of Oklahoma
- Turned professional: 2014
- Current tours: Thai LPGA Tour; Taiwan LPGA Tour
- Former tour: Symetra Tour
- Professional wins: 5

Chirapat "Ja" Jao-Javanil (born 14 February 1993) is a Thai professional golfer who plays on the Symetra Tour, Thailand LPGA Tour, and LPGA Tour. On 25 May 2012, she became the first women's golfer in University of Oklahoma history to win the NCAA Golf Championship as an individual. She turned professional in May 2014 at age 21.

== Family and education ==
Chirapat is the only daughter of Chiravid and Chanasthorn Jao-Javanil. She graduated high school from Somtawin Witead Suksa Huaymongkhon School. In May 2014, she received a bachelor's degree in Psychology from the University of Oklahoma. In December 2015, she married Nat Bhanthumachinda in Bangkok, Thailand.

== Amateur career ==
Chirapat became the first women's golfer in school history to win the NCAA title, shooting a 282 (−6) at the NCAA Championships. She also became the first Oklahoma golfer to win three tournament titles in a single season (NCAA Championships, Central District Invitational, Golfweek Conference Challenge). She has earned two first-team All-American honors, one honorable mention All-American honor, and four All-Big 12 honors. She ranks first in school history with 73.07 career scoring average (+1.42 versus par) and recorded four of the six best single-season averages in OU history. She has won an OU-record six tournaments, including the 2012 NCAA individual title and the 2014 Big 12 Championship. She competed in all 44 team events during her career and finished in the top five in 32% of her career collegiate events (in top 10 in 50%).

At the end of her junior season, she was ranked No. 6 nationally by Golfstat and No. 7 by Golfweek. She also won the Susie Maxwell Berning Classic by two strokes in October with school-record-tying −7 performance (209), and won the SunTrust Gator Invitational by five shots in March with school-record 206 (−4). She finished in second place at Clover Cup in March (4-under 212) and the SMU/Dallas Athletic Club Invitational (1-over 217). Other notable finishes included a tie for third at the Florida State Match-Up Invitational (even-par 216), a tie for fifth at the season-opening Golfweek Conference Challenge (1-under 215), a tie for sixth out of 126 competitors at NCAA Central Regional in Norman with three-round 211 (−5), and a team leading tie for 17th place at NCAA Championships with four-round total of 293.

Junior Accomplishments: She had the overall low gross of the TrueVisions International Junior Golf Championships in 2009 and 2010 in Thailand. She also won the team portion of the 2010 Enjoy Jakarta World Junior Golf Championship in Indonesia. In 2009, she finished seventh in the Callaway Junior World Golf Championship in 2009 and was named to the Senior National Team of Thailand. In 2008, she won the DRB-Hicom ASEAN Junior Golf Championship in Malaysia.

=== Amateur highlights ===
- 2008 DRB-Hicom ASEAN Junior Golf Champion
- 2009 Member of the Senior National Team of Thailand
- 2009 TrueVisions International Junior Golf Champion
- 2010 TrueVisions International Junior Golf Champion
- 2010 Enjoy Jakarta World Junior Golf Team Champion
- 2012 TrueVisions Player of the Year
- 2012 U.S. Women's Amateur Public Links Quarterfinals
- 2012 U.S. Women's Amateur Round of 64
- 2013 U.S. Women's Amateur Public Links Round of 16
- Two-time first-team Golfweek/NGCA All-American Honoree
- WGCA Honorable Mention All-American Honoree
- Four-time All-Big 12 Conference Honoree

=== Professional highlights ===
- 2015 Final Stage LPGA Q School
- 2016 LPGA Yokohama Classic Monday qualifier

== Professional career ==
=== 2014 ===
Jao-Javanil announced that she had turned professional in May 2014. She signed a sponsorship deal with the Singha Corporation.

In only her second professional event, Chirapat claimed the 2014 Golf Capital of Tennessee Women's Open title following her exceptional performance at Stonehenge Golf Club. Only her first time to play in the Tennessee Women's Open, Jao-Javanil navigated Stonehenge like a seasoned veteran, posting 73-70-71, overall 2-under-par 214—the only player to post a sub-par 54-hole total.

Chirapat made it past first and second stage of LPGA Qualifying school. During the final stage of LPGA qualifying school, she did not earn her LPGA Tour card. With her finish, she earned a full exempt status of the Symetra Tour for 2015.

=== 2015 ===
In the summer of 2015, Jao-Javanil finished runner-up at the Texas Women's Open. She captured the low professional award with a two-round score of 74-70=144, 2-over-par. Jao-Javanil sustained an injury during the middle of the year that resulted in some time off for rehab and recovery.

=== 2016 ===
In the beginning of 2016, Jao-Javanil finished tied for 15th at the first Thai LPGA Tour event of the year. After flying back to the US, she has competed in one Cactus Tour event and finished tied for 2nd with a three-round score of 77-72-70, 3-over par. In early May, Jao-Javanil qualified for the LPGA Yokohama Classic in Prattville, Alabama with a score of 70 (−2). This marks the LPGA event that she has played in for her career. Shortly after this event, on May 11, 2016, she took home the title at the Cactus Tour Las Colinas Event in Arizona. Her three-day total for the event was −17 under par (69-66-64) and the final round 64 marks her career low. On May 25, 2016, she won her second consecutive Cactus Tour event at Lookout Mountain Golf Club with a three-day total of -6 under par (72-68-70). Her most recent victory came at the Cactus Tour event at Walnut Creek CC where she shot 71-72-67 = 210 (-6 under par).

=== 2017 ===
In her season opener, Jao-Javanil finished tied for 12th at the Symetra Tour's Florida's Natural Charity Classic shooting -3 under (69-74-70). In July 2017, she claimed her fifth professional win at the 2017 Texas Women's Open in Dallas, TX. She finished the tournament at -5 under (70-71-67) with a one shot victory over defending champion Savannah Vilaubi. The first six holes of her final round included at eagle and 4 birdies.

== College wins (6) ==
No.	Date	Tournament	Winning score	To par	Margin of victory	Runner-up
1	21 Sep 2011	Golfweek Conference Challenge	70-75-72=217	+1	3 strokes	(United States) Grace Na
2	21 Feb 2012	Central District Invitational	68-70-74=212	−4	2 strokes	(United States) Tessa Teachman
3	25 May 2012	NCAA Division I Championship	69-73-70-70=282	−6	4 strokes	(United States) Brooke Pancake
4	17 Oct 2012	Susie Maxwell Berning Classic	70-71-68=209	−7	2 strokes	(United States) Lindsey Weaver
5	17 Mar 2013	Suntrust Gator Invitational	69-68-69=206	−4	5 strokes	(United States) Portland Rosen
6	27 Apr 2014	Big XII Championship	69-72-68=209	−7	2 strokes	(Thailand) Yupaporn Kawinpakorn

== Professional wins (5) ==
No.	Date	Tournament	Winning score	To par	Margin of victory	Runner-up	Winner's share (US$)
1	2 Aug 2014	Tennessee Women's Open	73-70-71=214	−2	5 strokes	(United States) Ashli Bunch	5,000
2	11 May 2016	Cactus Tour Las Colinas	69-66-64=199	−17	6 strokes	(United States) Mikado Nagatori	3,000
3	25 May 2016	Cactus Tour Lookout Mountain	72-68-70=210	−6	1 stroke	(United States) Jennifer Hahn	2,800
4	2 July 2016	Cactus Tour Walnut Creek CC	71-72-67=210	−6	1 stroke	(United States) Jennifer Park	2,700
5	14 July 2017	Texas Women's Open	70-71-67=208	−5	1 stroke	(United States) Savannah Vilaubi	5,000
