= 1944 Women's Western Open =

Golf tournament

Coordinates: 42.0196°N 87.8309°W

Tournament information
- Dates: June 19–24, 1944
- Location: Park Ridge, Illinois
- Course: Park Ridge Country Club
- Format: Stroke play/match play

Statistics
- Par: 75
- Field: 100 players, 32 to match play
- Cut: 91 (+16)

Champion
- Babe Zaharias
- def. Dorothy Germain, 7 and 5
- Location within the United States Location within Illinois

The 1944 Women's Western Open was a golf competition held at Park Ridge Country Club in Park Ridge, Illinois from June 19–24. It was the 15th edition of the Women's Western Open.

The field of 100 golfers played an 18-hole qualifying round to determine the 32 players advancing to match play. Babe Zaharias earned medalist honors with a qualifying round of 77 (+2). Match play was over 18 holes for each round except the 36-hole final. After the first round of match play, one professional and fifteen amateur golfers remained in the field.

Babe Zaharias won the championship in match play competition by defeating Dorothy Germain in the final match, 7 and 5.

== Final 16 bracket ==
Round of 16; June 21
Babe Zaharias (a)	5&4
Ann Casey (a)
Marge Becker (a)	19h
Claire Doran (a)
Patty Berg	4&3
Lois Penn (a)
Betty Jane Haemerle (a)	2&1
Dorothy Kirby (a)
Dorothy Germain (a)	2up
Joanne Barr Tracy (a)
Georgia Tainter (a)	3&2
Jane Weiller Selz (a)
Phyllis Otto (a)	6&5
Virginia Nilles (a)
Jeanne Cline (a)	4&2
Margaret Gunther (a)

Quarterfinals; June 22
Babe Zaharias (a)	3&2
Marge Becker (a)
Patty Berg
Betty Jane Haemerle (a)	19h
Dorothy Germain (a)	4&3
Georgia Tainter (a)
Phyllis Otto (a)
Jeanne Cline (a)	3&2

Semifinals; June 23
Babe Zaharias (a)	2&1
Betty Jane Haemerle (a)
Dorothy Germain (a)	4&3
Jeanne Cline (a)

Finals; June 24
Babe Zaharias (a)	7&5
Dorothy Germain (a)
