= Fresno Open (LPGA Tour) =

Golf tournament formerly on the LPGA Tour

The Fresno Open was a golf tournament on the LPGA Tour from 1951 to 1952. It was played at Sunnyside Country Club in Sunnyside, California, a Fresno suburb.

== Winners ==
Fresno Open

- 1952 Babe Zaharias

Valley Open

- 1951 Babe Zaharias
