= Damon Runyon Cancer Fund Tournament =

Golf tournament formerly on the LPGA Tour

The Damon Runyon Cancer Fund Tournament was a golf tournament on the LPGA Tour, played only in 1954. It was played at Prince George's Golf Course in Landover, Maryland. Babe Zaharias won the event.
