= Florida Heritage Trails =

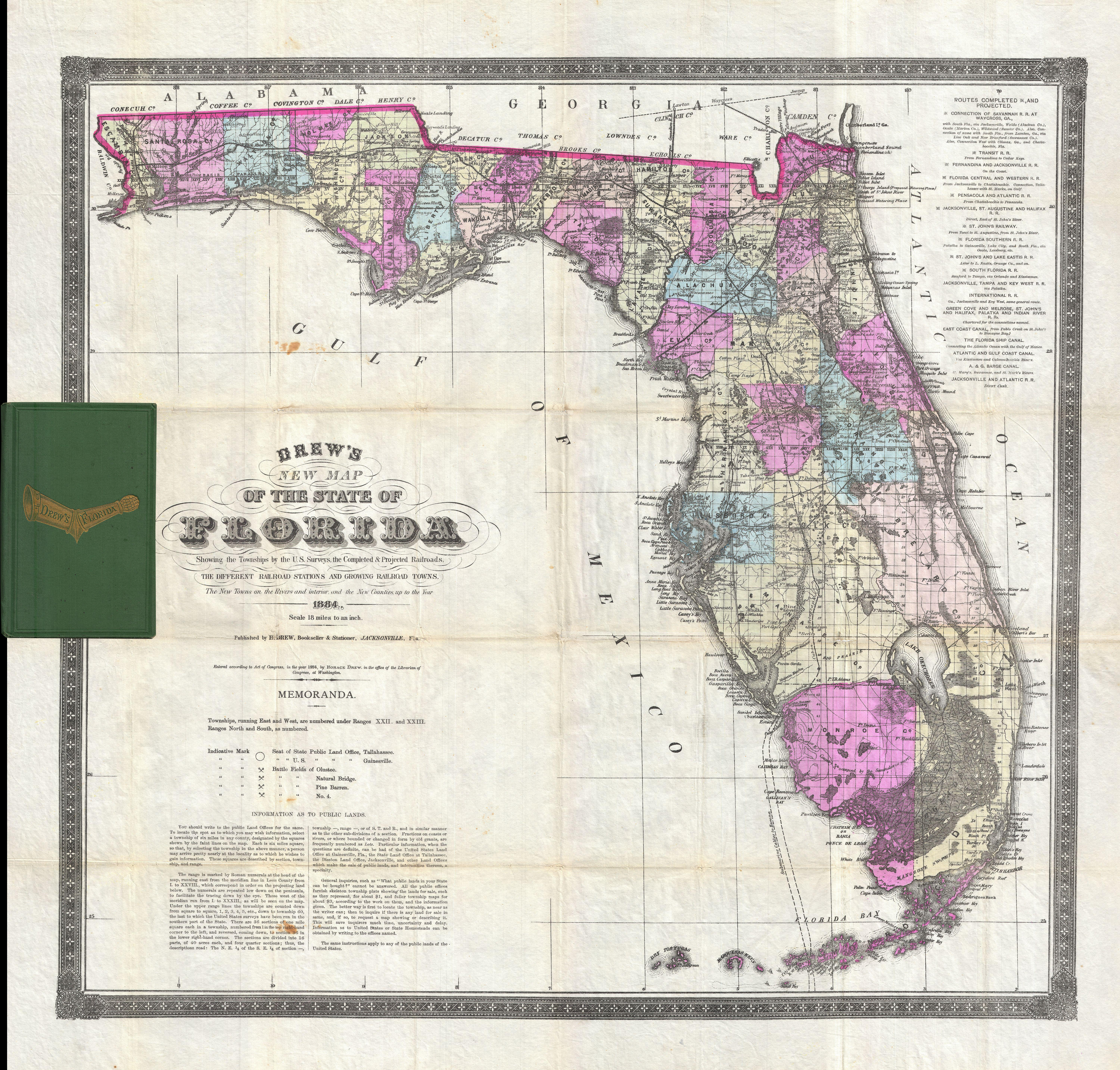
1884 Drew Pocket Map of Florida

Florida Heritage Trails is a series of guidebooks available in digital format and as booklets published by the Florida Department of State, Division of Historical Resources. Each guide highlights historical and cultural locations related to a specific time period or group of people, with an emphasis on communities, buildings, museums, archaeology, arts, and festivals. The guides are geared toward tourists, residents, students and scholarly researchers, and all are accessible at no charge via the Florida Department of State web page.

== History of the guides ==
In the hope of creating new and innovative ways of teaching people about the state's African American cultural heritage, the Study Commission on African American History was formed by the Florida legislature in 1990. Tasked with identifying buildings and other sites connected to the narrative of the black people in Florida with the express desire to turn such locations into tourist sites, the Commission published the Florida Black Heritage Trail, the first in the series, in 1991. That edition became the model for the guides that followed, and has undergone two revisions since.

== Florida Heritage Trails Publications ==
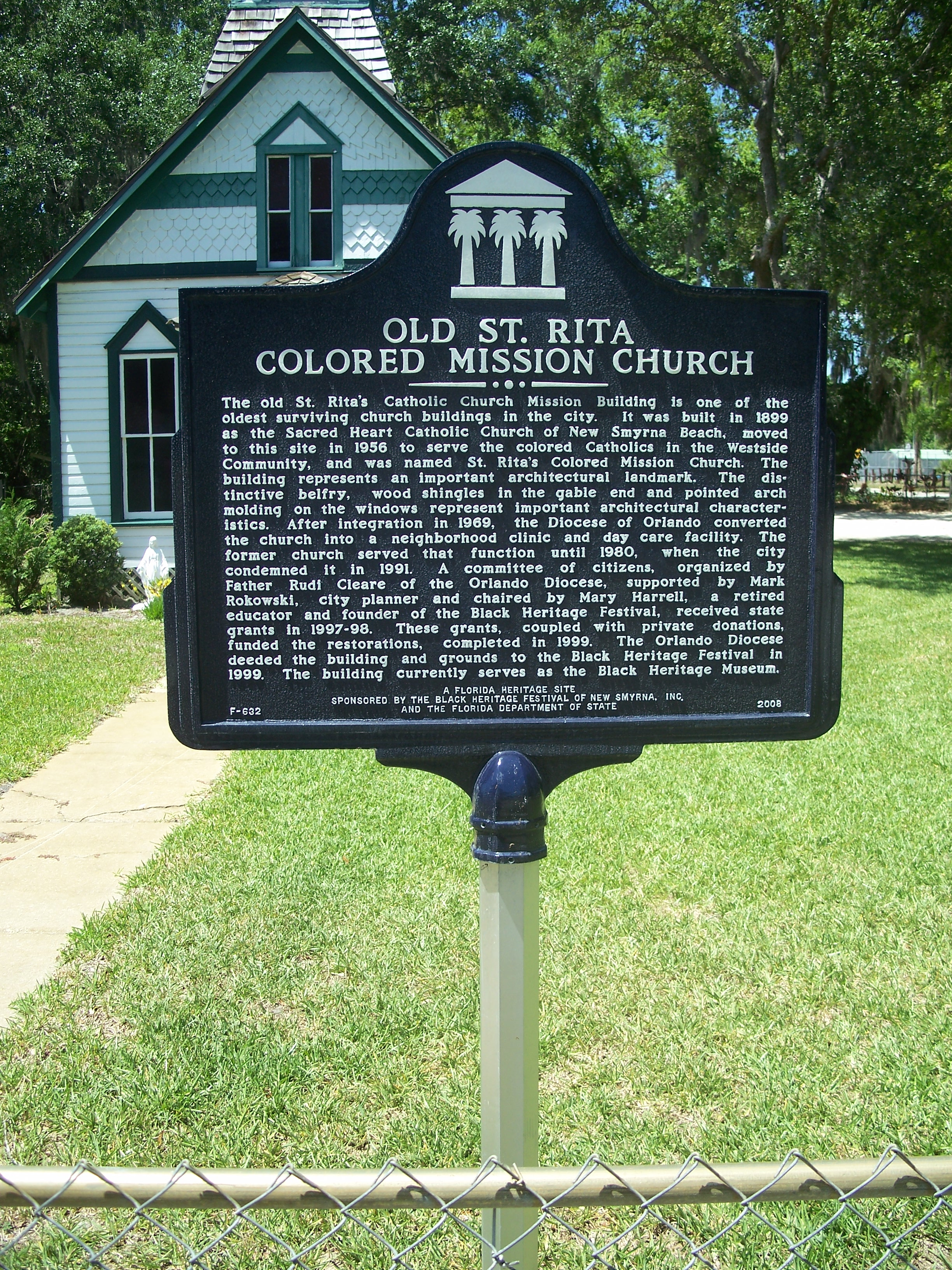
Historical marker at the Old St. Rita Colored Mission Church in New Smyrna Beach

- Florida Black Heritage Trail—Covers significant African-American sites from Pensacola to Key West, and also includes profiles and biographical sketches of numerous eminent and gifted African-American Floridians.
- British Heritage Trail—Essays on the British presence in Florida, and information on over 80 related historic sites throughout the state with direct links to Florida's British history from 1763 to the 20th century.
- Civil War Heritage Trail—A comprehensive history of the Civil War in Florida, including a timeline of events, and a selected bibliography. There is also information on museum exhibits, 200 battlefields, fortifications, buildings, cemeteries, monuments, historical markers and other sites in Florida that are linked to the Civil War period.
- Cuban Heritage Trail—Descriptions of more than 100 places vital to the connection between Cuba and Florida, summaries of numerous famous Cuban Americans, and a colorful guide to Cuban festivals throughout the state.
- French Heritage Trail—Written in both English and French, the guide covers history beginning in 1562 with the French explorers first visits to the state, and continues through maritime rivalries, wars, and revolutions, culminating in the 21st century. Sites and festivals are noted on a county designated state map.
- Jewish Heritage Trail—Traces the Jewish contribution to the State beginning in 1763, and continuing through today. Emigration, achievements and successes are noted alongside periods of discrimination and prejudice against the community. Museums, historic landmarks, and longstanding synagogues are noted along the way.
- Native American Heritage Trail—More than 100 sites of significance are described in prose and pictures spanning 12,000-plus years of Native American presence and importance in Florida. Special interest topics, and biographies of individuals who played a central role in Florida's Native American heritage, are covered in detail.
- Spanish Colonial Heritage Trail—Beginning in 1583, the history covered in this guide traces the vital highlights from the periods of exploration, permanent settlement, and Colonial rivalries. More than 50 Spanish heritage and historical sites throughout the State, are reviewed.
- Women's Heritage Trail—Succinct outlines of over 100 women who played pivotal roles in Florida's history. In each case, a historic site or marker exists to exemplify their contributions to the state.
- World War II Heritage Trail—Museums, street corners, monuments, and military installations are all featured in the guide, alongside color photographs from the time period, and biographical sketches of Floridians who played a significant role during the war years.

== Additional heritage trails ==
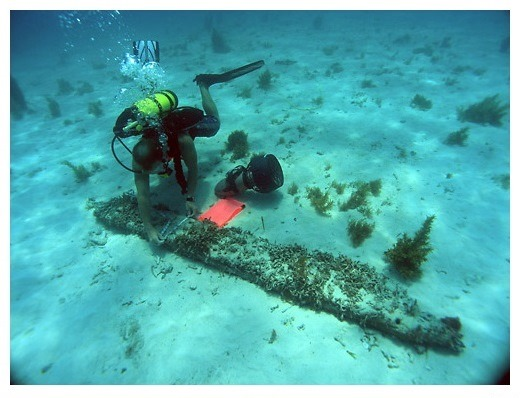
Capitana (El Rubi) Shipwreck Site

There are four heritage trails that do not have individual guide books; however each one has a web page outlining a series of corresponding important sites, along with other background and historical data.

- 1733 Spanish Galleon Trail
- Florida Panhandle Shipwreck Trail
- Florida Historic Golf Trail
- Florida's Underwater Preserves
