= 1953 U.S. Women's Open =

Coordinates: 43.123°N 77.537°W

Tournament information
- Dates: June 25–28, 1953
- Location: Rochester, New York
- Course: Country Club of Rochester
- Organized by: USGA
- Tour: LPGA Tour
- Format: Stroke play – 72 holes

Statistics
- Par: 74
- Length: 6,417 yards (5,868 m)
- Field: 37: 17 pros, 20 amateurs
- Prize fund: $7,500
- Winner's share: $2,000

Champion
- (United States) Betsy Rawls
- 302 (+6), playoff

Location in the United States
Location in New York

The 1953 U.S. Women's Open was the eighth U.S. Women's Open, held June 25–28 at the Country Club of Rochester in Rochester, New York. It was the first U.S. Women's Open conducted by the United States Golf Association (USGA), and the final two rounds were played on Saturday.

Betsy Rawls won an 18-hole playoff on Sunday by six strokes over runner-up Jackie Pung, 71 to 77. It was the third of eight major championships for Rawls and the second of four U.S. Women's Opens.

Patty Berg set a course record with a 71 on Thursday and was the 36-hole leader on Friday evening, eight strokes ahead of the field. Her final two rounds of 80 and 79 on Saturday dropped her to solo third, one stroke out of the playoff.

Notably absent was two-time champion Babe Zaharias, who was recovering from colon cancer surgery. She returned in 1954 and won by a record twelve strokes in her final U.S. Women's Open.

== Final leaderboard ==
Saturday, June 27, 1953

Place	Player	Score	To par	Money ($)
T1	(United States) Betsy Rawls	75-78-74-75=302	+6	Playoff
T1	(United States) Jackie Pung	80-72-76-74=302	+6	Playoff
3	(United States) Patty Berg	71-73-80-79=303	+7	1,000
4	(United States) Betty Jameson	79-76-77-80=312	+16	750
5	(United States) Marilynn Smith	78-74-82-79=313	+17	600
T6	(United States) Betty Bush	80-78-76-81=315	+19	450
T6	(United States) Beverly Hanson	79-80-77-79=315	+19	450
T6	(United States) Pat Lesser (a)	82-75-78-80=315	+19	0
9	(United States) Alice Bauer	83-79-78-76=316	+20	300
10	(United States) Louise Suggs	75-81-79-82=317	+21	250

=== Playoff ===
Sunday, June 28, 1953

Place	Player	Score	To par	Money ($)
1	(United States) Betsy Rawls	71	−3	2,000
2	(United States) Jackie Pung	77	+3	1,250
