= 1950 Titleholders Championship =

Golf tournament in Augusta, Georgia, US

The 1950 Titleholders Championship was contested from March 16–19 at Augusta Country Club. It was the 11th edition of the Titleholders Championship.

Babe Zaharias won her second Titleholders. Her score of 298 broke the scoring record by one stroke, set by Peggy Kirk in 1949.

== Final leaderboard ==
Place	Player	Score	To par	Money ($)
1	(United States) Babe Zaharias	72-78-73-75=298	+10	700
2	(United States) Claire Doran (a)	75-80-74-77=306	+18	0
T3	(United States) Carol Diringer (a)	78-79-76-78=311	+23	0
T3	(United States) Louise Suggs	79-78-75-79=311	+23	450
5	(United States) Betty Bush (a)	82-81-74-76=313	+25	0
6	(United States) Mary Lena Faulk (a)	79-77-81-80=317	+29	0
T7	(United States) Dorothy Kirby (a)	81-77-80-80=318	+30	0
T7	(United States) Marjorie Lindsay (a)	80-80-79-79=318	+30	0
T7	(United States) Helen Sigel (a)	77-81-82-78=318	+30	0
10	(United States) Estelle Lawson Page (a)	80-83-74-82=319	+31	0
