= 1950 U.S. Women's Open =

Coordinates: 37.681°N 97.454°W

Tournament information
- Dates: September 28 – October 1, 1950
- Location: Wichita, Kansas
- Course: Rolling Hills Country Club
- Organized by: LPGA Tour
- Tour: LPGA Tour
- Format: Stroke play – 72 holes

Statistics
- Par: 75
- Length: 6,203 yards (5,672 m)
- Prize fund: $5,000
- Winner's share: $1,250

Champion
- (United States) Babe Zaharias
- 291 (−9)

Location in the United States

The 1950 U.S. Women's Open was the fifth U.S. Women's Open, held September 28 to October 1 at Rolling Hills Country Club in Wichita, Kansas.

Babe Zaharias won the second of her three U.S. Women's Open titles, nine strokes ahead of runner-up Betsy Rawls, an amateur. Defending champion Louise Suggs finished in solo third. Zaharias entered the final round with a four stroke lead over Rawls. It was the seventh of ten major championships for Zaharias, and Rawls won the title the following year.

The formation of the LPGA was announced during this championship, which was not run by the United States Golf Association (USGA) until 1953. The U.S. Women's Open returned to Wichita five years later in 1955 at Wichita Country Club.

== Final leaderboard ==
Sunday, October 1, 1950

Place	Player	Score	To par	Money ($)
1	(United States) Babe Zaharias	75-76-70-70=291	−9	1,250
2	(United States) Betsy Rawls (a)	76-74-75-75=300	E	0
3	(United States) Louise Suggs	74-76-78-74=302	+2	1,000
4	(United States) Helen Dettweiler	79-76-73-76=304	+4	700
5	(United States) Patty Berg	77-77-81-72=307	+7	500
T6	(United States) Marlene Bauer	79-76-76-77=308	+8	400
T6	(Uruguay) Fay Crocker (a)	80-79-73-76=308	+8	0
T6	(United States) Beverly Hanson (a)	76-79-73-80=308	+8	0
9	(United States) Betty Bush (a)	76-73-78-87=314	+14	0
10	(United States) Betty Jameson	77-86-75-77=315	+15	300
