= U.S. Women's Open =

Annual golf tournament

Tournament information
- Location: Pacific Palisades, California (in 2026)
- Established: 1946, 80 years ago
- Courses: Riviera Country Club (in 2026)
- Par: 71 (in 2026)
- Length: 6,685 yd (6,113 m) (in 2026)
- Organized by: USGA (since 1953)
- Tour: LPGA Tour
- Format: Stroke play
- Prize fund: $12.5 million (in 2026)
- Month played: May/June
- Website: uswomensopen.com

Tournament record score
- Aggregate: 271 Minjee Lee (2022)
- To par: −16 Juli Inkster (1999)

Current champion
- (United States) Nelly Korda

Current tournament
- 2026 U.S. Women's Open

The U.S. Women's Open is one of 15 national golf championships conducted by the United States Golf Association (USGA), and is the oldest of the LPGA Tour's five major championships, which includes the Chevron Championship, Women's PGA Championship, Women's Open Championship, and The Evian Championship.

Established 80 years ago in 1946, the U.S. Women's Open is the only event to have been recognized as a major by the LPGA since the group's founding in 1950. Originally operated by the Women's Professional Golfers Association (WPGA) for its first three years and the LPGA for the next four, it became a USGA event in 1953. Since 2018, the tournament has normally been held the week after Memorial Day. The U.S. Women's Open is the second major of the LPGA season and has the highest purse in women's golf. The most recent increase, announced in January 2022, saw the purse nearly double from its previous $5.5 million (2019–2021) to $10 million starting in 2022. The 2022 purse increase came about when the nonprofit health care company ProMedica was announced as the tournament's presenting sponsor.

For 2020, it was the final major of the year and was held for the first time over two courses, as it was postponed to December, due to the COVID-19 pandemic that postponed golf tournaments from March through June.

In 2007, international players outnumbered Americans for the first time. The 2008 tournament was won by South Korean Inbee Park, who became the event's youngest winner ever at age 19 years, 11 months, 17 days. In 2021, Yuka Saso matched Park as the youngest winner ever.

Since 2018, the U.S. Women's Open has normally been held prior to its men's counterpart rather than following it and the U.S. Senior Open. In announcing this schedule change, the USGA stated that it would "provide optimum playing conditions for the world's best players across a broader variety of the country's finest golf courses."

The playoff format was modified in 2018, reduced from three to two aggregate holes, followed by sudden death. The last 18-hole playoff was in 2006; the three-hole playoff was introduced the following year and used in 2011 and 2016.

In 2024, the USGA announced a new presenting sponsor, Ally Financial, and an increase in prize money. There was also a change to the winner's share of the purse, with the men's and women's open winner earning 20% of the total; $2.4 million for that year's Women's Open winner.

== Qualification ==
The U.S. Women's Open is open to any professional or amateur female golfer. Amateurs must have an up-to-date USGA Handicap Index not exceeding 2.4, lowered in 2014 from 4.4 in 2013. Players may obtain a place by being exempt or by competing successfully in qualifying.

In 2002, a two-stage method of qualification was introduced: 18 holes for local qualifying and 36 holes for sectional qualifying. In 2010, the qualification process reverted to a single sectional stage of 36 holes played on a single day.

The criteria for exemption from qualifying has changed through the years. In 2010, there were eleven exemption categories, including winners of the U.S. Women's Open for the last ten years, winners of the other three majors for the last five years, the top 50 from the previous year's LPGA Tour money list, the top five from the previous year's Japan LPGA Tour, Korea LPGA Tour, and Ladies European Tour money lists, and official winners of LPGA co-sponsored events for the 52-week period prior to the U.S. Women's Open.

There is no upper or lower age limit. The youngest-ever qualifiers were 11-year-old Lucy Li in 2014, and 12-year-old Lexi Thompson in 2007.

Winners of major amateur tournaments are also exempt. Currently, winners of the U.S. Girls' Junior, and U.S. Women's Mid-Amateur and the finalist of the U.S. Women's Amateur (all USGA events) are exempt provided they did not turn professional beforehand. Winners of the Augusta National Women's Amateur Championship will qualify effective with the inaugural tournament in 2019. The U.S. Women's Amateur champion is exempt, regardless of turning professional between the Women's Amateur and the U.S. Women's Open as a result of an August 2019 rule change by the USGA.

== Winners ==
The number following some winners' names indicates the cumulative number of U.S. Women's Open wins for that player.

Year	Champion	Score	To Par	Margin of Victory	Runner(s)-up	Purse ($)	Winner's share ($)	Venue	Location
2026	(United States) Nelly Korda	276	−8	1 stroke	(England) Charley Hull (Mexico) Gaby López	12,500,000	2,500,000	Riviera Country Club	Pacific Palisades, CA
2025	(Sweden) Maja Stark	281	−7	2 strokes	(United States) Nelly Korda (Japan) Rio Takeda	12,000,000	2,400,000	Erin Hills	Erin, WI
2024	(Japan) Yuka Saso (2)	276	−4	3 strokes	(Japan) Hinako Shibuno	12,000,000	2,400,000	Lancaster Country Club, Meadowcreek/Dogwood Course	Lancaster, PA
2023	(United States) Allisen Corpuz	279	−9	3 strokes	(England) Charley Hull (South Korea) Jiyai Shin	11,000,000	2,000,000	Pebble Beach Golf Links	Pebble Beach, CA
2022	(Australia) Minjee Lee	271	−13	4 strokes	(United States) Mina Harigae	10,000,000	1,800,000	Pine Needles Lodge and Golf Club	Southern Pines, NC
2021	(Philippines) Yuka Saso	280	−4	Playoff	(Japan) Nasa Hataoka	5,500,000	1,000,000	Olympic Club, Lake Course	San Francisco, CA
2020	(South Korea) Kim A-lim	281	−3	1 stroke	(South Korea) Ko Jin-young (United States) Amy Olson	5,500,000	1,000,000	Champions Golf Club, Cypress Creek and Jackrabbit Courses	Houston, TX
2019	(South Korea) Lee Jeong-eun	278	−6	2 strokes	(South Korea) Ryu So-yeon (United States) Lexi Thompson (United States) Angel Yin	5,500,000	1,000,000	Country Club of Charleston	Charleston, SC
2018	(Thailand) Ariya Jutanugarn	277	−11	Playoff	(South Korea) Kim Hyo-joo	5,000,000	900,000	Shoal Creek Golf and Country Club	Shoal Creek, AL
2017	(South Korea) Park Sung-hyun	277	−11	2 strokes	(South Korea) Choi Hye-jin (a)	5,000,000	900,000	Trump National Golf Club	Bedminster, NJ
2016	(United States) Brittany Lang	282	−6	Playoff	(Sweden) Anna Nordqvist	4,500,000	810,000	CordeValle Golf Club	San Martin, CA
2015	(South Korea) Chun In-gee	272	−8	1 stroke	(South Korea) Amy Yang	4,500,000	810,000	Lancaster Country Club	Lancaster, PA
2014	(United States) Michelle Wie	278	−2	2 strokes	(United States) Stacy Lewis	4,000,000	720,000	Pinehurst Resort, Course No. 2	Pinehurst, NC
2013	(South Korea) Inbee Park (2)	280	−8	4 strokes	(South Korea) I.K. Kim	3,250,000	585,000	Sebonack Golf Club	Southampton, NY
2012	(South Korea) Na Yeon Choi	281	−7	4 strokes	(South Korea) Amy Yang	3,250,000	585,000	Blackwolf Run, composite course	Kohler, WI
2011	(South Korea) Ryu So-yeon	281	−3	Playoff	(South Korea) Hee Kyung Seo	3,250,000	585,000	Broadmoor Golf Club, East Course	Colorado Springs, CO
2010	(United States) Paula Creamer	281	−3	4 strokes	(South Korea) Na Yeon Choi (Norway) Suzann Pettersen	3,250,000	585,000	Oakmont Country Club	Plum, PA
2009	(South Korea) Ji Eun-hee	284	E	1 stroke	(United States) Candie Kung	3,250,000	585,000	Saucon Valley Country Club	Upper Saucon Township, PA
2008	(South Korea) Inbee Park	283	−9	4 strokes	(Sweden) Helen Alfredsson	3,250,000	585,000	Interlachen Country Club	Edina, MN
2007	(United States) Cristie Kerr	279	−5	2 strokes	(Brazil) Angela Park (Mexico) Lorena Ochoa	3,100,000	560,000	Pine Needles Lodge and Golf Club	Southern Pines, NC
2006	(Sweden) Annika Sörenstam (3)	284	E	Playoff	(United States) Pat Hurst	3,100,000	560,000	Newport Country Club	Newport, RI
2005	(South Korea) Birdie Kim	287	+3	2 strokes	(United States) Brittany Lang (a) (United States) Morgan Pressel (a)	3,100,000	560,000	Cherry Hills Country Club	Cherry Hills Village, CO
2004	(United States) Meg Mallon (2)	274	−10	2 strokes	(Sweden) Annika Sörenstam	3,100,000	560,000	The Orchards Golf Club	South Hadley, MA
2003	(United States) Hilary Lunke	283	−1	Playoff	(United States) Angela Stanford (United States) Kelly Robbins	3,100,000	560,000	Pumpkin Ridge Golf Club, Witch Hollow Course	North Plains, OR
2002	(United States) Juli Inkster (2)	276	−4	2 strokes	(Sweden) Annika Sörenstam	3,000,000	535,000	Prairie Dunes Golf Club	Hutchinson, KS
2001	(Australia) Karrie Webb (2)	273	−7	8 strokes	(South Korea) Pak Se-ri	2,900,000	520,000	Pine Needles Lodge and Golf Club	Southern Pines, NC
2000	(Australia) Karrie Webb	282	−6	5 strokes	(United States) Cristie Kerr (United States) Meg Mallon	2,750,000	500,000	Merit Club	Libertyville, IL
1999	(United States) Juli Inkster	272	−16	5 strokes	(United States) Sherri Turner	1,750,000	315,000	Old Waverly Golf Club	West Point, MS
1998	(South Korea) Pak Se-ri	290	+6	Playoff	(United States) Jenny Chuasiriporn (a)	1,500,000	267,500	Blackwolf Run, composite course	Kohler, WI
1997	(England) Alison Nicholas	274	−10	1 stroke	(United States) Nancy Lopez	1,300,000	232,500	Pumpkin Ridge Golf Club, Witch Hollow Course	North Plains, OR
1996	(Sweden) Annika Sörenstam (2)	272	−8	6 strokes	(United States) Kris Tschetter	1,200,000	212,500	Pine Needles Lodge and Golf Club	Southern Pines, NC
1995	(Sweden) Annika Sörenstam	278	−2	1 stroke	(United States) Meg Mallon	1,000,000	175,000	Broadmoor Golf Club, East Course	Colorado Springs, CO
1994	(United States) Patty Sheehan (2)	277	−7	1 stroke	(United States) Tammie Green	850,000	155,000	Indianwood Golf and Country Club, Old Course	Lake Orion, MI
1993	(United States) Lauri Merten	280	−8	1 stroke	(Sweden) Helen Alfredsson (United States) Donna Andrews	800,000	144,000	Crooked Stick Golf Club	Carmel, IN
1992	(United States) Patty Sheehan	280	−4	Playoff	(United States) Juli Inkster	700,000	130,000	Oakmont Country Club	Plum, PA
1991	(United States) Meg Mallon	283	−1	2 strokes	(United States) Pat Bradley	600,000	110,000	Colonial Country Club	Fort Worth, TX
1990	(United States) Betsy King (2)	284	−4	1 stroke	(United States) Patty Sheehan	500,000	85,000	Atlanta Athletic Club, Riverside Course	Duluth, GA (Note: The club is located in a portion of the Duluth postal area that became part of the newly incorporated city of Johns Creek in 2006. Although the club is still served by the Duluth post office, it now lists its mailing address as Johns Creek.)
1989	(United States) Betsy King	278	−2	4 strokes	(United States) Nancy Lopez	450,000	80,000	Indianwood Golf and Country Club, Old Course	Lake Orion, MI
1988	(Sweden) Liselotte Neumann	277	−7	3 strokes	(United States) Patty Sheehan	400,000	70,000	Baltimore Country Club, Five Farms, East Course	Baltimore, MD
1987	(England) Laura Davies	285	−3	Playoff	(Japan) Ayako Okamoto (United States) JoAnne Carner	325,000	55,000	Plainfield Country Club	Edison, NJ
1986	(United States) Jane Geddes	287	−1	Playoff	(South Africa) (United States) Sally Little	300,000	50,000	NCR Country Club	Kettering, OH
1985	(United States) Kathy Baker	280	−8	3 strokes	(United States) Judy Clark	250,000	41,975	Baltusrol Golf Club, Upper Course	Springfield, NJ
1984	(United States) Hollis Stacy (3)	290	+2	1 stroke	(United States) Rosie Jones	225,000	36,000	Salem Country Club	Peabody, MA
1983	(Australia) Jan Stephenson	290	+6	1 stroke	(United States) JoAnne Carner (United States) Patty Sheehan	200,000	32,780	Cedar Ridge Country Club	Broken Arrow, OK
1982	(United States) Janet Alex	283	−5	6 strokes	(United States) Beth Daniel (United States) Donna White (United States) JoAnne Carner (United States) Sandra Haynie	175,000	27,315	Del Paso Country Club	Sacramento, CA
1981	(United States) Pat Bradley	279	−9	1 stroke	(United States) Beth Daniel	150,000	22,000	La Grange Country Club	La Grange, IL
1980	(United States) Amy Alcott	280	−4	9 strokes	(United States) Hollis Stacy	140,000	20,047	Richland Country Club	Nashville, TN
1979	(United States) Jerilyn Britz	284	E	2 strokes	(United States) Debbie Massey (United States) Sandra Palmer	125,000	19,000	Brooklawn Country Club	Fairfield, CT
1978	(United States) Hollis Stacy (2)	289	+5	1 stroke	(United States) JoAnne Carner (South Africa) Sally Little	100,000	15,000	Country Club of Indianapolis	Indianapolis, IN
1977	(United States) Hollis Stacy	292	+4	2 strokes	(United States) Nancy Lopez	75,000	11,040	Hazeltine National Golf Club	Chaska, MN
1976	(United States) JoAnne Carner (2)	292	+8	Playoff	(United States) Sandra Palmer	60,000	9,054	Rolling Green Golf Club	Springfield, PA
1975	(United States) Sandra Palmer	295	+7	4 strokes	(United States) JoAnne Carner (Canada) Sandra Post (United States) Nancy Lopez (a)	55,000	8,044	Atlantic City Country Club	Northfield, NJ
1974	(United States) Sandra Haynie	295	+7	1 stroke	(United States) Beth Stone (United States) Carol Mann	40,000	6,073	La Grange Country Club	La Grange, IL
1973	(United States) Susie Berning (3)	290	+2	5 strokes	(United States) Gloria Ehret (United States) Shelley Hamlin	40,000	6,000	Country Club of Rochester	Rochester, NY
1972	(United States) Susie Berning (2)	299	+11	1 stroke	(United States) Kathy Ahern (United States) Pam Barnett (United States) Judy Rankin	40,000	6,000	Winged Foot Golf Club, East Course	Mamaroneck, NY
1971	(United States) JoAnne Carner	288	E	7 strokes	(United States) Kathy Whitworth	31,000	5,000	Kahkwa Club	Erie, PA
1970	(United States) Donna Caponi (2)	287	+3	1 stroke	(United States) Sandra Haynie (United States) Sandra Spuzich	20,000	4,000	Muskogee Golf Club	Muskogee, OK
1969	(United States) Donna Caponi	294	+2	1 stroke	(United States) Peggy Wilson	31,040	5,000	Scenic Hills Country Club	Pensacola, FL
1968	(United States) Susie Berning	289	+5	3 strokes	(United States) Mickey Wright	25,000	5,000	Moselem Springs Golf Club	Fleetwood, PA
1967	(France) Catherine Lacoste (a)	294	+6	2 strokes	(United States) Susie Maxwell (United States) Beth Stone	25,000	0	The Homestead	Hot Springs, VA
1966	(United States) Sandra Spuzich	297	+9	1 stroke	(United States) Carol Mann	20,000	4,000	Hazeltine National Golf Club	Chaska, MN
1965	(United States) Carol Mann	290	+2	2 strokes	(United States) Kathy Cornelius	17,780	3,800	Atlantic City Country Club	Northfield, NJ
1964	(United States) Mickey Wright (4)	290	−2	Playoff	(United States) Ruth Jessen	9,900	2,090	San Diego Country Club	Chula Vista, CA
1963	(United States) Mary Mills	289	−3	3 strokes	(United States) Louise Suggs (United States) Sandra Haynie	9,000	1,900	Kenwood Country Club	Cincinnati, OH
1962	(United States) Murle Lindstrom	301	+13	2 strokes	(United States) Ruth Jessen (United States) Jo Ann Prentice	8,000	1,800	Dunes Golf and Beach Club	Myrtle Beach, SC
1961	(United States) Mickey Wright (3)	293	+5	6 strokes	(United States) Betsy Rawls	8,000	1,800	Baltusrol Golf Club, Lower Course	Springfield, NJ
1960	(United States) Betsy Rawls (4)	292	+4	1 stroke	(United States) Joyce Ziske	7,200	1,710	Worcester Country Club	Worcester, MA
1959	(United States) Mickey Wright (2)	287	+7	2 strokes	(United States) Louise Suggs	7,200	1,800	Churchill Valley Country Club	Pittsburgh, PA
1958	(United States) Mickey Wright	290	−2	5 strokes	(United States) Louise Suggs	7,200	1,800	Forest Lake Country Club	Bloomfield Hills, MI
1957	(United States) Betsy Rawls (3)	299	+7	6 strokes	(United States) Patty Berg	7,200	1,800	Winged Foot Golf Club, East Course	Mamaroneck, NY
1956	(United States) Kathy Cornelius	302	+7	Playoff	(United States) Barbara McIntire (a)	6,000	1,500	Northland Country Club	Duluth, MN
1955	(Uruguay) Fay Crocker	299	+11	4 strokes	(United States) Mary Lena Faulk (United States) Louise Suggs	7,500	2,000	Wichita Country Club	Wichita, KS
1954	(United States) Babe Zaharias (3)	291	+3	12 strokes	(United States) Betty Hicks	7,500	2,000	Salem Country Club	Peabody, MA
1953	(United States) Betsy Rawls (2)	302	+6	Playoff	(United States) Jackie Pung	7,500	2,000	Country Club of Rochester	Rochester, NY
1952	(United States) Louise Suggs (2)	284	+8	7 strokes	(United States) Marlene Bauer (United States) Betty Jameson	7,500	1,750	Bala Golf Club	Philadelphia, PA
1951	(United States) Betsy Rawls	293	+5	5 strokes	(United States) Louise Suggs	7,500	1,500	Druid Hills Golf Club	Atlanta, GA
1950	(United States) Babe Zaharias (2)	291	−9	9 strokes	(United States) Betsy Rawls (a)	5,000	1,250	Rolling Hills Country Club	Wichita, KS
1949	(United States) Louise Suggs	291	−9	14 strokes	(United States) Babe Zaharias	7,500	1,500	Prince George's Golf and Country Club	Landover, MD
1948	(United States) Babe Zaharias	300	E	8 strokes	(United States) Betty Hicks	7,500	1,200	Atlantic City Country Club	Northfield, NJ
1947	(United States) Betty Jameson	295	−9	6 strokes	(United States) Polly Riley (a) (United States) Sally Sessions (a)	7,500	1,200	Starmount Forest Country Club	Greensboro, NC
1946	(United States) Patty Berg †	5 & 4			(United States) Betty Jameson	19,700	5,600	Spokane Country Club	Spokane, WA

(a) = Amateur
† = Won 5 and 4 over Betty Jameson in 36-hole match play final

== Multiple champions ==
This table lists the golfers who have won more than one U.S. Women's Open.

Career Grand Slam winners ‡

Golfer	Total	Years
(United States) Betsy Rawls	4	1951, 1953, 1957, 1960
(United States) Mickey Wright ‡	4	1958, 1959, 1961, 1964
(United States) Babe Zaharias	3	1948, 1950, 1954
(United States) Susie Berning	3	1968, 1972, 1973
(United States) Hollis Stacy	3	1977, 1978, 1984
(Sweden) Annika Sörenstam ‡	3	1995, 1996, 2006
(United States) Louise Suggs ‡	2	1949, 1952
(United States) Donna Caponi	2	1969, 1970
(United States) JoAnne Carner	2	1971, 1976
(United States) Betsy King	2	1989, 1990
(United States) Patty Sheehan	2	1992, 1994
(Australia) Karrie Webb ‡	2	2000, 2001
(United States) Juli Inkster ‡	2	1999, 2002
(United States) Meg Mallon	2	1991, 2004
(South Korea) Inbee Park ‡	2	2008, 2013
(Japan) Yuka Saso	2	2021, 2024

The defending champion has retained the title on seven occasions, most recently in 2001:

- 2001 - Karrie Webb
- 1996 - Annika Sörenstam
- 1990 - Betsy King
- 1978 - Hollis Stacy
- 1973 - Susie Berning
- 1970 - Donna Caponi
- 1959 - Mickey Wright

== Future sites ==
Year	Edition	Course	Location	Dates	Previous championships hosted
2027	82nd	Inverness Club	Toledo, Ohio	June 3–6	
2028	83rd	Oakmont Country Club	Plum, Pennsylvania	June 1–4	1992, 2010
2029	84th	Pinehurst No. 2	Pinehurst, North Carolina	June 7–10	2014
2030	85th	Interlachen Country Club	Edina, Minnesota	May 30 – June 2	2008
2031	86th	Oakland Hills Country Club (South Course)	Bloomfield Township, Michigan	TBD	
2032	87th	Los Angeles Country Club (North Course)	Los Angeles, California	TBD	
2033	88th	Chicago Golf Club	Wheaton, Illinois	TBD	
2034	89th	Merion Golf Club	Haverford, Pennsylvania	TBD	
2035	90th	Pebble Beach Golf Links	Pebble Beach, California	TBD	2023
2036	91st	Shinnecock Hills Golf Club	Shinnecock Hills, New York	TBD	
2037	92nd	Oak Hill Country Club (East Course)	Rochester, New York	TBD	
2038	93rd	Oakmont Country Club	Plum, Pennsylvania	TBD	
2039	94th	TBD	TBD	TBD	
2040	95th	Pebble Beach Golf Links	Pebble Beach, California	TBD	
2041	96th	TBD	TBD	TBD	
2042	97th	Oakland Hills Country Club (South Course)	Bloomfield Township, Michigan	TBD	
2043	98th	TBD	TBD	TBD	
2044	99th	Lancaster Country Club	Lancaster, Pennsylvania	TBD	2015, 2024
2045	100th	The Country Club	Brookline, Massachusetts	TBD	
2046	101st	Merion Golf Club	Haverford, Pennsylvania	TBD	
2047	102nd	TBD	TBD	TBD	
2048	103rd	Pebble Beach Golf Links	Pebble Beach, California	TBD	

== See also ==
- Golf in the United States
