= 1950 Women's Western Open =

Golf tournament

Coordinates: 39.643°N 104.963°W

Tournament information
- Dates: June 19–24, 1950
- Location: Cherry Hills Village, Colorado
- Course: Cherry Hills Country Club
- Tour: LPGA Tour
- Format: Stroke play/match play

Statistics
- Par: 74
- Length: 6,287 yards (5,749 m)
- Field: 100 players, 32 to match play
- Cut: 95 (+21)
- Prize fund: $500
- Winner's share: $500

Champion
- Babe Zaharias
- def. Peggy Kirk (a), 5&3
- Location within the United States Location within Colorado

The 1950 Women's Western Open was a golf competition held at Cherry Hills Country Club in Cherry Hills Village, Colorado on June 19–24. It was the 21st edition of the Women's Western Open.

The field of 100 golfers played an 18-hole qualifying round to determine the 32 players advancing to match play. Grace DeMoss won medalist honors with a qualifying round of 75 (+1). Match play was over 18 holes for each round except the 36-hole final. After the first round of match play, seven professional and nine amateur golfers remained in the field.

Babe Zaharias won the championship in match play competition by defeating Peggy Kirk in the final match, 5 and 3. Zaharias earned the entire purse of $500.

== Final 16 bracket ==
Round of 16; June 21
Carol Bowman (a)	2&1
Grace DeMoss (a)
Claire Doran (a)	1up
Beverly Hanson (a)
Betty Jameson	5&4
Betsy Rawls
Peggy Kirk (a)	5&4
Barbara Dawson (a)
Betty MacKinnon (a)	1up
Louise Suggs
Babe Zaharias	4&3
Marjorie Lindsay (a)
Patty Berg	3&2
Helen Dettweiler
Betty Bush (a)	2&1
Marilynn Smith

Quarterfinals; June 22
Carol Bowman (a)
Claire Doran (a)	3&2
Betty Jameson
Peggy Kirk (a)	1up
Betty MacKinnon (a)
Babe Zaharias	4&3
Patty Berg	4&3
Betty Bush (a)

Semifinals; June 23
Claire Doran (a)
Peggy Kirk (a)	2up
Babe Zaharias
Patty Berg	1up

Finals; June 24
Peggy Kirk (a)
Babe Zaharias	5&3
