= George Zaharias =

American professional wrestler and sports promoter (1908–1984)

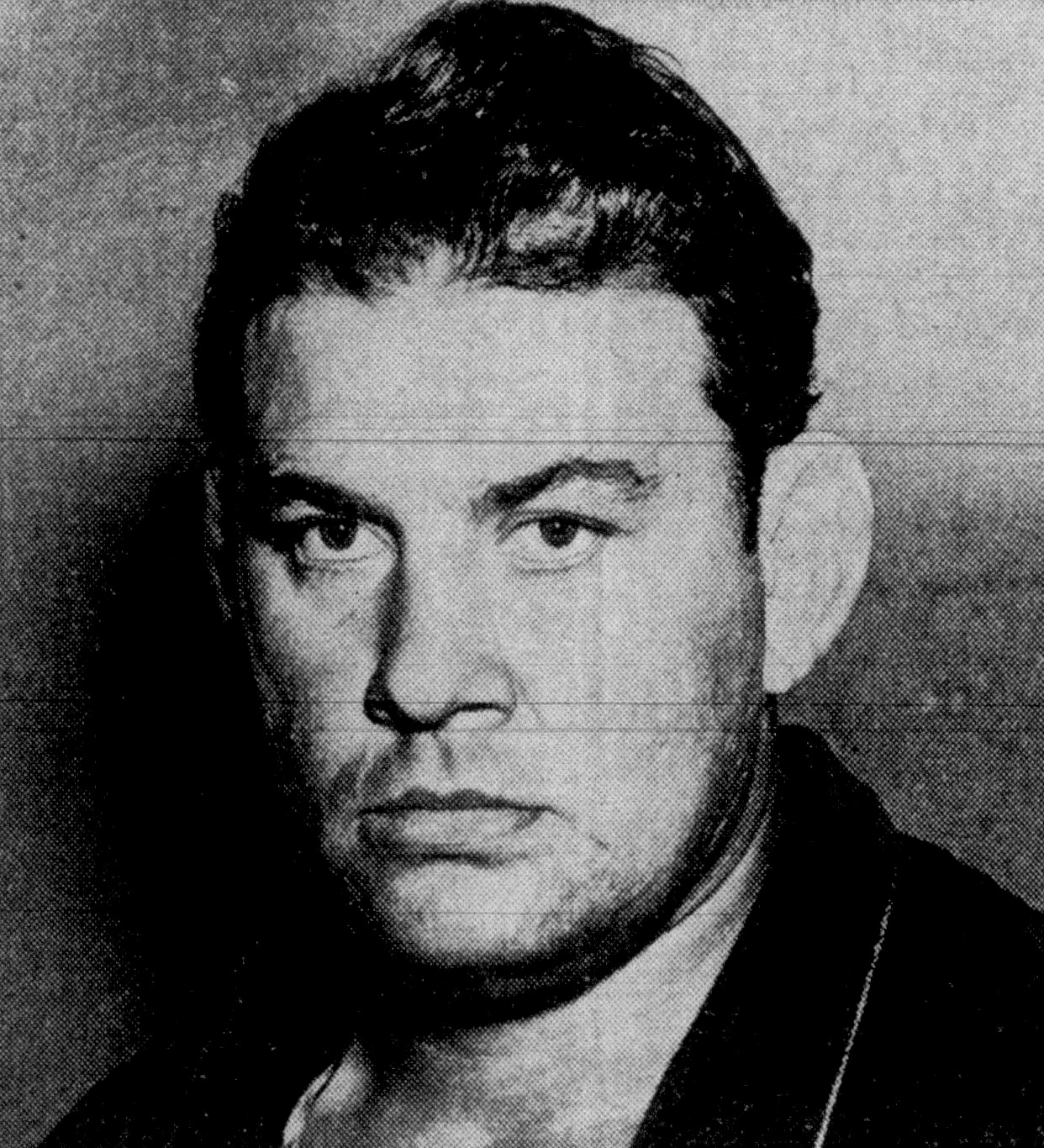
- Zaharias c. 1942

Personal information
- Native name: Θεοδόσιος Βετογιάννης
- Other names: Theodore Vetoyanis
- Born: Theodosios Vetoyanis; February 27, 1908 Pueblo, Colorado, U.S.
- Died: May 22, 1984 (aged 76) Tampa, Florida, U.S.

Professional wrestling career
- Ring name: George Zaharias
- Billed weight: 300 lb (140 kg)
- Debut: c. 1930
- Retired: 1938

Theodosios Vetoyanis (Greek: Θεοδόσιος Βετογιάννης; February 27, 1908 – May 22, 1984, also known as Theodore Vetyoanis) was an American professional wrestler and sports promoter known by his ring name George Zaharias. He was also popularly known as "The Crying Greek from Cripple Creek" or "The Greek Hyena" during the 1930s. Often cast as a villain or sore loser, one of his most celebrated bouts was a 1932 match with Jim Londos at a sold-out Maple Leaf Gardens in Toronto, which Londos won. The audience of 14,500 was the highest attendance for any North American wrestling match that year.

== Background ==
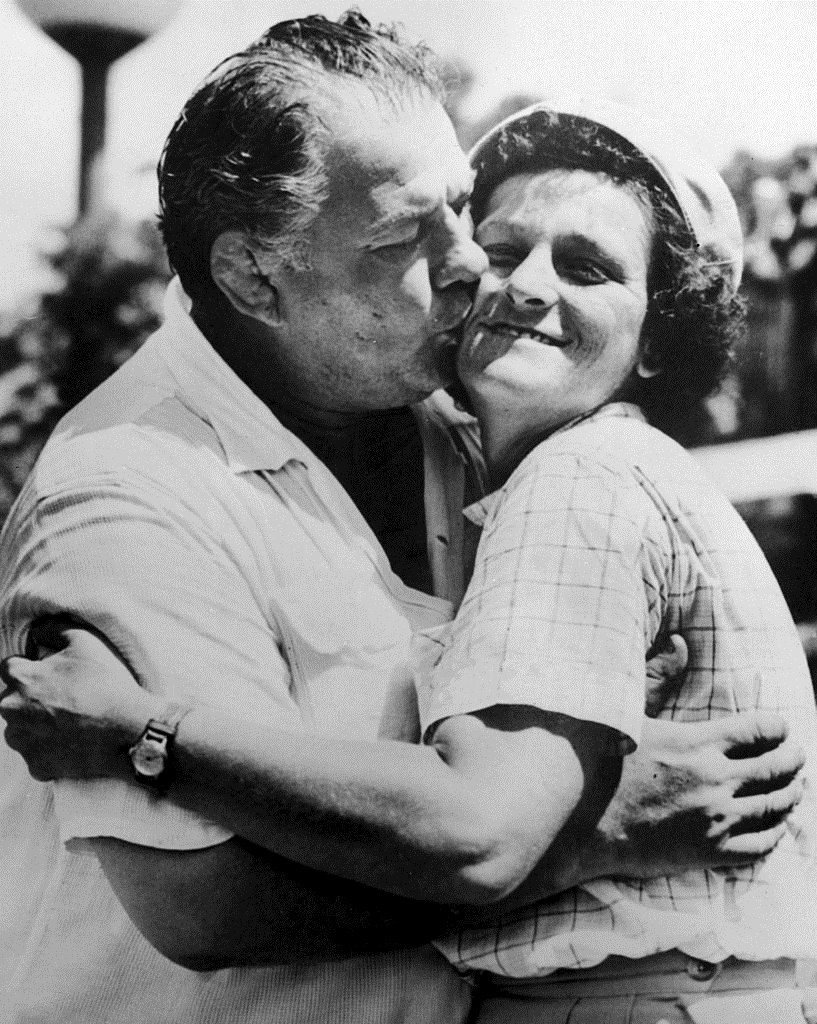
Zaharias with his first wife, Babe Didrikson, c. 1955

In 1938, Zaharias met Babe Didrikson, a talented athlete best known as a golfer, at a charity golf event; the promoter had matched the wrestler, the golfer, and a minister in a threesome as a gag. Zaharias and Didrikson married later that year, and Zaharias quit wrestling in order to manage his wife's career. He promoted wrestlers and ran a cigar store in Denver. As Babe's career soared, he managed a tailoring shop, a women's sports clothier in Beverly Hills, California, and a golf course in Florida, where the couple retired. He also did some part-time acting.

The Zahariases had no children and were rebuffed by authorities when they sought to adopt. After Babe's death he married actress Betty Burgess in January 1960 in Las Vegas. In Feb. 28, 1981 he married Harriet Apostolos, one of Babe's nurses, until his death. He died in Tampa, Florida, having outlived Babe by 28 years.

== Popular Culture ==
In 1975, Alex Karras portrayed George Zaharias in the TV movie Babe, (opposite his future wife, actress Susan Clark), which told the story of Didrikson, who won two gold medals in track and field at the 1932 Olympics and returned to become a champion golfer, her battles to be accepted as a woman in a man's sports world, and her fight against cancer.

== Championships and accomplishments ==
- Professional Wrestling Hall of Fame and Museum
  - Class of 2020
