= Texas Women's Open =

Golf tournament

The Texas Women's Open is a golf tournament that originated in 1933 in the Fort Worth, Texas area. From 1950 to 1954, it was an LPGA Tour event. The Women's Texas Open stopped in 1955, and was revived by the North Texas section of the PGA of America in 2001 in the Dallas–Fort Worth metroplex to promote interest in women's golf in the region. The 2020 event featured a stronger than normal field as several LPGA Tour players competed due to the hiatus caused by the COVID-19 pandemic.

== 2020 Open ==
One of the strongest fields in the history of the Texas Women's Open occurred in 2020. Due to the Worldwide Covid-19 pandemic, many LPGA professionals, Olympians, and World-ranked Amateurs competed in the tournament hosted at the Golf Clubs at the Tribute's Old American Golf Course, located in The Colony, TX. 55 professionals and 64 amateurs competed in the 2020 Open.

Notable players for that year included:

- Stacy Lewis
- Gerina Piller
- Brittany Lang
- Cheyenne Knight
- Celine Boutier (Champion)

In 2025, The Northern Texas PGA announced a partnership with the ANNIKA Women's All Pro Tour in support of the 2025 and 2026 Destination Grapevine Texas Women's Open.

== Tournament locations ==
Years	Venue	Location
1933	Glen Garden Golf & Country Club	Fort Worth, Texas
1934–1936, 1938–1939, 1941, 1947–1955	River Crest Country Club	Fort Worth, Texas
1937, 1940, 1945–1946	Colonial Country Club	Fort Worth, Texas
2001–2011	Eastern Hills Country Club	Garland, Texas
2012	The Lakes at Castle Hills	Lewisville, Texas
2013	Old American Golf Club	The Colony, Texas
2014–2018	Rolling Hills Country Club	Arlington, Texas
2019, 2021	Firewheel Golf Park	Garland, Texas
2020	Old American Golf Club	The Colony, Texas
2022	Wildhorse Golf Club at Robson Ranch	Denton, Texas
2023	The Bridges Golf Club	Gunter, Texas
2024	Grapevine Golf Course	Grapevine, Texas
2025	Grapevine Golf Couse	Grapevine, Texas

== Winners ==
Texas Women's Open

- 2025 Sadie Englemann
- 2024 Maddie Szeryk
- 2023 Grace Jin
- 2022 Cecilie Nielsen (a)
- 2021 Kenzie Wright
- 2020 Céline Boutier
- 2019 Savannah Vilaubi
- 2018 Marissa Chow
- 2017 Chirapat Jao-Javanil
- 2016 Savannah Vilaubi
- 2015 Maddie McCrary (a)
- 2014 Ashley Knoll
- 2013 Christi Cano
- 2012 Jody Fleming
- 2011 Ashley Tait
- 2010 Cindy Figg-Currier
- 2009 Katy Jarochowicz
- 2008 Tanya Wahdwa (a)
- 2007 Shannon Fish (a)
- 2006 Carolyn Creekmore (a)
- 2005 Randi Meadows
- 2004 Mina Hardin (a)
- 2003 Lori Sutherland
- 2002 Tara Bateman
- 2001 Tara Bateman

Women's Texas Open

- 1956–2000 No tournament
- 1955 Polly Riley (a)
- 1954 Betsy Rawls
- 1953 Betsy Rawls
- 1952 Babe Zaharias
- 1951 Babe Zaharias
- 1950 Beverly Hanson (a)
- 1949 Beverly Hanson (a)
- 1948 Polly Riley (a)
- 1947 Betty Jameson (a)
- 1946 Babe Zaharias (a)
- 1945 Babe Zaharias (a)
- 1942–1944 No tournament due to World War II
- 1941 Aniela Gorczyca Goldthwaite
- 1940 Babe Zaharias (a)
- 1939 Kathryn Hemphill
- 1938 Betty Jameson (a)
- 1937 Aniela Gorczyca Goldthwaite
- 1936 Edna Saenger
- 1935 Aniela Gorczyca

Fort Worth Women's Invitation

- 1934 Mrs. Tom Wallace
- 1933 Aniela Gorczyca

(a) – amateur
