= World Championship (LPGA Tour) =

Golf tournament formerly on the LPGA Tour

The World Championship was a golf tournament on the LPGA Tour from 1948 to 1957. It was played at the Tam O'Shanter Country Club in Niles, Illinois. It was played concurrently with the men's World Championship of Golf on the PGA Tour as well as World Amateur events. The pre-1950 events are considered official LPGA wins.

== Winners ==
- 1957 Patty Berg
- 1956 Marlene Hagge
- 1955 Patty Berg
- 1954 Patty Berg
- 1953 Patty Berg
- 1952 Betty Jameson
- 1951 Babe Zaharias
- 1950 Babe Zaharias
- 1949 Babe Zaharias
- 1948 Babe Zaharias
