= Peggy Kirk Bell =

American golfer and golf instructor (1921–2016)

Personal information
- Full name: Margaret Anne Kirk Bell
- Nickname: Peggy
- Nationality: United States
- Born: October 28, 1921 Findlay, Ohio, U.S.
- Died: November 23, 2016 (aged 95) Southern Pines, North Carolina, U.S.
- Height: 5 ft 7.5 in (1.71 m)
- Spouse: Warren "Bullet" Bell

Career
- Sport: Golf
- College: Rollins College
- Turned professional: 1950
- Former tour: LPGA Tour

Best results in LPGA major championships (wins: 1)
- Western Open: 2nd: 1950
- Titleholders C'ship: Won: 1949
- Women's PGA C'ship: T3: 1958
- U.S. Women's Open: T5: 1952

Achievements and awards
- World Golf Hall of Fame: 2019 (member page)
- Bob Jones Award: 1990
- LPGA Patty Berg Award: 2013

Margaret Anne "Peggy" Kirk Bell (October 28, 1921 – November 23, 2016) was an American professional golfer and golf instructor. She was known for her strong advocacy of women's golf. She was elected to the World Golf Hall of Fame, class of 2019, in the lifetime achievement category.

== Career ==
Kirk was born in Findlay, Ohio in 1921. She started playing golf at age 17. She took to the game immediately and quickly won a number of titles. She played college golf at Rollins College. She was a member of Kappa Kappa Gamma.

Kirk played the ladies amateur tour in the 1940s before the development of a professional tour, winning three Ohio Amateurs and the 1949 Titleholders Championship and North and South Women's Amateur. She was also a member of the 1950 U.S. Curtis Cup team.

In the 1940s and 1950s, she competed as Peggy Kirk.

Late in her career, Bell owned the Pine Needles Resort in Southern Pines, North Carolina.

== Personal life ==
In 1953, she married her high school sweetheart, Warren "Bullet" Bell, who had played professional basketball with the Fort Wayne Pistons before turning to business. Warren died in 1984. Her older daughter, Bonnie, is married to former PGA Tour member Pat McGowan.

Bell died Southern Pines, North Carolina in November 2016 at the age of 95.

== Awards and honors ==
- In 1990, she was voted the Bob Jones Award, the highest honor given by the United States Golf Association in recognition of distinguished sportsmanship in golf.
- In 2002, she became the first woman voted into the World Golf Teachers Hall of Fame.
- In 2013, she earned the LPGA's Patty Berg Award, bestowed to an individual who exhibits good sportsmanship
- In 2019, she was elected to the World Golf Hall of Fame in the lifetime achievement category.

== Amateur wins ==
- 1947 Ohio Women's Amateur
- 1948 Ohio Women's Amateur
- 1949 North and South Women's Amateur, Ohio Women's Amateur

== Professional wins ==
- 1949 Titleholders Championship

== Major championships ==
=== Wins (1) ===
Year	Championship	Winning score	Margin	Runners-up
1949	Titleholders Championship	−1 (76-75-76-72=299)	2 strokes	(United States) Patty Berg, (United States) Dorothy Kirby (a)

== Team appearances ==
Amateur

- Curtis Cup (representing the United States): 1950 (winners)
