= Babe Didrikson Zaharias =

American golfer and athlete (1911–1956)

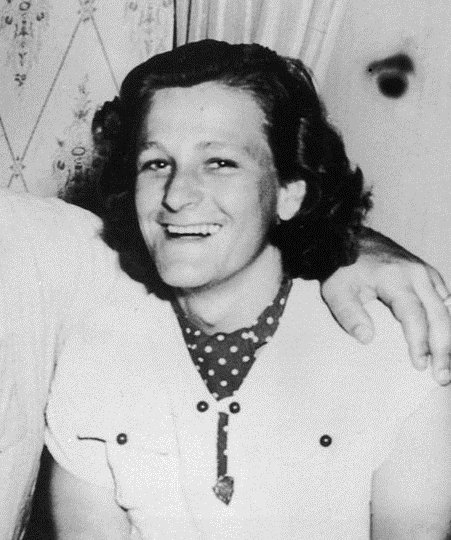
- Babe Zaharias c. 1938

Personal information
- Full name: Mildred Ella Didrikson Zaharias
- Nickname: Babe
- Nationality: United States
- Born: June 26, 1911 Port Arthur, Texas, U.S.
- Died: September 27, 1956 (aged 45) Galveston, Texas, U.S.
- Height: 5 ft 7 in (170 cm)
- Weight: 126 lb (57 kg)
- Spouse: George Zaharias (m. 1938)

Career
- Sport: Golf
- Turned professional: 1947
- Former tours: LPGA Tour (joined 1950, its founding)
- Professional wins: 48

Number of wins by tour
- LPGA Tour: 41
- Other: 7

Best results in LPGA major championships (wins: 10)
- Western Open: Won: 1940, 1944, 1945, 1950
- Titleholders C'ship: Won: 1947, 1950, 1952
- U.S. Women's Open: Won: 1948, 1950, 1954

Achievements and awards
- World Golf Hall of Fame: 1974 (member page)
- LPGA Tour Money Winner: 1950, 1951
- LPGA Vare Trophy: 1954
- Associated Press Female Athlete of the Year: 1932, 1945, 1946, 1947, 1950, 1954
- Bob Jones Award: 1957
- Presidential Medal of Freedom: 2021

Babe Didrikson Zaharias
Sport
- Sport: Athletics
- Events: Sprint, 80 m hurdles, high jump, long jump, javelin throw, discus throw, shot put
- Club: Employers' Casualty Co. Club

Achievements and titles
- Personal bests: 80 mH – 11.7 (1932); 100 m – 12.3 (1931); 200 m – 25.6 (1931); HJ – 1.65 m (1932); LJ – 5.70 m (1930); JT – 43.69 m (1932); DT – 42.06 m (1932); SP – 12.04 m (1932)
Medal record
Representing the United States
Olympic Games
Gold medal – first place	1932 Los Angeles	80 m hurdles
Gold medal – first place	1932 Los Angeles	Javelin throw
Silver medal – second place	1932 Los Angeles	High jump

Mildred Ella "Babe" Didrikson Zaharias (/zəˈhæriəs/; née Didrikson; June 26, 1911 – September 27, 1956) was an American athlete who excelled in golf, basketball, baseball, and track and field. She won two gold medals and a silver in track and field at the 1932 Summer Olympics before turning to professional golf and winning 10 LPGA major championships.

== Biography ==
Mildred Ella Didrikson was born on June 26, 1911, the sixth of seven children, in the coastal city of Port Arthur, Texas. Her mother Hannah and her father Ole Didriksen were immigrants from Norway. Although her three eldest siblings were born in Norway, Babe and her three other siblings were born in Port Arthur. She later changed the spelling of her surname from Didriksen to Didrikson. She moved with her family to 850 Doucette in Beaumont, Texas, at age 4. She claimed to have acquired the nickname "Babe" after Babe Ruth upon hitting five home runs in a childhood baseball game, but her Norwegian mother had called her "Bebe" from the time she was a toddler.

Although best known for her athletic gifts, Didrikson had many talents. She also competed in sewing. An excellent seamstress, she made many of her clothes, including her golfing outfits. She claimed to have won the sewing championship at the 1931 State Fair of Texas in Dallas; she did win the South Texas State Fair in Beaumont, embellishing the story many years later in 1953. She attended Beaumont High School. Never a strong student, she was forced to repeat the eighth grade and was a year older than her classmates. She eventually dropped out without graduating after she moved to Dallas to play basketball. She was a singer and a harmonica player and recorded several songs on the Mercury Records label. Her biggest seller was "I Felt a Little Teardrop" with "Detour" on the flip side.

Already famous as Babe Didrikson, she married George Zaharias (1908–1984), a professional wrestler, in St. Louis, Missouri, on December 23, 1938. Thereafter, she was largely known as Babe Didrikson Zaharias or Babe Zaharias.

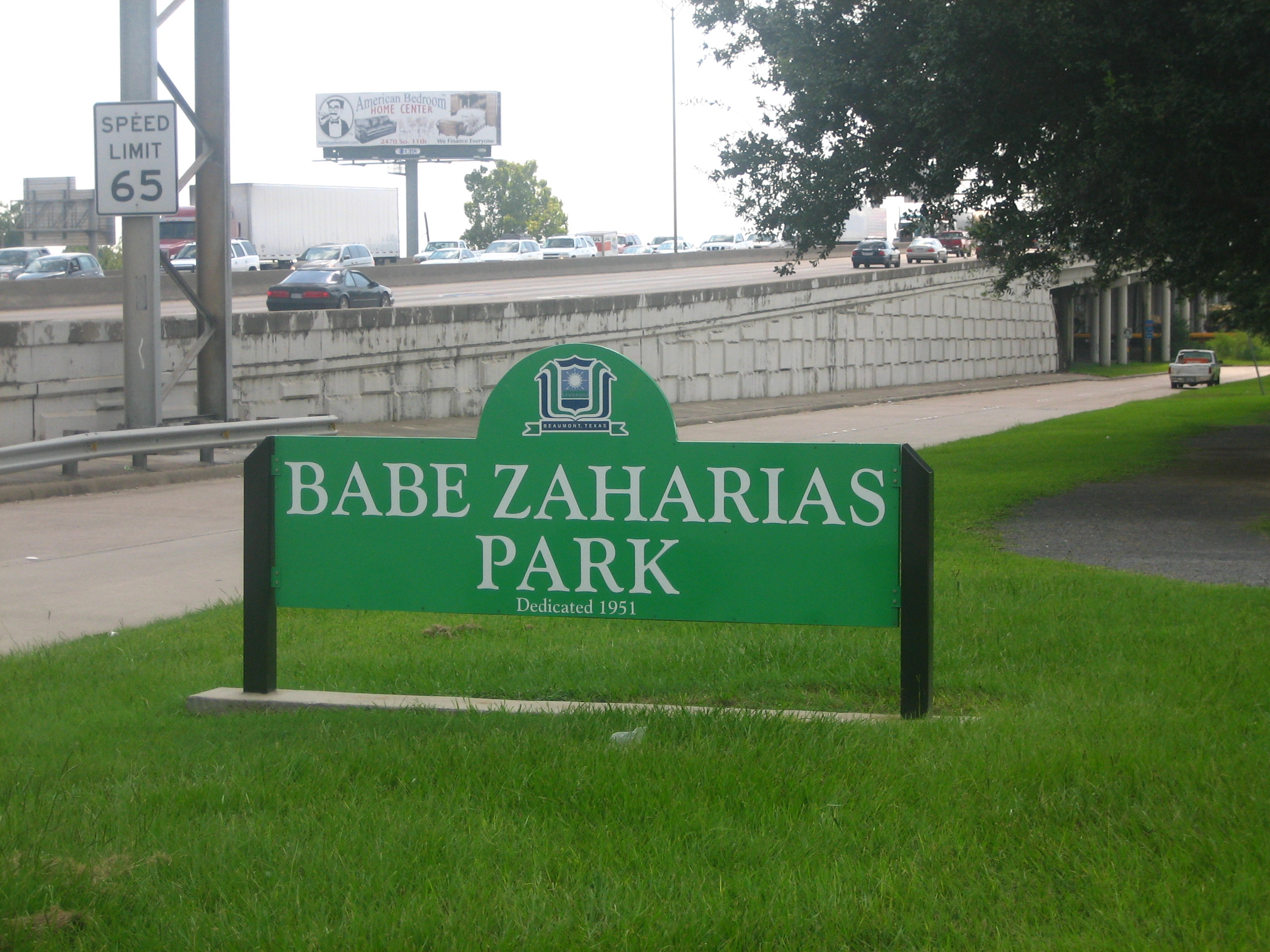
Babe Zaharias Park is located in Beaumont adjacent to her museum.

=== Athletic achievements ===
Didrikson gained world fame in track and field and was a three-time AAU All-American in basketball from 1930–1932. She played organized baseball and softball and was an expert diver, roller-skater, and bowler.

==== AAU champion ====
Didrikson's first job after high school was as a secretary for the Employers' Casualty Insurance Company of Dallas, though she was employed only in order to play basketball as an amateur on the company's "industrial team", the Golden Cyclones. As a side note, the competition was then governed by the Amateur Athletic Union (AAU). Despite leading the team to an AAU Basketball Championship in 1931, Didrikson had first achieved wider attention as a track and field athlete.

Representing her company in the 1932 AAU Championships, she competed in eight out of ten events, winning five outright, and tying for first in a sixth. Didrikson's performances were enough to win the team championship, despite her being the sole member of her team.

==== 1932 Olympics ====
Didrikson set four world records, winning two gold medals and one silver medal in track and field at the 1932 Los Angeles Olympics. In doing so, she became the first woman to win more than one event at a single Olympic Games. In the 80-meter hurdles, she equaled the world record of 11.8 seconds in her opening heat. In the final, she broke her record with an 11.7 clocking, taking gold. In the javelin, she also won gold with an Olympic record throw of 43.69 meters. In the high jump, she took silver with a world record-tying leap of 1.657 metres (5.44 ft). Fellow American Jean Shiley also jumped 1.657 metres, and the pair tied in a jump-off when the bar was raised to 1.67 metres (5.5 ft). Shiley was awarded the gold after Didrikson was ruled to have used an improper technique. She did not compete in the discus throw, as fellow American Lillian Copeland beat her out in the Olympic trials; Copeland went on to win the gold medal in discus.

Before the 1932 games, Didrikson was involved in a racist incident involving fellow athletes Tidye Pickett and Louise Stokes, both of whom were black. In Denver, on a train, Didrikson threw water on Pickett and Stokes, because Didrikson didn't like having African-American athletes on the team. Pickett and Stokes were later removed from the team, and replaced by white athletes who had qualified with slower times from the trials.

Didrikson is the only track and field athlete, male or female, to win individual Olympic medals in separate running, throwing, and jumping events.

==== Post-Olympics ====
In the following years, she performed on the vaudeville circuit, traveled with teams like Babe Didrikson's All-Americans basketball team and the bearded House of David team. Didrikson was also a competitive pocket billiards (pool) player, though not a champion. She was noted in the January 1933 press for playing (and badly losing) a multi-day straight pool match in New York City against famed female cueist Ruth McGinnis.

==== Golf ====
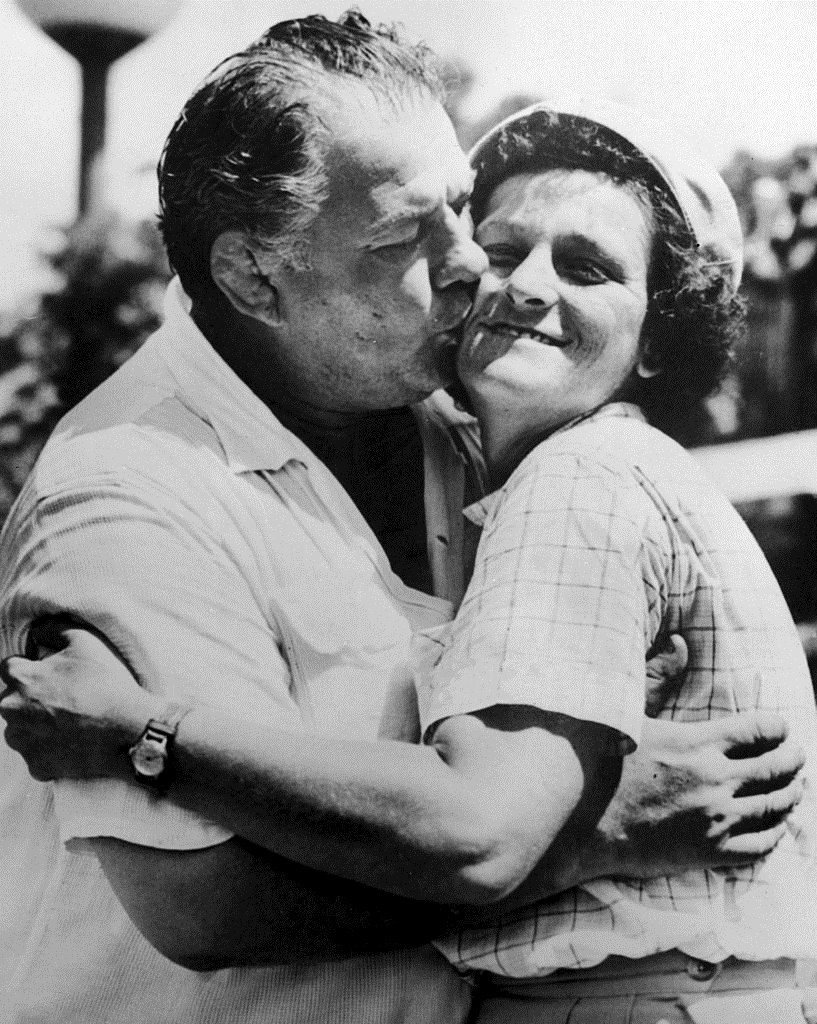
George and Babe Zaharias c. 1955

By 1935, Didrikson began to play golf, a latecomer to the sport in which she became best known. Shortly thereafter, she was denied amateur status and consequently, in January 1938, she competed in the Los Angeles Open, a PGA (Professional Golfers' Association) tournament. No other woman competed against men in this tournament until Annika Sörenstam, Suzy Whaley, Michelle Wie, and Brittany Lincicome almost six decades later. She shot 81 and 84, and missed the cut. In the tournament, she was teamed with George Zaharias. They were married eleven months later, and settled in Tampa, Florida, on the premises of a golf course that they purchased in 1949.

Didrikson became America's first female golf celebrity and the leading player of the 1940s and early 1950s. In order to regain amateur status in the sport, she could compete in no other sports for three years. She gained back her amateur status in 1942. In 1945, she participated in three more PGA Tour events, missing the cut of one of them, and making the cut of the other two; as of 2023, she remains the only woman to make the tournament cut in a regular PGA Tour event. Zaharias won the 1946 U.S. Women's Amateur and the 1947 British Ladies Amateur – the first American to do so – and three Women's Western Opens. Having formally turned professional in 1947, Didrikson dominated the Women's Professional Golf Association and later the Ladies Professional Golf Association. She was a founding member of the Ladies Professional Golf Association, in 1950. Serious illness ended her career in the mid-1950s.

Zaharias won a tournament named after her, the Babe Zaharias Open of her hometown of Beaumont, Texas. She won the 1947 Titleholders Championship and the 1948 U.S. Women's Open for her fourth and fifth major championships. She won 17 straight women's amateur victories, a feat never equaled by anyone. By 1950, she had won every golf title available. Totaling both her amateur and professional victories, Zaharias won a total of 82 golf tournaments.

Charles McGrath of The New York Times wrote of Zaharias, "Except perhaps for Arnold Palmer, no golfer has ever been more beloved by the gallery."

=== Golf awards ===
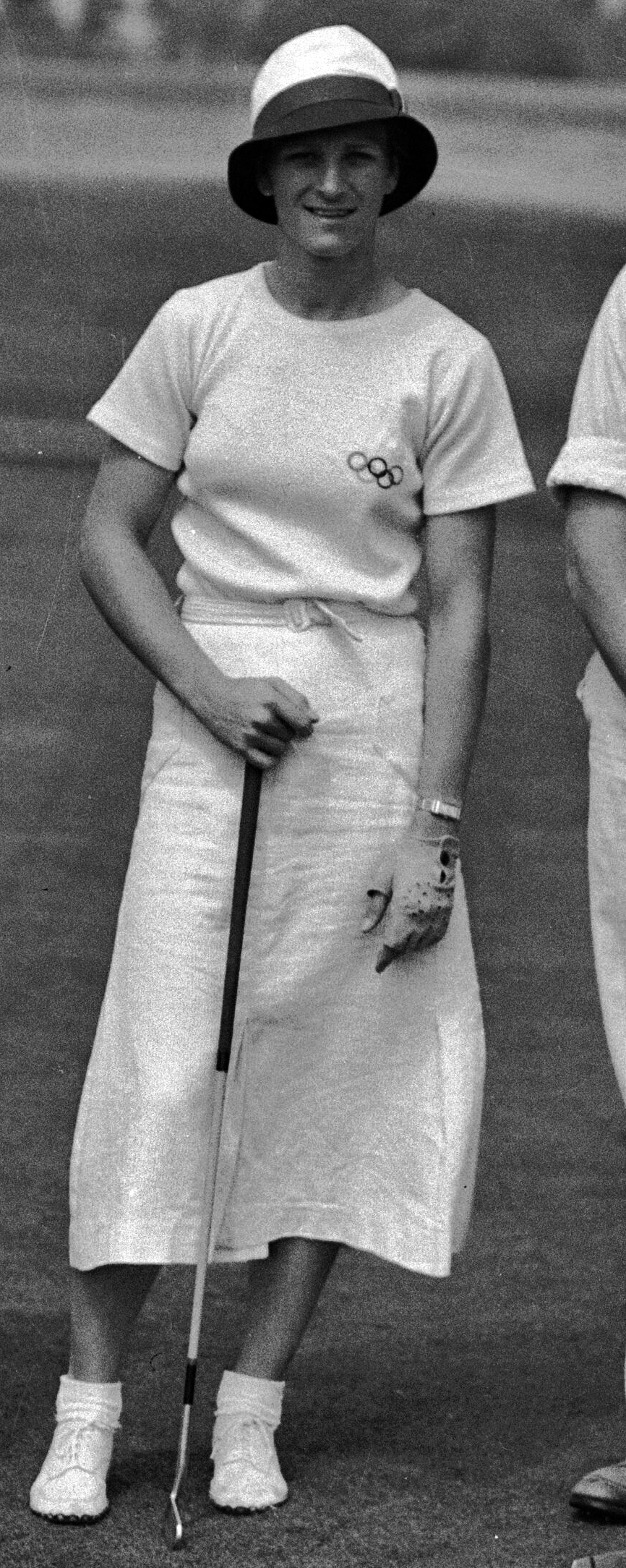
Babe Didrikson Zaharias in 1933

While Zaharias missed the cut in the 1938 PGA Tour event, later, as she became more experienced, she made the cut in every PGA Tour event she entered. In January 1945, Zaharias played in three PGA tournaments and made the initial cut in all three, becoming the first and only female to do so. She shot 76–76 to qualify for the Los Angeles Open. She then shot 76–81 to make the two-day cut in the tournament itself, but missed the three-day cut after carding a 79. She continued her cut streak at the Phoenix Open, where she shot 77-72-75-80, finishing in 33rd place. At the Tucson Open, she qualified by shooting 74-81 and then shot a 307 in the tournament and finished tied for 42nd. Unlike other female golfers competing in men's events, she got into the Los Angeles and Tucson Opens through 36-hole qualifiers, as opposed to a sponsor's exemption.

In 1948, she became the first woman to attempt to qualify for the U.S. Open, but her application was rejected by the USGA. They stated that the event was intended to be open to men only.

=== Baseball ===
In March 1934, Didrikson pitched a total of four innings in three Major League spring training exhibition games:

- On March 20 she gave up one walk and no hits in one inning for the Philadelphia Athletics against the Brooklyn Dodgers, getting out of the inning with a triple play.
- On March 22 she pitched the first inning for the St. Louis Cardinals against the Boston Red Sox. It was reported that "Under tutelage of Burleigh Grimes, Dizzy Dean, and others she has learned to stand on the rubber, wind up like a big leaguer and throw a rather fair curve." The Red Sox scored three runs against Didrikson in the inning before she got Boston third baseman Bucky Walters to fly out to future Hall of Famer Joe Medwick in left field to end the inning. She was relieved at the start of the second inning by Cardinal pitcher Bill Hallahan. 400 fans were in attendance.
- On March 25 she played for the Cleveland Indians against their Double-A farm team, the New Orleans Pelicans, pitching two scoreless innings and hitting two line drives, one fair and one foul.

Didrikson also spent time with the House of David barnstorming team and is still recognized as the world record holder for the farthest baseball throw by a woman at 296 feet.

=== Last years and death ===
Zaharias had her greatest year in 1950 when she completed the Grand Slam of the three women's majors of the day: the U.S. Open, the Titleholders Championship, and the Women's Western Open, a feat that made her the leader on the money list that year. Also that year, she reached 10 wins faster than any other LPGA golfer, doing so in one year and 20 days, a record that still stands (as do her records for reaching 20 and 30 wins, in two years and four months and five years and 22 days, respectively). She was the leading money-winner again in 1951, and in 1952 took another major with a Titleholders victory, but illness prevented her from playing a full schedule in 1952–53.

She was a close friend of fellow golfer Betty Dodd. According to Susan Cayleff's biography Babe, Dodd was quoted as saying, "I had such admiration for this fabulous person [Zaharias]. I loved her. I would have done anything for her." They met in a 1950 amateur golf tournament in Miami and became close almost immediately. Cayleff wrote, "As Didrikson's marriage grew increasingly troubled, she spent more time with Dodd. The women toured together on the golf circuit, and eventually Dodd moved in with Zaharias and Didrikson for the last six years of Didrikson's life." They never used the word "lesbian" to describe their relationship, but there is little doubt that their relationship was both sexual and romantic, and Zaharias has been described as the first lesbian gold medalist in Olympic athletics.

In 1953, Zaharias was diagnosed with colon cancer. After undergoing surgery, she made a comeback in 1954. She took the Vare Trophy for lowest scoring average, her only win of that trophy, and her 10th and final major with a U.S. Women's Open championship, one month after the surgery and while wearing a colostomy bag. With this win, she became the second-oldest woman to win a major LPGA championship tournament (behind Fay Crocker). Babe Zaharias now stands third to Crocker and Sherri Steinhauer. These wins made her the fastest player to reach 30 wins (five years and 22 days). In addition to continuing tournament play, Zaharias also served as the president of the LPGA from August 1952 to July 1955.

In 1955, Zaharias published her autobiography This Life I've Led. It is no longer in print but is available in many libraries.

Her colon cancer recurred in 1955. Despite her limited schedule of eight golfing events that season, Zaharias won her last two tournaments in competitive golf. On September 27, 1956, Zaharias died of her illness at the age of forty-five at the John Sealy Hospital in Galveston, Texas. At the time of her death, she was still a top-ranked female golfer. She and her husband had earlier established the Babe Zaharias Fund to support cancer clinics. She is buried at Forest Lawn Cemetery in her hometown of Beaumont, Texas.

During her final years, Zaharias became known not only for her athletic abilities but as a public advocate for cancer awareness, at a time when many Americans refused to seek diagnosis or treatment for suspected cancer. She used her fame to solicit donations for her cancer fund but also as a spokesperson for the American Cancer Society. Her work in this area was honored by US President Dwight Eisenhower on a visit to the White House.

== Legacy ==
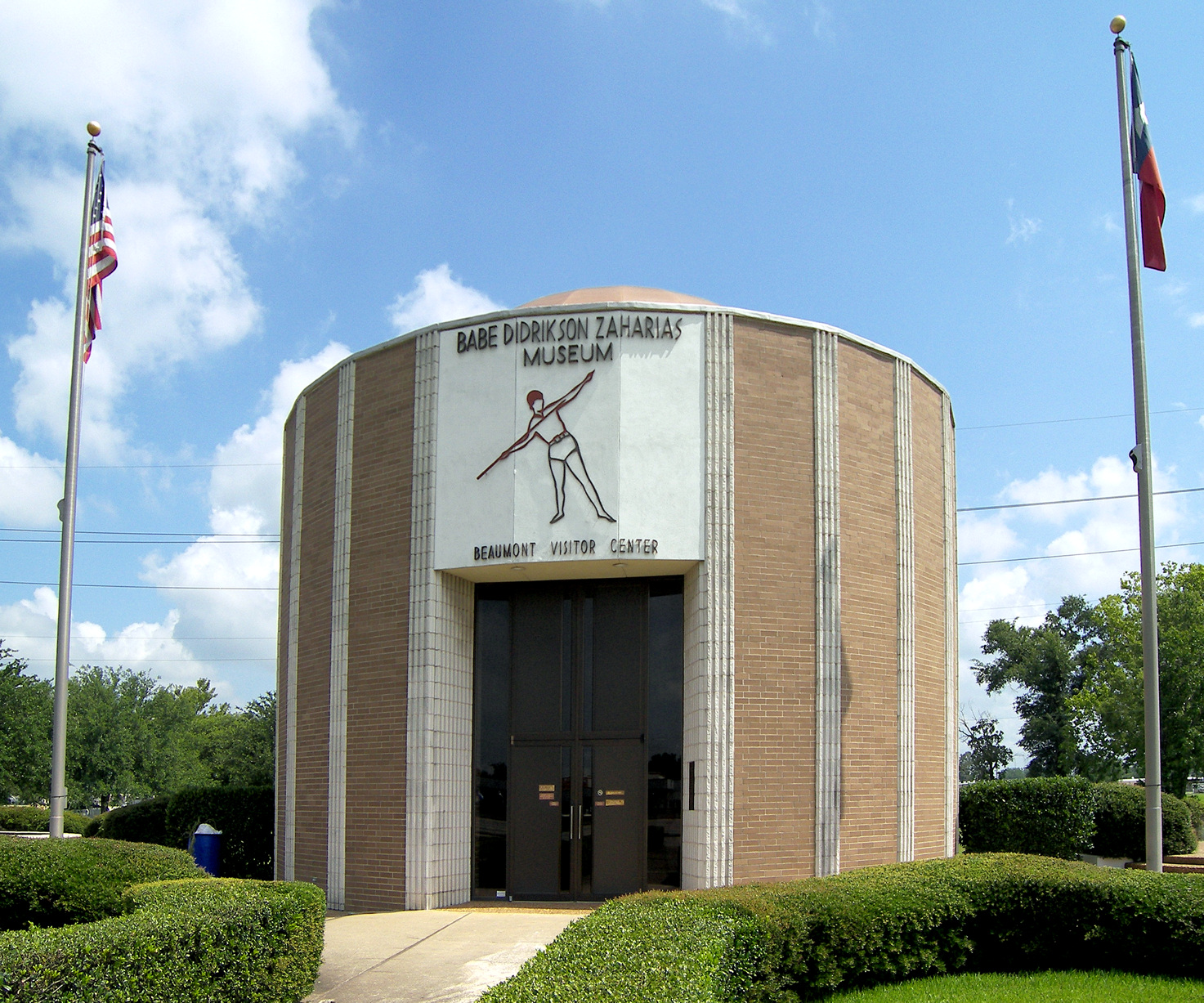
The Babe Didrikson Zaharias Museum in Beaumont is also one of the city's welcoming centers.

Zaharias broke the accepted models of femininity in her time, including the accepted models of female athleticism. Standing 5 ft 7 in (1.70 m) tall and weighing 115 lb (52 kg), Zaharias was physically strong and socially straightforward about her strength. Although a sports hero to many, she was also derided for her "manliness".

Zaharias has a museum dedicated to her in Beaumont, Texas: the Babe Didrikson Zaharias Museum. A golf tournament is held annually in Beaumont to honor her. Several golf courses are named after her. ESPN ranked her the 10th Greatest North American Athlete of the century, the highest-ranked woman on their list.

In 1950, the Associated Press voted Zaharias as the "Greatest Female Athlete of the First Half of the Century". In 1957, she posthumously received the Bob Jones Award, the highest honor given by the United States Golf Association in recognition of distinguished sportsmanship in golf. It was accepted by her husband George, four months after her death.

=== Halls of fame ===
Zaharias was inducted into the LPGA Hall of Fame in 1951 (now part of the World Golf Hall of Fame).

In 1964, Zaharias was posthumously inducted into the Florida Sports Hall of Fame.

In 1973, Zaharias, who had lived in the Denver area for most of the 1940s and early 1950s, became one of the three inductees in the inaugural class (joining Dave Hill and Babe Lind) of the Colorado Golf Hall of Fame.

In 1976, Zaharias was inducted into the National Women's Hall of Fame.

She was one of six initial inductees into the LPGA Hall of Fame at its inception in 1977.

In 1978, she was inducted into the Texas Golf Hall of Fame.

In 2008, Zaharias was inducted into the Colorado Women's Hall of Fame.

=== Contemporary impressions ===
It would be much better if she and her ilk stayed at home, got themselves prettied up and waited for the phone to ring.

— sportswriter Joe Williams, New York World-Telegram

Williams' remark typified the attitude of some toward women who did not fit the traditional ideals of femininity current in the first half of the 20th century. However, in the same time period, the Associated Press chose her as the "Female Athlete of the Year" six times for track & field and for golfing, and, in 1950, overwhelmingly voted for her as the "Greatest Female Athlete of the First Half of the Century". Aside from her impact on the women and girls of her time, she impressed seasoned sportswriters also:

She is beyond all belief until you see her perform...Then you finally understand that you are looking at the most flawless section of muscle harmony, of complete mental and physical coordination, the world of sport has ever seen.

— sportswriter Grantland Rice, quoted by ESPN

=== Modern-day ===
The Associated Press voted Zaharias the Woman Athlete of the 20th Century in 1999. In 2000, Sports Illustrated magazine also named her second on its list of the Greatest Female Athletes of All Time, behind the heptathlete Jackie Joyner-Kersee. She is also in the World Golf Hall of Fame. Zaharias is the highest-ranked woman, at No. 10, on ESPN's list of the 50 top athletes of the 20th century. In 2000, she was ranked as the 17th-greatest golfer, and the second-greatest woman player (after Mickey Wright) by Golf Digest magazine.

In 1981, the U.S. Postal Service issued an 18 cent stamp commemorating Zaharias.

In 2019 Time created 89 new covers to celebrate women of the year starting from 1920; it chose Zaharias for 1932.

She broke the mold of what a lady golfer was supposed to be. The ideal in the 20s and 30s was Joyce Wethered, a willowy Englishwoman with a picture-book swing that produced elegant shots but not especially long ones. Zaharias developed a grooved athletic swing reminiscent of Lee Trevino's, and she was so strong off the tee that a fellow Texan, the great golfer Byron Nelson, once said that he knew of only eight men who could outdrive her. "It's not enough just to swing at the ball," Babe said. "You've got to loosen your girdle and really let the ball have it."

— journalist Charles McGrath, New York Times

In 2014, Zaharias was inducted into the Legacy Walk, an outdoor public display that celebrates LGBTQ people.

She was inducted into the Texas Track and Field Coaches Hall of Fame, Class of 2016. On January 7, 2021, Zaharias was awarded the Presidential Medal of Freedom by President Donald J. Trump.

=== Babe Zaharias Golf Course ===
In 1974, the City of Tampa took over a golf course she had owned, renovated it, and reopened it, naming it the Babe Zaharias Golf Course. In 2023, a historical marker about Zaharias and the course was placed on the course by the Hillsborough County Historical Advisory Council and The Forest Hills Neighborhood Association. The course is also part of the Florida Historic Golf Trail.

=== California courses ===
In 1980, the Industry Hills Golf Club at Pacific Palms Resort in City of Industry, California built two courses, The Ike and The Zaharias. The courses were designed by William F. Bell (original design) and Casey O'Callaghan (renovation). In 2010, the courses together won the National Golf Course Owners Association's California Golf Course of the Year Award.

This 18-hole course is named for Babe Didrikson Zaharias, one of America 's most decorated all-around athletes... This par 71 features slope ratings ranging from 126 to 138, making the course worthy of the great athlete for which it is named.

— Industry Hills Golf Club at Pacific Palms Resort Website

=== In the media ===
- Dodge featured Babe Didrikson in advertisements for the 1933 Dodge "6" sedan.
- Zaharias appeared as a guest on the ABC reality show, The Comeback Story (1953–1954), explaining her attempts to battle colon cancer, which thereafter still claimed her life.
- In 1952, she appeared as herself in the Spencer Tracy-Katharine Hepburn film Pat and Mike.
- In 1975, Susan Clark portrayed Zaharias in a biographic TV movie titled Babe, for which Clark won an Emmy Award. Alex Karras played George Zaharias. Clark and Karras met while making the picture and later married.
- In 2006, the Arthur episode "World Girls" featured Francine buying a doll of Zaharias, which included a dossier about golf, after learning her involvement in professional golf and how she introduced women to the sport.
- In 2007, Carolyn Gage began work on Babe, a full-chorus, full-orchestra musical about Zaharias.
- In June 2011, Little, Brown published a major biography of Zaharias, Wonder Girl, by author Don Van Natta Jr.
- On August 26, 2014, her story was portrayed in a "Sport Heroes" episode of the Comedy Central series Drunk History; Didrikson Zaharias was played by Emily Deschanel.
- She is the sole character in the 2020 opera Par for the Course, written by composer Lisa Neher and librettist Kendra Preston Leonard. The opera depicts Zaharias's reaction to learning that she will not be allowed to play in the US Open.

== Amateur wins ==
Note: This list is incomplete.

- 1935 Texas Women's Amateur
- 1946 U.S. Women's Amateur, Women's Trans-Mississippi Amateur
- 1947 North and South Women's Amateur, British Ladies Amateur

== Professional wins ==
=== LPGA Tour wins (41) ===
- 1940 (1) **Women's Western Open** (as an amateur)
- 1944 (1) **Women's Western Open** (as an amateur)
- 1945 (1) **Women's Western Open** (as an amateur)
- 1947 (2) Tampa Open, **Titleholders Championship** (as an amateur)
- 1948 (3) All American Open, World Championship, **U.S. Women's Open**
- 1949 (2) World Championship, Eastern Open
- 1950 (8) **Titleholders Championship**, Pebble Beach Weathervane, Cleveland Weathervane, 144 Hole Weathervane, **Women's Western Open**, All American Open, World Championship, **U.S. Women's Open**
- 1951 (9) Ponte Verde Beach Women's Open, Tampa Women's Open, Lakewood Weathervane, Richmond Women's Open, Valley Open, Meridian Hills Weathervane, All American Open, World Championship, Women's Texas Open
- 1952 (5) Miami Weathervane, **Titleholders Championship**, Bakersfield Open (tied with Marlene Hagge, Betty Jameson and Betsy Rawls), Fresno Open, Women's Texas Open
- 1953 (2) Sarasota Open, Babe Zaharias Open
- 1954 (5) Serbin Open, Sarasota Open, Damon Runyon Cancer Fund Tournament, **U.S. Women's Open**, All American Open
- 1955 (2) Tampa Open, Peach Blossom Open

LPGA Majors are shown in bold.

=== Other wins ===
- 1940 Women's Texas Open
- 1945 Women's Texas Open
- 1946 All American Open, Women's Texas Open
- 1947 Hardscrabble Open
- 1951 Orlando Florida 2-Ball (with George Bolesta)
- 1952 Orlando Mixed (with Al Besselink)

== Major championships ==
=== Wins (10) ===
Year	Championship	Winning score	Margin	Runner-up
1940	Women's Western Open	5 & 4		(United States) Mrs. Russell Mann
1944	Women's Western Open	7 & 5		(United States) Dorothy Germain (a)
1945	Women's Western Open	4 & 2		(United States) Dorothy Germain (a)
1947	Titleholders Championship	+4 (78–81–71–74=304)	5 strokes	(United States) Dorothy Kirby (a)
1948	U.S. Women's Open	E (75–72–75–78=300)	8 strokes	(United States) Betty Hicks
1950	Titleholders Championship	+10 (72–78–73–75=298)	8 strokes	(United States) Claire Doran (a)
1950	Women's Western Open	5 & 3		(United States) Peggy Kirk
1950	U.S. Women's Open	−9 (75–76–70–70=291)	9 strokes	(United States) Betsy Rawls (a)
1952	Titleholders Championship	+11 (74–73–73–79=299)	7 strokes	(United States) Betsy Rawls
1954	U.S. Women's Open	+3 (72–71–73–75=291)	12 strokes	(United States) Betty Hicks

== See also ==
- List of golfers with most LPGA Tour wins
- List of golfers with most LPGA major championship wins
- List of multi-sport athletes
- List of multi-sport champions
- Annika Sörenstam
- Suzy Whaley
- Michelle Wie
- Brittany Lincicome

== Bibliography ==
- Cayleff, Susan E. (1996). Babe: The Life and Legend of Babe Didrikson Zaharias. University of Illinois Press. ISBN 978-0-252-06593-4.
- Klawans, Harold L. (1996). 'Why Michael Couldn't Hit and Other Tales of the Neurology of Sports. W.H. Freeman & Company. ISBN 978-0-7167-3001-9.
- Van Natta, Don Jr. (2011). Wonder Girl: The Magnificent Sporting Life of Babe Didrikson Zaharias. Little, Brown and Company. ISBN 978-0-316-05699-1.
- Zaharias, Babe Didrikson (1955). This Life I've Led: My Autobiography. New York A.S Barns & Co. ASIN B0018EAHXW.
