= 1933 Women's Western Open =

Golf tournament in Illinois, U.S.

Coordinates: 41°31′01.61″N 87°41′37.64″W

The 1933 Women's Western Open was a golf competition held at Olympia Fields Country Club in Olympia Fields, Illinois, a suburb of Chicago. It was the 4th edition of the Women's Western Open. June Beebe won the championship in match play competition by defeating Jane Weiller in the final match, 3 and 2.
