= 1932 Women's Western Open =

Golf tournament

The 1932 Women's Western Open was a golf competition held at Ozaukee Country Club in Mequon, Wisconsin, which was the third edition of the Women's Western Open. Jane Weiller won the championship in match play competition by defeating June Beebe in the final match, 5 and 4.
