= Northwestern Wildcats =

Intercollegiate sports teams of Northwestern University

- University: Northwestern University
- Nickname: Wildcats
- NCAA: Division I (FBS)
- Conference: Big Ten Conference (primary); Central Collegiate Fencing Conference (fencing)
- Athletic director: Mark Jackson
- Location: Evanston, Illinois
- Varsity teams: 21 (8 men's and 13 women's)
- Football stadium: Martin Stadium (temporary); Wrigley Field (selected games); New Ryan Field (beginning Fall 2026)
- Basketball arena: Welsh-Ryan Arena
- Colors: Purple and white
- Mascot: Willie the Wildcat
- Fight song: Go U Northwestern!
- Website: nusports.com
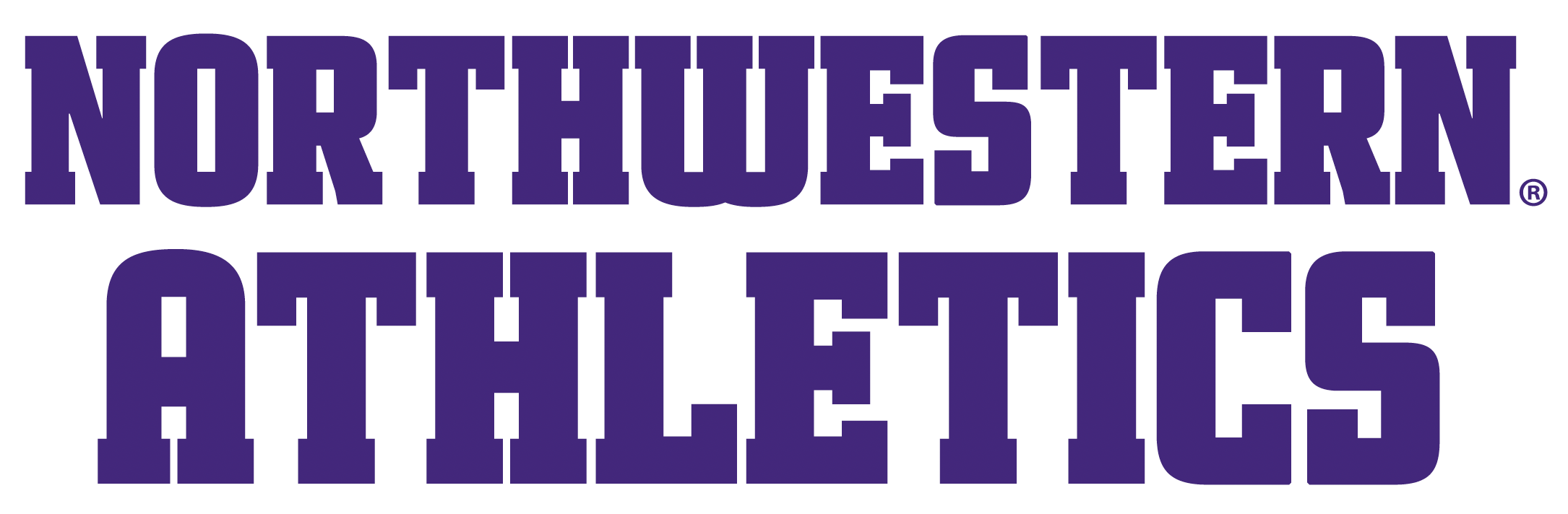

Big Ten logo in Northwestern's colors

The Northwestern Wildcats are the athletic teams that represent Northwestern University, located in Evanston, Illinois. Northwestern is a founding member of the Big Ten Conference and one of two private universities in the conference, the other being the University of Southern California. Northwestern has eight men's and eleven women's NCAA Division I sports teams and is marketed as "Chicago's Big Ten Team". The mascot is Willie the Wildcat.

== History ==
Northwestern is a charter member of the Big Ten Conference and was the only private institution in the conference after the University of Chicago left in 1946 until the University of Southern California joined in 2024. It is also by far the smallest, With approximately 8,000 undergraduate students. The next-smallest, Iowa, is almost three times as large.

Currently, Northwestern fields 21 intercollegiate athletic teams (8 men's and 13 women's) in addition to numerous club sports. Recent success by the Wildcats includes: Northwestern Football's bowl game victories (2016–2018, 2020, and 2023) and its 2018 and 2020 Big Ten West title; Women's Basketball winning the 2020 Big Ten regular season championship; Women's Lacrosse winning the 2019 and 2021 Big Ten tournament title, 2021 Big Ten Regular Season title, and 2023 national championship; Women's Field Hockey winning the 2021 NCAA tournament title and returning to the championship game in 2023; Softball earning the 2019 and 2022 NCAA Regional Championship in Evanston and reaching the 2022 Women's College World Series; Wrestling's Sebastian Rivera winning an individual Big Ten championship in 2019 and Ryan Deakin winning an individual NCAA championship in 2022; Fencing claiming multiple Midwest Fencing Conference championships in 2018, 2019 and 2021; Women's Tennis securing the 2018 Big Ten regular season crown; and Women's Diver Olivia Rosendahl collecting individual NCAA championships in both 2018 and 2019. Northwestern revived their dormant women’s track programs during winter and spring 2025 after a 38 year hiatus.

=== Mascot ===
The Northwestern Athletics' mascot is Willie the Wildcat. However, the team's first mascot was a live, caged bear cub from the Lincoln Park Zoo named Furpaw. In fall 1923, Furpaw was driven to the playing field to greet the fans before each game. After a losing season, the team decided that Furpaw was the harbinger of bad luck and Willie made his debut ten years later in 1933. Willie initially debuted as a logo, coming to life later in 1947, when members of the Alpha Delta fraternity dressed up as him during the Homecoming parade. Now, Willie attends at least one event of each varsity sport throughout the year and dons replica uniforms whenever possible.

=== Origin of the name ===
Northwestern's athletic teams are nicknamed the Wildcats. Before 1924, they were known as "The Purple" and unofficially as "The Fighting Methodists." The name Wildcats was bestowed upon the university in 1924 by Wallace Abbey, a writer for the Chicago Daily Tribune who wrote that even in a loss to the University of Chicago, "Football players had not come down from Evanston; wildcats would be a name better suited to Coach Glenn Thistletwaite's boys." The team was also referred to in the article as "a Purple wall of wildcats." The name was so popular that university board members made "Wildcats" the official nickname just months later. In 1972, the student body voted to change the official nickname from "Wildcats" to "Purple Haze" but the new name never stuck.

=== Traditions ===
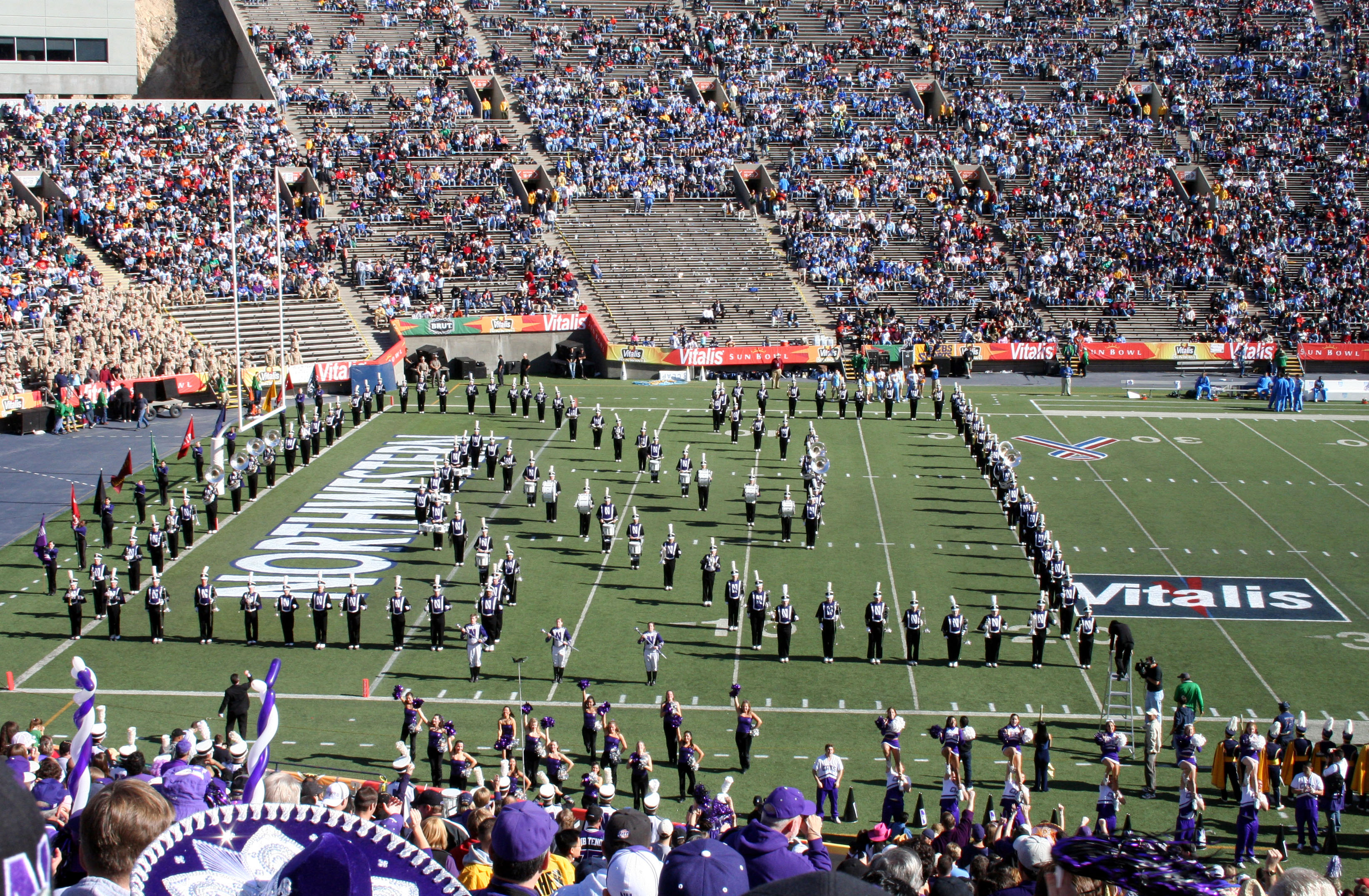
The Northwestern University "Wildcat" Marching Band forms the "Sculpted N" and performs "Go U Northwestern!" to close its pregame performance at the 2005 Sun Bowl under the direction of Daniel J. Farris.

The Northwestern Wildcats have several traditions relating to its athletics teams including the official chant, "Go U! NU!” and the Wildcats' fight song, "Go U! Northwestern!” A secondary fight song is "Rise Northwestern (Push on Song),” the final 4-measure tag (ending with a shouted "Go 'Cats!”) of which is often played after first downs. The alma mater is played by the Marching Band and sung by fans, students, and the team after each game. Victories by the football team are celebrated by lighting the face of the clock tower on south campus in Northwestern purple.

In addition, Northwestern Football honors former head coach Randy Walker with a pregame "Walk with Us" event before each home football game where the band, cheerleaders, and fans greet the team as they arrive to Ryan Field and head to the locker room. Additionally, the Northwestern Wildcats share an intrastate rivalry with the Illinois Fighting Illini and its football programs play for the Land of Lincoln Trophy after retiring the Sweet Sioux Tomahawk Trophy in 2008.

== Controversies ==
In 1998, two former Northwestern basketball players, Kenneth Dion Lee and Dewey Williams, were charged and convicted for sports bribery. The players were part of a gambling ring and received money to fix three games against other Big 10 schools during the 1995 season. The football team became embroiled in a different betting scandal later that year when federal prosecutors indicted four former players for perjury related to betting on their own games. In August 2001, Rashidi Wheeler, a senior safety, collapsed and died during practice from an asthma attack. An autopsy revealed that he had ephedrine, a stimulant banned by the NCAA, in his system which prompted Northwestern to investigate the prevalence of stimulants and other banned substances across all of its athletic programs.

In May 2006 the website BadJocks.com republished photos a reader had found on Webshots of the women's soccer team hazing its freshmen. The whole team was suspended for a time as a result. In the wake of the incident, head coach Jenny Haigh resigned and was replaced by Stephanie Erickson, the school's all-time leader in goals and points.

On July 7, 2023, Northwestern University announced that football head coach Pat Fitzgerald would be put on a two-week suspension after an independent investigation into hazing allegations revealed that a whistleblower's claims "were largely supported by evidence." Fitzgerald denied knowing about the hazing and began his two-week, without-pay suspension on July 7. The investigation was conducted by Washington, D.C. law firm Arent Fox Schiff and led by Maggie Hickey, a former Illinois inspector general. The next day, The Daily Northwestern reported that hazing allegations "involved coerced sexual acts," and that "Fitzgerald may have known that the hazing took place." The Daily Northwestern reported on July 10 that Northwestern's football team had a "culture enabling racism." Following The Daily's reporting, Northwestern University president Michael H. Schill wrote in a letter to the community that he "failed to sufficiently consider [Fitzgerald's] failure in levying a sanction." On July 10, Fitzgerald was fired.

On July 24, 2023, it was revealed that hazing had taken place in 2021 within the volleyball program and that the school had covered it up. Head coach Shane Davis was quietly suspended and put on leave throughout the course of the investigation. Northwestern would continue to employ Davis through the 2023 season before firing him after the season ended.

In July 2023, Northwestern fired the baseball head coach, Jim Foster, after one season due to engaging in bullying and abusive behavior.

== Athletics Department ==
=== Leadership ===
Northwestern Athletics, also known as the Northwestern University Department of Athletics and Recreation, was long led by Combe Family Vice President for Athletics and Recreation, Dr. James J. (Jim) Phillips. Phillips became Northwestern's 21st director of intercollegiate athletics and recreation in April 2008. Phillips has earned several awards and appointments including the National Association of Collegiate Directors of Athletics (NACDA) Under Armour Athletic Director of the Year in both 2012 and 2016, the 2018 Sports Business Journal Athletic Director of the Year, and Vice Chair of the 2020–21 NCAA Men's Basketball Selection Committee, expected to chair the committee in the following year. Phillips leads the department with focus on providing student-athletes with a "world-class experience" that enables them to thrive academically, socially, and athletically.

Under Phillips' leadership, Northwestern student-athletes have achieved impressive academic feats. Northwestern scored a 98-percent in the latest Graduation Success Rate (GSR), a figure which led all FBS schools for the second consecutive year. The Wildcats have scored a 96-percent or higher in every year that GSR data has been released, finishing in the top four among FBS schools all 15 years. Additionally, Phillips oversaw the creation of the department's NU for Life program, providing student-athletes with professional development opportunities and resources, as well as the department's first-ever community relations position, dedicated to connecting the department with the community. Moreover, Northwestern Athletics launched the ongoing "Chicago's Big Ten Team" campaign and the first master facility plan study with Phillips at the helm.

Phillips has a bachelor's degree from the University of Illinois, a master's degree in education from Arizona State University, and a PhD in educational administration from the University of Tennessee.

In January 2021, Phillips left Northwestern to become the commissioner of the Atlantic Coast Conference. Mike Polisky, Northwestern's deputy athletic director for external affairs since 2010, was promoted to replace Phillips. On May 12, 2021, amidst much controversy and protest from students and other members of the Northwestern community, Polisky stepped down. Schapiro named Northwestern linguistics professor Robert Gundlach as interim AD.

=== Under Armour Partnership ===
In December 2011, Northwestern University announced a multiyear partnership with Under Armour as its official outfitter of the university's athletic program. Under Armour began outfitting the Northwestern Wildcats in 2012–13 and the partnership marked Under Armour's first with a Big Ten team. Now, Northwestern is one of three Big Ten teams sporting Under Armour gear. Since the partnership began, the Wildcats have introduced a number of exclusive uniform designs, including its hallmark Gothic uniforms for several sports (debuted in 2014 with football), its Gothic Ice line in 2020 for women's lacrosse and softball, as well as the "By the Players" uniforms for the men's basketball program to debut on Senior Day each season. In addition, the football program's CFB 150th Anniversary uniforms, worn in 2019, earned the first place spot on Uniswag's weekly countdown that features the Top 10 college football uniforms each week.

=== Chicago's Big Ten Team ===
In 2010, Northwestern Athletics launched its first-ever wide-ranging marketing campaign in department history. The ongoing "Chicago's Big Ten Team" campaign is intended to increase the Wildcats' presence around Chicago and raise local and regional awareness of Northwestern University. The Northwestern Wildcats reside in the city of Evanston and have a campus in Chicago along Lake Michigan. Northwestern remains the only Division I FBS institution in the Chicago area.

Over the last several years, the Northwestern Wildcats have increased their presence in the Chicago area through relationships with Chicago sports teams and venues. Under Phillips' direction, Northwestern sports programs have hosted games at U.S. Cellular Field (home of the Chicago White Sox) and Wrigley Field (home of the Chicago Cubs), in addition to partnering with the White Sox, Cubs, Blackhawks, and Arlington Park to host Northwestern-themed promotional days throughout the year.

=== The Foundation ===
Northwestern Athletics' Studio N debuted The Foundation in 2015. It includes "exclusive access" inside team meetings and road trips in addition to hearing from the coaches and players on the sidelines and in the locker room. The Foundation won the Chicago/Midwest Regional Emmy Award for Outstanding Achievement in Sports Programs – Program Series in December 2017 and has earned multiple NACDA/SVG College Sports Video awards.

"The Foundation: Expect Victory" was an eight-episode series that reviewed Northwestern Football's run to the 1995 Big Ten Championship and Rose Bowl game. The series aired on Wednesdays during fall 2020 on NBC Sports Chicago and each episode was released online after each airing.

== Sports sponsored ==
Men's sports	Women's sports
Baseball	Basketball
Basketball	Cross country
Football	Fencing
Golf	Field hockey
Soccer	Golf
Swimming & diving	Lacrosse
Tennis	Soccer
Wrestling	Softball
Swimming & diving
	Tennis
	Track and field
	Volleyball

=== Football ===
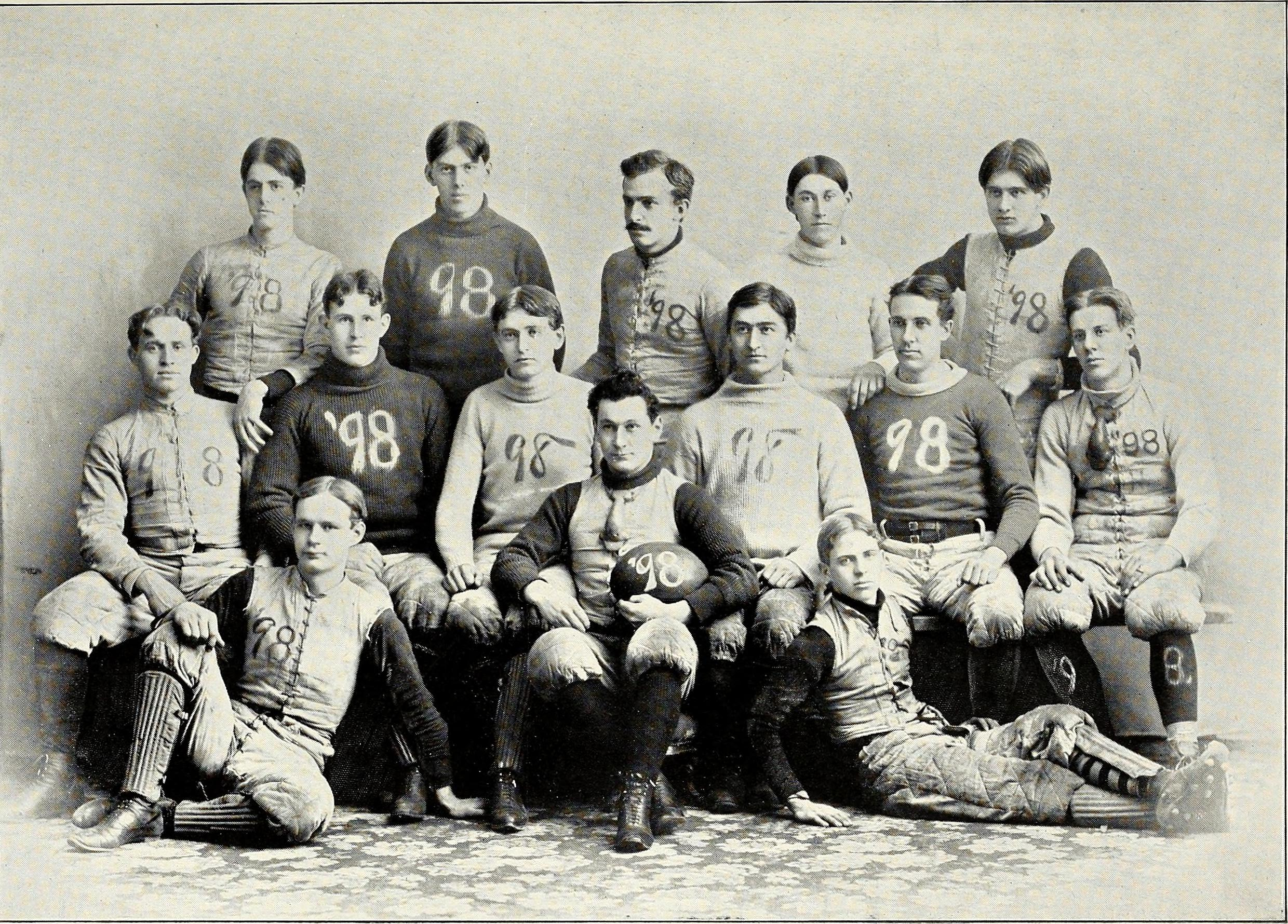
1896 Northwestern team

The Northwestern Wildcats football team has evidence of organization as early as 1876, but evidence confirms that Northwestern football was played in 1882 as a group of Northwestern men played a "football heat" against a group of Lake Forest men. The Wildcats have since achieved an all-time high rank of No. 1 during the 1936 and 1962 seasons, which has thus far not been duplicated. The team plays home games at Ryan Field in Evanston, Illinois. Northwestern Football has played in a total of 16 bowl games, including 10 appearances in just 10 seasons between 2008 and 2020. The Wildcats won three consecutive bowl games in 2016–18. Despite the Wildcats challenging season in 2019, the 2020 season marked their most recent seasons of success. In 2020, the Wildcats were Big Ten West Champions and bowl game champions. In addition, defensive Coordinator, Mike Hankwitz, who has been with Northwestern Football since 2008, received his 400 career win on January 1, 2021. Perhaps the most memorable Northwestern Football season was in 1995 as the Wildcats won the Big Ten Championship and saw their first Rose Bowl berth in nearly 50 years. Despite recent success, the Wildcats still hold the record for the longest losing streak in Division I-A football with 34 consecutive losses between 1979 and 1982.

Following the sudden death of football coach Randy Walker in 2006, 31-year-old and former All-American Northwestern linebacker Pat Fitzgerald assumed the position becoming the youngest Division I FBS coach at the time. The Wildcats earned their first-ever Big Ten West title and berth in the Big Ten Championship game in 2018. Fitzgerald was named the consensus Big Ten Coach of the Year and a finalist for the 2018 Dodd Trophy that season. Most recently, Fitzgerald earned the 2020 Dodd Trophy Coach of the Year. Fitzgerald was fired as head coach on July 10, 2023, following a hazing scandal. He was replaced by David Braun, who was originally hired as Northwestern's defensive coordinator in January 2023, and subsequently interim-head coach in July 2023. Braun was officially introduced as head coach on November 15, 2023, after snapping a 14-game road game losing streak at Wisconsin. Braun came from North Dakota State University, where he served in the same position for four seasons, leading the Bison to two FCS National Championships.

Former Wildcats active in the National Football League going into the 2020 season include Ibraheim Campbell, Austin Carr, Garrett Dickerson, Joe Gaziano, Nate Hall, Blake Hance, Montre Hartage, Justin Jackson, Joe Jones, Tyler Lancaster, Dean Lowry, Sherrick McManis, Ifeadi Odenigbo, Trevor Siemian, Clayton Thorson, Dan Vitale, and Anthony Walker Jr.

=== Men's basketball ===
The Wildcats men's basketball team is under the direction of Sullivan-Ubben Head Men's Basketball Coach Chris Collins, a role that he's been in since 2013. Collins led the Wildcats to heights never before reached during the 2016–17 season when the program saw a school record 24 wins and its first NCAA tournament berth and victory in program history. Collins was named as one of four finalists for the Naismith Men's Coach of the Year award in 2017.

The Wildcats single national championship is from 1931, retro-picked by the Helms Athletic Foundation and, later, by the Premo-Porrett Power Poll. Since then, the Wildcats have played in the National Invitation Tournament seven times, most recently in 2012. The men's basketball program was the first to open the renovated Welsh-Ryan Arena on November 2, 2018, in an exhibition game against McKendree. The state-of-the-art facility was built to be the most accessible arena in college athletics and seats 7,039. The team is cheered on by the Wildside student section.

=== Women's basketball ===
The Northwestern women's basketball team is led by Joe McKeown (pronounced Mick-Q-ann), a role that he's been in since 2008. Most recently, McKeown led his Wildcats team to a regular season Big Ten title in the 2019–20 season, tying the program's best 26 wins in a single season. McKeown earned his 700th career win on December 20, 2019. McKeown previously coached at George Washington. He led the Colonials to 14 regular season or postseason Atlantic 10 titles. McKeown is a native of Philadelphia and was inducted into the Father Judge High School Hall of Fame in 1999.

In 2017, the Wildcats saw its highest draft pick in program history with Nia Coffey, selected fifth overall by the San Antonio Stars. The first player drafted in program history was Amy Jaeschke in 2011, selected 27th overall by the Chicago Sky.

=== Women's lacrosse ===
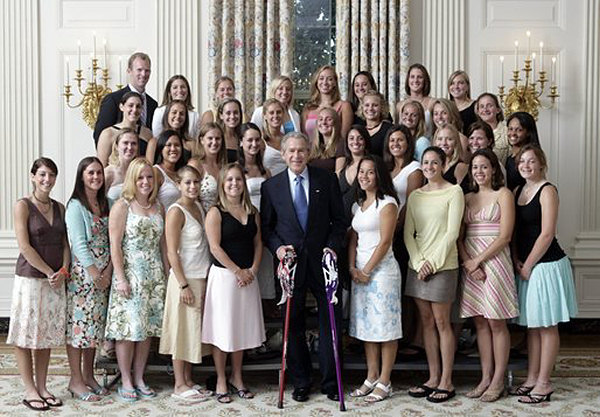
Women's lacrosse team with President George Bush at the White House, 2007

Northwestern lacrosse has won the national championship in women's lacrosse five straight times, from 2005 to 2009, and then again in 2011 and 2012, giving them 7 championships in 8 years. In 2007, the team joined Maryland as the only other school to three-peat. The run started in 2005, when the team enjoyed a perfect season and defeated many long-established east-coast schools after only five years as a varsity sport to capture the school's first national championship since 1941. In doing so, it became the westernmost institution to ever win the title. Soon after, the team made national news when members appeared in a White House photo with President Bush wearing thong sandals, or flip-flops, dubbed as the "White House flip-flop flap." The 2009 season also was an undefeated run. In their five consecutive championship seasons, the Wildcats have a 106–3 record. The Wildcats are led by head coach Kelly Amonte-Hiller, a role that she's been in since 2002. Most recently, the Wildcats won their first ever Big Ten Championship in 2019, won their first ever Big Ten regular season championship in 2021, and repeated as national champions for an 8th time in 2023. The Wildcats won their 9th national championship in 2026, becoming the first team since 1986 to win the national championship on home turf.

=== Fencing ===
The Northwestern Fencing program competes in the Central Collegiate Conference and has a tenured history of success. Zach Moss is the programs head coach, a role that he's been in since 2016. Following a historic 2017–18 season, Moss was named the Midwest Fencing Conference Coach of the Year as the Wildcats captured their fifth-ever conference championship and finished with three All-Americans at the NCAA Championships. Additionally, the team set the program record for most wins in a season with 47 and the program record for longest win streak at 25. The 2018–19 season saw more milestones for the Wildcats including a 39–5 record, an 11th-place finish at the NCAA Championships, and a second consecutive conference championship. The Wildcats achieved the highest ranking in program history during the season at second in the country and amassed 39 victories at the conference championships.

=== Field hockey ===
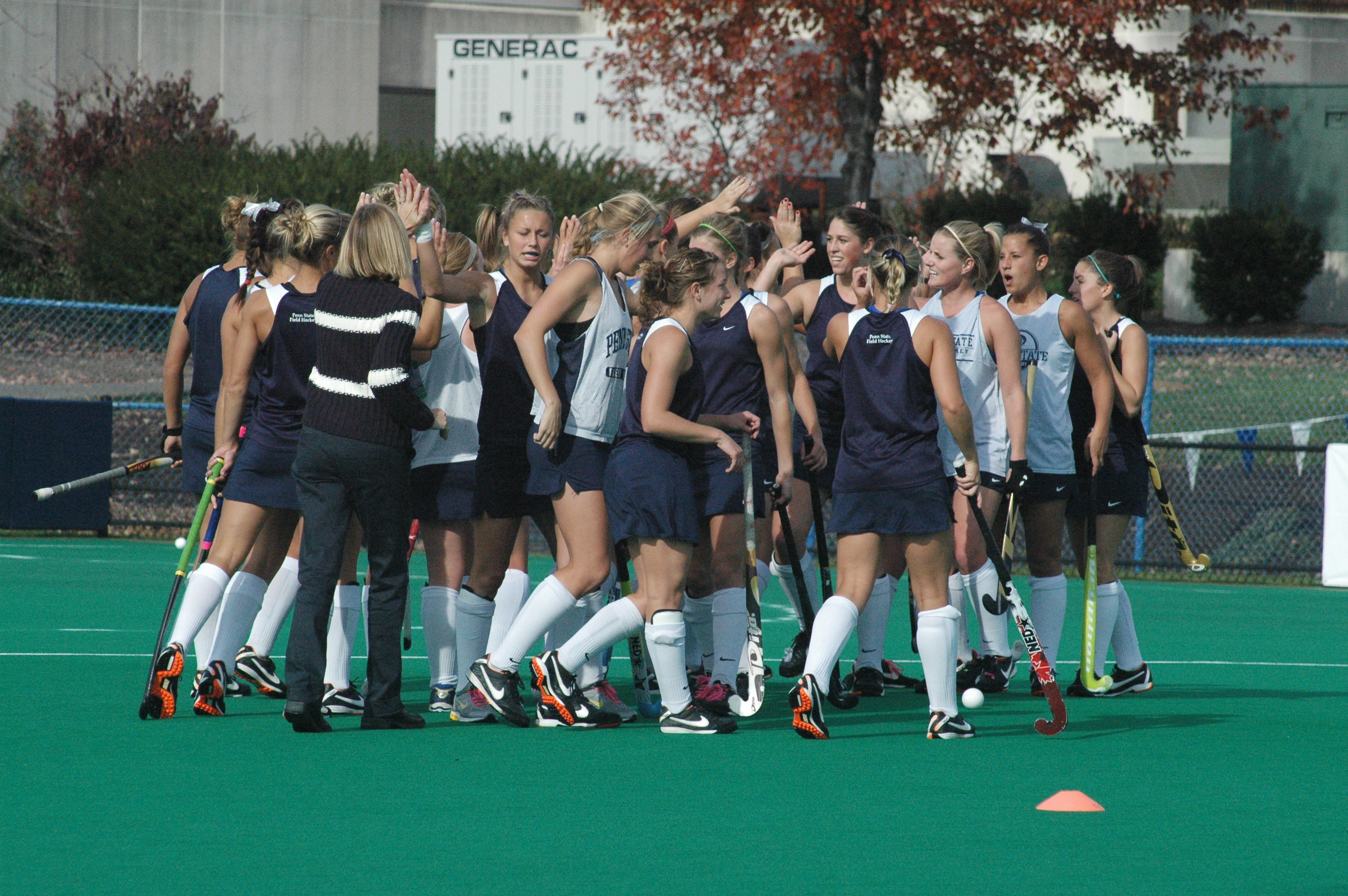
Northwestern players in a match v Penn State in 2011

The Northwestern Field Hockey team plays its home games at Lakeside Field, adjacent to Lanny and Sharon Martin Stadium on the lakefront. The Wildcats are led by head coach Tracey Fuchs, a role that she's been in since 2009. Fuchs has led the Wildcats to two Big Ten titles and three NCAA tournament appearances. Under Fuchs' direction, the Wildcats have posted winning seasons in 10 of her 11 seasons.

The Northwestern Wildcats field hockey team has gathered 6 regular season Big Ten titles and 1 tournament title in addition to 14 NCAA tournament appearances. In 2021, the team won the NCAA tournament, followed by championship game appearance in 2022 and 2023. The team won their second NCAA tournament Championship in 2024 and their third in 2025.

=== Wrestling ===
The Northwestern Wildcats wrestling program hosts home matches in Welsh-Ryan Arena and practices in the Ken Kraft Wrestling Room, located in Anderson Hall. The Wildcats are led by Matt Storniolo, a role that he's been in since 2016. The Wildcats have had 40 Big Ten individual champions in addition to 10 NCAA individual champions and 75+ All-Americans.

=== Golf ===
The men's golf team has won nine Big Ten Conference championships: 1925, 1937, 1939, 1948, 1999, 2000, 2001, 2006, 2024. They have twice placed second in the NCAA Championships: 1939, 1945. Luke Donald won the NCAA Individual Championship in 1999. He was Big Ten Conference Player of the year in 1999, and David Merkow was named the same in 2006. Donald was ranked number 1 in the Official World Golf Ranking for 56 weeks in 2011 and 2012. The four best career stroke averages in school history are held by Luke Donald, Tom Johnson, Jess Daley, and David Lipsky.

The women's golf team won the 2025 NCAA Division I championship. Jane Weiller played golf for the school. In 1946 and 1957, Phyllis Otto and Meriam Bailey, respectively, won the women's individual intercollegiate golf championship (an event conducted by the Division of Girls' and Women's Sports (DGWS) – which later evolved into the current NCAA women's golf championship).

=== Soccer ===
The men's and women's soccer teams play home games at Lanny and Sharon Martin Stadium, opened in March 2016 and named to honor the generosity and leadership of Trustee J. Landis Martin and Sharon Martin. The stadium is also home to the lacrosse program. The men's soccer program is currently led by Tim Lenahan, a role that he's been in since 2001. Lenahan surpassed a career milestone of 300 career wins on September 24, 2019, with a come-from-behind overtime victory over the UIC Flames. Lenahan is the winningest coach in Northwestern Men's Soccer history and is one of only two active Big Ten coaches with more than 300 wins. The men's soccer program has won two regular season Big Ten titles (2011, 2012) and 1 Big Ten tournament title (2011). Tyler Miller is the program's only professional Wildcat, currently playing with Minnesota United as goalkeeper.

The women's soccer program is led by Michael Moynihan, a role that he's been in since 2009. The program has 1 regular season Big Ten title (2016) and six NCAA tournament appearances, including four in the last five seasons. Three Wildcats were drafted in the 2019 NWSL College Draft: Kayla Sharples (Chicago Red Stars), Marisa Viggiano (Orlando Pride), and Hannah Davison (Chicago Red Stars).

=== Softball ===
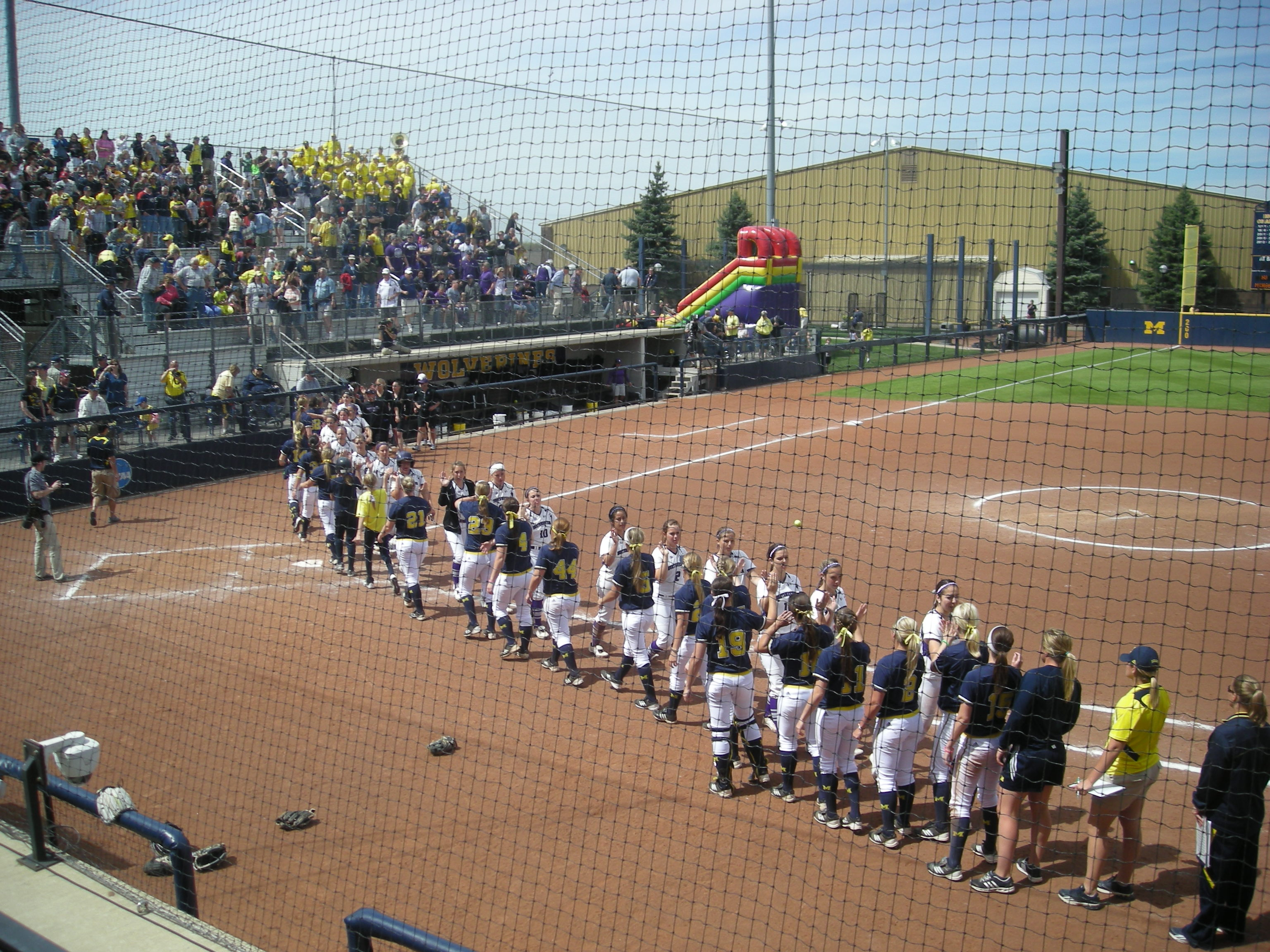
Northwestern v Michigan game in 2013

The Northwestern softball program is led by head coach Kate Drohan, a role that she's been in since 2002. Kate Drohan leads the Wildcats with her twin sister, Caryl Drohan, the program's associate head coach. After 19 seasons, Kate Drohan's career record includes a five-year stretch from 2005 to 2009 in which Northwestern compiled a record of 215–77, reached the Super Regional round of the NCAA tournament four times, and became the first private school in NCAA history to advance to the WCWS semifinals in consecutive years. Overall, Northwestern under Drohan has made 13 NCAA tournament appearances and has claimed five NCAA Regional titles, including its most recent in 2019 as the Wildcats hosted the Evanston Regional for the first time in 11 years. Drohan was named Big Ten Coach of the Year for the third time in her career in 2019 after leading the Wildcats to a 47–13 overall record, 21–2 in Big Ten play, collecting the most conference wins in program history and the program's longest winning streak since 1985 of 20 games. Drohan earned her 600th career win on April 9, 2019, with a 3–1 victory over Notre Dame. Most recently on March 27, 2021, the Drohans twin coaches became Northwestern softball's all-time win leaders with their 641st victory against Wisconsin.

The Northwestern softball program began in 1976 and currently competes at Sharon J. Drysdale Field, previously known as Anderson Field. The ballpark was renamed for NFCA Hall of Fame mentor Sharon J. Drysdale upon her retirement in 2001. Drysdale served as the Wildcats' head coach for 23 seasons and amassed a 640–512–3 record.

=== Swimming and diving ===
Northwestern a swimming and diving team that competes in men's and women's NCAA Division I competition.

=== Tennis ===
The women's and men's tennis programs compete indoors at Combe Tennis Center within the Henry Crown Sports Pavilion and outdoors at the Vandy Christie Tennis Center located along Sheridan Road. Northwestern Tennis matches are free to attend and typically held in the spring. The women's tennis program is led by head coach Claire Pollard, a role that she's been in since 1999. Pollard has transformed the program into a national powerhouse. Pollard has led the Wildcats to the NCAA tournament 21 consecutive times, the fifth-longest streak by an active head coach at the same program. The Wildcats have earned 15 Big Ten regular season titles and 17 Big Ten tournament titles, including a string of 16-straight conference titles through 2014. Northwestern has also had 2 NCAA doubles championships in 1987 and 2006.

Head coach Arvid Swan currently leads the Wildcats men's tennis program. Swan guided Northwestern to six consecutive NCAA appearances, beginning in 2009, and the program claims 9 Big Ten titles as well as 16 NCAA appearances.

=== Baseball ===
The Northwestern baseball team first competed in 1888, and has been active continuously since 1894 except for periods during World War I and World War II. Since 1943, Rocky Miller Park has been the home stadium to the team. The program has made one NCAA tournament appearance, in 1957.

=== Cross country ===
The Northwestern Cross Country only has a women's program. This team is led by recently joined head coach, Jill Miller. Miller attended Wake Forest University and was a four-time NCAA Cross Country Championships qualifier and was part of the program's first Atlantic Coach Conference title in 2002.

=== Women's volleyball ===
The Northwestern Volleyball program is coached by Shane Davis, a role that he's been in since 2015. The program plays their home games at the renovated Welsh-Ryan Arena.

== Facilities ==
=== Lakefront Athletics and Recreation Complex ===
==== Walter Athletics Center ====
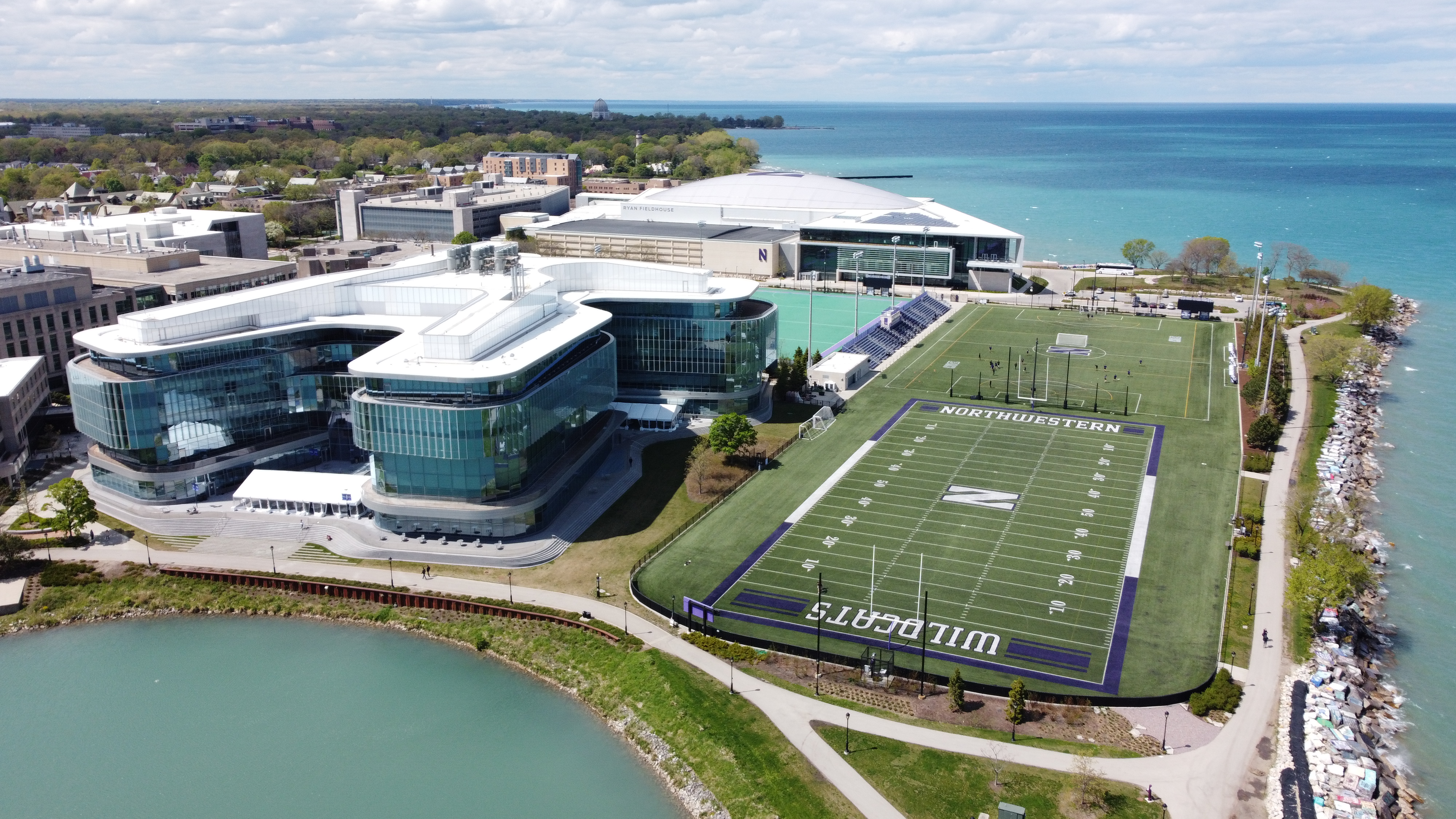
A portion of the Lakeshore at Northwestern University, with many athletic facilities in view, along with Kellogg Global Hub.

The Walter Athletics Center is the last in a series of new lakefront athletics and recreation facilities to be developed during We Will. The Campaign for Northwestern. Walter Athletics Center is a four-story, state-of-the-art development center located on the north end of the Evanston campus, structurally connected to Ryan Fieldhouse, the Henry Crown Sports Pavilion, and the North Parking Garage. The facility is named in honor of University Trustee Mark R. Walter and Kimbra D. Walter.

The transformational multi-purpose facility includes spaces for academic and professional development, nutrition and dining, sports performance, sports medicine and athletic training, and locker rooms for more than 500 Northwestern student-athletes. The Walter Athletics Center allows for plenty of natural light and has unobstructed views of Lake Michigan, the Chicago skyline, and other Northwestern facilities including Martin Stadium and Lakeside Field.

==== Ryan Fieldhouse and Wilson Field ====
Ryan Fieldhouse and Wilson Field opened in April 2018. Northwestern Lacrosse hosts a portion of its home schedule inside Ryan Fieldhouse, which is named for University Trustee Patrick G. Ryan and his wife, Shirley.

Ryan Fieldhouse's dome shape is based on football punting and kicking trajectories, with the peak of the dome reaching 87 feet above the surface of Wilson Field, named for Trustee Steve Wilson and his wife, Sue. Wilson Field is striped for NCAA regulation football, soccer, and lacrosse, with movable bleacher seating and an automated netting system designed to subdivide the space for use by multiple groups.

Ryan Fieldhouse also features a 44-foot-tall glass façade and several sports performance spaces for football and for Olympic sports.

==== Lanny and Sharon Martin Stadium ====
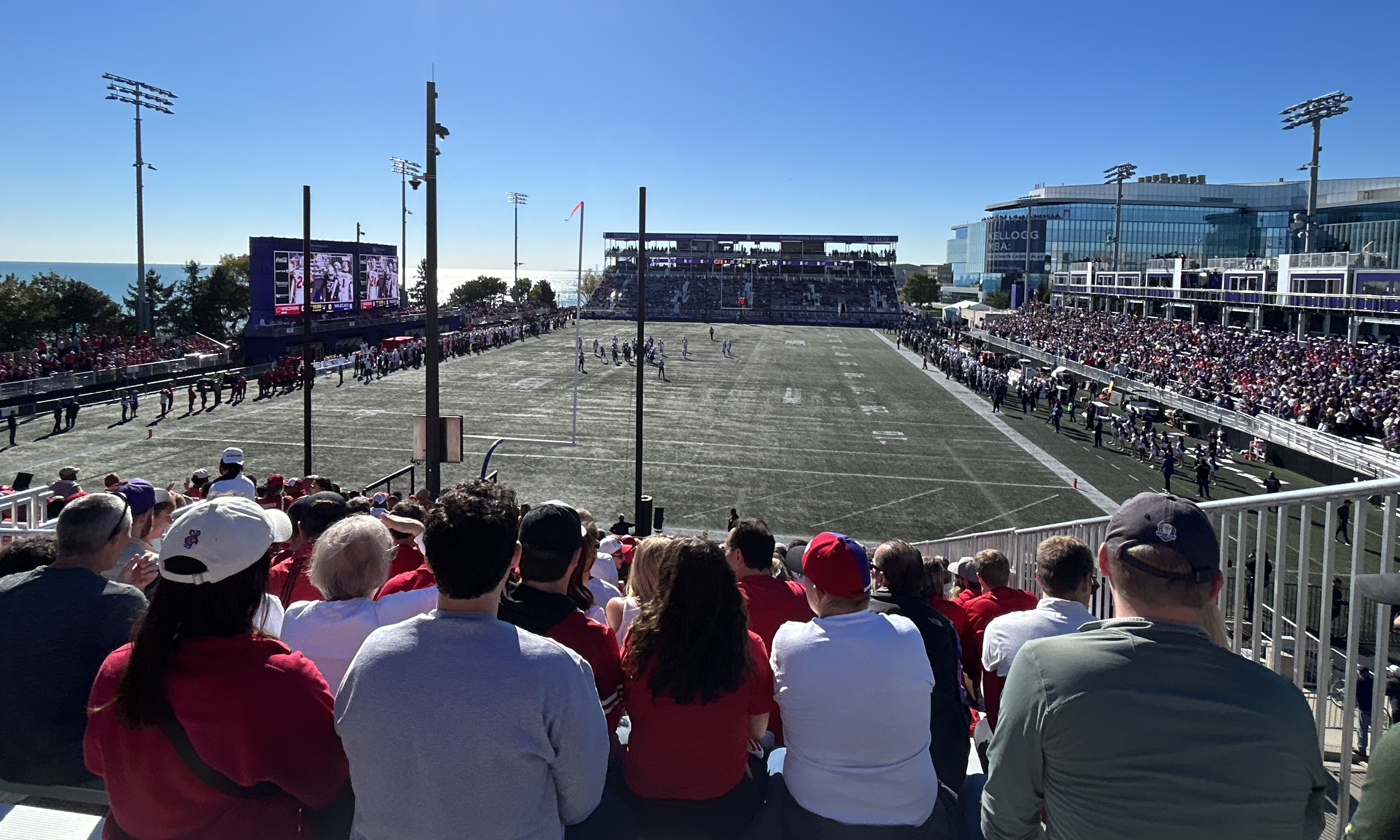
October 2024 game between the Wisconsin Badgers and the Wildcats at the temporary stadium at Martin Field

Lanny and Sharon Martin Stadium is an outdoor athletics and recreation facility, home of Northwestern soccer and lacrosse games. Martin Stadium underwent renovations and reopened on March 8, 2016, with a new turf field, lighting upgrades, and new video equipment. The facility is named to honor Trustee J. Landis Martin and Sharon Martin. The stadium has views of the Chicago skyline and is adjacent to Lakeside Field (to the west) and Hutcheson Field (to the south).

On April 10, 2024, the university announced that a temporary facility would be constructed as part of the complex to serve as the football team's home stadium for the 2024 and 2025 seasons while a replacement for Ryan Field is built. During its use as an interim football stadium, the facility is known for sponsorship reasons as Northwestern Medicine Field at Martin Stadium.

In 2025, the stadium was announced as the host of the 2026 NCAA Division I women's lacrosse semi-finals and national championship.

==== Chap and Ethel Hutcheson Field ====
Used primarily as an athletics and recreation practice field, Chap and Ethel Hutcheson Field is located just south of Martin Stadium and features a turf surface lined for NCAA regulation football.

==== Lakeside Field ====
Lakeside Field was constructed in 1997 and is "one of the premier venues for field hockey in the country". The stadium is located along the shore of Lake Michigan and sits to the west of Martin Stadium and to the north of the Kellogg Global Hub building. Lakeside Field underwent renovations in 2015 and is home to Northwestern Field Hockey.

==== Henry Crown Sports Pavilion ====
The Henry Crown Sports Pavilion is located along Campus Drive and is the main recreation facility on campus. The 95,000 square foot facility includes the Norris Aquatics Center and the Combe Tennis Center while also being structurally connected to Ryan Fieldhouse, the Walter Athletics Center, and the North Parking Garage. The recreation facility includes basketball, swimming, squash, racquetball, tennis, group exercise, cycling, weight lifting, and general cardio along with exercise-related activities and programs.

The Henry Crown Sports Pavilion was renovated in 2014 to include an additional 30,000 square feet, new studio space, and new exercise equipment. Later, three new basketball courts, a new three-lane jogging track, and new cardio machines were added in 2018.

===== Norris Aquatics Center =====
Inside the Henry Crown Sports Pavilion, the Norris Aquatics Center is home to Northwestern Swimming and Diving and is the venue for all home meets. The center, named for Dellora A. and Lester J. Norris, includes a 750,000-gallon, 50-meter-by-25-yard pool with movable walls that run on a track system, enabling the pool to be custom-fitted. The facility also includes a heat recycling system, an electronic scoreboard, and seating for 800 spectators.

===== Combe Tennis Center =====
Also within the Henry Crown Sports Pavilion, the Combe Tennis Center is home to Northwestern Tennis for indoor matches and includes six courts with electronic scoreboards and a main team scoreboard. The facility also includes spectator seating on a balcony overlooking the courts with unobstructed views of each match. In 2020, the athletics and recreation facility underwent renovations to its ceiling and lighting. The facility is named for former Northwestern tennis player Ivan Combe, who played from 1931 to 1933. The ITA named the Combe Tennis Center the 2002 Outstanding Facility.

=== Other facilities at the main Evanston campus ===
==== Patten Gymnasium ====
Patten Gymnasium is a historic, multi-purpose facility located on Northwestern's main campus that is home to the Northwestern Fencing program and Gleacher Golf Center.

===== Gleacher Golf Center =====
In November 2020, the Gleacher Golf Center opened as a complete renovation of the existing space inside Patten Gymnasium for the golf programs. Named for University Trustee Eric J. Gleacher and Paula Gleacher, the new, on-campus facility is one of the country's finest and includes a 5,400-square-foot short-game and putting area with raised ceilings, a state-of-the-art training area, an adjustable putting platform, new locker rooms, and a student-athlete lounge with a dedicated study area, full kitchen, and sports performance hub. The golf programs also practice at the Luke Donald Outdoor Practice Facility, unveiled in fall 2006.

==== Vandy Christie Tennis Center ====
The Vandy Christie Tennis Center was dedicated in October 1994 and includes 15 courts, a pro shop, and permanent seating for spectators. In 2013, the facility was enhanced with a main scoreboard, six individual scoreboards, and six 27-foot-long bleachers with chairbacks. The facility is home of Northwestern Tennis for outdoor matches and is located on Sheridan Road.

=== Ryan Field Campus facilities ===
==== Ryan Field ====
Ryan Field was the home of Northwestern Football from 1926 to 2023 and was located along Central Street. A new stadium on the site is expected to open in 2026.

==== Welsh-Ryan Arena ====
Welsh-Ryan Arena is home of Northwestern Men's and Women's Basketball, Wrestling, and Volleyball. The arena underwent renovations and opened in November 2018.

==== Trienens Performance Center ====
Along with renovations to Welsh-Ryan Arena, Northwestern Athletics redesigned the former home to Northwestern Football offices and practice space into what is now the Trienens Performance Center, a state-of-the-art practice facility for men's and women's basketball, volleyball, softball, and baseball. The building opened in November 2019 and includes a three-court fieldhouse, turf field and practice area, expanded performance nutrition hub, offices for men's and women's basketball staff, locker rooms, sports medicine and athletic training amenities, and a weight room. The new practice facility is named for University Trustee Howard J. Trienens. Complete virtual tour of the facility on YouTube.

==== Rocky and Berenice Miller Park ====
The home of Northwestern Baseball is Rocky and Berenice Miller Park, located along Ashland Avenue near Welsh-Ryan Arena and the West Lot.

==== Sharon J. Drysdale Field ====
The Wildcats softball team plays home games at Sharon J. Drysdale Field, located immediately east of Welsh-Ryan Arena. The facility, formerly known as Anderson Field, was renamed in 2011 to honor the legendary Sharon J. Drysdale who coached the Wildcats for 23 seasons. Drysdale Field features an intimate grandstand seating area in addition to seating located beyond right field. Most recently, the facility hosted the 2019 NCAA Evanston Regional for the first time in 11 years. The facility has earned a number of awards including the 2008 Stabilizer Solutions/NFCA Field Maintenance Award.

In 2006, the facility received new outfield turf and, in 2007, underwent final renovation phases that included sunken dugouts, permanent seating, a new game operations booth, and a plaza down the third-base line. Prior to the 2016 season, the field was again completely resurfaced with a new infield installation and fresh outfield turf. Drysdale Field and Ryan Field are the only two Northwestern Athletics competition facilities that feature natural grass.

==== Ken Kraft Wrestling Room ====
The Ken Kraft Wrestling Room is located on the bottom floor of Anderson Hall, located along Central Street northeast of Ryan Field, and is the primary practice facility for Northwestern Wrestling. The room features three 42’x42' mats as well as coaching offices and locker rooms. The practice facility is named in honor of Ken Kraft for his 48 years of involvement with the program. Kraft was a four-year member of the Wildcats wrestling squad and the program's head coach for 22 years. In 2004, Kraft retired after spending 51 years at Northwestern and was inducted into the Northwestern Athletic Hall of Fame in 2003.

== Rivalries ==
=== Illinois Fighting Illini ===
Northwestern's most prominent rivalry is with their Big Ten foe, the University of Illinois. The rivalry runs deep due to the schools' proximity to each other, history, and the Land of Lincoln Trophy between the football programs. The Land of Lincoln Trophy—popularly known as "The Hat" for its resemblance to and design modeled after Abraham Lincoln's hat—replaced the former football rivalry trophy, the Sweet Sioux Tomahawk Trophy. The Sweet Sioux was retired in 2008 after 64 seasons and the Land of Lincoln debuted the year following. Illinois leads the all-time series, 55–53–5, but Northwestern leads the Land of Lincoln Trophy series, 8–3, including victories in the last five consecutive meetings. The rivalry's first recorded game was in 1892 and resulted in a tie, 16-16.

=== Michigan Wolverines ===
In February 2021, the football programs at Northwestern and the University of Michigan announced a new rivalry trophy called the George Jewett Trophy. The game honors George Jewett, the first Black player in Big Ten history, who played football for both universities in the 1890s. The game is the first trophy in Football Bowl Subdivision history to be named for a Black player.

== Championships ==
=== Conference championships ===
- Football: 8 conference titles (1903, 1926, 1930, 1931, 1936, 1995, 1996, 2000), 2 division titles (2018, 2020)
- Baseball: 2 regular season (1940, 1957)
- Men's Basketball: 2 regular season (1931, 1933)
- Women's Basketball: 2 regular season (1990, 2020)
- Women's Fencing: 2 team Big Ten titles (1977, 1978), 6 team MFC titles (1999, 2000, 2001, 2016, 2018, 2019), 13 individual MFC titles
- MFC Weapon titles: 8 épée, 6 foil, 6 sabre, 1 Central Collegiate Fencing Conference (CCFC) title (2021)
- Field Hockey: 9 regular season ( 1983, 1984, 1985, 1988, 1994, 2013, 2023, 2024, 2025), 3 tournament (2014, 2023, 2025)
- Men's Golf: 8 team (1925, 1937, 1939, 1948, 1999, 2000, 2001, 2006), 13 medalists
- Women's Golf: 3 team (2013, 2015, 2016), 3 medalists
- Women's Lacrosse: 2 Big Ten Conference regular season (2021, 2023), 3 Big Ten tournaments (2019, 2021, 2023), 6 American Lacrosse Conference tournament (2007, 2008, 2009, 2010, 2011, 2013),
  8 American Lacrosse Conference regular season (2004, 2005, 2006, 2007, 2008, 2009, 2010, 2013)
- Men's Soccer: 2 regular season (2011, 2012), 1 tournament (2011)
- Women's Soccer: 1 regular season (2016)
- Softball: 9 regular season (1982, 1984, 1985, 1986, 1987, 2006, 2008, 2022, 2023)
- Men's Swimming and Diving: 10 team (1914, 1915, 1916, 1917, 1918, 1920, 1923, 1924, 1925, 1930), 111 individual, 84 individual swimming, 19 relay swimming, 8 diving
- Women's Swimming and Diving: 57 individual (38 individual swimming, 16 relay swimming, 2 diving)
- Men's Tennis: 9 team (1936, 1940, 1942, 1947, 1948, 1949, 1950, 1963, 1990)
- Women's Tennis: 15 regular season (1985, 1986, 1999, 2000, 2001, 2002, 2003, 2004, 2005, 2006, 2007, 2008, 2009, 2012, 2018) (most in the Big Ten), 17 tournament (1985, 1986, 1999, 2000, 2001, 2002, 2003, 2004, 2005, 2006, 2007, 2008, 2009, 2010, 2011, 2013, 2014) (most in the Big Ten)
- Women's Volleyball: 2 regular season (1983, 1984)
- Wrestling: 40 individual

=== National Championships ===
==== NCAA championships – team ====
- Men's (1)
  - Fencing (1): 1941
- Women's (14)
  - Golf (1): 2025
  - Lacrosse (9): 2005, 2006, 2007, 2008, 2009, 2011, 2012, 2023, 2026
  - Field Hockey (4): 2021, 2024, 2025, 2026

==== NCAA championships – individual ====
- Men's Fencing (now inactive): 1 (Edward McNamara in 1941)
- Men's Golf: 1 individual (Luke Donald in 1999)
- Men's Swimming and Diving: 31 individual/relay
- Women's Swimming and Diving: 2 (Olivia Rosendahl in 2017 and 2018)
- Women's Tennis: 2 doubles (1997, 2006)
- Men's Outdoor Track and Field (now inactive): 12
- Wrestling: 10

==== NCAA championship appearances ====
- Baseball: 1 appearance
- Men's Basketball: 3 appearances
- Women's Basketball: 7 appearances
- Women's Fencing: 30 appearances
- Field Hockey: 14 appearances
- Women's Golf: 8 appearances
- Women's Lacrosse: 20 appearances
- Men's Soccer: 9 appearances
- Women's Soccer: 6 appearances
- Women's Softball: 18 tournament appearances, 5 WCWS appearances
- Men's Swimming and Diving: 35 appearances
- Women's Swimming and Diving: 27 appearances
- Men's Tennis: 16 appearances
- Women's Tennis: 29 appearances
- Men's Outdoor Track and Field (now inactive): 21 appearances
- Women's Volleyball: 8 appearances
- Wrestling: 56 appearances

==== Other national team championships ====
National team titles that were not bestowed by the NCAA (4 are unofficial NCAA championships):

- Men's Swimming and Diving (4): 1924, 1929, 1930, 1933
- Men's basketball (1): 1931 (retroactive selection by Helms Athletic Foundation and Premo-Porretta Power Poll)

See also:

- List of Big Ten Conference National Championships
- List of NCAA schools with the most Division I national championships

== Notable alumni ==
=== Baseball ===
- Jerry Doggett, former broadcaster for the Los Angeles Dodgers
- Eddie Einhorn (J.D. 1960), vice chairman of the Chicago White Sox
- Luke Farrell, pitcher for the Texas Rangers
- Joe Girardi, former baseball player and New York Yankees manager, former manager of the Florida Marlins & Philadelphia Phillies and current TV analyst
- J. A. Happ, baseball player pitcher (Toronto Blue Jays)
- Mike Huff, former baseball player
- Eric Jokisch, pitcher for the Kiwoom Heroes of the KBO
- George Kontos, 2012 World Series champion with the San Francisco Giants
- Mike Koplove, Major League Baseball pitcher
- Kenesaw Mountain Landis (J.D. 1891), first Commissioner of Baseball
- Mark Loretta, baseball player (Milwaukee Brewers, Boston Red Sox, San Diego Padres, Los Angeles Dodgers)
- Gene Oliver, Baseball player
- Jerry Reinsdorf, owner of the Chicago White Sox and Chicago Bulls
- Mark Walter, founder and CEO of Guggenheim Partners, chairman of the Los Angeles Dodgers

=== Basketball ===
- Don Adams, former NBA and ABA player
- Nia Brodie, WNBA player
- Jim Burns, former NBA and ABA player
- Veronica Burton, WNBA player
- Drew Crawford (born 1990), basketball player in the Israeli Basketball Premier League
- Frank Ehmann, All-American basketball player
- Evan Eschmeyer, former basketball player (New Jersey Nets)
- Jake Fendley, former NBA player for the Fort Wayne Pistons
- Glen Grunwald (J.D. 1984), executive for the New York Knicks
- Willie Jones, former NBA player
- Vic Law, NBA player for Orlando Magic
- Billy McKinney, former NBA player, current director of scouting for the Milwaukee Bucks
- Daryl Morey (B.S. 1996), general manager of the Philadelphia 76ers
- Max Morris, All-American football and basketball player
- Dererk Pardon, professional basketball player
- Dan Peterson, basketball coach
- Kevin Rankin, basketball player and insurance underwriter
- Jerry Reinsdorf (J.D. 1960), owner of the Chicago Bulls and the Chicago White Sox
- Joe Ruklick, former NBA player for the Philadelphia Warriors, gave Wilt Chamberlain the final assist in his 100-point game
- Anucha Browne Sanders (B.S. 1985), former executive for New York Knicks
- John Shurna, basketball player with a long career in the spanish league
- Rick Sund, former general manager for the Atlanta Hawks

=== Figure skating ===
- Ronald Joseph, figure skater and long jumper
- Debi Thomas (M.D. 1997), figure skater

=== Football ===
- Mike Adamle, football player and sportscaster
- Dick Alban, football player
- Damien Anderson, American football player (St. Louis Rams)
- Frank Aschenbrenner, football player
- Darryl Ashmore, football player (Oakland Raiders, Rams, Redskins)
- Darnell Autry, football player (Chicago Bears and Philadelphia Eagles) and actor
- Frank Baker, football player
- Brett Basanez, football player (Chicago Bears)
- Cas Banaszek, football player
- D'Wayne Bates, football player (Chicago Bears and Minnesota Vikings)
- Sid Bennett, football player
- George Benson, football player
- Kevin Bentley, football player (Cleveland Browns and Seattle Seahawks)
- Ron Burton, football player, (Boston Patriots- now known as New England Patriots)
- Hank Bruder, football player
- Corbin Bryant, football player
- Ibraheim Campbell, football player
- Woody Campbell, football player
- Austin Carr, football player, (New Orleans Saints)
- Luis Castillo, football player, (San Diego Chargers)
- Bob Christian, football player, (Atlanta Falcons)
- Barry Cofield, football player, (Washington Redskins)
- Joe Collier, football head coach, Buffalo Bills
- Irv Cross, football player
- Andy Cvercko, football player
- Bill DeCorrevont, football player for four NFL teams (Washington Redskins, Detroit Lions, Chicago Cardinals, Chicago Bears)
- Garrett Dickerson, football player
- John L. "Paddy" Driscoll, football player
- Curtis Duncan, football player, Houston Oilers
- Tiny Engebretsen, football player
- Trai Essex, football player (Pittsburgh Steelers and Indianapolis Colts)
- Pat Fitzgerald, two-time All-American player, Northwestern head football coach 2006–2022.
- Barry Gardner, football player (Philadelphia Eagles)
- Joe Gaziano, football player
- Brian Gowins, American football player (Chicago Bears)
- Otto Graham, football player
- Nate Hall, football player
- Napoleon Harris, football player, Oakland Raiders and Minnesota Vikings
- Montre Hartage, football player
- Noah Herron, football player, Green Bay Packers
- Chris Hinton, seven-time Pro Bowl player, Indianapolis Colts, Atlanta Falcons and Minnesota Vikings
- Godwin Igwebuike, football player, Tampa Bay Buccaneers, San Francisco 49ers and Philadelphia Eagles
- Justin Jackson, football player, Los Angeles Chargers
- Paul Janus, football player
- Luke Johnsos, football player
- Mike Kafka, football player, Philadelphia Eagles
- Jim Keane, football player
- Doc Kelley, football player
- John Kidd, NFL punter for five teams (Buffalo Bills, San Diego Chargers, Miami Dolphins, Detroit Lions and New York Jets)
- Elbert Kimbrough, football player
- Bob Koehler, football player
- Tyler Lancaster, football player
- Dean Lowry, football player
- Sherrick McManis, football player, Chicago Bears
- Alex Moyer, football player
- Hunter Niswander, NFL punter
- Matt O'Dwyer, football player (New York Jets, Cincinnati Bengals)
- Ifeadi Odenigbo, football player
- Ted Phillips, Chicago Bears president and CEO
- Kyle Prater, NFL wide receiver
- Nick Roach, football player, Chicago Bears
- Jeff Roehl, American football player
- Jack Rudnay, football player
- Pete Shaw, football player
- Trevor Siemian, football player, Denver Broncos and Minnesota Vikings
- Rashawn Slater, football player, Los Angeles Chargers
- Zach Strief, football player
- Tyrell Sutton, football player, Carolina Panthers
- Clayton Thorson, football player, Dallas Cowboys
- Steve Tasker, football player (Houston Oilers and Buffalo Bills) and sports announcer
- Rob Taylor, football player and head coach
- Danny Vitale, football player
- Anthony Walker Jr., football player
- Ray Wietecha, football player
- George Wilson, football player and head coach
- Fred Williamson, football player
- Eric Wilson, football player
- Corey Wootton, football player, Chicago Bears
- Jason Wright, running back and business executive

=== Golf ===
- Jim Benepe, golfer
- Luke Donald, golfer
- Matt Fitzpatrick, golfer
- David Lipsky, golfer
- David Merkow, golfer
- Jane Weiller (1912–1989), golfer

=== Hockey ===
- Rocky Wirtz, owner of the Chicago Blackhawks

=== Horse racing ===
- David Israel (B.S.J. 1973), former chair of the California Horse Racing Board, former president of the Los Angeles Memorial Coliseum Commission

=== Autoracing ===
- Paul Dana, former race car driver in the Indy Racing League

=== Soccer ===
- Tyler Miller, professional soccer player
- Brad North, soccer player (D.C. United)

=== Swimming ===
- Sybil Bauer, swimmer, gold medalist at the 1924 Summer Olympics in the 100 m backstroke
- Matt Grevers, winner of four gold and two silver Olympic medals in multiple events in 2008 and 2012
- Bob Skelton, 1924 Olympic gold medalist in 200-meter breaststroke
- Jordan Wilimovsky, 2015 World Champion in the 10 km open water race

=== Tennis ===
- Katrina Adams, tennis player, former president of the USTA
- Audra Cohen, 2007 NCAA women's singles champion (never graduated)
- Grant Golden (1929–2018), tennis player
- Clark Graebner, tennis player
- Seymour Greenberg (1920–2006), tennis player
- Judy Ade Levering, first woman President of the United States Tennis Association (USTA 1999–2000)
- Todd Martin, tennis player
- Marty Riessen, tennis player

=== Track and field ===
- Jim Golliday, track
- Betty Robinson, Track and Field, gold medalist in the 1928 Summer Olympics and the 1936 Summer Olympics
- Annette Rogers, sprinter

=== Professional softball ===
- Tammy Williams, shortstop, won world championship with Team USA in 2010 and National Pro Fastpitch championship with Chicago Bandits in 2011

=== Wrestling ===
- Jake Herbert, Olympian, USA amateur wrestler
