= June Beebe =

American golfer (1913–2003)

Personal information
- Full name: June Beebe Atwood
- Nationality: United States
- Born: March 27, 1913 Chicago, Illinois, U.S.
- Died: November 10, 2003 (aged 90)
- Spouse: Phillip Atwood
- Children: Judy, Jill, James

Career
- Sport: Golf
- Former tour: LPGA Tour
- Professional wins: 2

Number of wins by tour
- LPGA Tour: 2

Best results in LPGA major championships (wins: 2)
- Western Open: Won: 1931, 1933

June Beebe Atwood (March 27, 1913 – November 10, 2003) was an American golfer.

== Career ==
In 1913, she was born in Chicago, Illinois. She won the Women's Western Open 1931 and 1933, and finished second in 1930 and to Jane Weiller 1932.

She competed in college for the Northwestern Wildcats. She also competed under her married name, Mrs. Phillip Atwood. She also won the Chicago Women's District Golf Association's Championship twice, in 1933 and 1935.

== Tournament wins ==
- 1931 Women's Western Open
- 1933 Chicago Women's District Golf Association's Championship, Women's Western Open
- 1935 Chicago Women's District Golf Association's Championship

== Major championships ==
=== Wins (2) ===
Year	Championship	Winning score	Runner-up
1931	Women's Western Open	3 & 2	(United States) Mrs. Melvin Jones (a)
1933	Women's Western Open	3 & 2	(United States) Jane Weiller (a)
