= 1931 Women's Western Open =

Golf tournament

Coordinates: 41°37′52″N 87°44′46″W

The 1931 Women's Western Open was a golf tournament held at Midlothian Country Club in Midlothian, Illinois outside Chicago. It was the second edition of the Women's Western Open. June Beebe won the championship in match play competition by defeating Rose Jones in the final match, 3 and 2.
