= BadJocks.com =

Website covering sports-related misconduct

- Website type: Sports
- Owner: Bob Reno
- Creator: Bob Reno
- Website: http://badjocks.com/
- Commercial: Yes
- Registration: No

BadJocks.com was a website that covered sports-related misconduct and crime at all levels, from professional to children's, by not only the athletes themselves but coaches and spectators as well. Starting in 2000, creator and content provider Bob Reno wrote daily items on not only well-covered events such as the rape charges against three Duke lacrosse players and the Minnesota Vikings "love boat" scandal but less-reported local events as well, with video clips sometimes included. While the site's news and audience are primarily U.S.-based, foreign news, particularly soccer-related, has been covered as well. He billed the site as "Where COPS Meets SportsCenter". In 2008 Time chose the site as one of 25 in its first annual blog index, and in 2009 Sports Illustrated named the site one of the decade's five most influential blogs.

Generally, the site's tone was light-hearted, featuring Reno's acerbic commentary on the various occurrences culled from other media. Reno keeps an annual tally of several types of stories that occur on frequent basis each year, with three ("drunken outbursts", "naughty cheerleaders" and "streakers and naked people" at the moment) typifying much of the content. However, the fourth, high school coach sex scandals, have been treated more and more seriously by Reno as many involve relations between adults and students, and he was taken aback when these numbers regularly approached 200 each year, so much that he stopped keeping count in 2007. He has sometimes posted commentary and analysis of the phenomenon, with input from readers.

== College hazing pictures ==
In 2005, Reno began searching on Webshots using the search strings "initiation" or, less frequently, "hazing". These eventually yielded albums of members of various colleges' sports teams putting freshman members through hazing rituals. Many of these involved women's teams, and Reno posted the pictures on his website in case the originals were taken down. Most featured the players wearing lingerie outside their clothes and with various things, some obscene, written on their bodies with marker as they performed some humiliating task. The Catholic University of America was seriously embarrassed by photos showing their school's women's lacrosse team cavorting with a thong-clad male stripper, and later suspended the entire team for three games.

Since some showed alcohol consumption by students who were underage, in violation of liquor laws and school policies, investigations were started by the respective colleges. Most stopped short of finding any serious wrongdoing and gave the students involved the benefit of the doubt.

However, in May 2006 a reader of the site found pictures of the Northwestern University women's soccer team putting its freshmen through hazing more serious than other colleges, and Reno posted them. The young women were shown drinking tequila and other hard liquor and going through similar rituals as their counterparts elsewhere, with penises drawn on them in marker. In some shots, though, they were blindfolded with their hands tied behind their backs with duct tape and were apparently performing simulated sex acts and giving fully clothed lap dances to players on the men's soccer team.

Other sites started making similar searches and posting the results. Reno merely linked to those, but the media often mistakenly credited BadJocks anyway.

The publication of the photos led to the coach's resignation. Northwestern suspended the team. Reno and the site earned national attention. Many commentators said they were profoundly shocked to see women engaging in such degrading conduct.

BadJocks became so closely associated with the hazing pictures and the ensuing scandals that, in April 2007, the University of Minnesota at Duluth's athletic director specifically referred to it when explaining a new request that student-athletes not use Facebook or MySpace. Reno responded that he did not troll either site and usually found the pictures, if he had been the one to do so, on Webshots.
