= Jane Weiller =

American golfer

Personal information
- Full name: Jane Weiller Selz
- Nationality: United States
- Born: April 25, 1912 Chicago, Illinois, U.S.
- Died: June 7, 1989 (aged 77) Ventura County, California, U.S.

Career
- Sport: Golf
- College: Northwestern University
- Status: Amateur

Best results in LPGA major championships (wins: 1)
- Western Open: Won: 1932
- U.S. Women's Open: DNP

Jane Weiller (April 25, 1912 – June 7, 1989) was an American golfer. She was born and lived in Chicago, Illinois, and was Jewish. She later married in 1935 and competed under her married name, Mrs. Lawrence Selz.

== Career ==
In 1932, at 20 years of age and playing for Northmoor Country Club, she won the Women's Western Open at the Ozaukee Country Club in Mequon, Wisconsin, which was retrospectively recognized as a major championship by the LPGA, defeating June Beebe in the final. She competed in college for the Northwestern Wildcats.

Weiller also won the Chicago Women's District Golf Association's Championship three times: in 1931, 1944, and 1961. In 1960, she won the women's national amateur championship of Mexico.

== Tournament wins ==
- 1931 Chicago Women's District Golf Association's Championship
- 1932 Women's Western Open
- 1944 Chicago Women's District Golf Association's Championship
- 1960 Women's Mexican Amateur
- 1961 Chicago Women's District Golf Association's Championship

== Major championships ==
=== Wins (1) ===
Year	Championship	Winning score	Runner-up
1932	Women's Western Open	5 and 4	(United States) June Beebe (a)
